= The Eruption of Vesuvius =

Paintings by Johan Christian Dahl

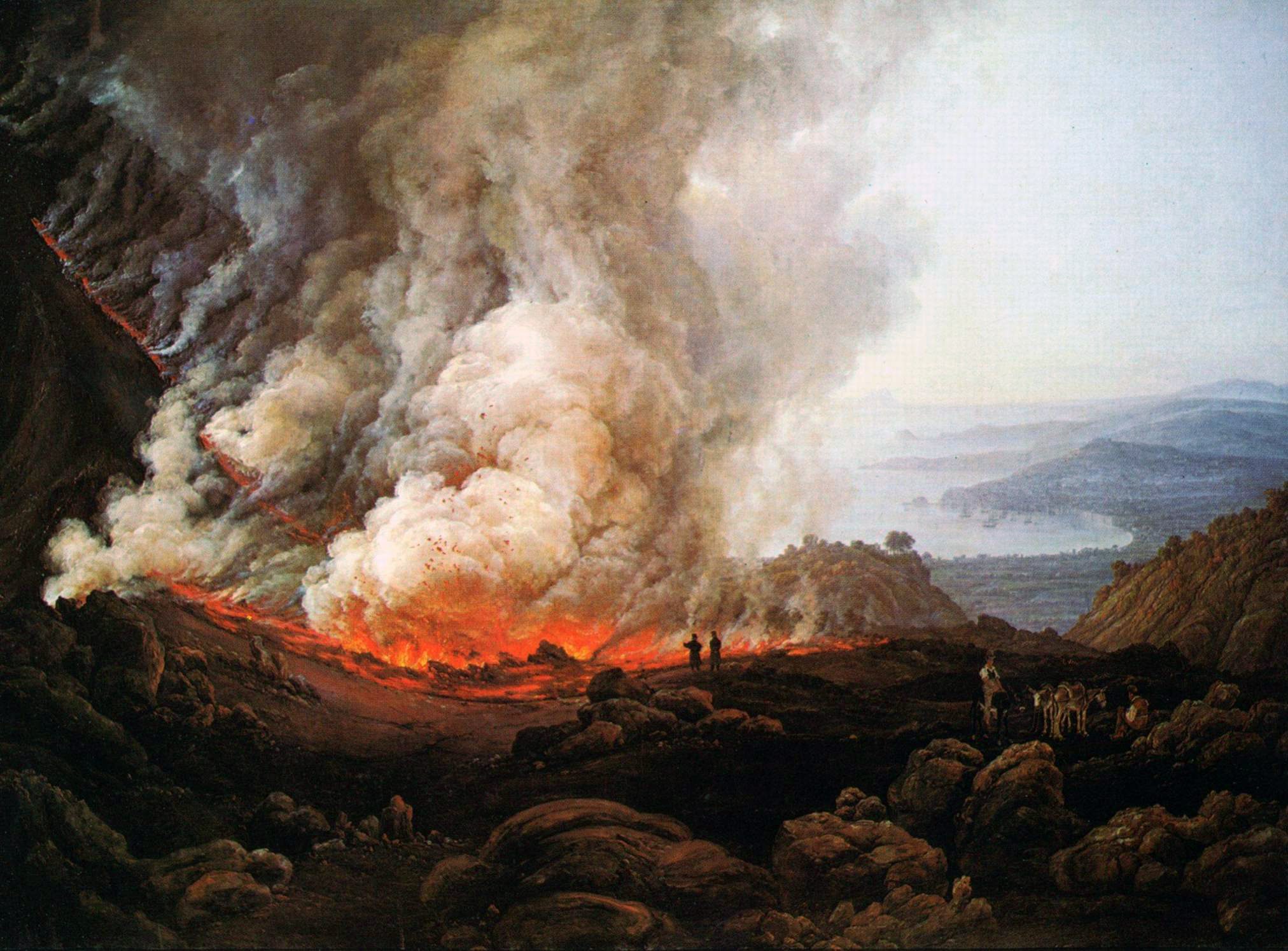
The Eruption of Vesuvius (1821) by Johan Christian Dahl

The Eruption of Vesuvius is the name of several paintings by the Norwegian artist Johan Christian Dahl, executed from 1820 to 1826. He travelled to Italy in 1820, spending a short time in Rome before moving on to Naples, arriving in time for the eruption of Mount Vesuvius in December that year. He was one of the first to climb the mountain. There are at least seven versions of the painting, three are exhibited in the Danish National Gallery in Copenhagen, in the Kode Museum in Bergen, and the final one in Städel Museum in Frankfurt.

Dahl also painted several similar paintings of Vesuvius and the Bay of Naples, such as View of Vesuvius from Villa Quisisana (1820) at the Nationalmuseum in Stockholm and The Bay of Naples in the moonlight and Vesuvius in the eruption (1821) at the Thorvaldsen Museum in Copenhagen. Magnificent natural scenes appealed to the art collectors of the time, which also explains Dahl's large production of paintings near Vesuvius. Dahl painted almost exclusively landscapes and, together with his friend Caspar David Friedrich, was a leading figure in Romantic painting.
