= Pietro della Vigna =

Italian jurist and diplomat (1190–1249)

Pietro della Vigna (also Pier delle Vigne, Petrus de Vineas or de Vineis; Capua, c. 1190 – San Miniato, 1249) was an Italian jurist and diplomat, who acted as chancellor and secretary (logothete) to Emperor Frederick II. Accused of lèse-majesté, he was imprisoned and blinded, committing suicide soon after. He appears as a character in the Inferno of the Divine Comedy by Dante Alighieri.

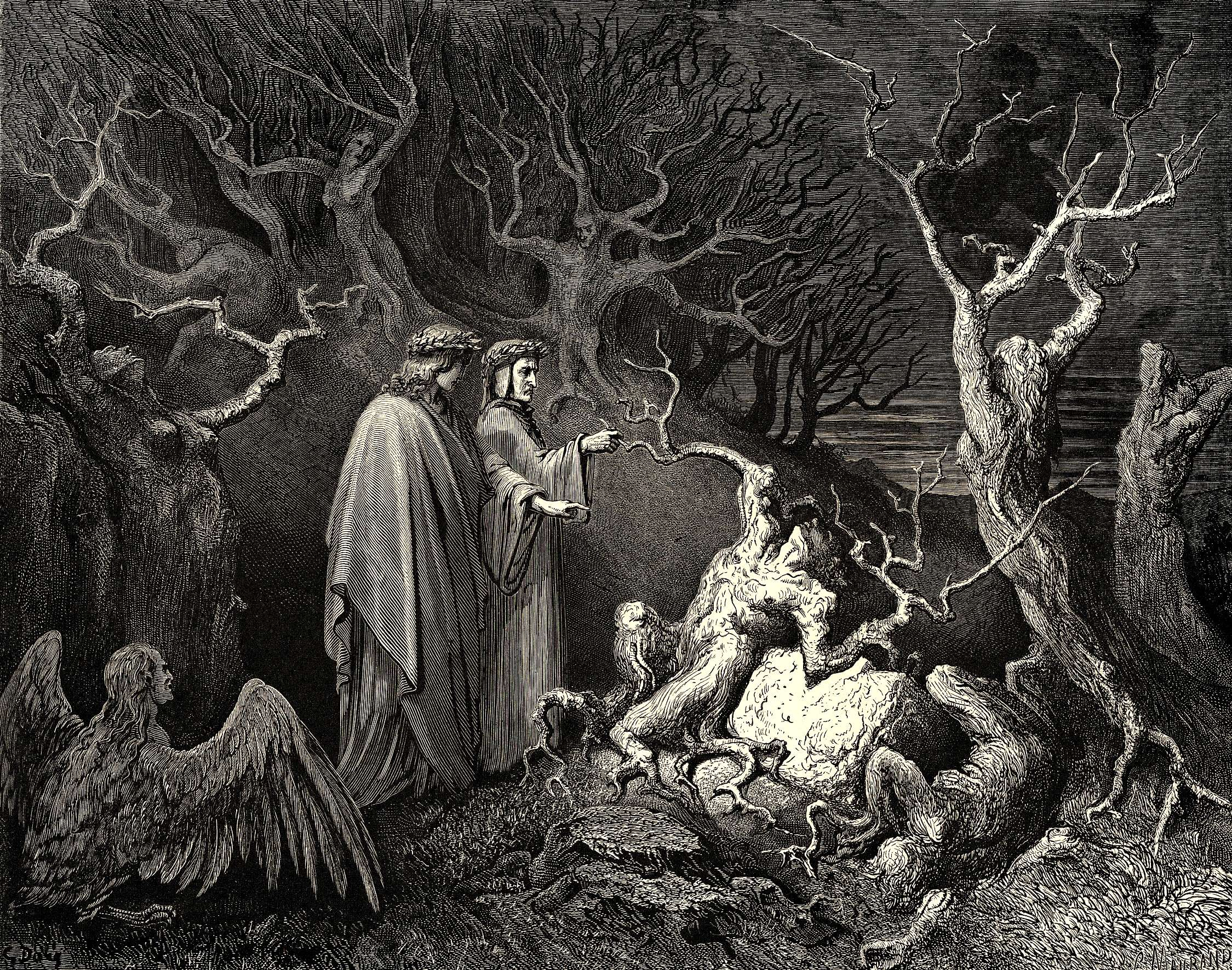
Dante and Virgilius meet Pietro della Vigna in the forest of Self-Murderers, in Canto XIII of Hell, c. 1866

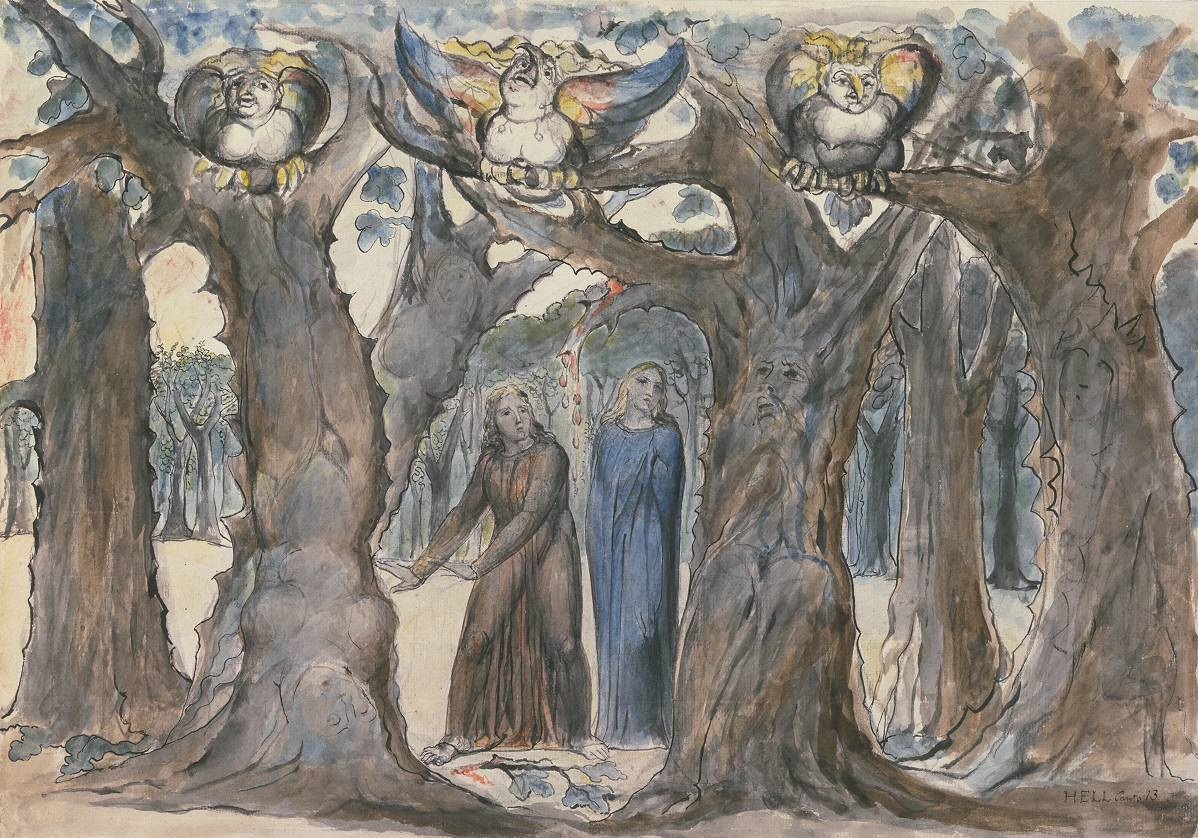
The Wood of the Self-Murderers: The Harpies and the Suicides, c. 1824–7. William Blake, Tate. 372 × 527mm. Shown is a scene from the Divine Comedy: Dante and Virgil discover Pietro's body encased in a tree.

== Life and work ==
Pietro della Vigna was born in 1190 in Capua under humble circumstances. He went on to study law at Bologna. Through his classical education, his ability to speak Latin and his poetic gifts, he then gained the favour of Emperor Frederick II, who made him his secretary, and afterwards judex magnae curiae, councillor, governor of Apulia, prothonotary and chancellor. The emperor sent him to Rome in 1232 and 1237 to negotiate with the pope; to Padua in 1239 to induce the citizens to accept imperial protection; and to England in 1234–1235 to arrange a marriage between Frederick II and Isabella of England, the sister of King Henry III of England.

Della Vigna proved a skillful and trustworthy diplomat, and he persistently defended the emperor against his traducers and against the pope's menaces. But at the First Council of Lyon (1245), which had been summoned by Pope Innocent IV, della Vigna entrusted the defense of his master to the celebrated jurist Taddeo da Suessa, who failed to prevent his condemnation.

Della Vigna was a distinguished man of culture. He encouraged science and the fine arts, and contributed much to the welfare of Italy by his legislative reforms. He was also the author of some vernacular poetry, of which two canzoni and a sonnet are still extant.

His letters, mostly written in the name of the emperor and published by Iselin (Epistolarum libri vi, 2 v., Basel, 1740), contain much valuable information on the history and culture of the 13th century. A collection of the laws of Sicily, a Tractatus de potestate imperiali, and another treatise, On Consolation, in the style of Boethius, are also attributed to him.

The Guelphic tradition accuses della Vigna, as well as the emperor and his court, of heresy. It was even stated, probably without any foundation, that they were the authors of the famous work De Tribus Impostoribus, wherein Moses, Jesus and Muhammad are criticised and their teachings are rejected.

== Imprisonment and supposed suicide ==
Della Vigna was arrested in Cremona in March 1249, as a traitor (proditor). The reasons for the arrest have never been clarified; a conspiracy or accusation of corruption has been suggested. He was blinded by Frederick II in Pontremoli in the Piazzetta of San Geminiano. The exact circumstances of della Vigna's death, which occurred shortly after his downfall, are unknown; some sources claim that he may have been tortured to death or died as a result of being blinded, while others insist that he committed suicide in a prison tower of San Miniato.

== In the Divine Comedy ==
As a suicide, he appears as one of the damned in the Woods of Suicide in Dante's Inferno, Circle VII, Ring II, Canto XIII: Violent against the self: suicides and profligates. Della Vigna reveals his identity to the travelers Dante and Virgil: "I am himself that held both keys of Frederick's heart / to lock and unlock and well I knew / to turn them with so exquisite an art."

Dante's portrayal of della Vigna emphasises his skill as a rhetorician. His syntax is complex and tangled, like the thornbushes. At one point, Dante echoes it: "I think he thought that I was thinking", according to John Ciardi's translation. In placing him among the suicides rather than the traitors, Dante affirms that della Vigna was falsely or wrongly accused, in other words, framed.

In the 19th century, William Blake illustrated the Divine Comedy and depicted della Vigna in The Wood of the Self-Murderers: The Harpies and the Suicides.
