= Romantic art =

Art movement

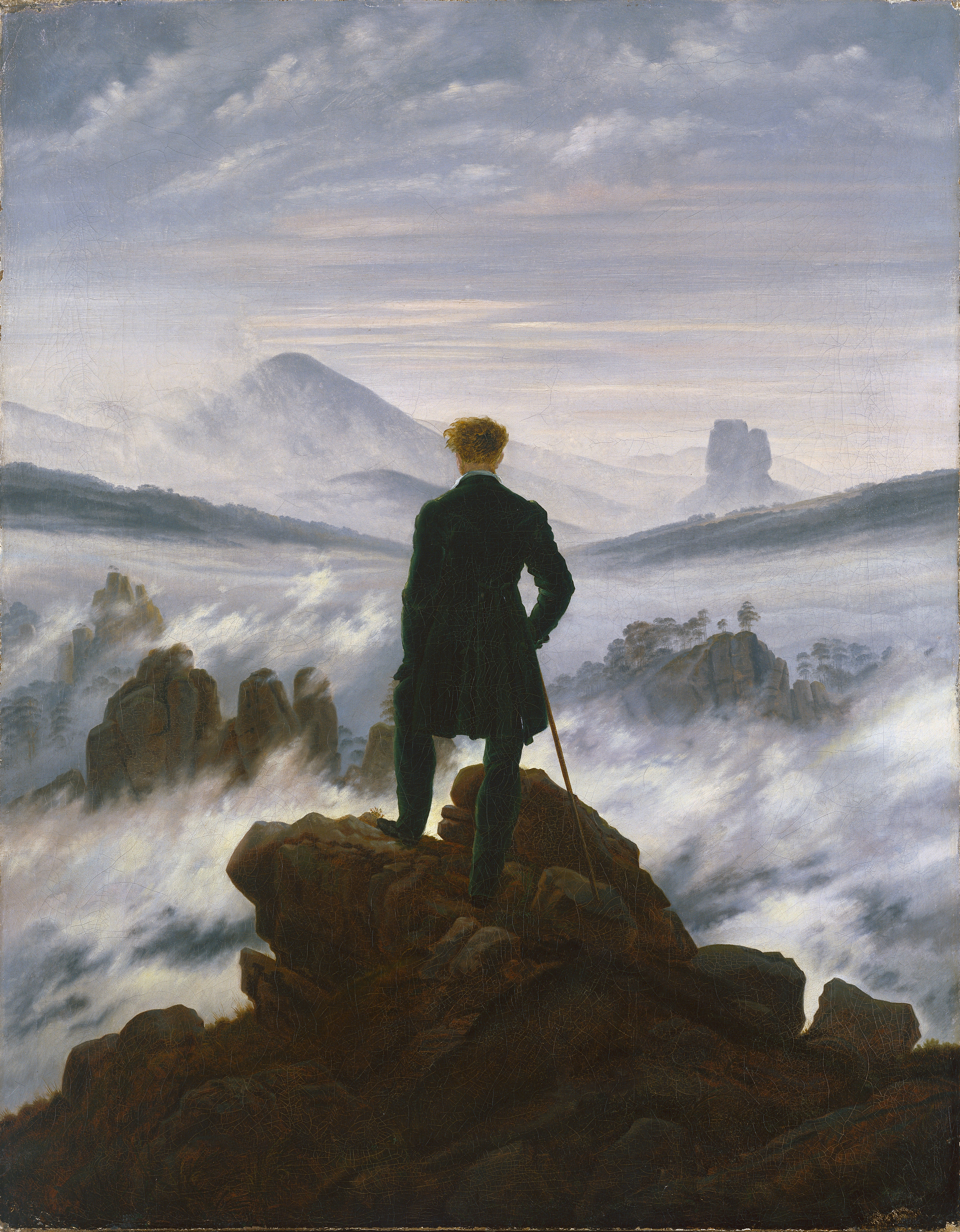
Caspar David Friedrich, Wanderer above the Sea of Fog, 1818

Romantic art was an art movement of the 18th and 19th centuries.

== Themes ==
Apocalyptic art
A trend in Romantic art involved large apocalyptic history paintings that often combined extreme natural events, or divine wrath, with human disaster, attempting to outdo The Raft of the Medusa. The leading English artist in the style was John Martin, whose tiny figures were dwarfed by enormous earthquakes and storms, and worked his way through the biblical disasters, and those to come in the final days. Other works such as Delacroix's Death of Sardanapalus included larger figures, and these often drew heavily on earlier artists, especially Poussin and Rubens, with extra emotionalism and special effects.

== Beginnings ==
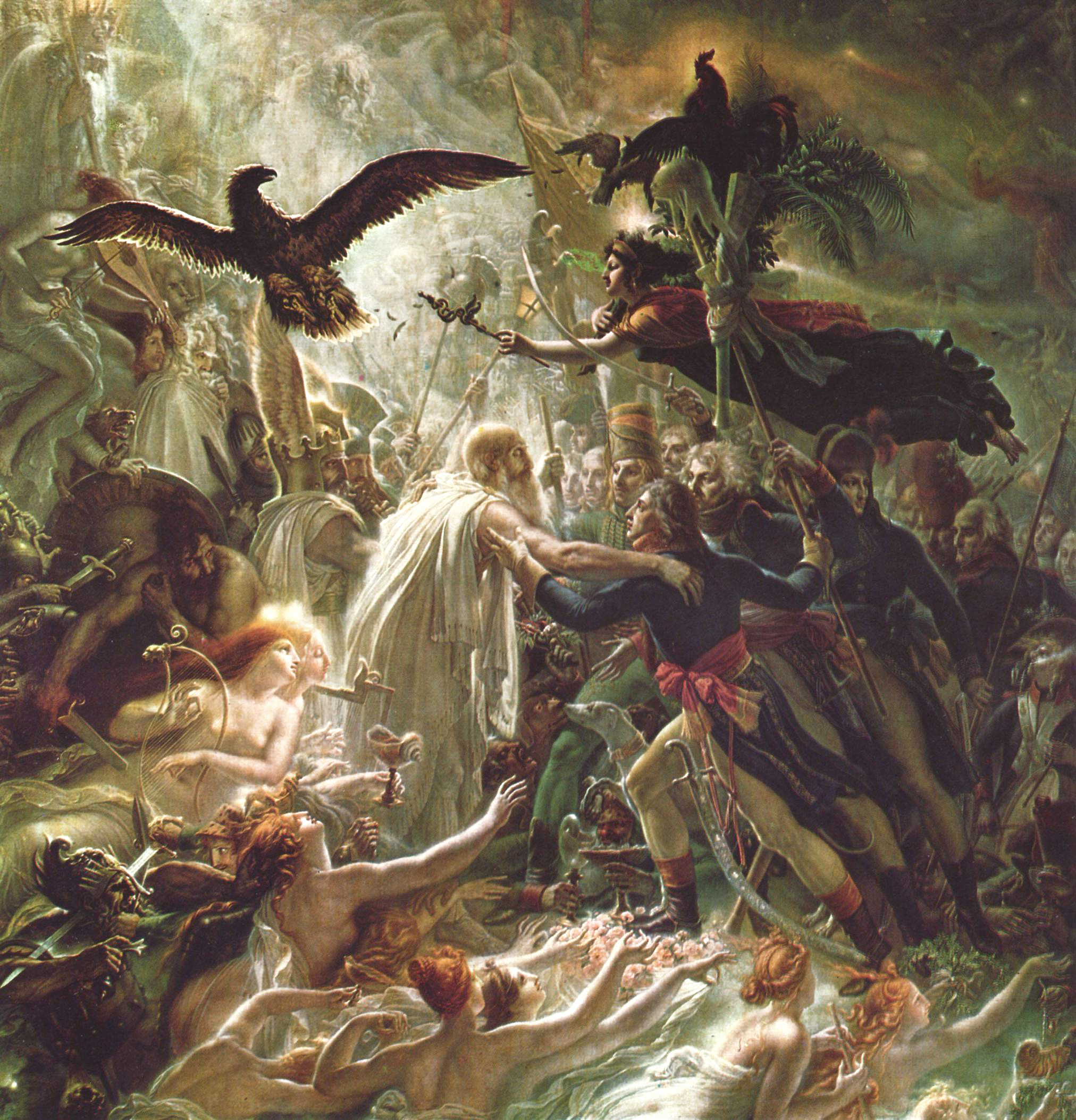
Anne-Louis Girodet de Roussy-Trioson, Ossian receiving the Ghosts of the French Heroes (1800–02), Musée national de Malmaison et Bois-Préau, Château de Malmaison

In the visual arts, Romanticism first showed itself in landscape painting, where from as early as the 1760s British artists began to turn to wilder landscapes and storms, and Gothic architecture, even if they had to make do with Wales as a setting. Caspar David Friedrich and J. M. W. Turner were born less than a year apart in 1774 and 1775 respectively and were to take German and English landscape painting to their extremes of Romanticism, but both their artistic sensibilities were formed when forms of Romanticism was already strongly present in art. John Constable, born in 1776, stayed closer to the English landscape tradition, but in his largest "six-footers" insisted on the heroic status of a patch of the working countryside where he had grown up—challenging the traditional hierarchy of genres, which relegated landscape painting to a low status. Turner also painted very large landscapes, and above all, seascapes. Some of these large paintings had contemporary settings and staffage, but others had small figures that turned the work into history painting in the manner of Claude Lorrain, like Salvator Rosa, a late Baroque artist whose landscapes had elements that Romantic painters repeatedly turned to. Friedrich often used single figures, or features like crosses, set alone amidst a huge landscape, "making them images of the transitoriness of human life and the premonition of death".

Other groups of artists expressed feelings that verged on the mystical, many largely abandoning classical drawing and proportions. These included William Blake and Samuel Palmer and the other members of the Ancients in England, and in Germany Philipp Otto Runge. Like Friedrich, none of these artists had significant influence after their deaths for the rest of the 19th century, and were 20th-century rediscoveries from obscurity, though Blake was always known as a poet, and Norway's leading painter Johan Christian Dahl was heavily influenced by Friedrich. The Rome-based Nazarene movement of German artists, active from 1810, took a very different path, concentrating on medievalizing history paintings with religious and nationalist themes.

== By country ==
=== France ===
The arrival of Romanticism in French art was delayed by the strong hold of Neoclassicism on the academies, but from the Napoleonic period it became increasingly popular, initially in the form of history paintings propagandising for the new regime, of which Girodet's Ossian receiving the Ghosts of the French Heroes, for Napoleon's Château de Malmaison, was one of the earliest. Girodet's old teacher David was puzzled and disappointed by his pupil's direction, saying: "Either Girodet is mad or I no longer know anything of the art of painting". A new generation of the French school, developed personal Romantic styles, though still concentrating on history painting with a political message. Théodore Géricault (1791–1824) had his first success with The Charging Chasseur, a heroic military figure derived from Rubens, at the Paris Salon of 1812 in the years of the Empire, but his next major completed work, The Raft of the Medusa of 1818–19, remains the greatest achievement of the Romantic history painting, which in its day had a powerful anti-government message.

Eugène Delacroix (1798–1863) made his first Salon hits with The Barque of Dante (1822), The Massacre at Chios (1824) and Death of Sardanapalus (1827). The second was a scene from the Greek War of Independence, completed the year Byron died there, and the last was a scene from one of Byron's plays. With Shakespeare, Byron was to provide the subject matter for many other works of Delacroix, who also spent long periods in North Africa, painting colourful scenes of mounted Arab warriors. His Liberty Leading the People (1830) remains, with the Medusa, one of the best-known works of French Romantic painting. Both reflected current events, and increasingly "history painting", literally "story painting", a phrase dating back to the Italian Renaissance meaning the painting of subjects with groups of figures, long considered the highest and most difficult form of art, did indeed become the painting of historical scenes, rather than those from religion or mythology.

Troubadour style
In France, historical painting on idealized medieval and Renaissance themes is known as the style Troubadour, a term with no equivalent for other countries, though the same trends occurred there. Delacroix, Ingres and Richard Parkes Bonington all worked in this style, as did lesser specialists such as Pierre-Henri Révoil (1776–1842) and Fleury-François Richard (1777–1852). Their pictures are often small, and feature intimate private and anecdotal moments, as well as those of high drama. The lives of great artists such as Raphael were commemorated on equal terms with those of rulers, and fictional characters were also depicted. Fleury-Richard's Valentine of Milan weeping for the death of her husband, shown in the Paris Salon of 1802, marked the arrival of the style, which lasted until the mid-century, before being subsumed into the increasingly academic history painting of artists like Paul Delaroche.

=== Spain ===
Francisco Goya was called "the last great painter in whose art thought and observation were balanced and combined to form a faultless unity". But the extent to which he was a Romantic is a complex question. In Spain, there was still a struggle to introduce the values of the Enlightenment, in which Goya saw himself as a participant. The demonic and anti-rational monsters thrown up by his imagination are only superficially similar to those of the Gothic fantasies of northern Europe, and in many ways he remained wedded to the classicism and realism of his training, as well as looking forward to the Realism of the later 19th century. But he, more than any other artist of the period, exemplified the Romantic values of the expression of the artist's feelings and his personal imaginative world. He also shared with many of the Romantic painters a more free handling of paint, emphasized in the new prominence of the brushstroke and impasto, which tended to be repressed in neoclassicism under a self-effacing finish.

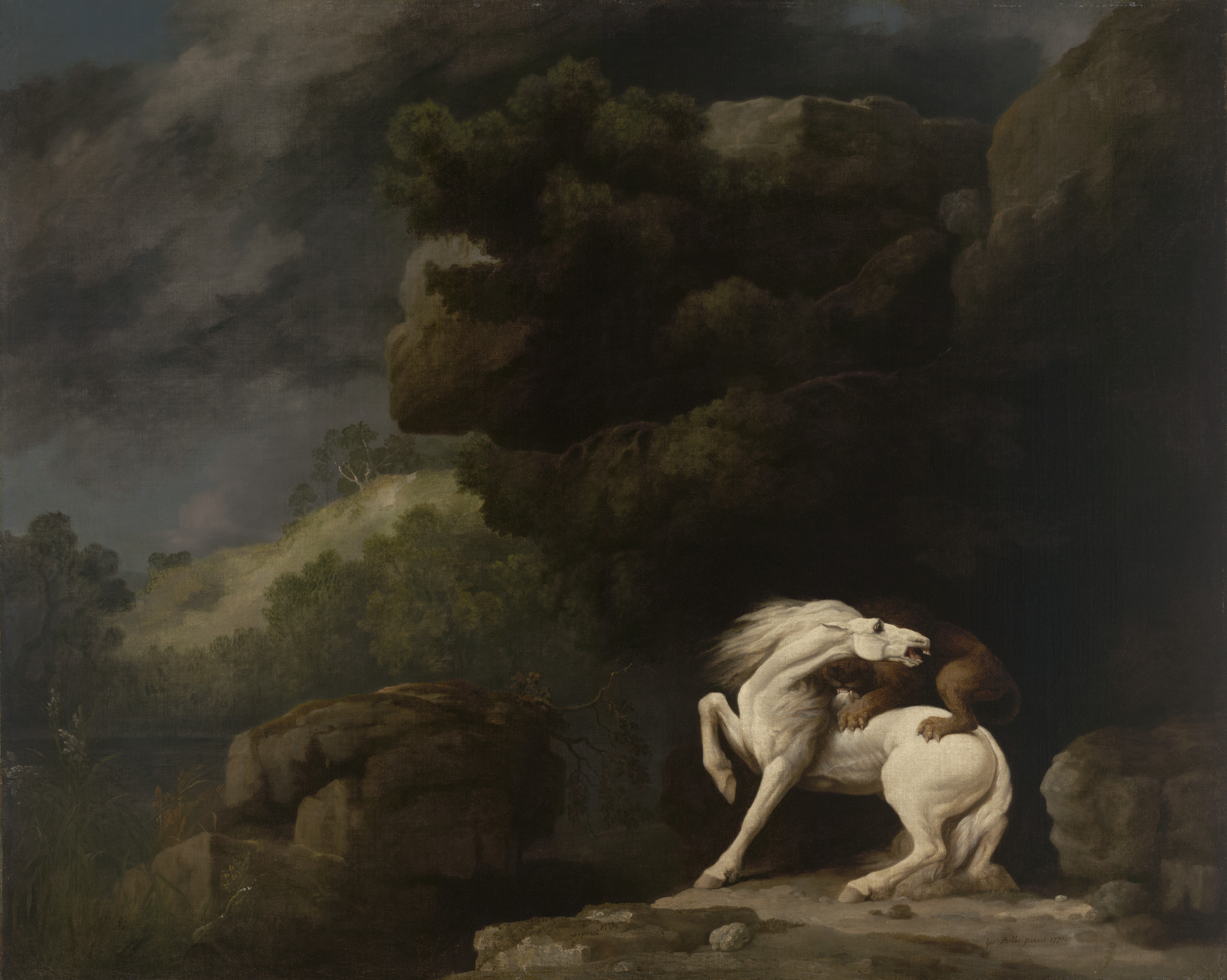
George Stubbs, A Lion Attacking a Horse (1770), oil on canvas, 38 in. x 49 1/2in., Yale Center for British Art

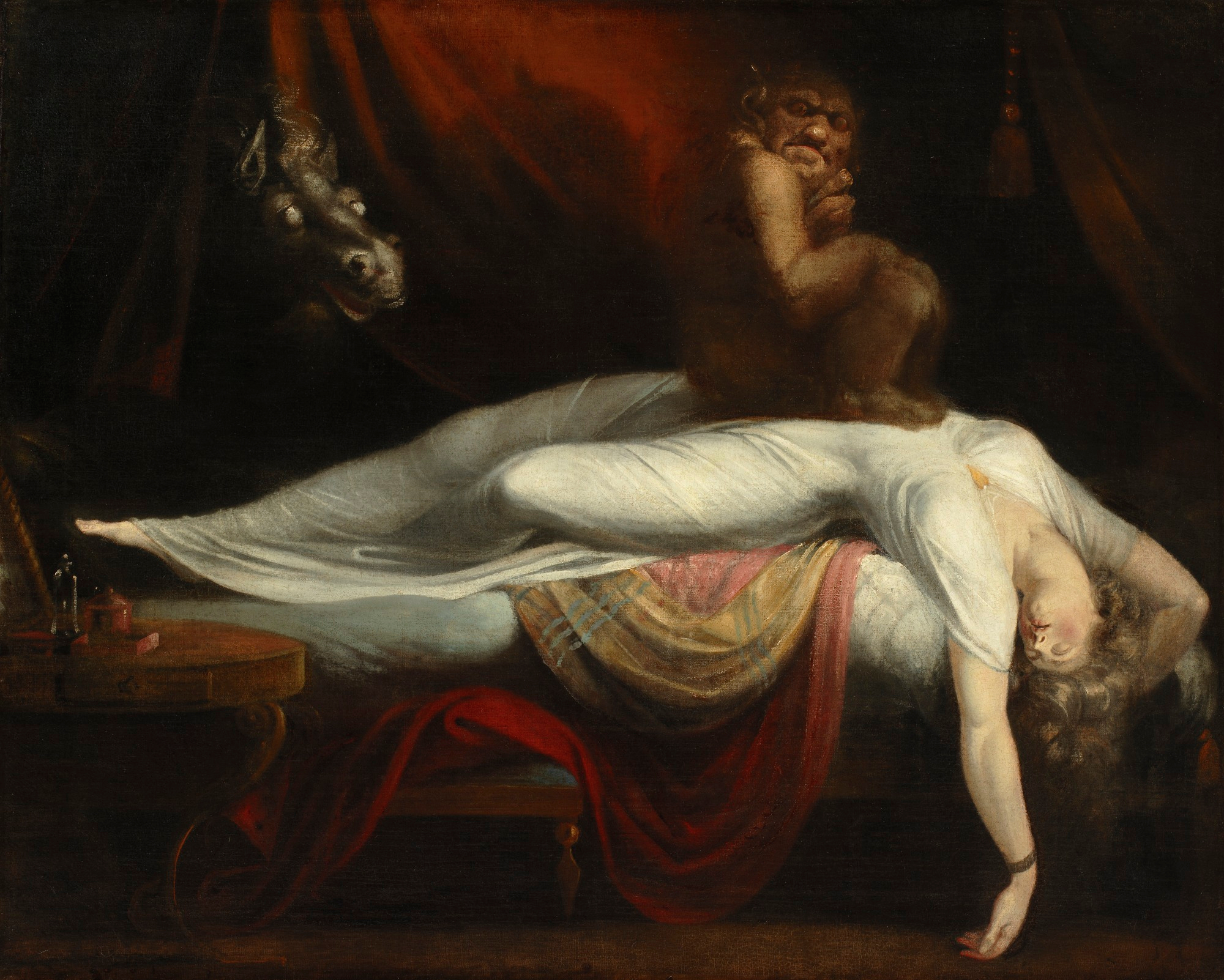
John Henry Fuseli, The Nightmare (1781), oil on canvas, 101.6 cm × 127 cm., Detroit Institute of Arts

Francisco Goya, The Third of May 1808, 1814

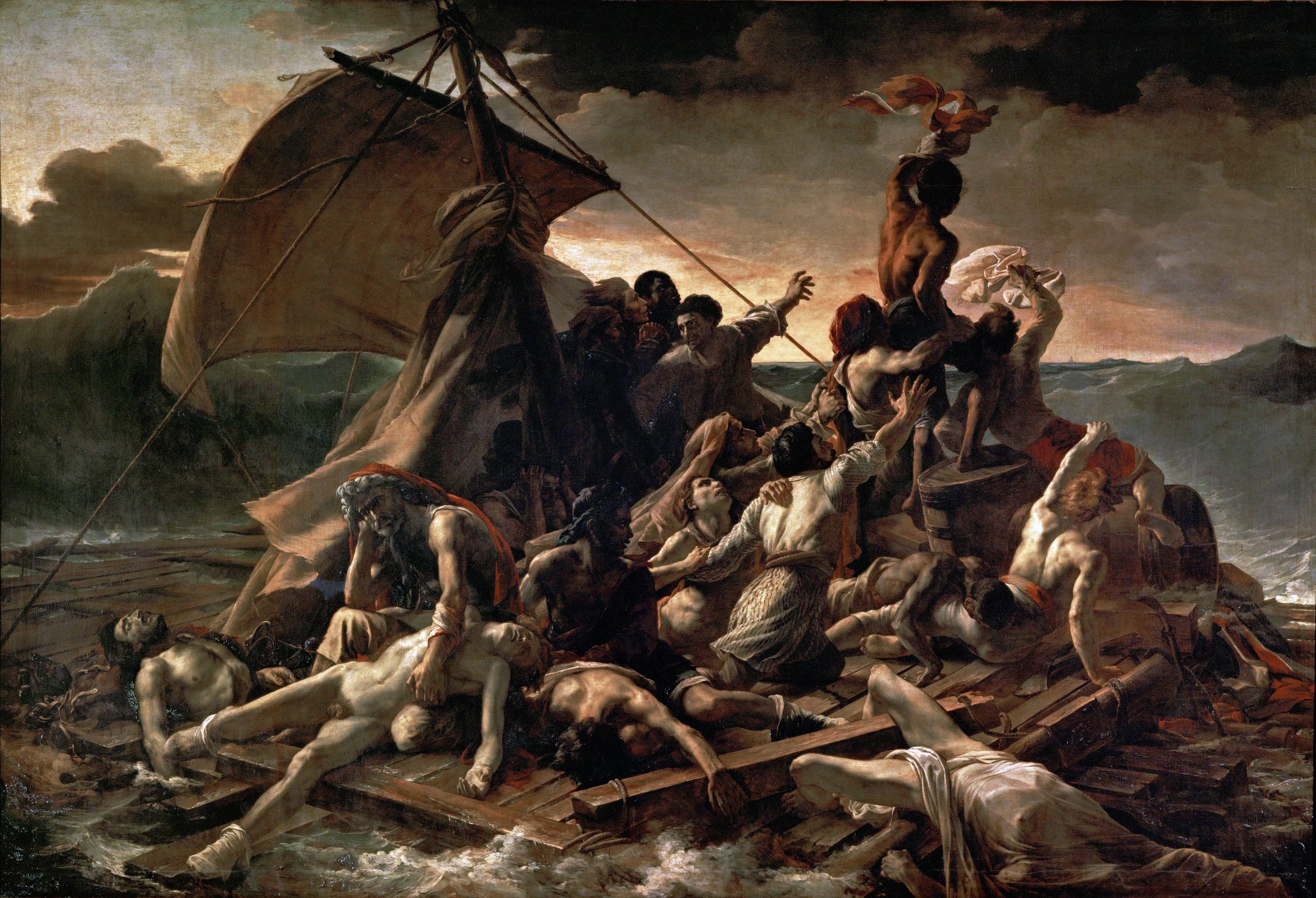
Théodore Géricault, The Raft of the Medusa, 1819

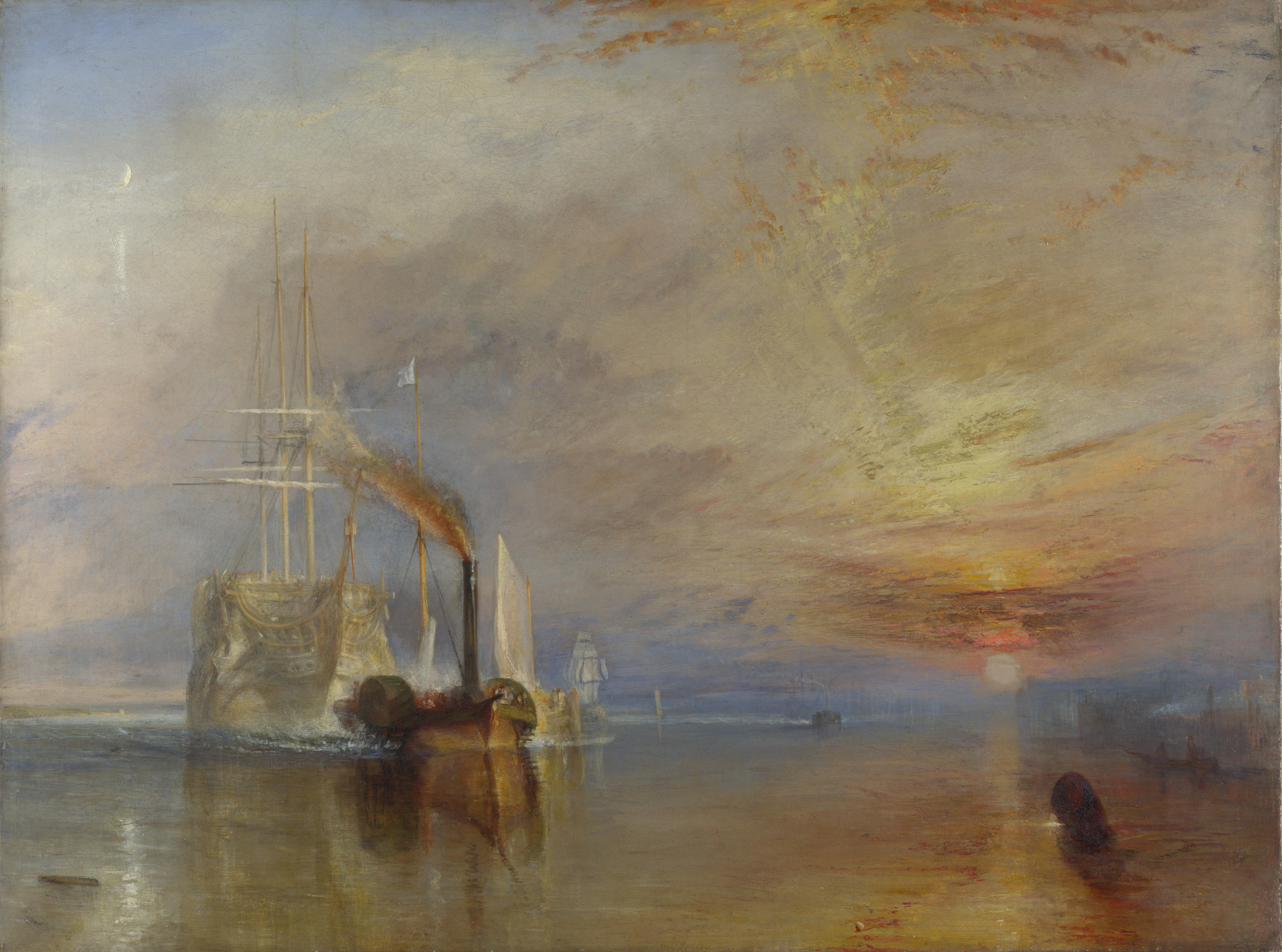
J. M. W. Turner, The Fighting Téméraire tugged to her last Berth to be broken up, 1839

=== United States ===
Literary Romanticism had its counterpart in the American visual arts, most especially in the exaltation of an untamed American landscape found in the paintings of the Hudson River School. Painters like Thomas Cole, Albert Bierstadt and Frederic Edwin Church and others often expressed Romantic themes in their paintings. They sometimes depicted ancient ruins of the old world, such as in Fredric Edwin Church's piece Sunrise in Syria. These works reflected the Gothic feelings of death and decay. They also show the Romantic ideal that Nature is powerful and will eventually overcome the transient creations of men. More often, they worked to distinguish themselves from their European counterparts by depicting uniquely American scenes and landscapes. This idea of an American identity in the art world is reflected in W. C. Bryant's poem To Cole, the Painter, Departing for Europe, where Bryant encourages Cole to remember the powerful scenes that can only be found in America.

Some American paintings (such as Albert Bierstadt's The Rocky Mountains, Lander's Peak) promote the literary idea of the "noble savage" by portraying idealized Native Americans living in harmony with the natural world. Thomas Cole's paintings tend towards allegory, explicit in The Voyage of Life series painted in the early 1840s, showing the stages of life set amidst an awesome and immense nature.

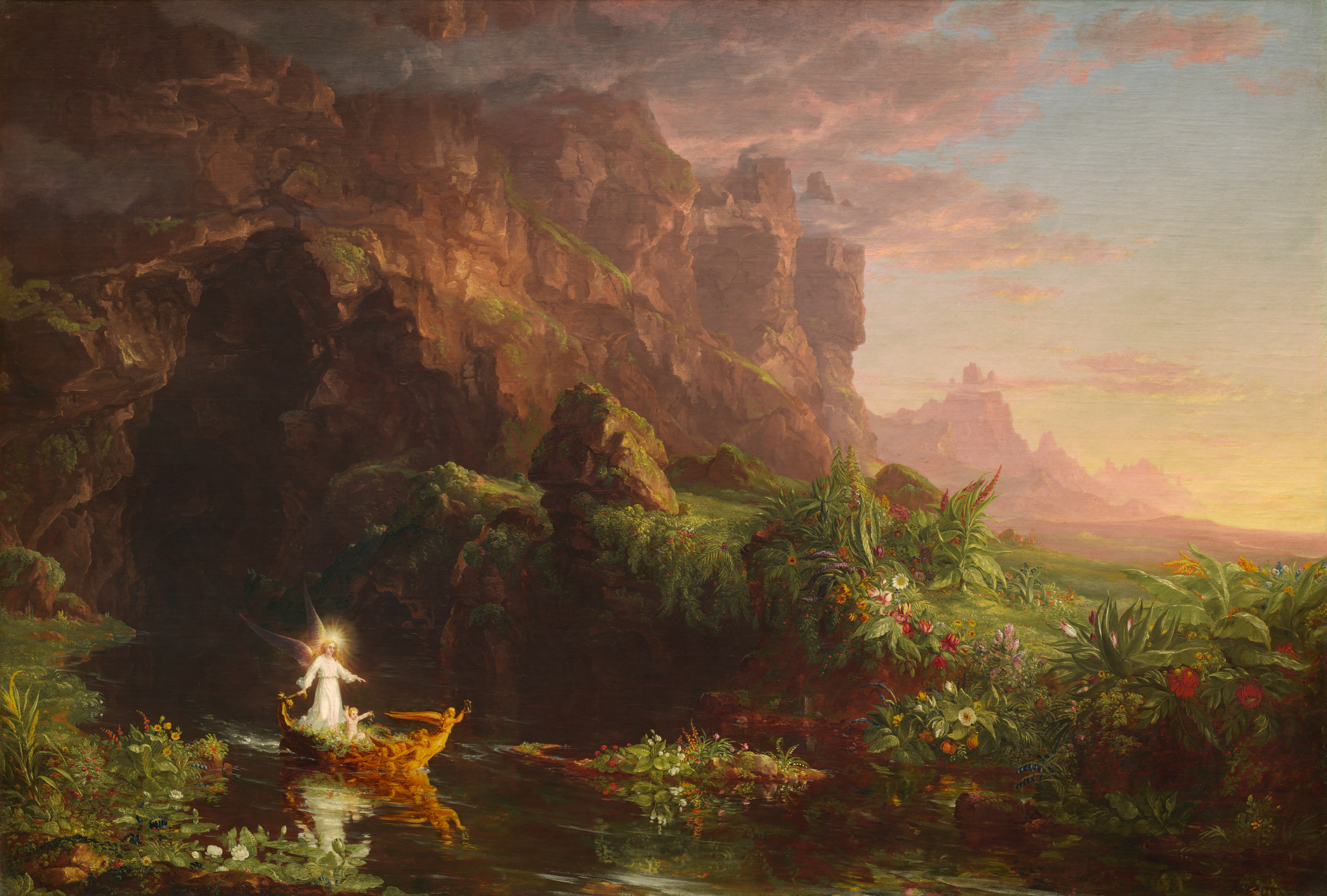
Thomas Cole, Childhood (1842), one of the four scenes in The Voyage of Life

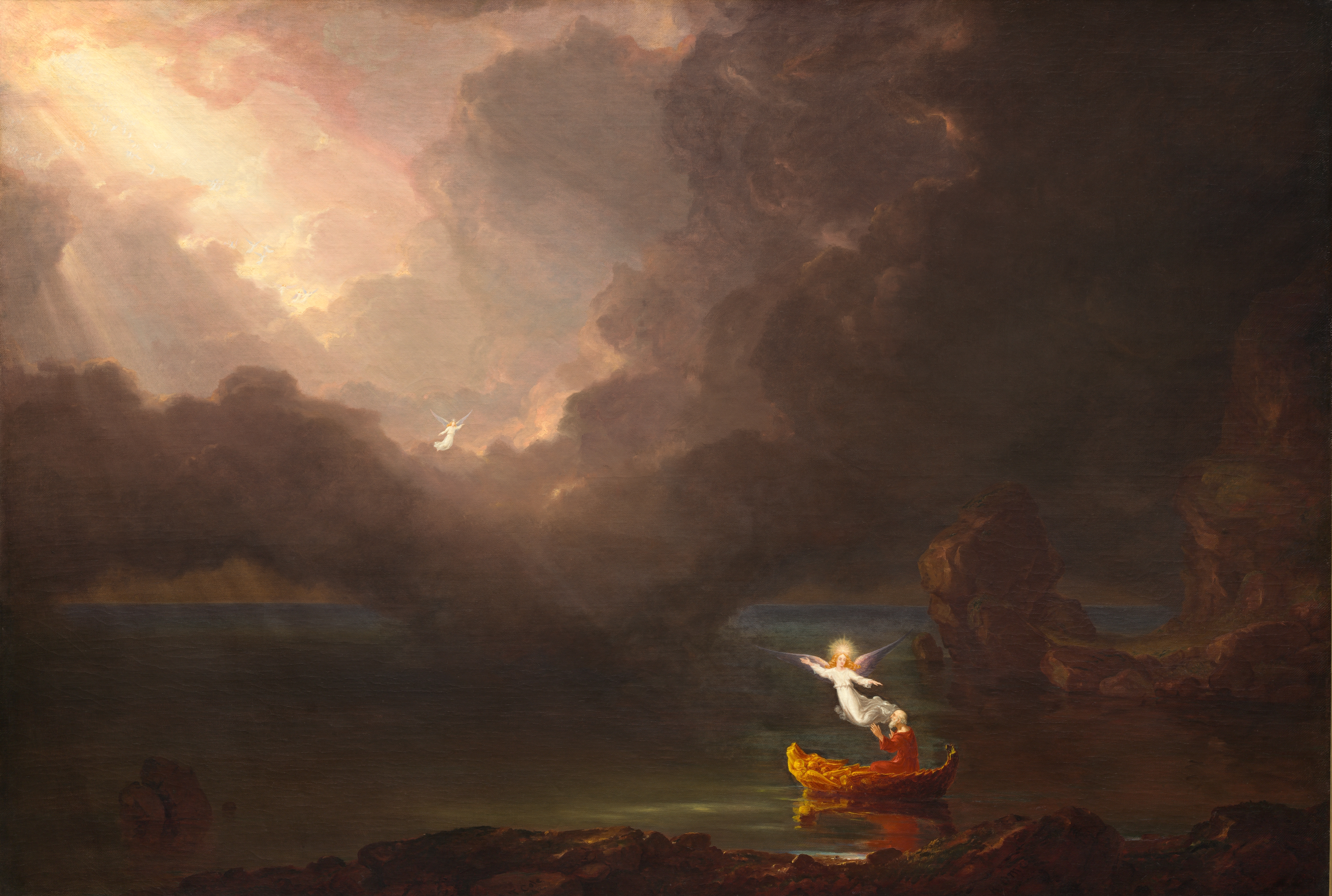
Thomas Cole, The Voyage of Life
Old Age (1842)

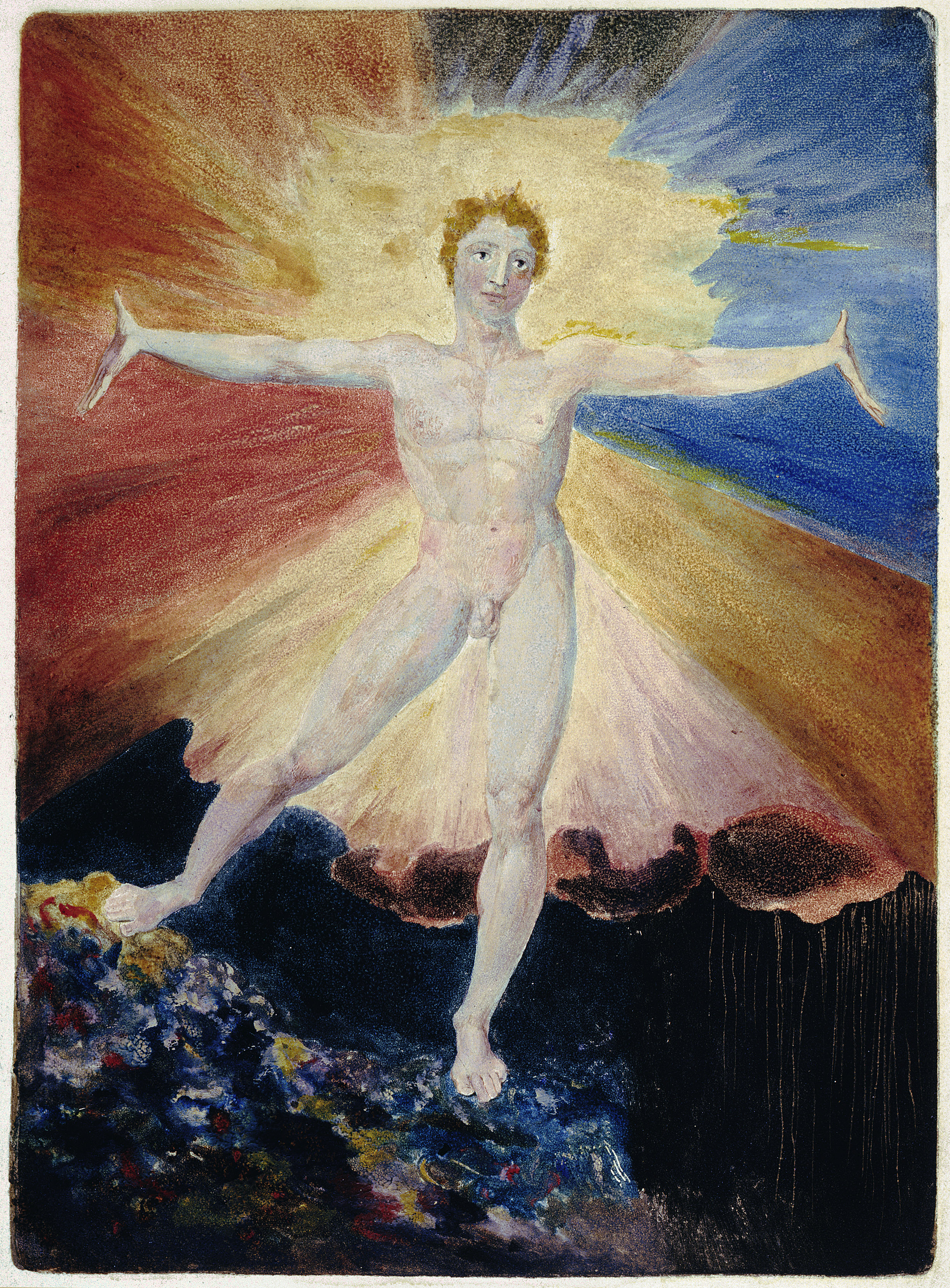
William Blake, Albion Rose, 1794–95

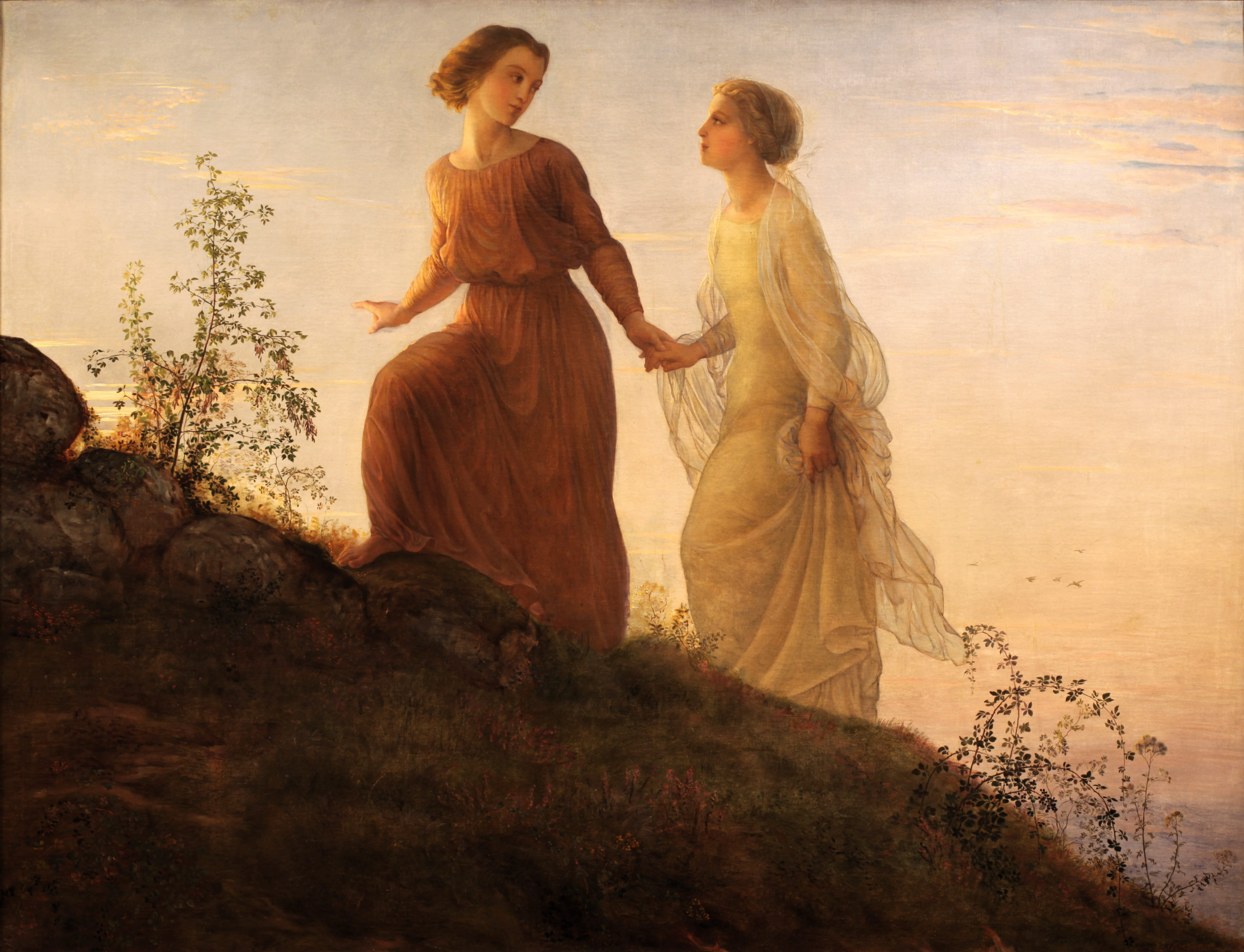
Louis Janmot, from his series The Poem of the Soul, before 1854

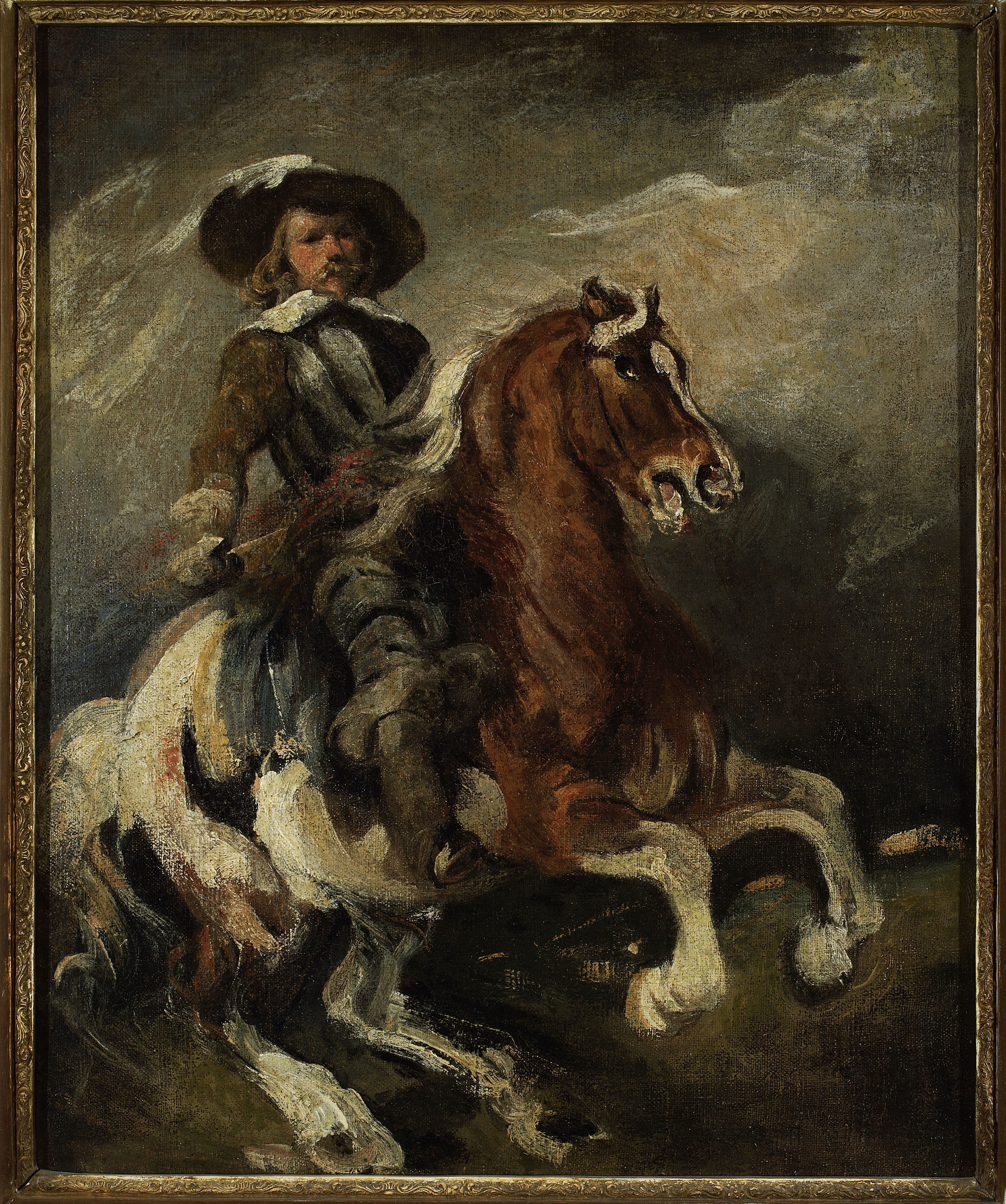
Piotr Michałowski, Reiter, c. 1840, National Museum in Warsaw

=== Other ===
Elsewhere in Europe, leading artists adopted Romantic styles: in Russia there were the portraitists Orest Kiprensky and Vasily Tropinin, with Ivan Aivazovsky specializing in marine painting, and in Norway Hans Gude painted scenes of fjords. In Poland, Piotr Michałowski (1800–1855) used a Romantic style in paintings particularly relating to the history of Napoleonic Wars. In Italy Francesco Hayez (1791–1882) was the leading artist of national Romanticism in mid-19th-century Milan. His long, prolific and extremely successful career saw him begin as a Neoclassical painter, pass right through the Romantic period, and emerge at the other end as a sentimental painter of young women. His Romantic period included many historical pieces of "Troubadour" tendencies, but on a very large scale, that are heavily influenced by Gian Battista Tiepolo and other late Baroque Italian masters.

== Sculpture ==
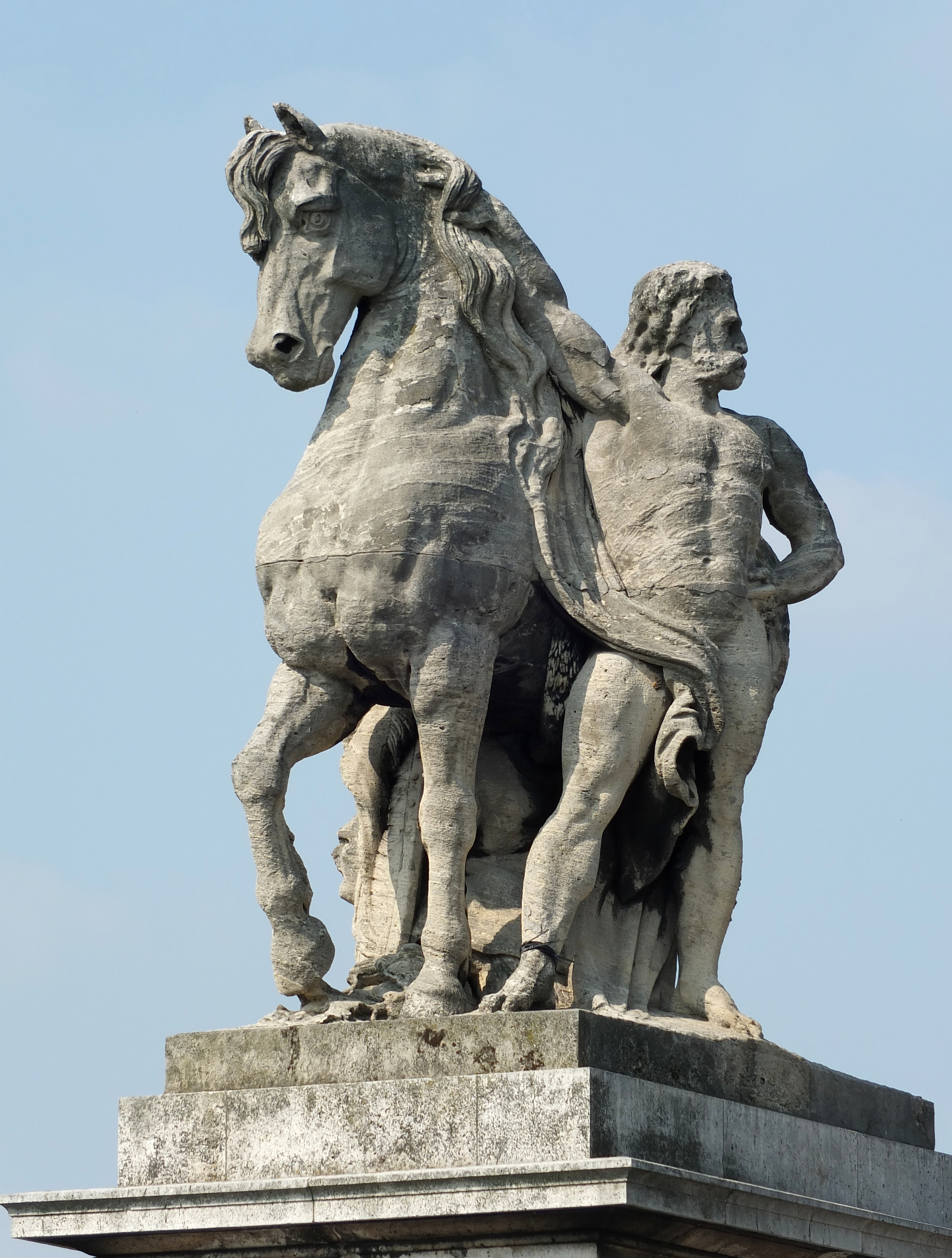
Cavalier gaulois by Antoine-Augustin Préault, Pont d'Iéna, Paris

Sculpture remained largely impervious to Romanticism, probably partly for technical reasons, as the most prestigious material of the day, marble, does not lend itself to expansive gestures. The leading sculptors in Europe, Antonio Canova and Bertel Thorvaldsen, were both based in Rome and firm Neoclassicists, not at all tempted to allow influence from medieval sculpture, which would have been one possible approach to Romantic sculpture. When it did develop, true Romantic sculpture—with the exception of a few artists such as Rudolf Maison— rather oddly was missing in Germany, and mainly found in France, with François Rude, best known from his group of the 1830s from the Arc de Triomphe in Paris, David d'Angers, and Auguste Préault. Préault's plaster relief entitled Slaughter, which represented the horrors of wars with exacerbated passion, caused so much scandal at the Salon of 1834 that Préault was banned from this official annual exhibition for nearly twenty years. In Italy, the most important Romantic sculptor was Lorenzo Bartolini.

== Gallery ==
Emerging Romanticism in the 18th century

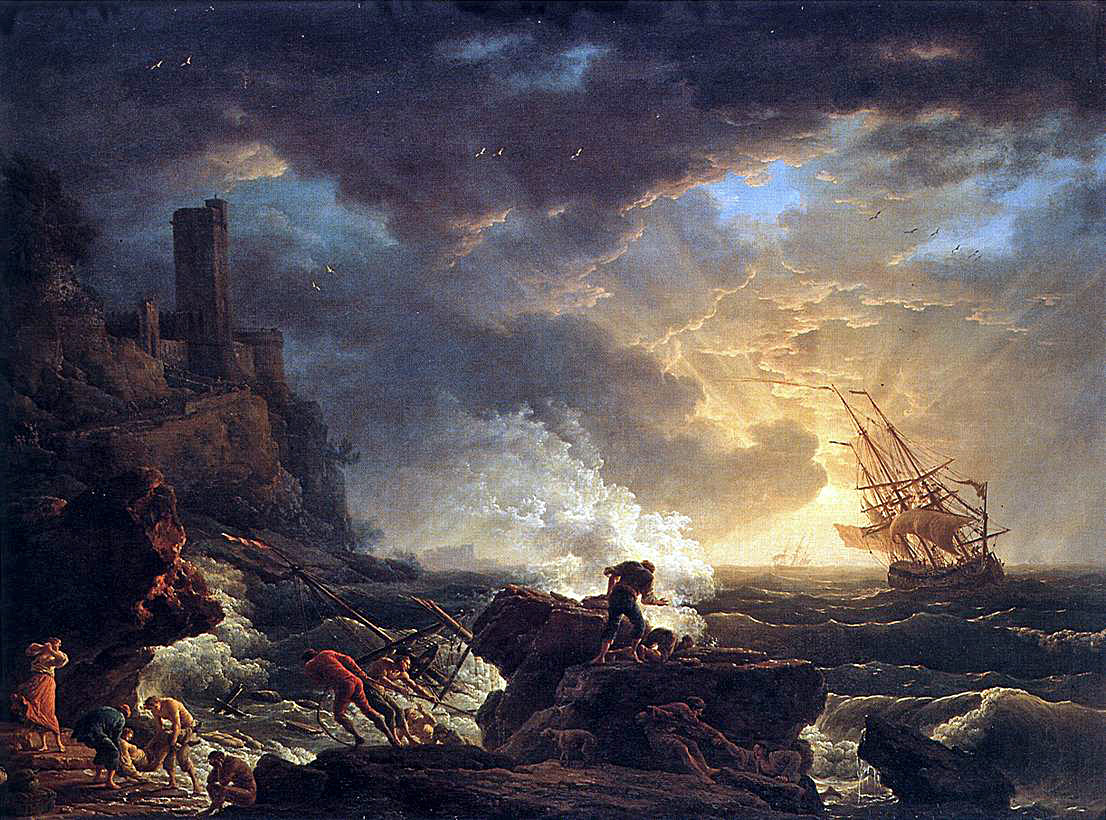
Joseph Vernet, 1759, Shipwreck; the 18th-century "sublime"

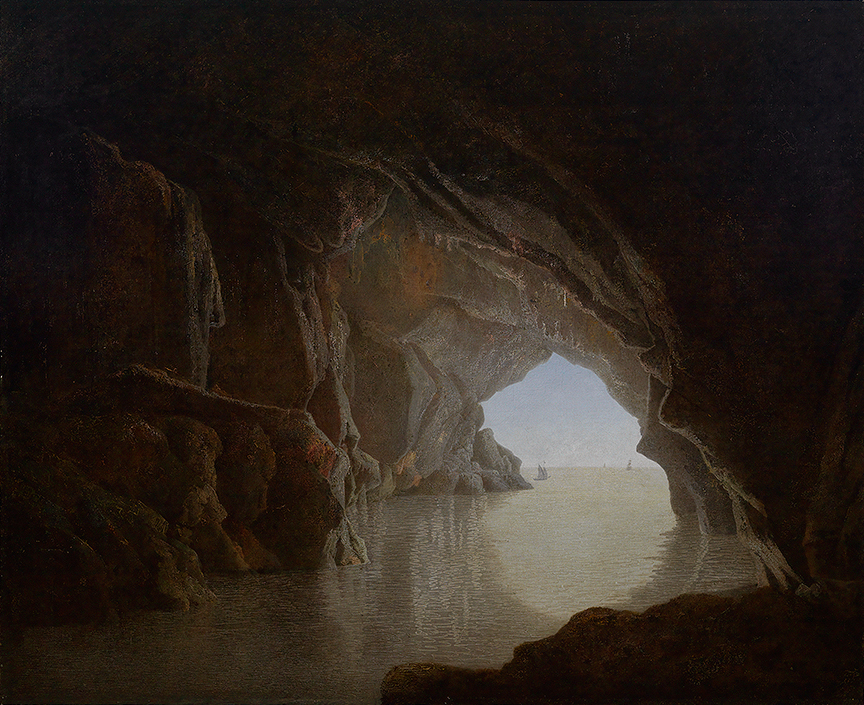
Joseph Wright, 1774, Cave at evening, Smith College Museum of Art, Northampton, Massachusetts

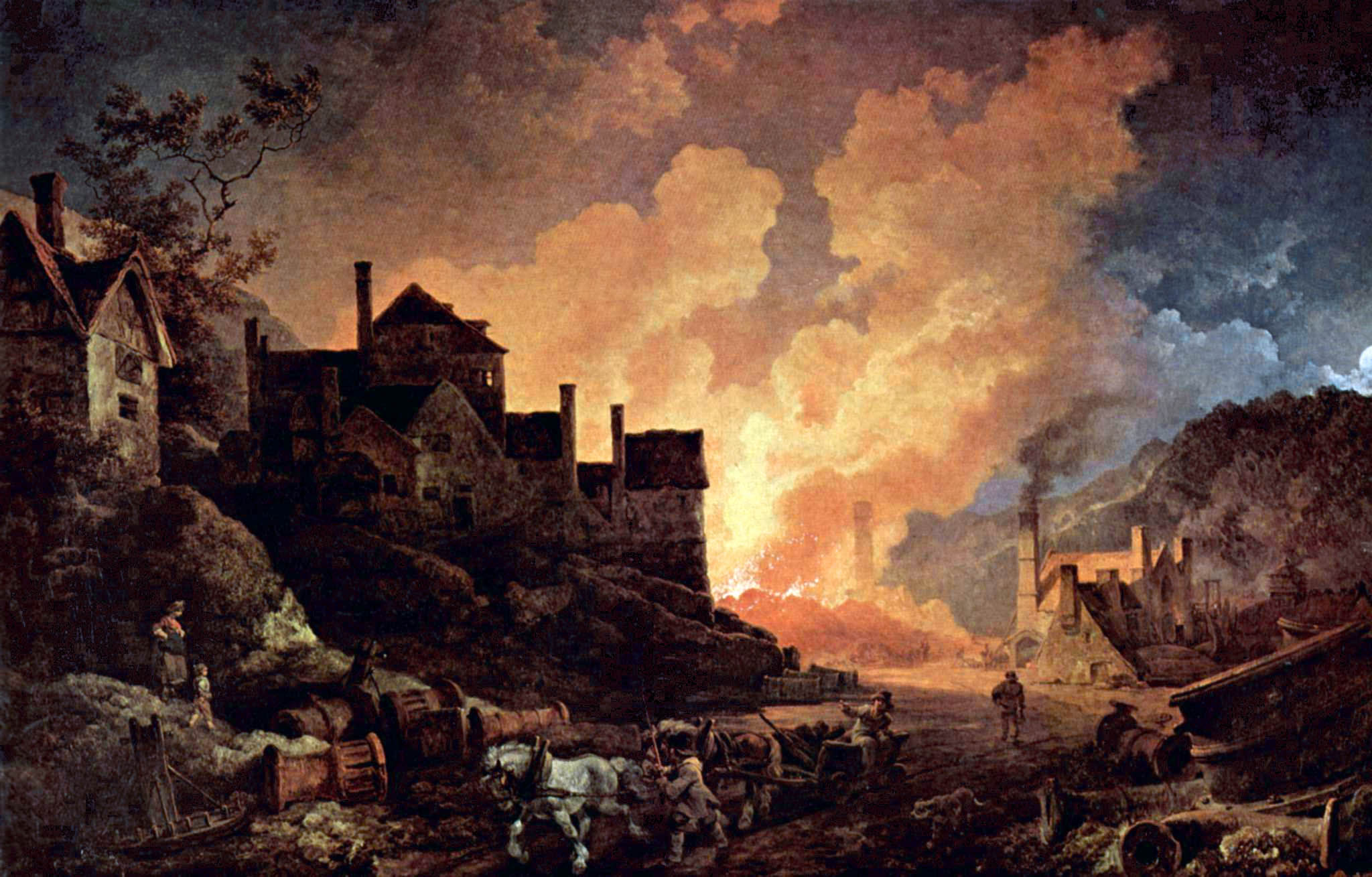
Philip James de Loutherbourg, Coalbrookdale by Night, 1801, a key location of the English Industrial Revolution

French Romantic painting

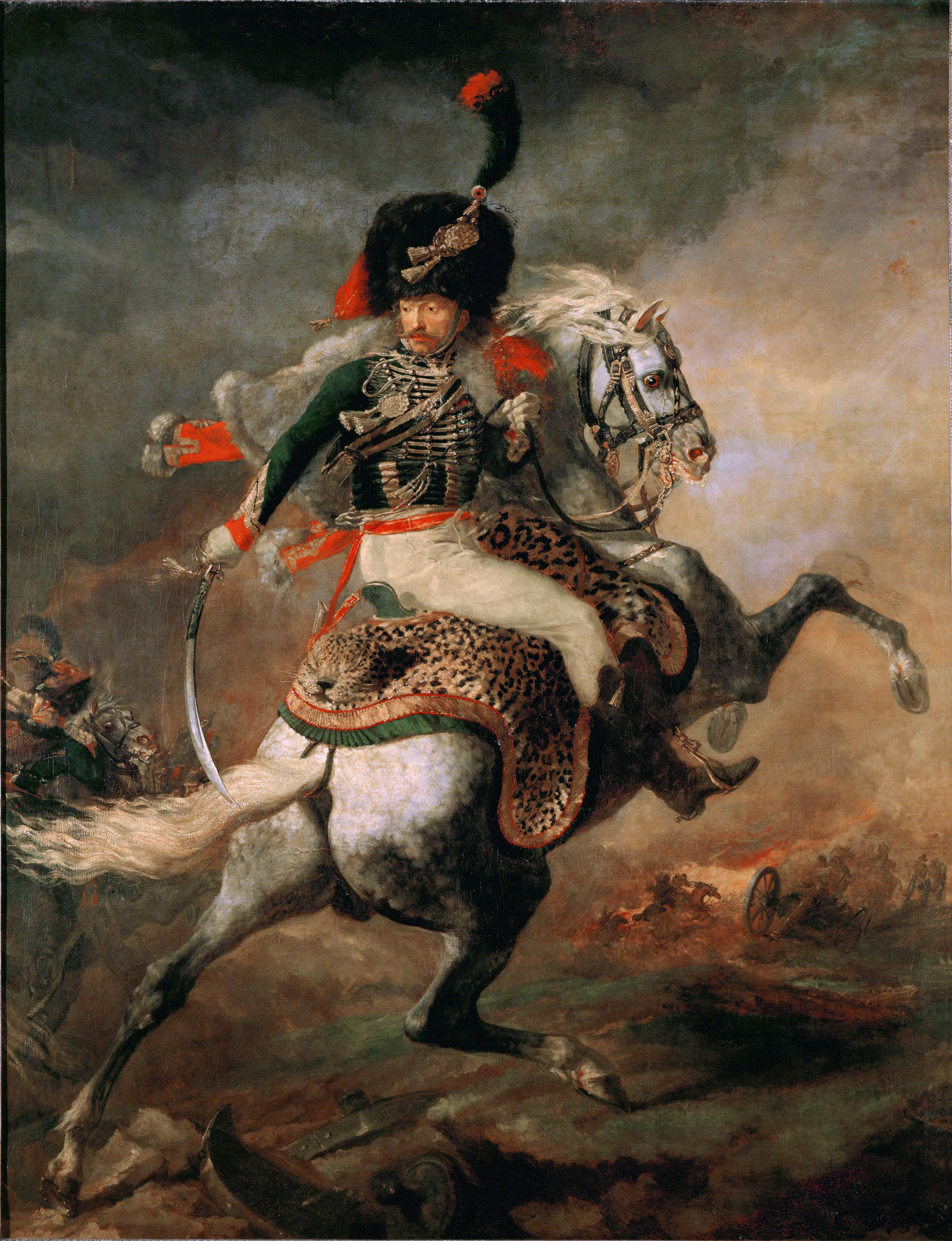
Théodore Géricault, The Charging Chasseur, c. 1812

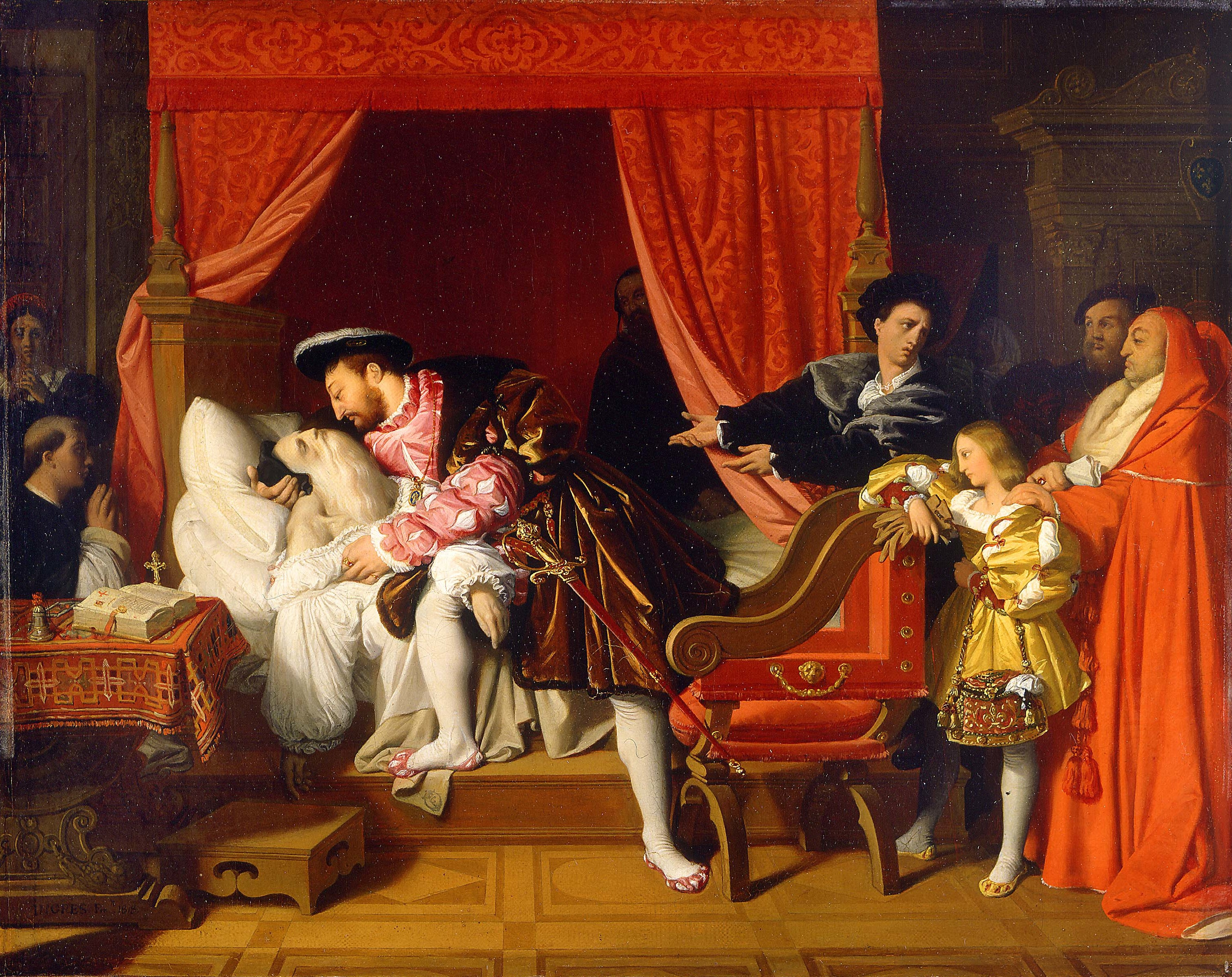
Ingres, The Death of Leonardo da Vinci, 1818, one of his Troubadour style works

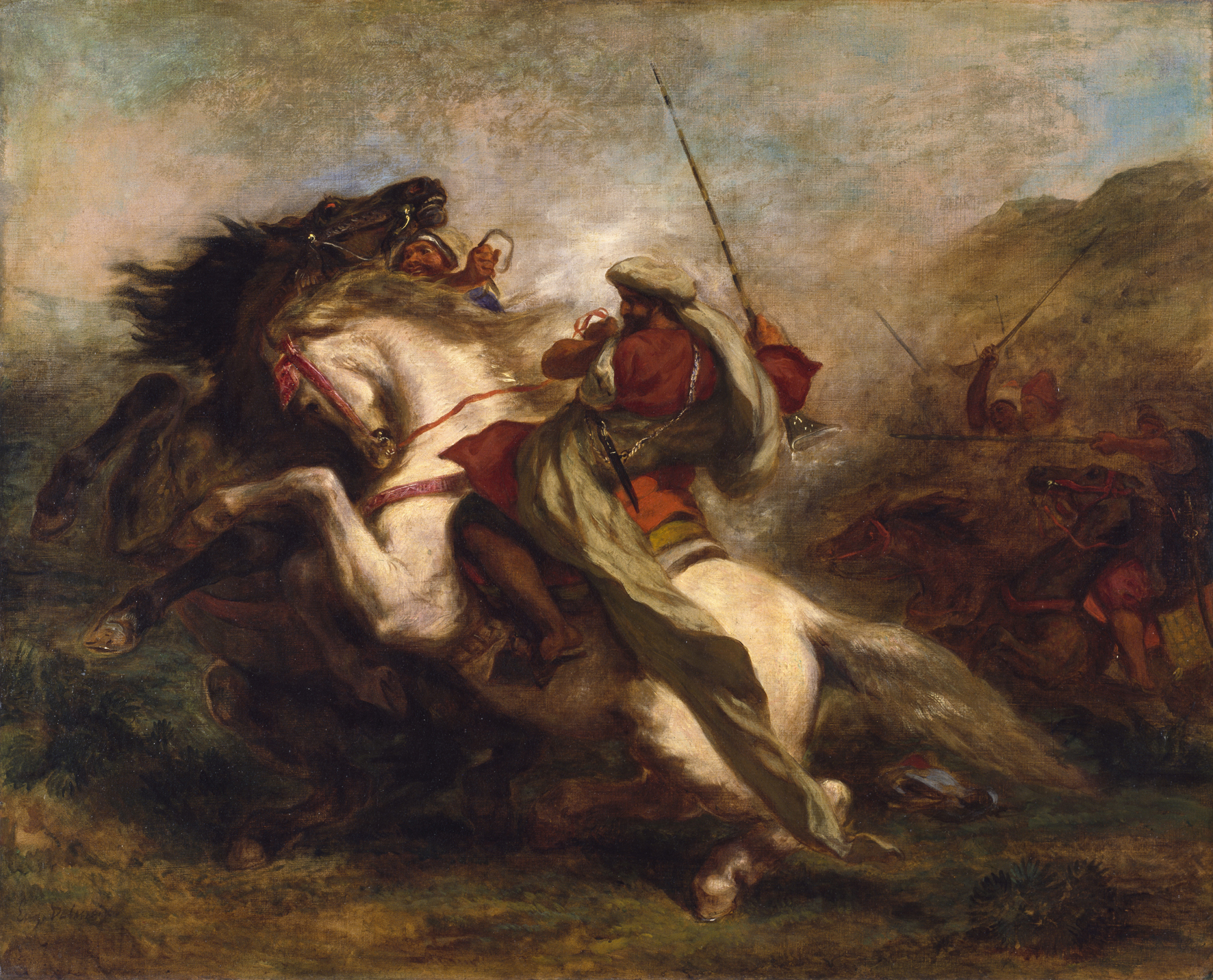
Eugène Delacroix, Collision of Moorish Horsemen, 1843–44

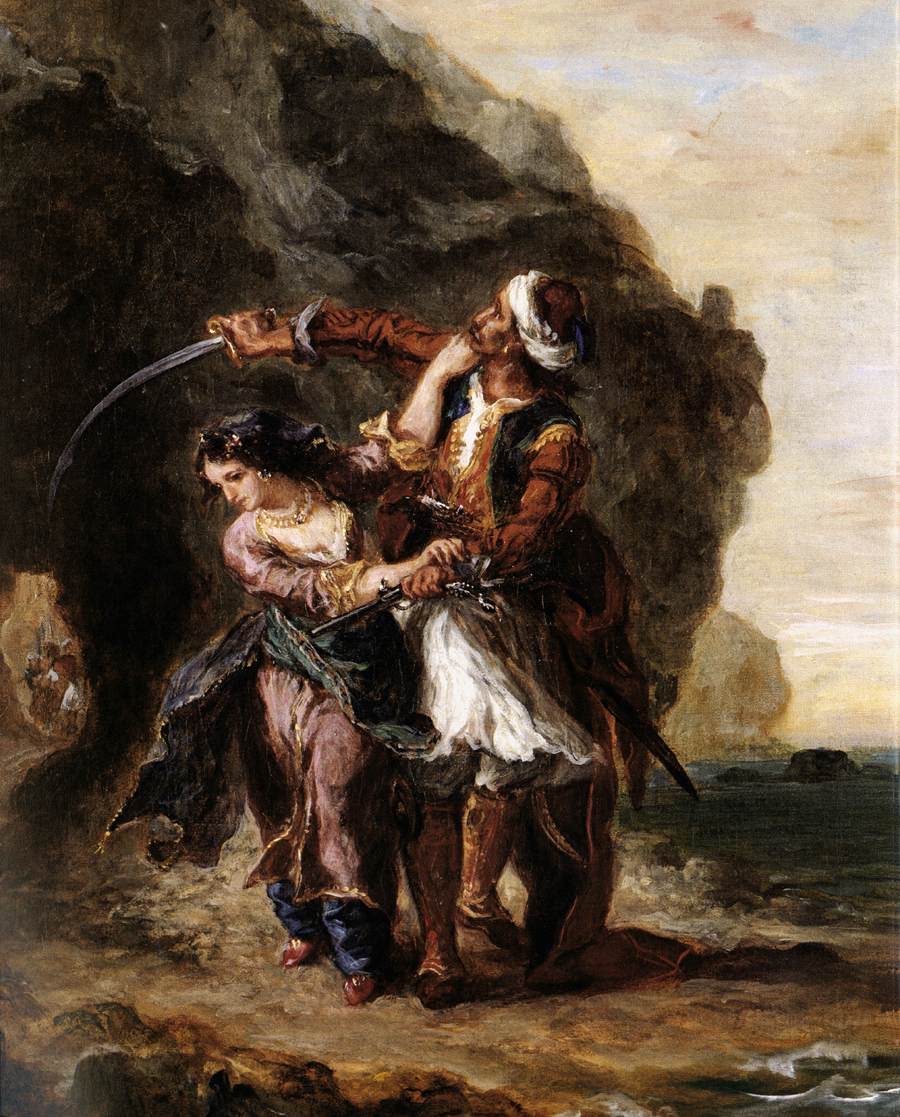
Eugène Delacroix, The Bride of Abydos, 1857, after the poem by Byron

Other

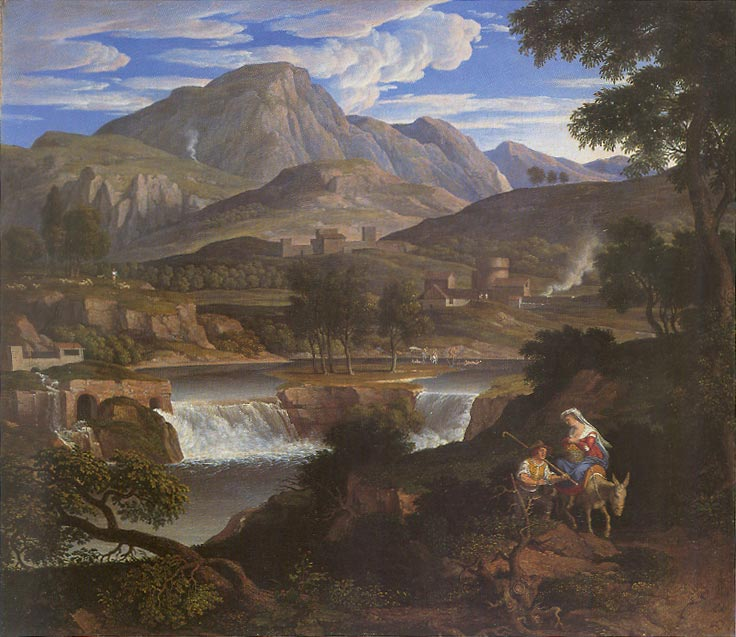
Joseph Anton Koch, Waterfalls at Subiaco, 1812–1813, a "classical" landscape to art historians

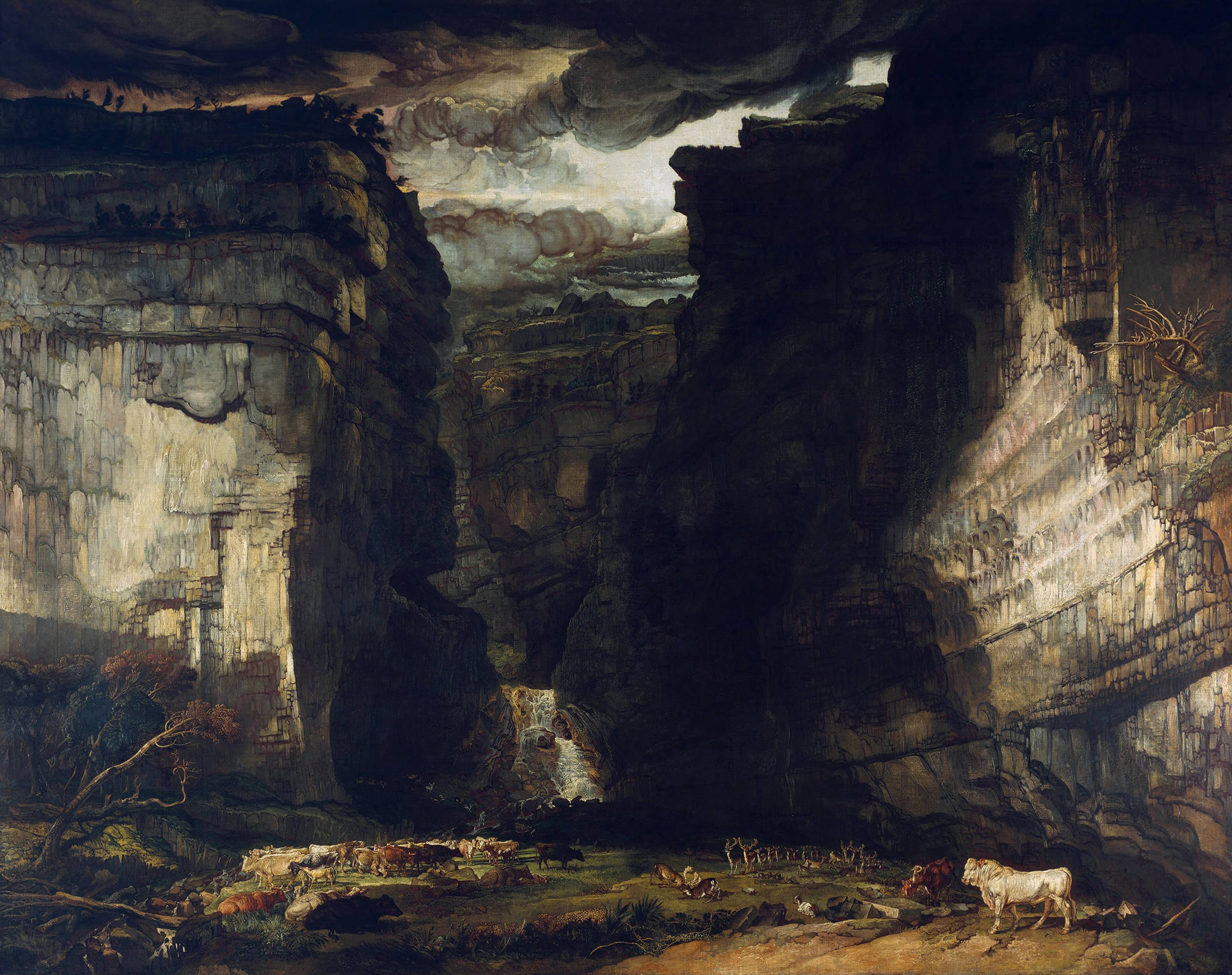
James Ward, 1814–1815, Gordale Scar

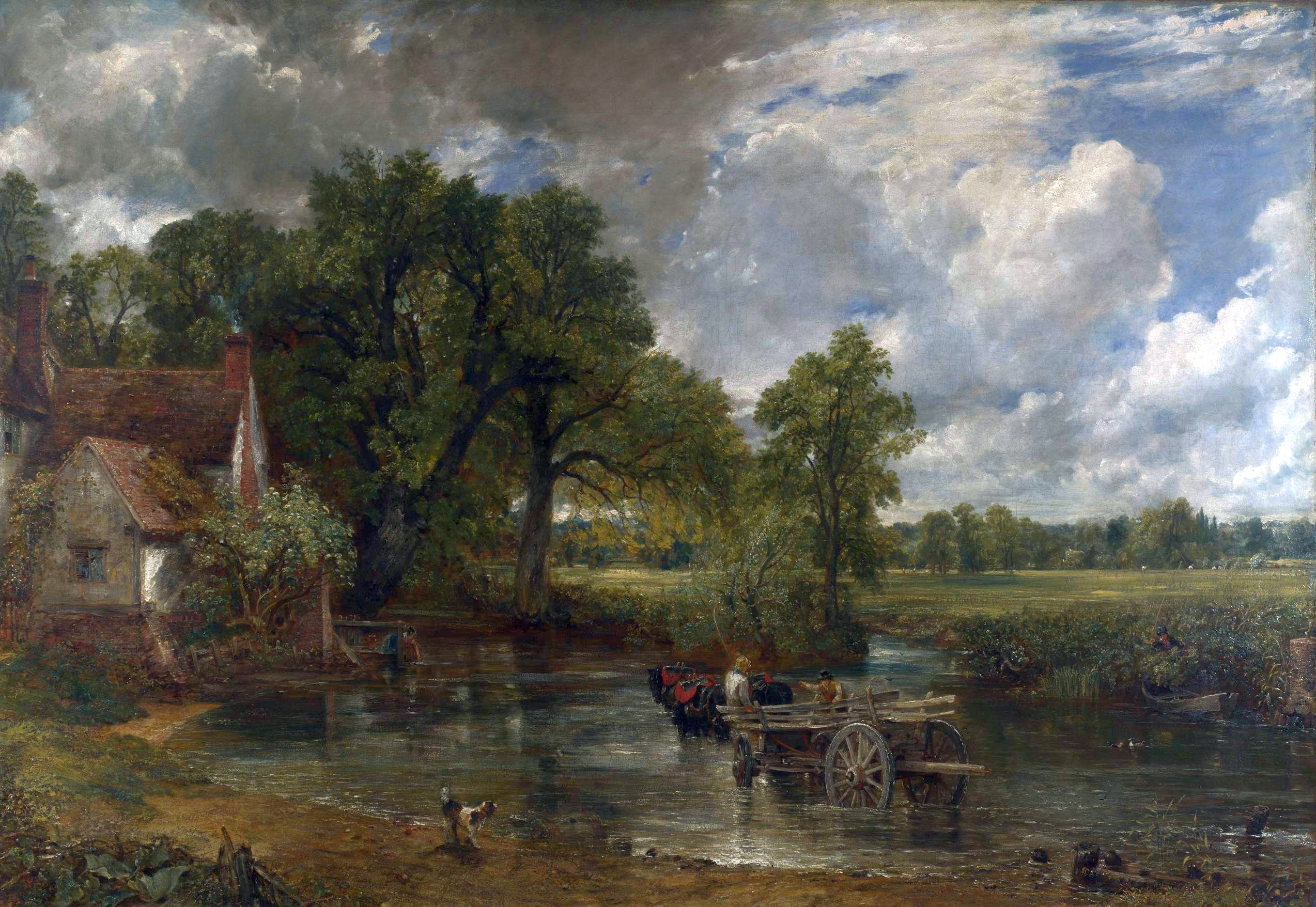
John Constable, 1821, The Hay Wain, one of Constable's large "six footers"

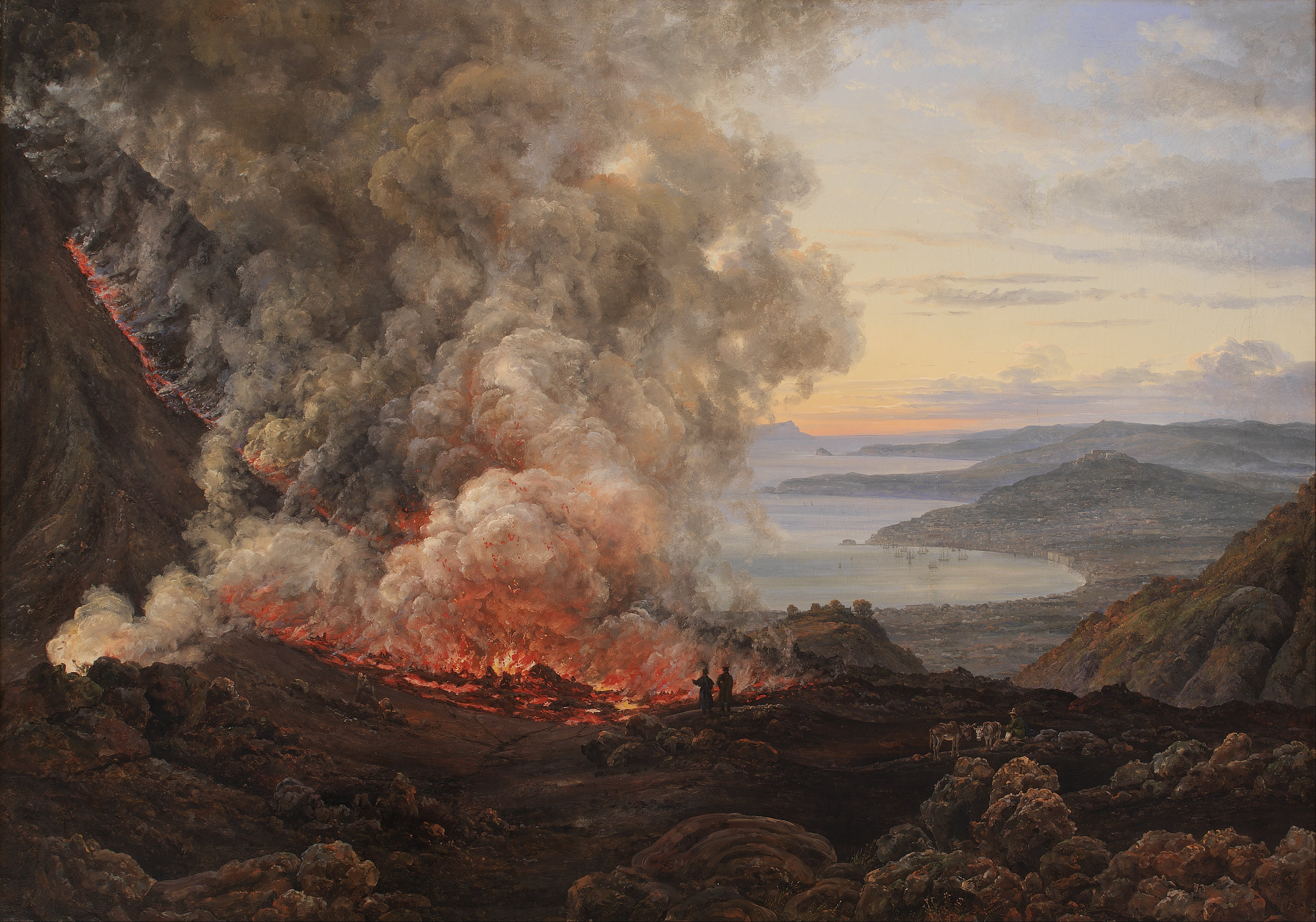
J. C. Dahl, 1826, Eruption of Vesuvius, by Friedrich's closest follower

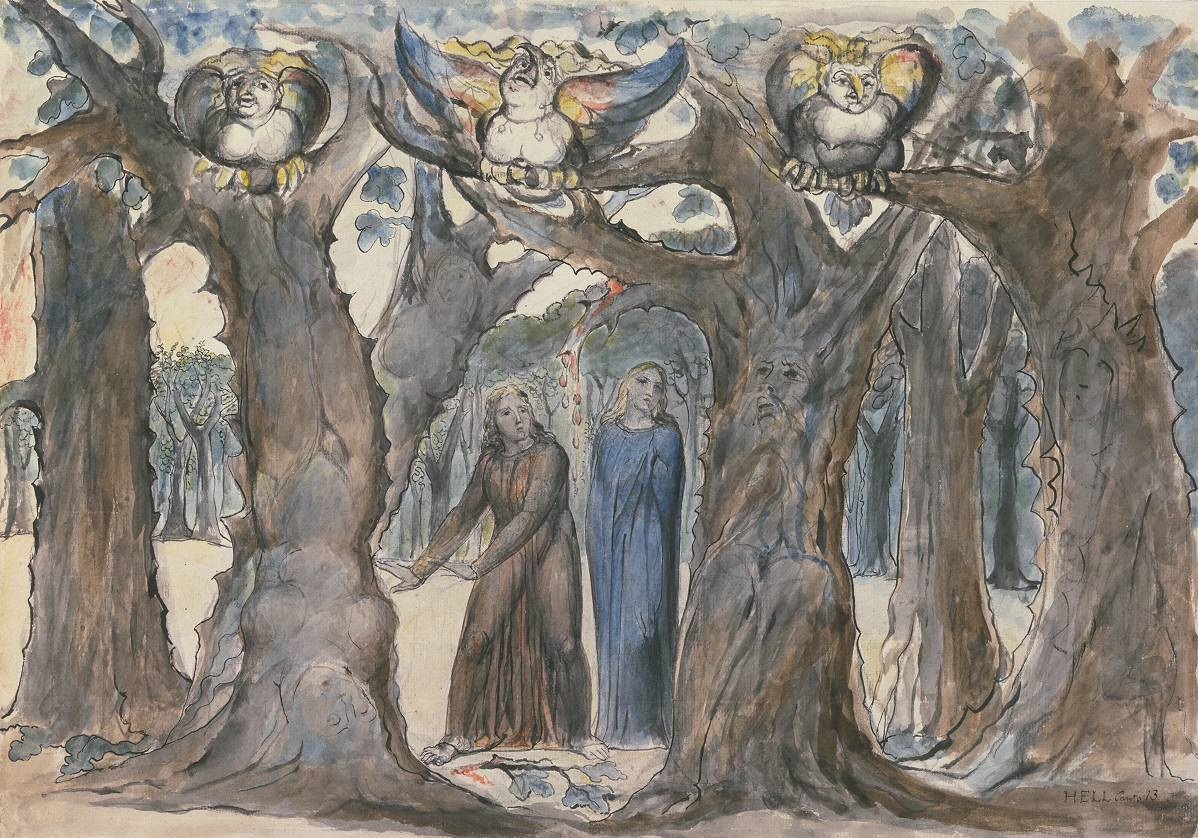
William Blake, c. 1824–27, The Wood of the Self-Murderers: The Harpies and the Suicides, Tate

Karl Bryullov, The Last Day of Pompeii, 1833, The State Russian Museum, St. Petersburg, Russia

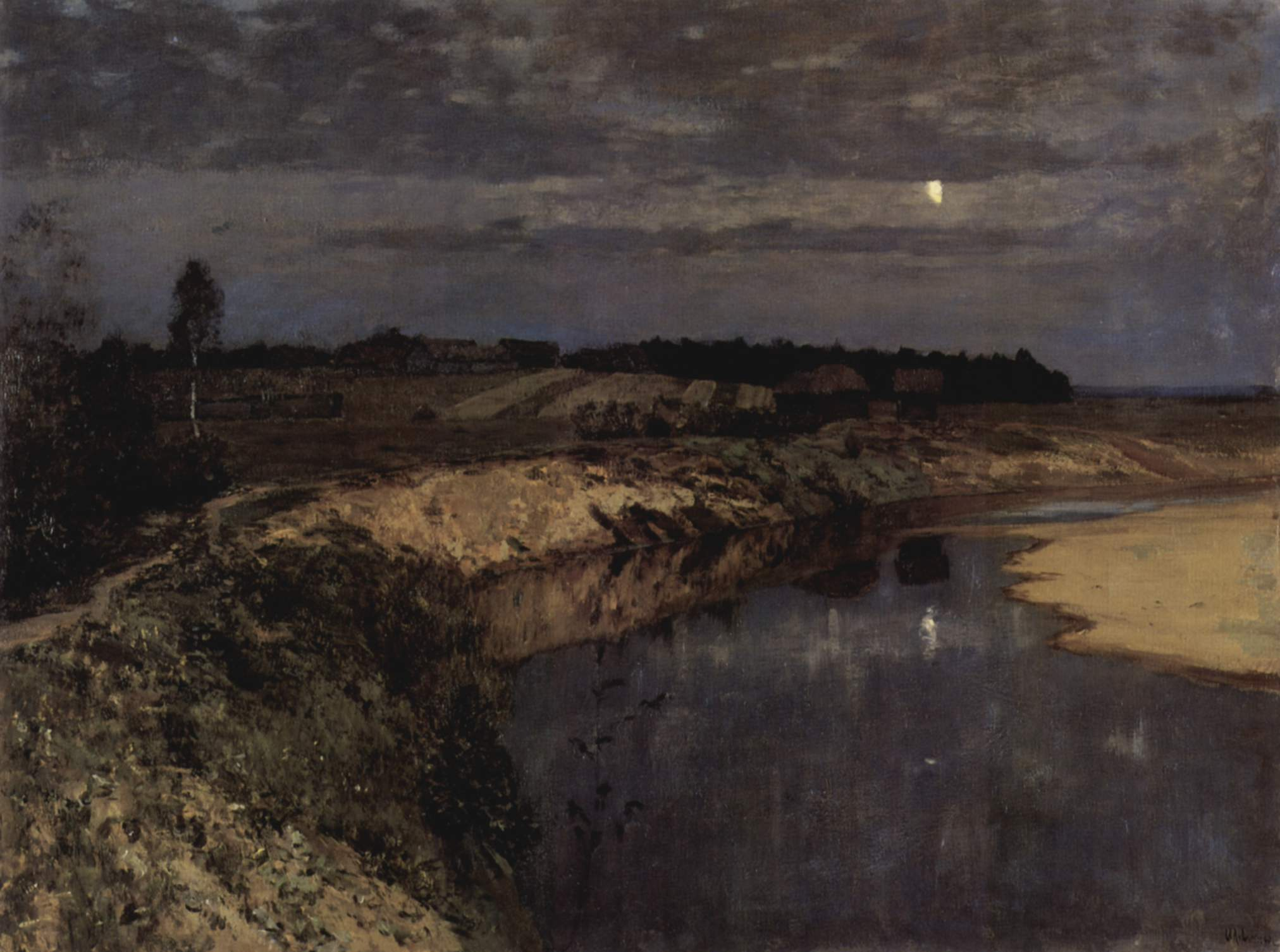
Isaac Levitan, Pacific, 1898, State Russian Museum, St.Petersburg

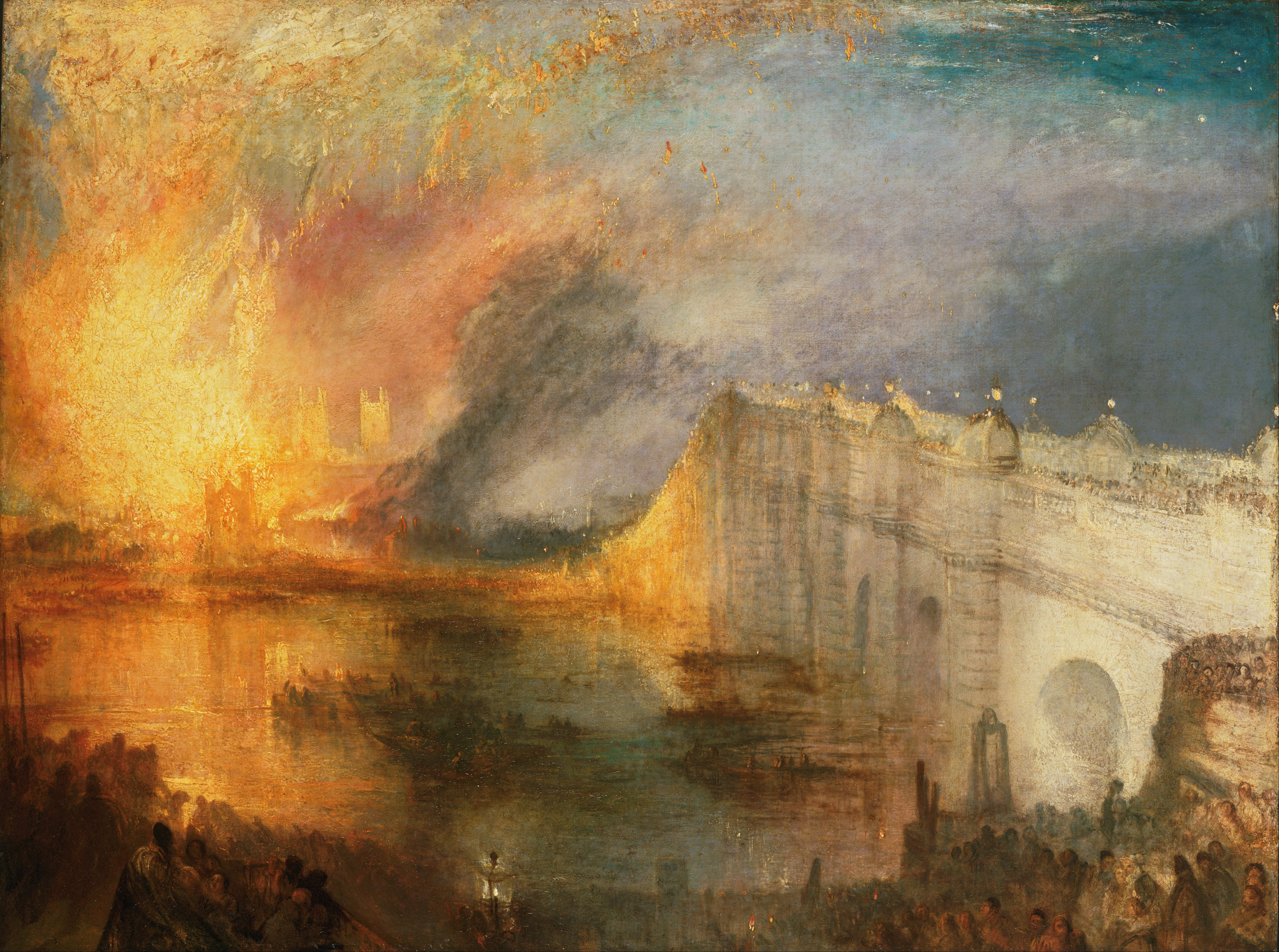
J. M. W. Turner, The Burning of the Houses of Lords and Commons (1835), Philadelphia Museum of Art

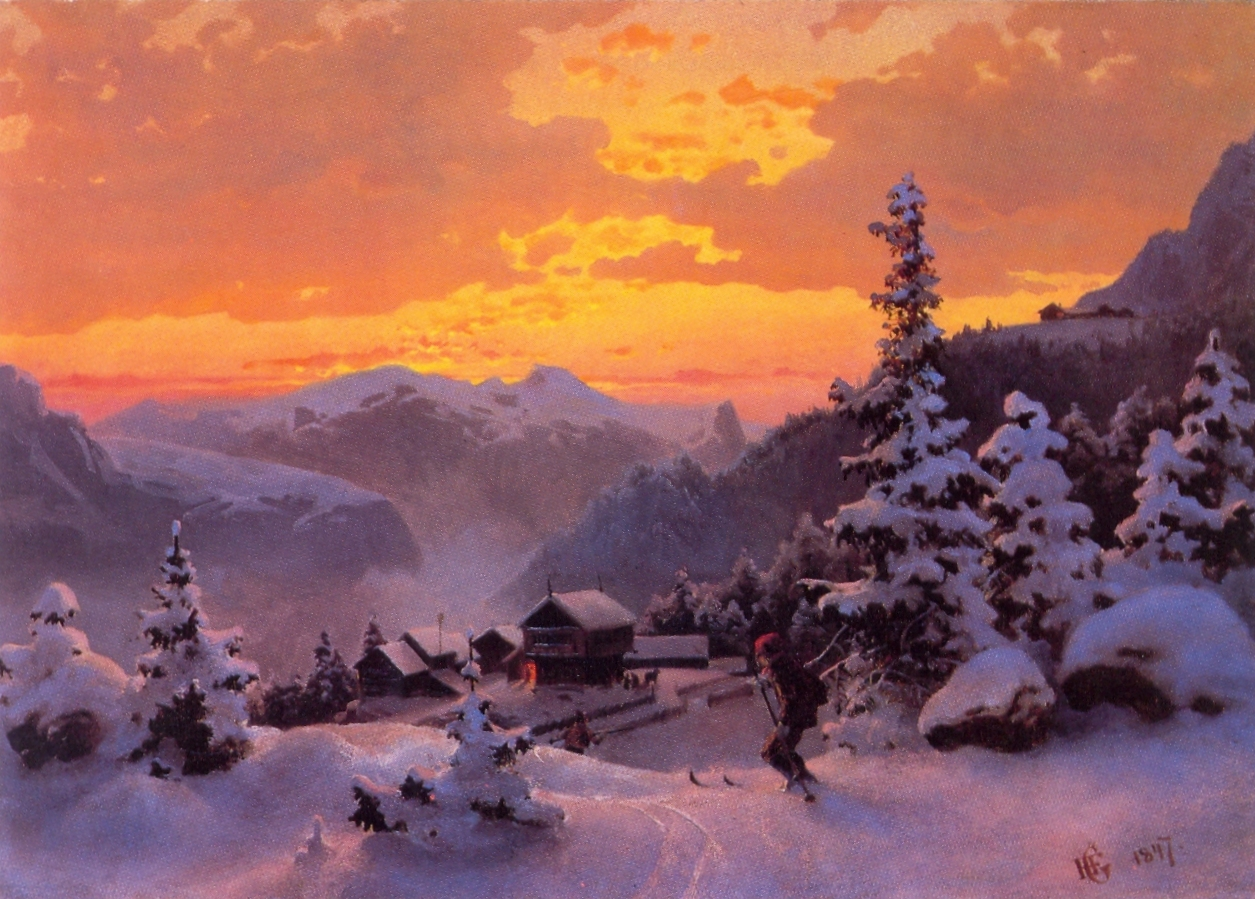
Hans Gude, Winter Afternoon, 1847, National Gallery of Norway, Oslo

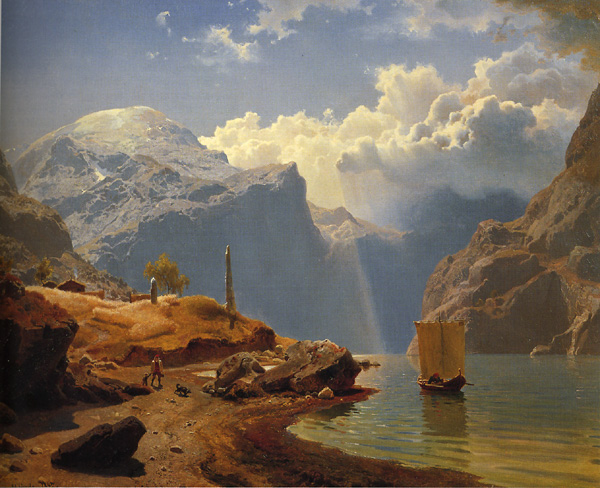
Hans Gude, Fra Hardanger, 1847. Example of Norwegian romantic nationalism.

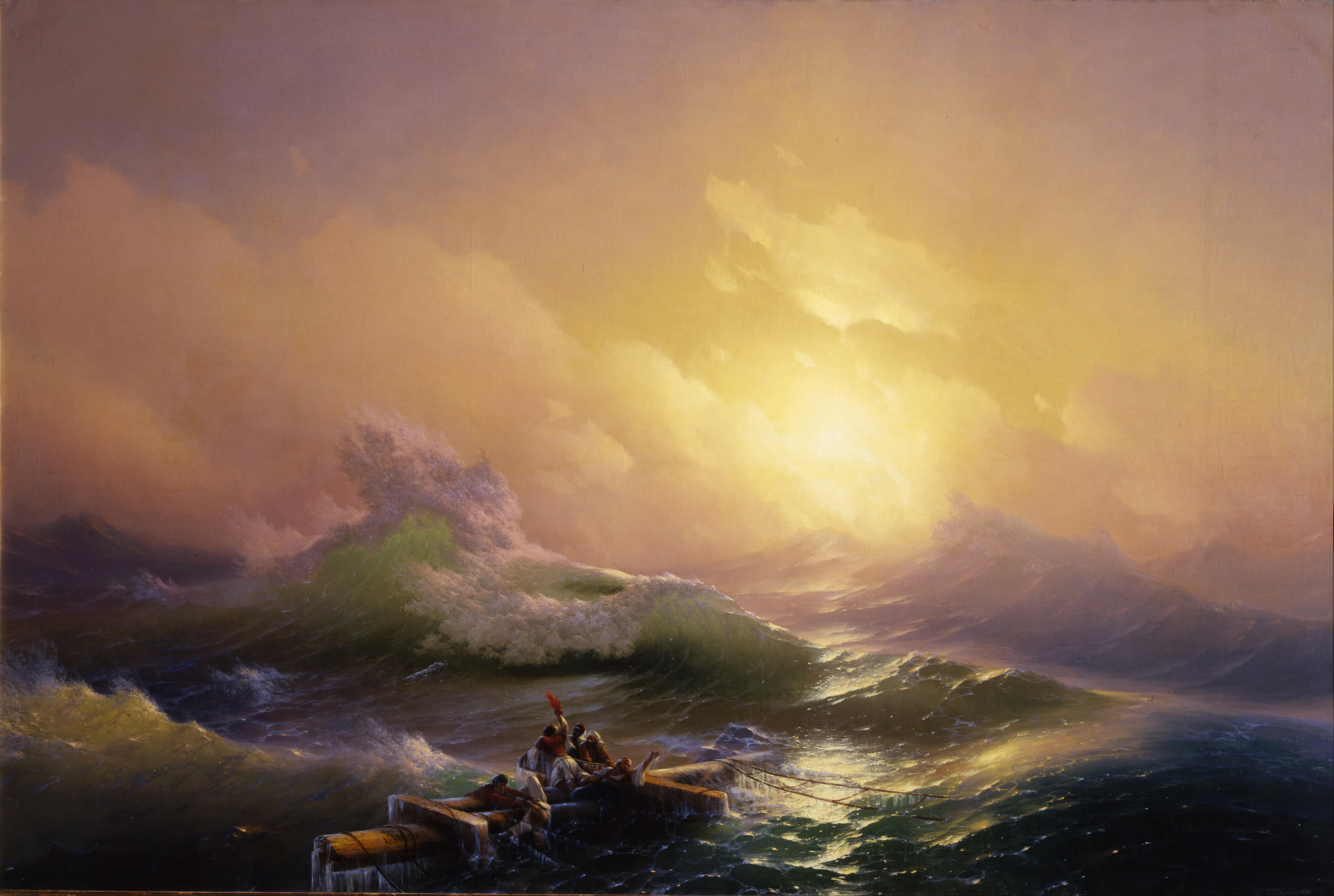
Ivan Aivazovsky, 1850, The Ninth Wave, Russian Museum, St. Petersburg

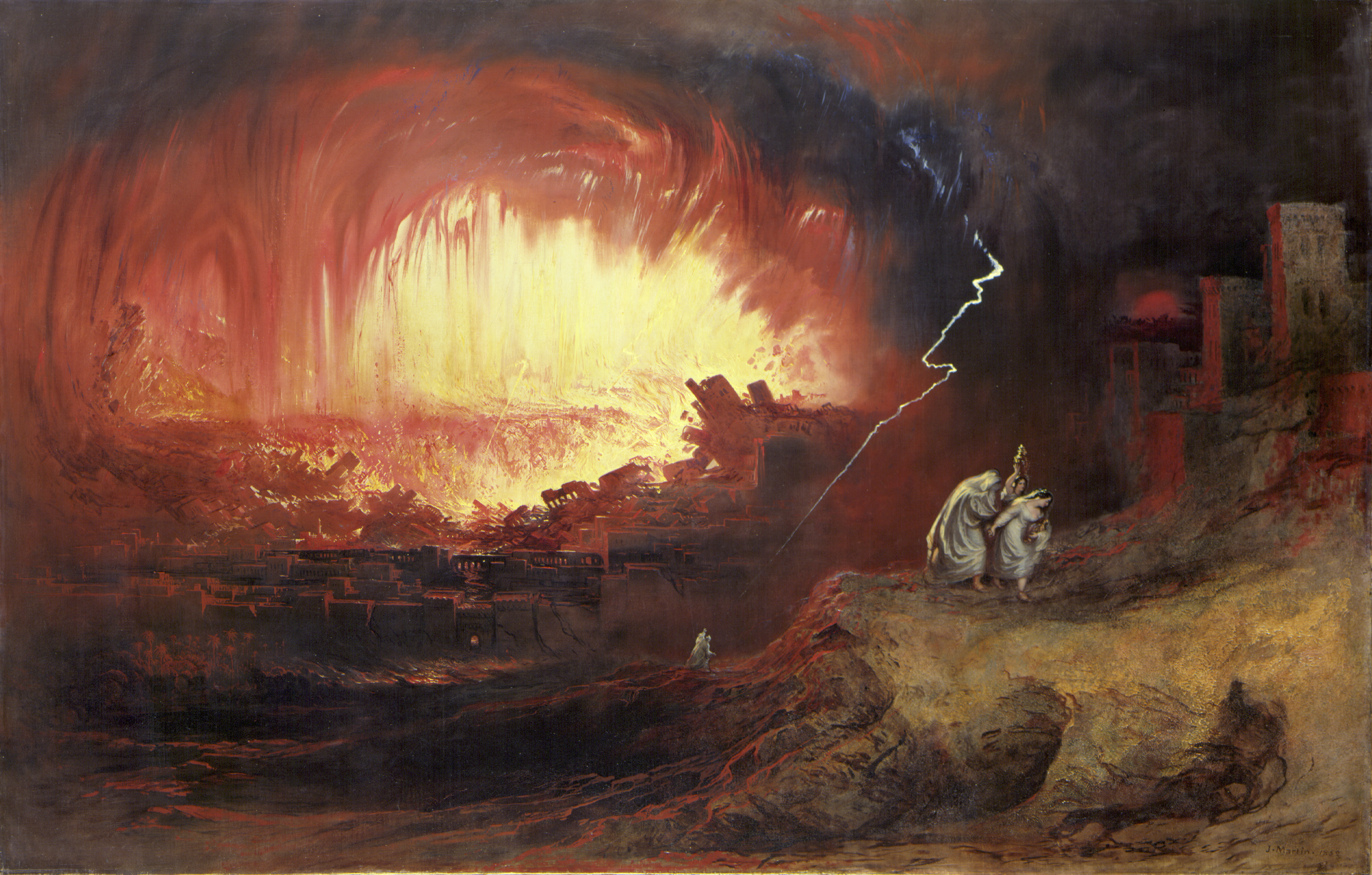
John Martin, 1852, The Destruction of Sodom and Gomorrah, Laing Art Gallery

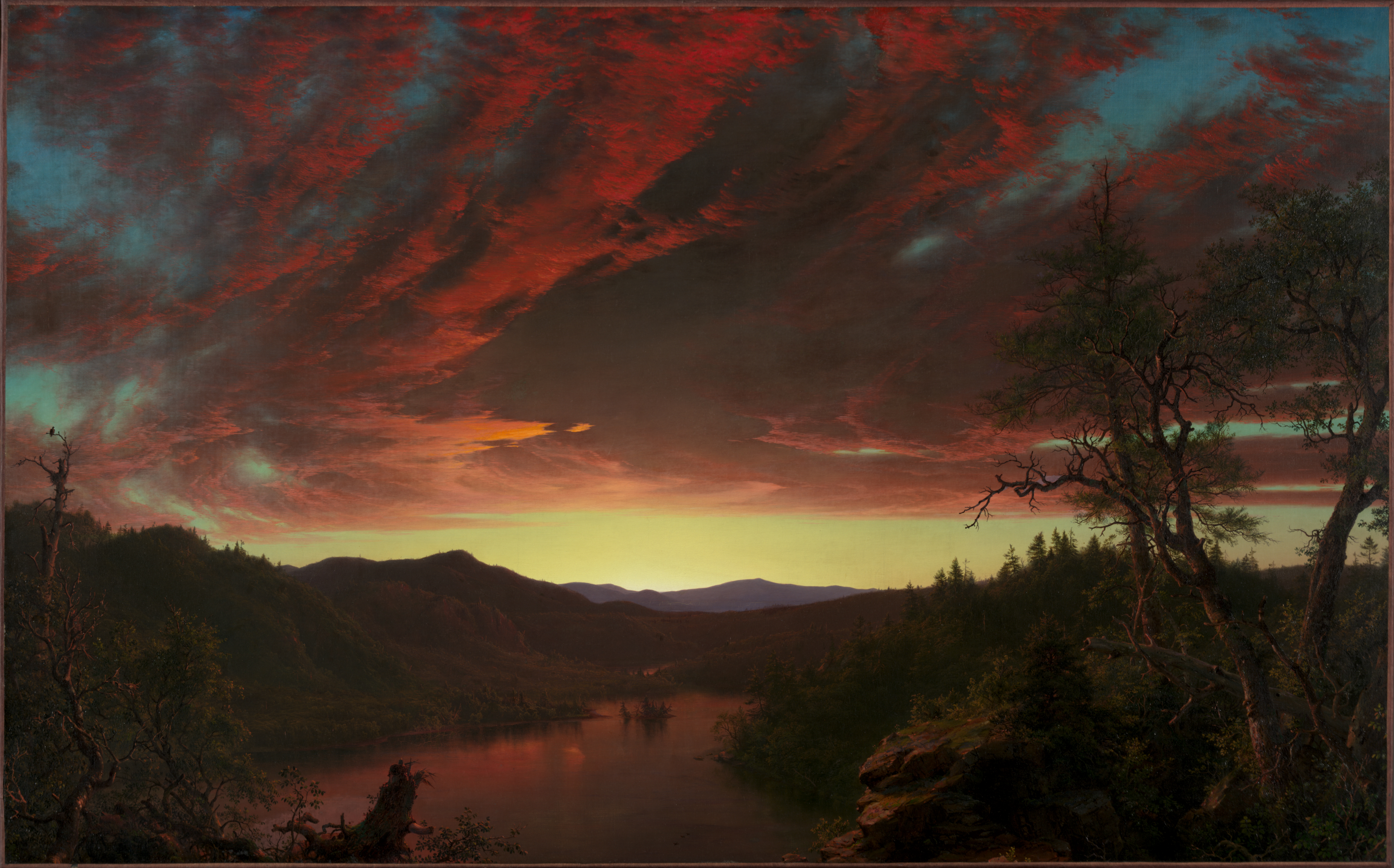
Frederic Edwin Church, 1860, Twilight in the Wilderness, Cleveland Museum of Art

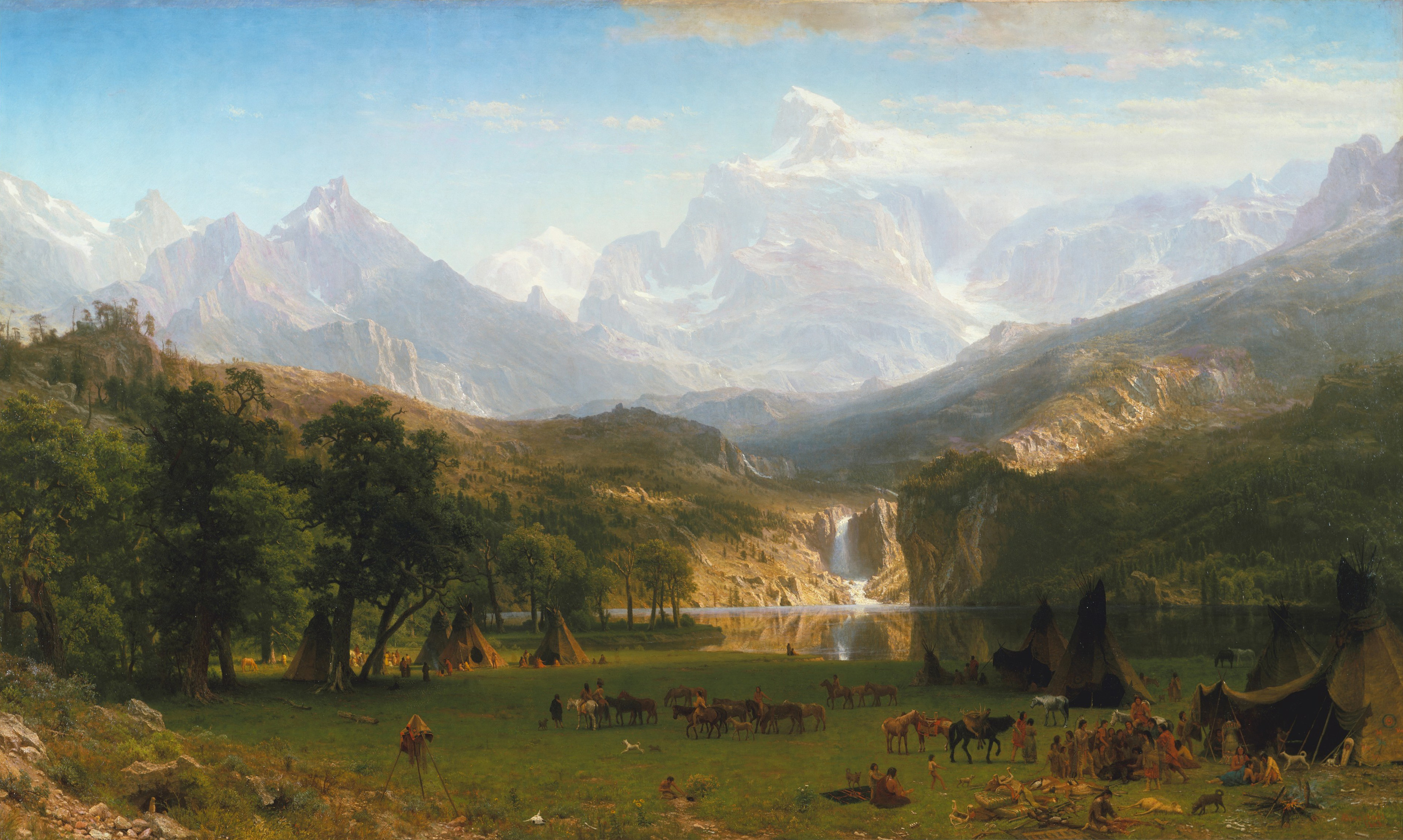
Albert Bierstadt, 1863, The Rocky Mountains, Lander's Peak

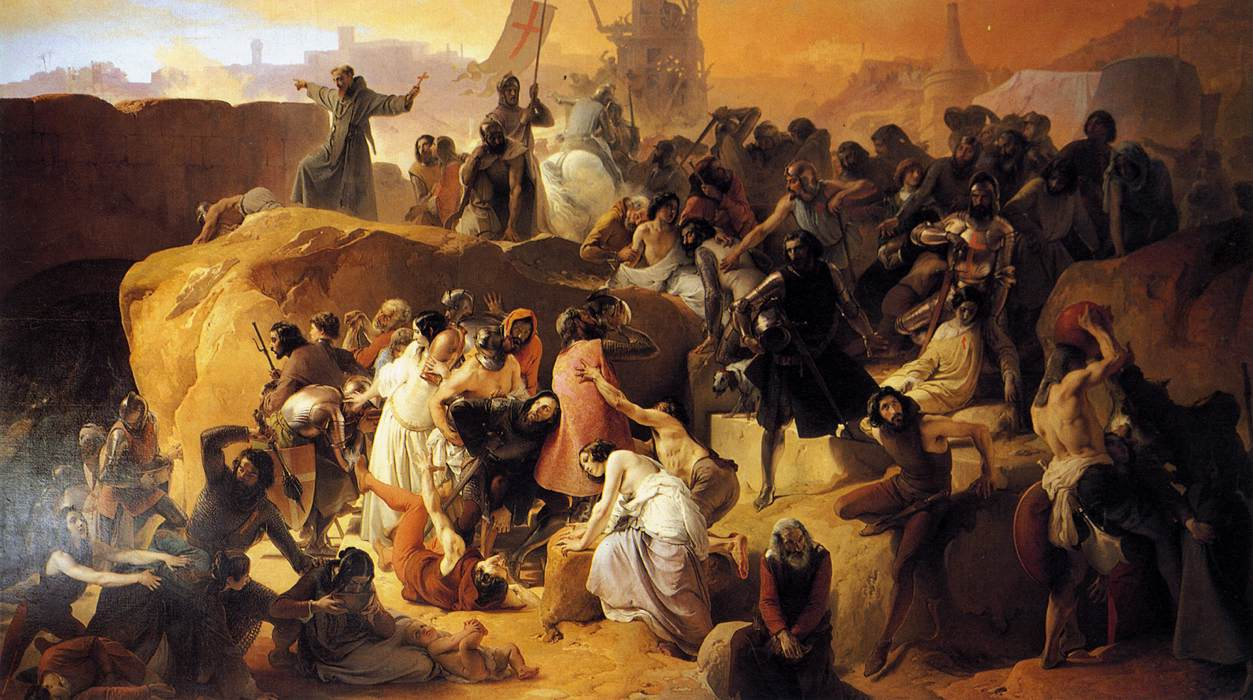
Francesco Hayez, Crusaders Thirsting near Jerusalem (1836–50), Palazzo Reale, Turin

== Sources ==
- Friedlaender, Walter, David to Delacroix, (Originally published in German; reprinted 1980) 1952.
- Honour, Hugh, Neo-classicism, 1968, Pelican.
- Hughes, Robert. Goya. New York: Alfred A. Knopf, 2004. ISBN 0-394-58028-1.
- (in Polish) Masłowski, Maciej, Piotr Michałowski, Warsaw, 1957, Arkady Publishers
- Novotny, Fritz, Painting and Sculpture in Europe, 1780–1880 (Pelican History of Art), Yale University Press, 2nd edn. 1971 ISBN 0-14-056120-X.
- Noon, Patrick (ed), Crossing the Channel, British and French Painting in the Age of Romanticism, 2003, Tate Publishing/Metropolitan Museum of Art.
- Vaughan, William (2004). Friedrich. Oxford: Phaidon Press. ISBN 978-0-7148-4060-4.
