= The Wood of the Self-Murderers: The Harpies and the Suicides =

Painting by William Blake

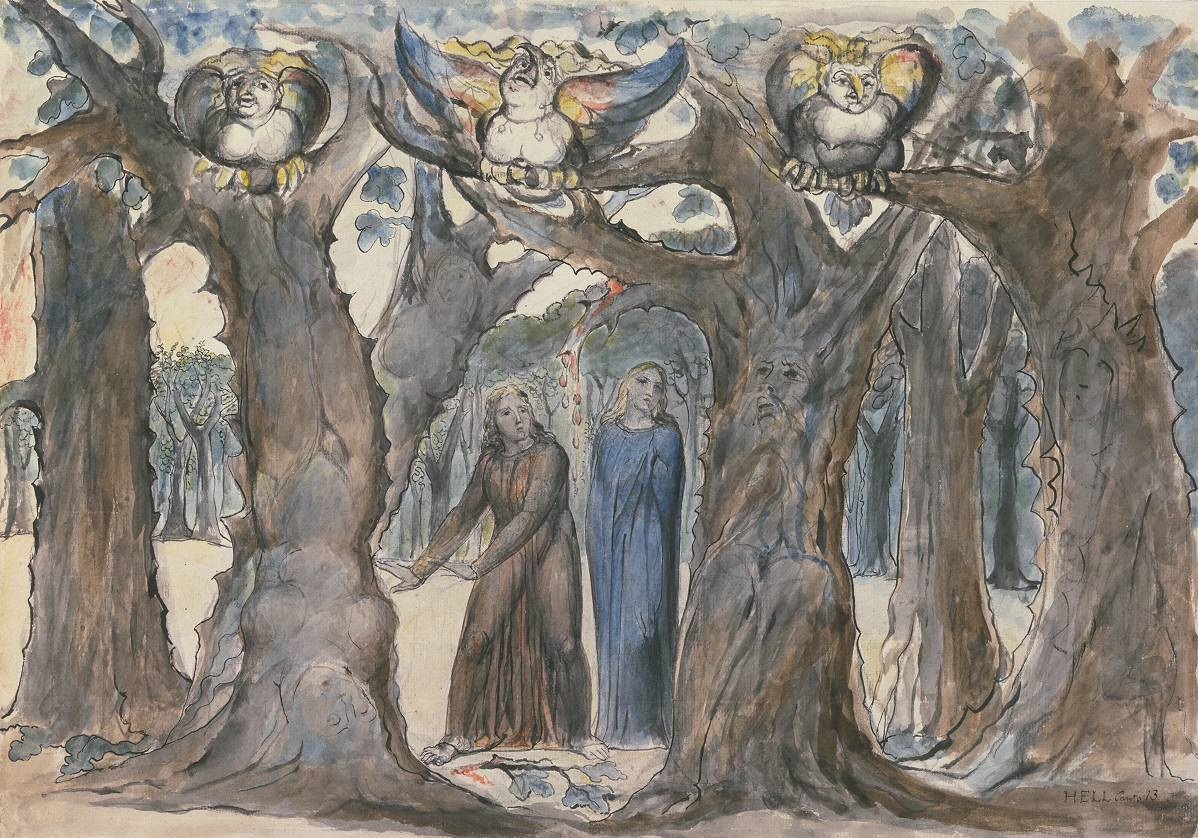
The Wood of the Self-Murderers: The Harpies and the Suicides, c. 1824–1827, William Blake, Tate (372 mm × 527 mm (14.6 in × 20.7 in))

The Wood of the Self-Murderers: The Harpies and the Suicides is a pencil, ink and watercolour on paper artwork by the English poet, painter and printmaker William Blake (1757–1827). It was completed between 1824 and 1827 and illustrates a passage from the Inferno of the Divine Comedy by Dante Alighieri (1265–1321).

It is part of a series which became the last set of watercolours Blake produced before his death in August 1827. The artwork is held in the Tate Gallery, London.

== Commission ==
Blake was commissioned in 1824 by his friend, the painter John Linnell (1792–1882), to create a series of illustrations based on Dante's poem. Blake was then in his late sixties, yet by legend drafted 100 watercolours on the subject "during a fortnight's illness in bed". Few of them were actually coloured, and only seven were gilded. He sets this work in a scene from one of the circles of Hell depicted in the Inferno (Circle VII, Ring II, Canto XIII), in which Dante and the Roman poet Virgil (70–19 BCE) travel through a forest haunted by harpies—mythological winged and malign fat-bellied death-spirits who bear features of human heads and female breasts.

== Description and meaning ==
The harpies in Dante's version feed from the leaves of oak trees, which entomb suicides. At the time Canto XIII (or The Wood of Suicides) was written, suicide was considered by the Catholic Church as at least equivalent to murder and a contravention of the Commandment "Thou shalt not kill", and many theologians believed it to be an even deeper sin than murder, as it constituted a rejection of God's gift of life. Dante alludes to this by placing suicides in the seventh circle of Hell, where the violent are punished, alongside murderers, tyrants, blasphemers, sodomites and usurpers.

Dante describes a tortured forest infested with harpies, where the act of suicide is punished by encasing the offender in a tree, thus denying eternal life and damning the soul to an eternity as a member of the restless living dead and prey to the harpies. Furthermore, the soul can only speak and grieve when its tree is broken or damaged as punishment for choosing suicide to express grief. Lastly, in another act of symbolic retribution, when each of the blessed and damned returns with his or her body from the Last Judgment, those damned for suicide will not re-inhabit their bodies but instead hang them on their branches, both because they denied them in their final act of life and as a reminder of what they denied themselves. Blake's painting shows Dante and Virgil walking through a haunted forest at a moment when Dante has torn a twig from a bleeding tree and then dropped it in shock on hearing the disembodied words, "Wherefore tear'st me thus? Is there no touch of mercy in thy breast?".

In Dante's poem, the tree contains the soul of Pietro della Vigna (1190–1249), an Italian jurist and diplomat, and chancellor and secretary to the Emperor Frederick II (1194–1250). Pietro was a learned man who rose to become a close advisor to the emperor. However, his success was envied by other members of Frederick II's court, and charges that he was wealthier than the emperor and was an agent of the pope were brought against him. Frederick threw Pietro in prison and had his eyes ripped out. In retaliation, Pietro killed himself by beating his head against the dungeon wall. He is one of four named suicides mentioned in Canto XIII, and represents the notion of a "heroic" suicide.

Describing the scene, Dante wrote:

Here the repellent harpies make their nests,
Who drove the Trojans from the Strophades
With dire announcements of the coming woe.
They have broad wings, a human neck and face,
Clawed feet and swollen, feathered bellies; they caw
Their lamentations in the eerie trees.

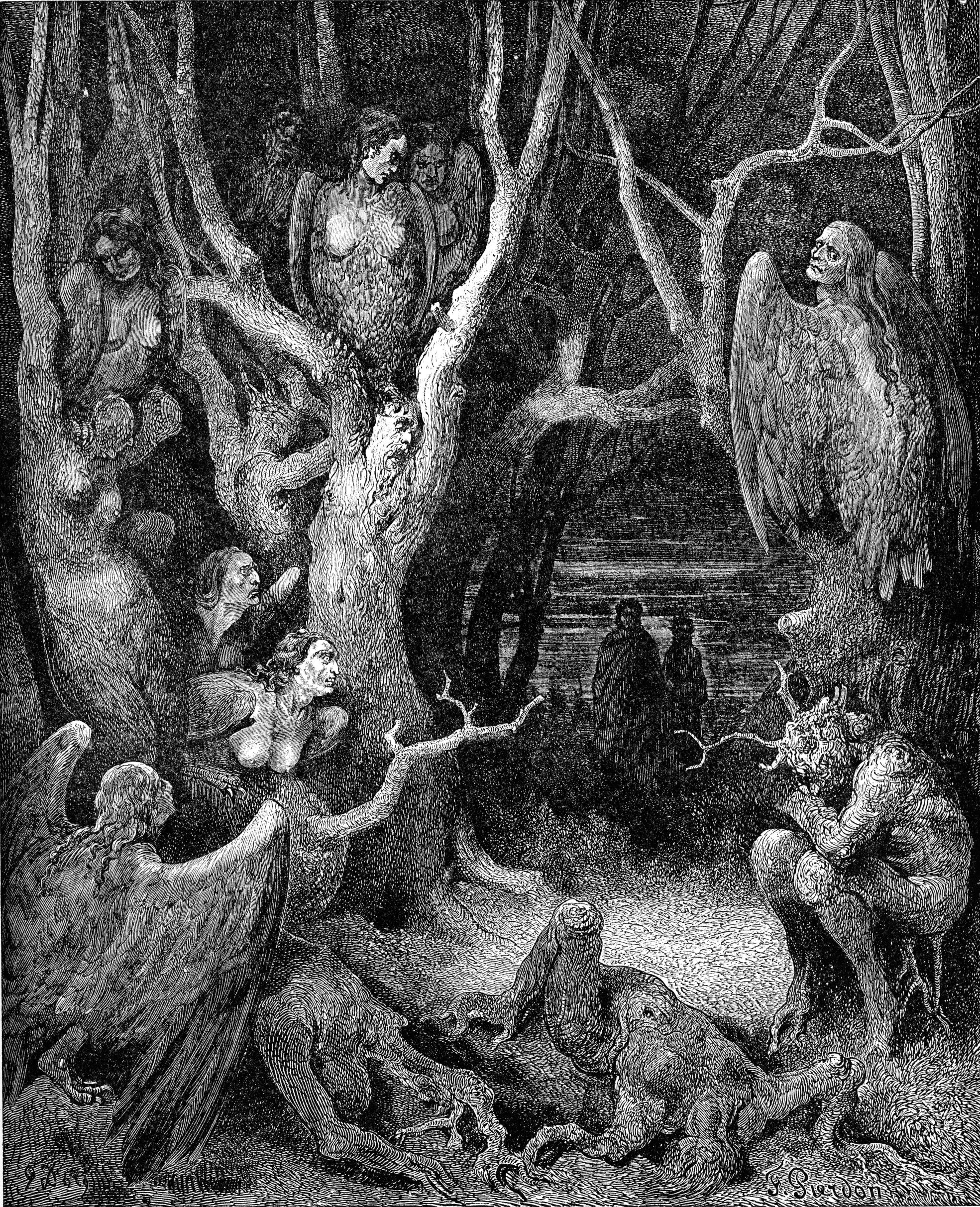
Harpies in the Forest of Suicides, an 1861 engraving by Gustave Doré, illustrates the same canto of the Inferno.

Although Pietro does not reveal his identity to the travellers in Dante's episode, he does moralise on the act of suicide, asking (as paraphrased by the historian Wallace Fowlie) if it is better to submit to chastisement and misfortune or take one's own life. In Canto XIII, Pietro says, "I am he that held both keys of Frederick's heart / To lock and to unlock / and well I knew / To turn them with so exquisite an art.

Blake shows a number of contorted human figures embedded in the oak trees in the foreground. To the right, a male figure is seated and wears a crown. A female form is hung upside-down and transformed into a tree on Dante and Virgil's left. This figure may have been inspired by Dante's reference to La Meretrice, or Envy, to whom Pietro attributed his fall. Examining Blake's use of camouflage in the work, the art historian Kathleen Lundeen observes, "The trees appear to be superimposed over the figures as if the two images in the previous illustration has been pulled together into a single focus. Through the art of camouflage, Blake gives us an image in flux, one which is in a perpetual state of transmutation. Now we see trees, now we see people."

Three large harpies perch on branches spanning the pair of travellers, and these creatures are depicted by Blake as monstrous bird–human hybrids, in the words of the art historian Kevin Hutchings, "functioning as iconographic indictments of the act of suicide and its violent negation of the divine human form".

The harpies' faces are human-like except for their pointed beaks, while their bodies are owl-shaped and equipped with claws, sharp wings and female breasts. Blake renders them in a manner faithful to Dante's description in 13:14–16: "Broad are their pennons, of the human form / Their neck and countenance, armed with talons keen / These sit and wail on the dreary mystic wood."

== Bibliography ==
- Fowlie, Wallace. A Reading of Dante's Inferno. Chicago: University of Chicago Press, 1981. ISBN 0-226-25888-2
- Hutchings, Kevin. Imagining Nature: Blake's Environmental Poetics. McGill-Queen's University Press, 2003. ISBN 0-7735-2343-X
- Lundeen, Kathleen. Knight of the Living Dead: William Blake and the Problem of Ontology. Selinsgrove: Susquehanna University Press, 2000. ISBN 1-57591-041-1
- Myrone, Martin. The Blake Book. London: Tate Gallery, 2007. ISBN 978-1-85437-727-2
- Paley, Morton D. The Traveller in the Evening: The Last Works of William Blake. Oxford: OUP Oxford, 2007. ISBN 0-19-922761-6
- Raine, Kathleen. William Blake. London: Thames and Hudson. ISBN 0-500-20107-2
