= Copenhagen Harbor by Moonlight =

Painting by Johan Christian Dahl

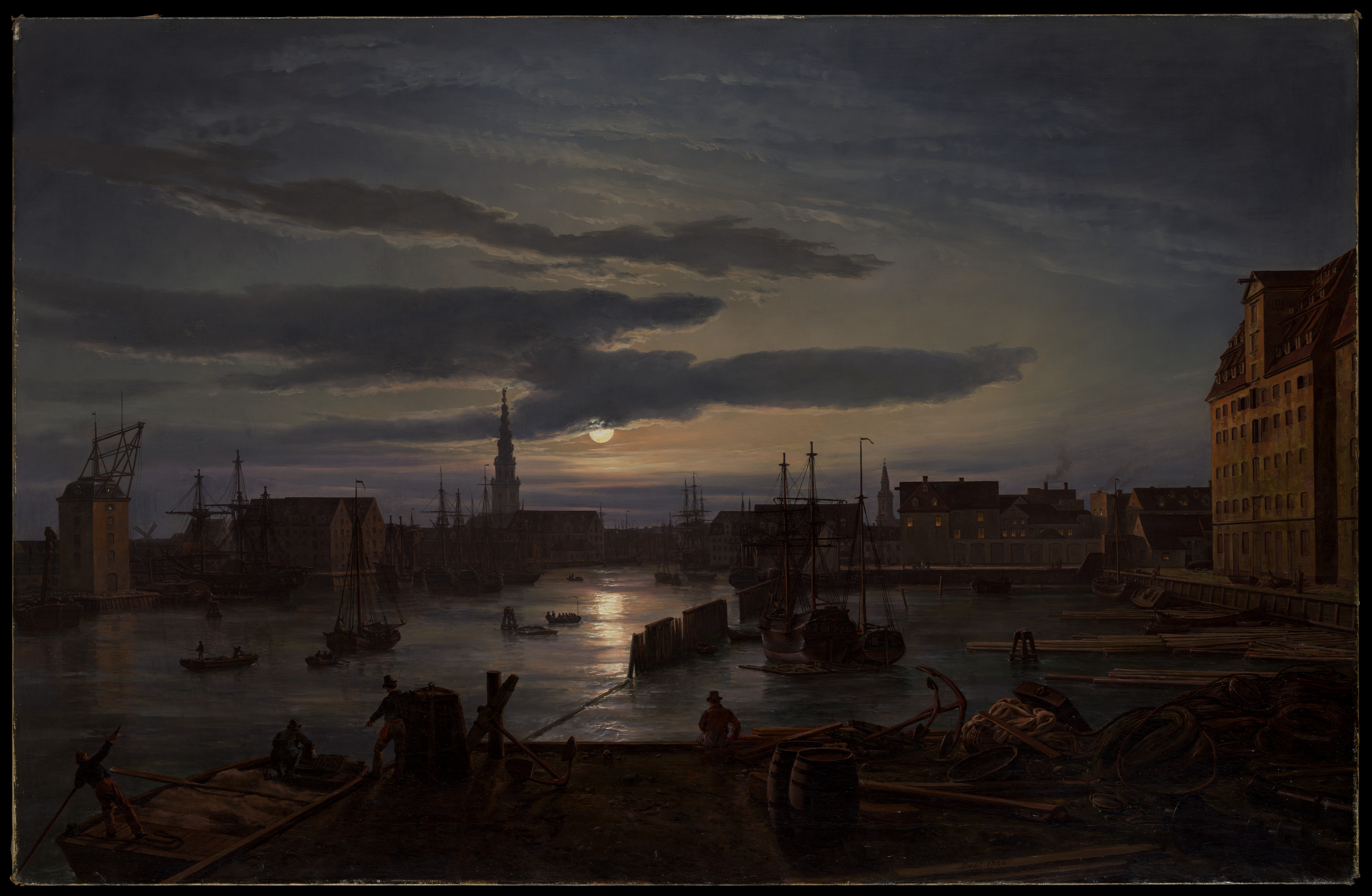
- Artist: Johan Christian Dahl
- Year: 1846
- Medium: Oil on canvas
- Dimensions: 95.9 cm × 154 cm (37.8 in × 61 in)
- Location: Metropolitan Museum of Art, New York
- Accession: 2019.167.2

Copenhagen Harbor by Moonlight is an oil on canvas painting by Norwegian artist Johan Christian Dahl, from 1846. It depicts the Copenhagen waterfront at night. The painting is the Metropolitan Museum of Art, in New York.

== Description ==
A renowned painter of landscapes, Johan Christian Dahl painted a number of harbor landscapes at night. Dahl painted Copenhagen's harbor at night at least twice, first in 1816 and later in 1846. The second painting - significantly larger than the first - depicts Larsens Plads, an important waterfront in Copenhagen.
