= Birch Tree in a Storm =

Painting by Johan Christian Dahl

- Bjerk i storm (Norwegian)
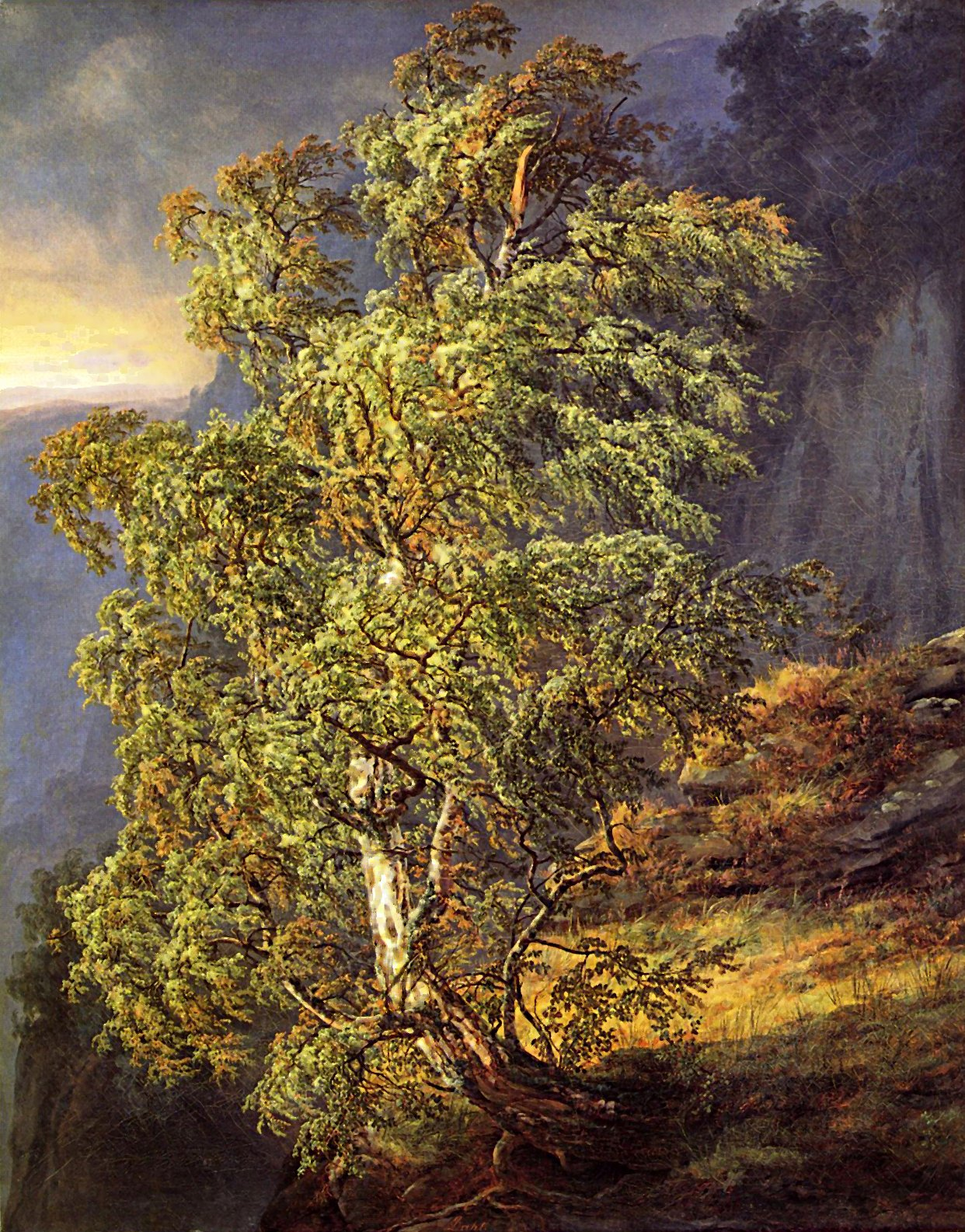
- Artist: Johan Christian Dahl
- Year: 1849
- Medium: Oil painting
- Subject: Landscape
- Dimensions: 92 cm × 72 cm (36 in × 28 in)
- Location: KODE Kunstmuseer og komponisthjem, Bergen
- Owner: KODE Kunstmuseer og komponisthjem

Birch Tree in a Storm (Norwegian: Bjerk i storm) is an 1849 oil painting by the Norwegian artist Johan Christian Dahl, measuring 92 by 72 centimetres (36 in × 28 in). It is owned by the Bergen Billedgalleri, now part of the KODE Kunstmuseer og komponisthjem, an art and culture museum based in Bergen. It shows a tree seen by the artist during a descent into Måbøgaldene in the Måbødalen valley on the way to Eidfjord.
