= Johan Christian Dahl =

Norwegian artist (1788–1857)

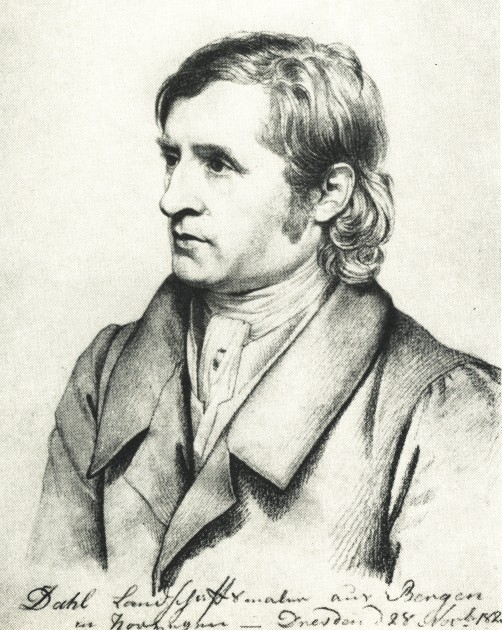
- Portrait of Johan Christian Dahl, by Carl Christian Vogel von Vogelstein, 1823
- Born: Johan Christian Claussen Dahl; 24 February 1788; Bergen, Denmark–Norway
- Died: 14 October 1857 (aged 69); Dresden, Kingdom of Saxony, German Confederation
- Known for: Norwegian landscape painting
- Movement: Norwegian romantic nationalism, German romanticism
- Awards: Order of St. Olav; Order of Vasa; Order of the Dannebrog

Johan Christian Claussen Dahl (24 February 1788 – 14 October 1857), often known as J. C. Dahl or I. C. Dahl, was a Norwegian artist who is considered the first great romantic painter in Norway, the founder of the "golden age" of Norwegian painting. He is often described as "the father of Norwegian landscape painting" and is regarded as the first Norwegian painter to reach a level of artistic accomplishment comparable to that attained by the greatest European artists of his day. He was also the first to acquire genuine fame and cultural renown abroad. As one critic has put it, "J.C. Dahl occupies a central position in Norwegian artistic life of the first half of the 19th century.

Although Dahl spent much of his life outside of Norway, his love for his country is clear in the motifs he chose for his paintings and in his extraordinary efforts on behalf of Norwegian culture generally. He was, for example, a key figure in the founding of the Norwegian National Gallery and of several other major art institutions in Norway, as well as in the preservation of Norwegian stave churches and the restoration of the Nidaros Cathedral in Trondheim and Bergenhus Fortress in Bergen.

== Life ==
=== Early life ===
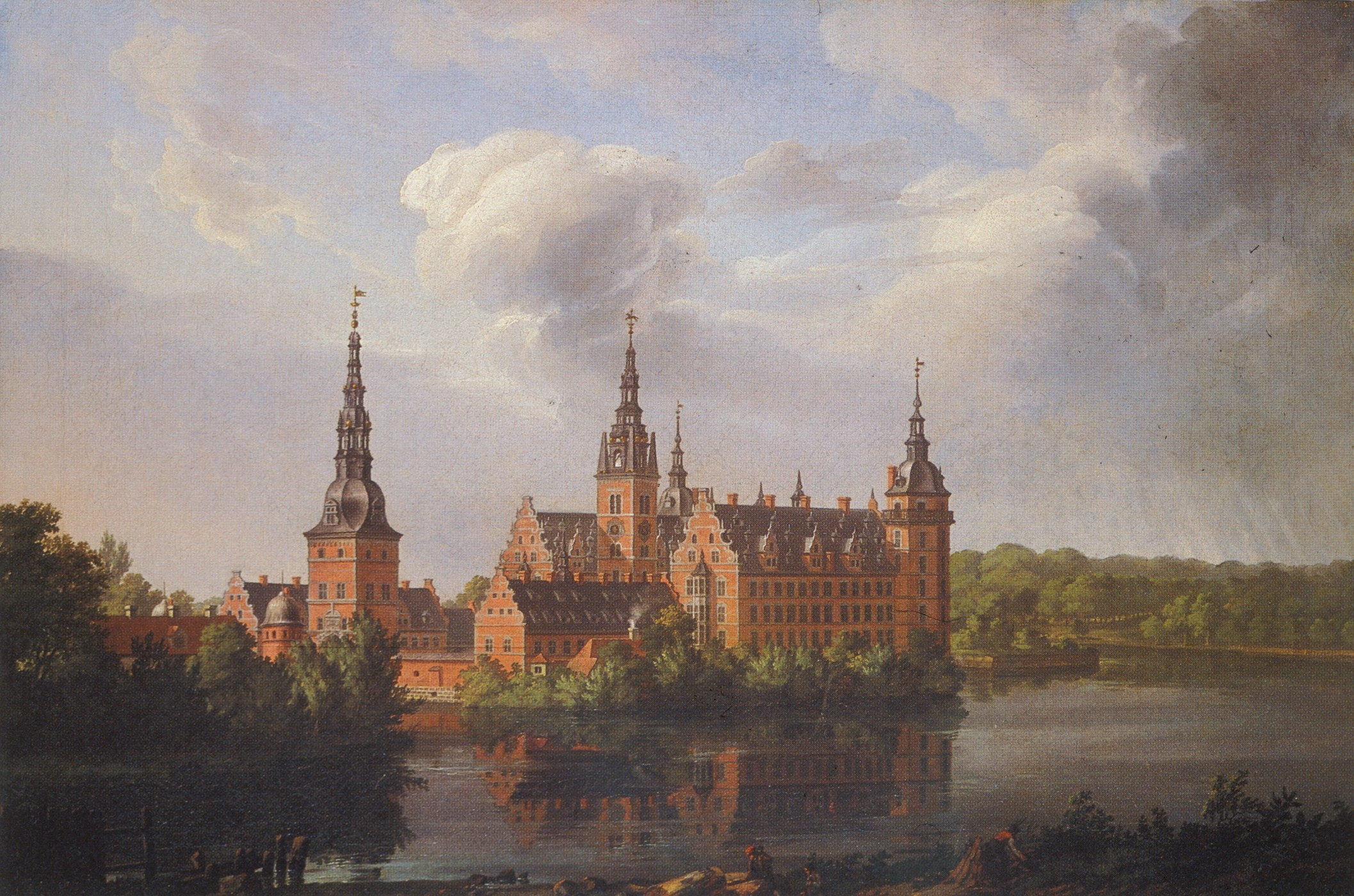
Frederiksborg Castle with an Approaching Storm, 1814

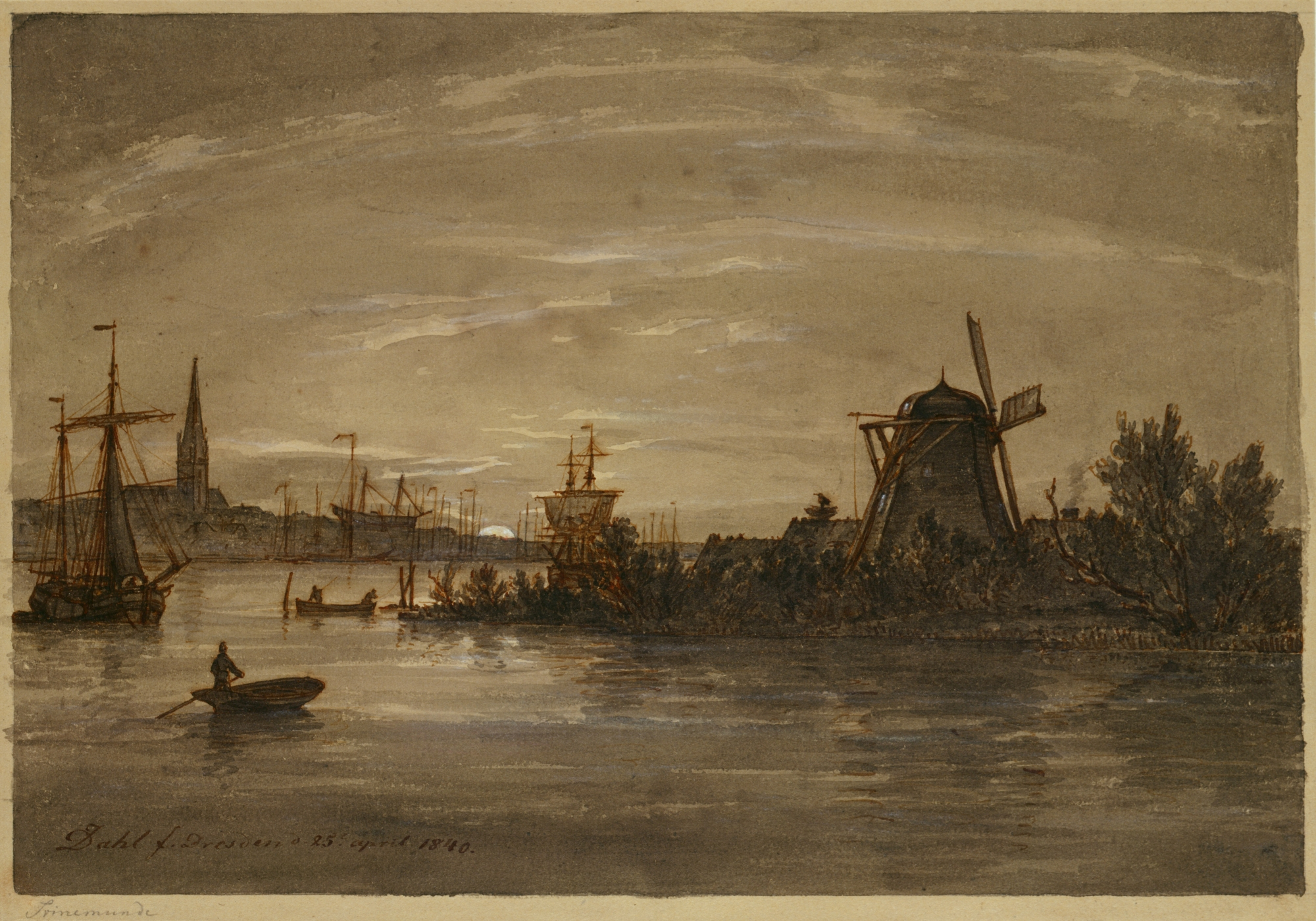
View of Świnoujście

Dahl came from a simple background – his father was a modest fisherman in Bergen, Norway – and he would later look back at his youth with bitterness. He regretted that he never had a "real teacher" in his childhood and, despite all his spectacular success, he believed that if he had been more fortunate in his birth, he would have achieved even more than he had.

=== Time at Bergen ===
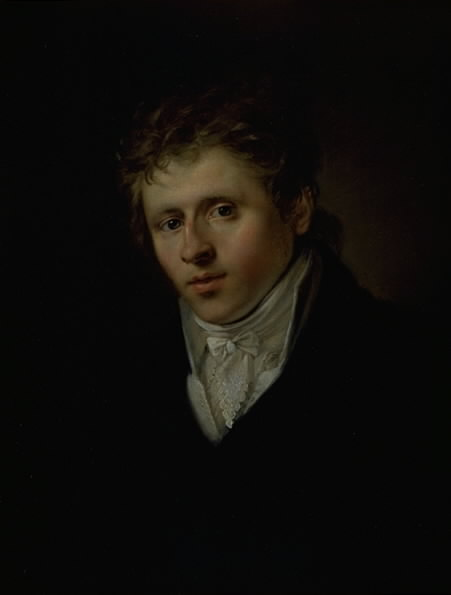
Portrait of J.C. Dahl Christian Albrecht Jensen (c 1815)

As a boy, Dahl was educated by a sympathetic mentor at the Bergen Cathedral who at first thought that this bright student would make a good priest, but then, recognizing his remarkably precocious artistic ability, arranged for him to be trained as an artist. From 1803 to 1809 Dahl studied with the painter Johan Georg Müller, whose workshop was the most important one in Bergen at the time. Still, Dahl looked back on his teacher as having kept him in ignorance in order to exploit him, putting him to work painting theatrical sets, portraits, and views of Bergen and its surroundings. Another mentor, Lyder Sagen, showed the aspiring artist books about art and awakened his interest in historical and patriotic subjects. It was also Sagen who took up a collection that made it possible for Dahl to go to Copenhagen in 1811 to complete his education at the academy there.

As important as Dahl's studies at the academy in Copenhagen were his experiences in the surrounding countryside and in the city's art collections. In 1812 he wrote to Sagen that the landscape artists he most wished to emulate were Ruisdahl and Everdingen, and for that reason he was studying "nature above all," Dahl's artistic program was, then, already in place: he would become a part of the great landscape tradition, but he would also be as faithful as possible to nature itself.

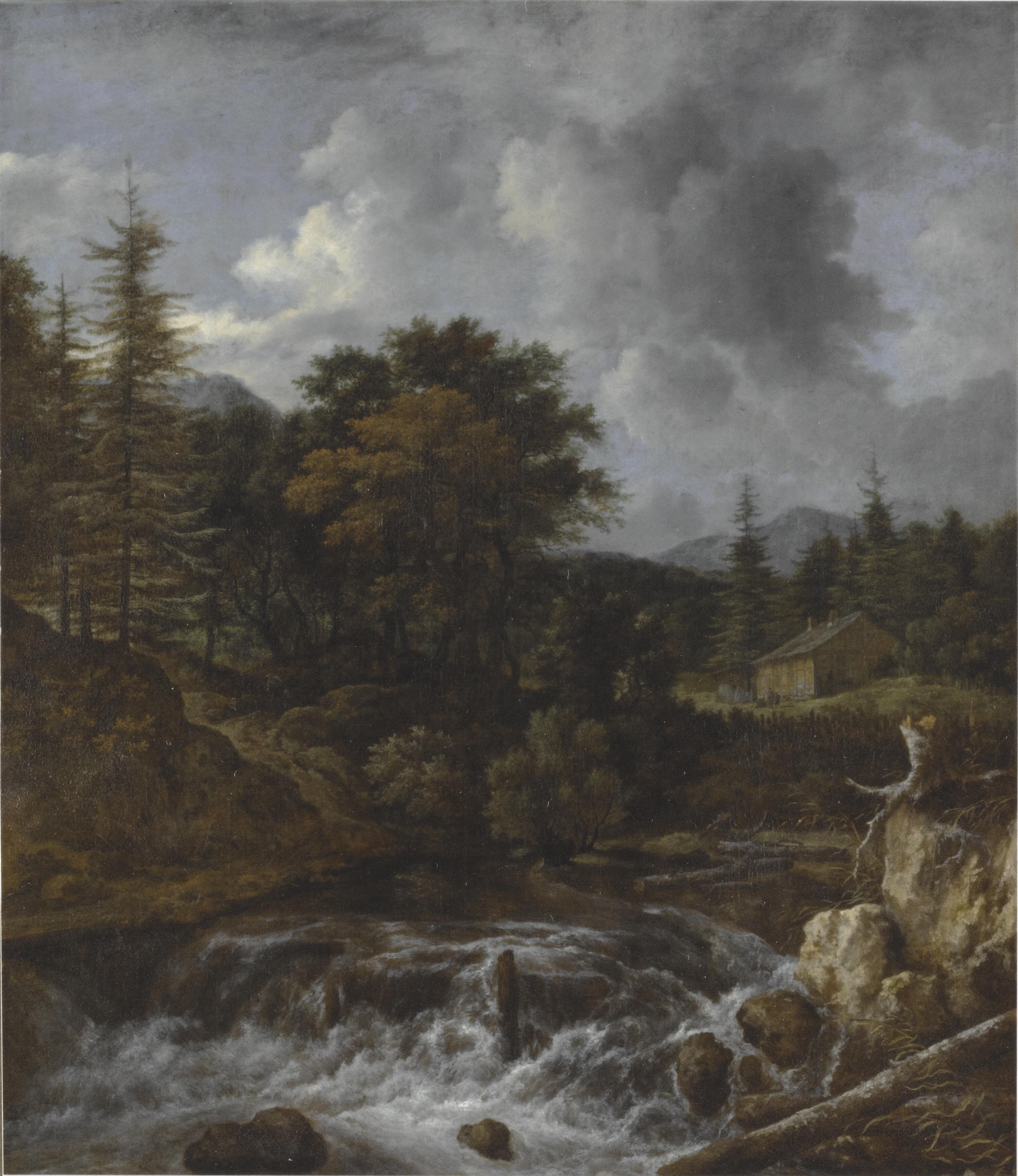
Painting by Jacob van Ruisdael in the collection of Adam Gottlob Moltke in 1812

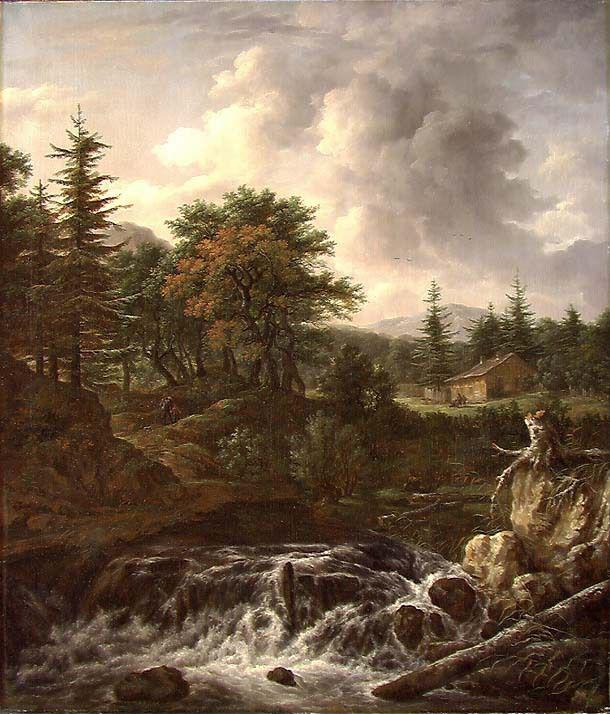
Dahl's 1812 copy of it, which impressed both Moltke and the Prince

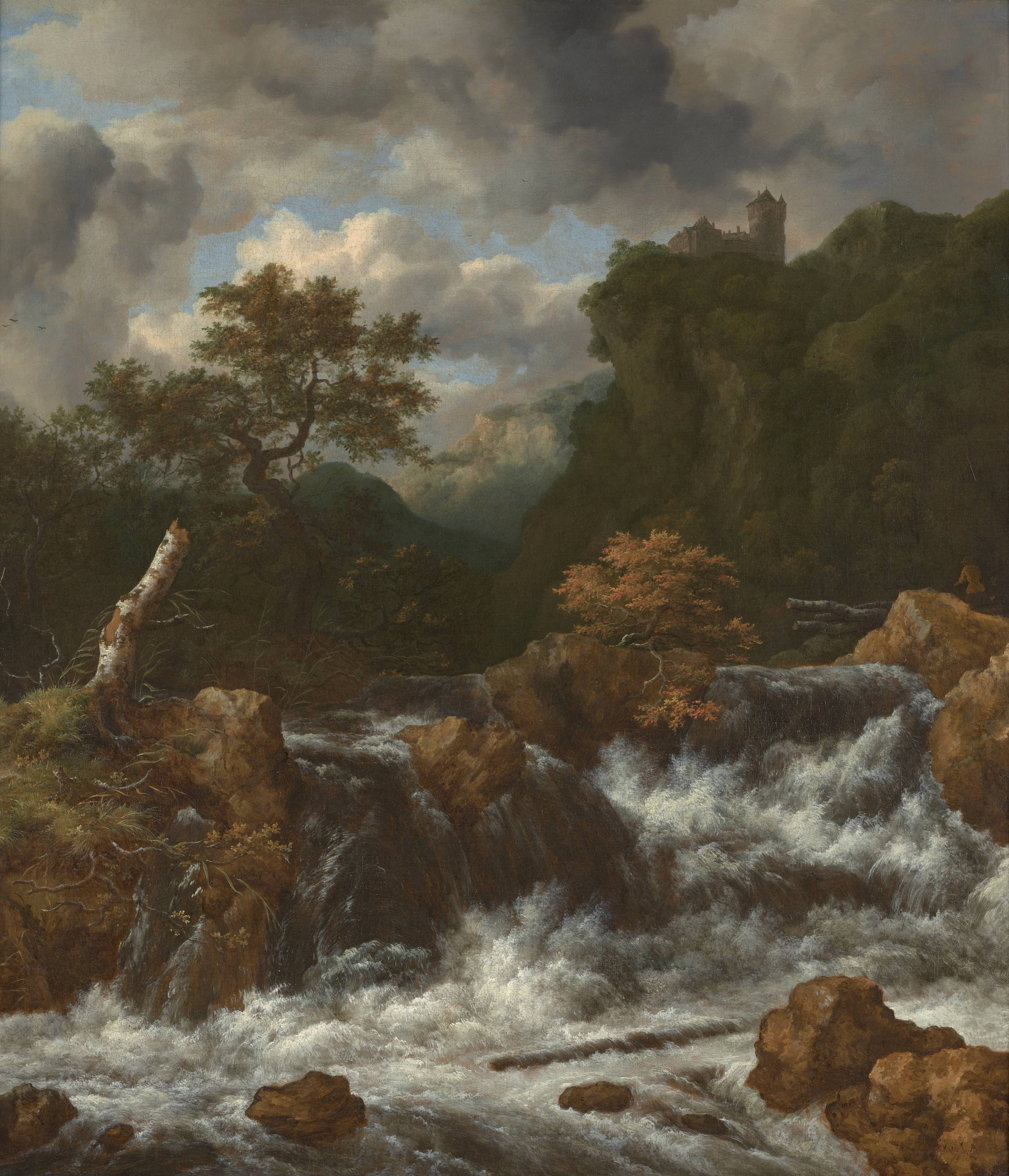
Another Ruisdael in Moltke's collection in 1812

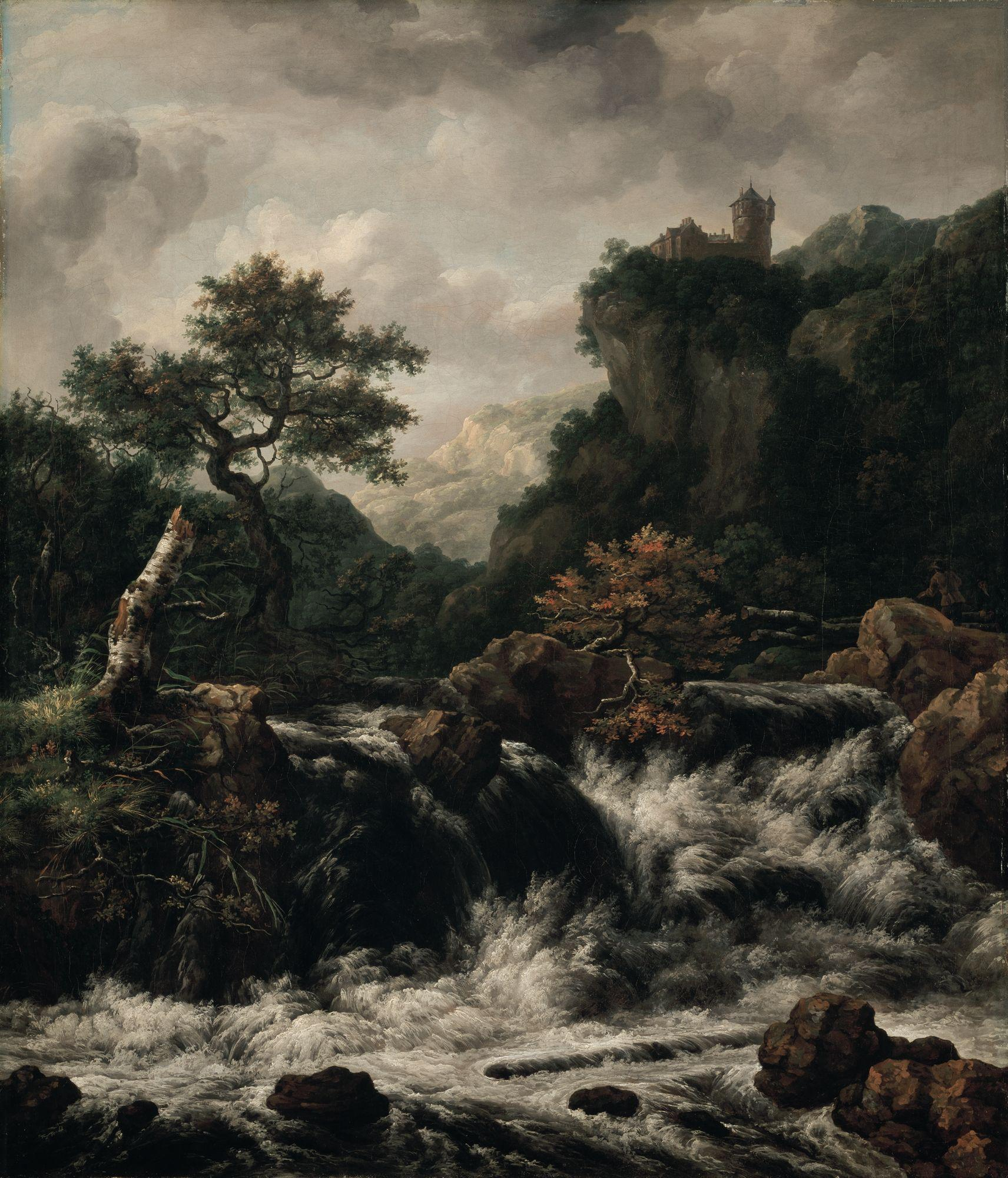
Dahl's 1813 copy of it, which again impressed both Moltke and the Prince

Dahl held that a landscape painting should not just depict a specific view, but should also say something about the land's nature and character – the greatness of its past and the life and work of its current inhabitants. The mood was often idyllic, often melancholy. When he added snow to a landscape he painted in the summer, it was not to show the light and colors of snow; it was to use snow as a symbol of death. As one critic has put it, "Unlike the radically Romantic works also appearing at the time, Dahl softens his landscape, introducing elements of genre painting by imbuing it with anecdotal materials: In the background a wisp of smoke rises from a cabin, perhaps the home of the hunter on the snow-covered field." Thanks to Sagen's recommendations and to his own personal charm, Dahl soon gained access to the leading social circles in Copenhagen.

Dahl took part in annual art exhibitions in Copenhagen beginning in 1812, but his real breakthrough came in 1815, when he exhibited no fewer than 13 paintings. Prince Christian Frederik of Denmark, who developed an early interest in Dahl's artistic genius and saw to it that his works were purchased for the royal collection, became a lifelong friend and patron of the artist.

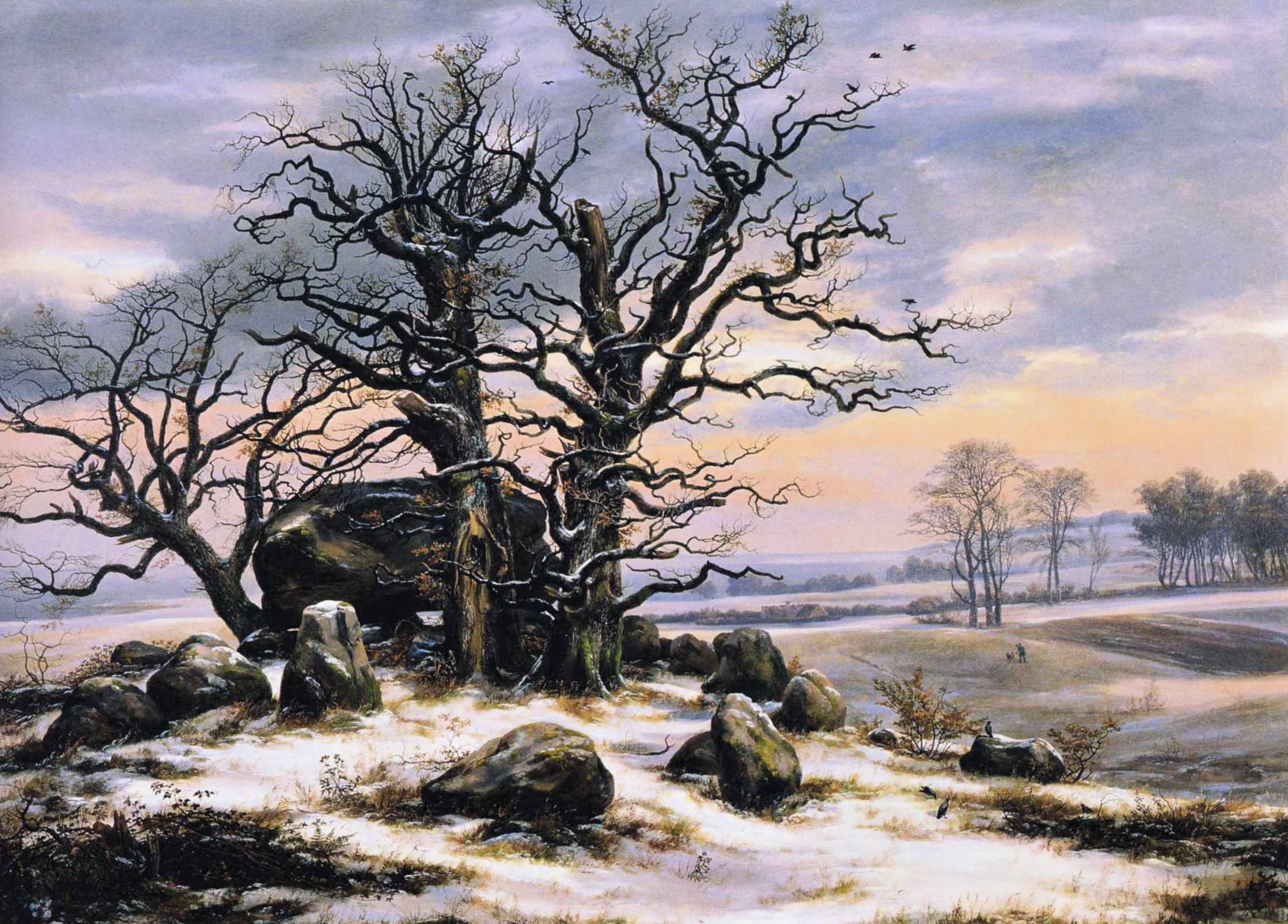
Megalithic Tomb in Winter, 1824–25, inspired by the artist's friend, Caspar David Friedrich.

In 1816 C. W. Eckersberg returned from abroad with his paintings of Roman settings; Dahl was impressed at once, and they became good friends and exchanged pictures. Dahl's 1817 painting Den Store Kro i Fredensborg marked the real beginning of his lifelong production of oil paintings depicting natural subjects.

After his success in Copenhagen, Dahl realized that he wanted to live as an independent, self-supporting artist. One challenge facing him was that the academic preference of the day was for historical paintings with moral messages. Landscapes were considered the lowest kind of art, and perhaps even not as art at all, but as a purely mechanical imitation of nature. The only landscapes that could be considered art, according to the academy, were ideal, imaginary landscapes in pastoral or heroic styles. In accordance with this reigning taste, Dahl attempted to give his Danish themes a certain atmospheric character in order to lift them up above what was considered a merely commercial level. But at the same time it was his deepest wish to provide a more faithful picture of Norwegian nature than were offered by the old-fashioned, dry paintings of Haas and Lorentzen. This desire was partly motivated by homesickness and patriotism, but it was also suited to the public taste of the day for "picturesque" works.

=== Abroad in Dresden ===
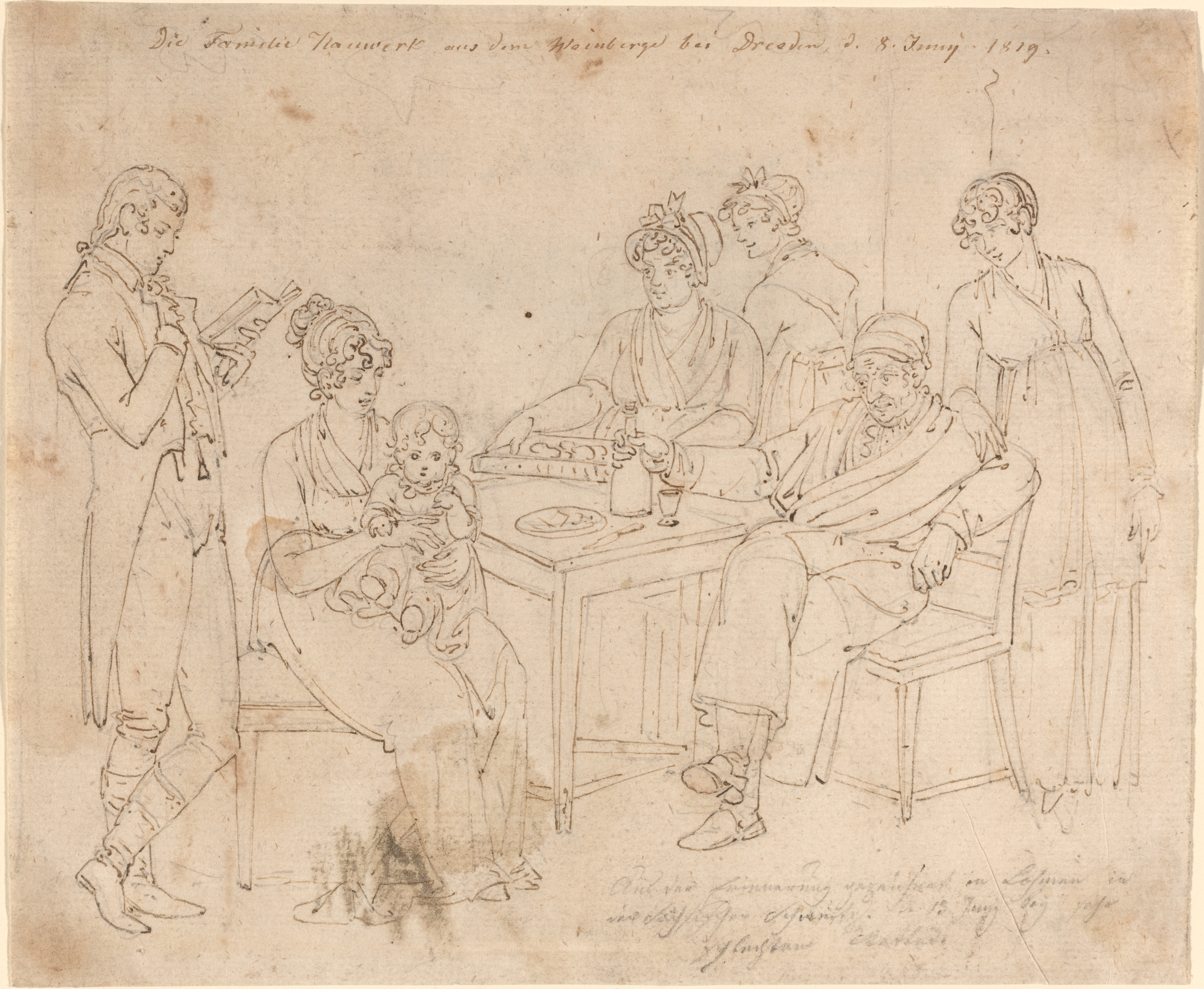
The Nauwerk Family, 1819, National Gallery of Art. Drawn during the artist's time in Dresden.

Dahl traveled to Dresden in September 1818. He arrived with introductions to the city's leading citizens and to major artists such as Caspar David Friedrich, who helped him establish himself there and became his close friend. One critic has written: "Friedrich's still, meticulously executed landscapes - products of an art informed by his strict Protestant upbringing and a seeking for the divine in nature - were justifiably famous by the time he and Dahl became acquainted. We are able to see his Two Men Contemplating the Moon (1819), which ranks among his greatest works, and features two "Rückenfiguren," or figures seen from behind, solemnly and companionably gazing at a young sickle moon from the edge of an old forest. 'Greifswald in Moonlight' (1816–17) depicts the artist's birthplace in Pomerania, on the Baltic coast: bathed in an even, gauzy moonlight, the ancient university town assumes an almost ethereal appearance."

Friedrich was fourteen years Dahl's elder and an established artist, but the two found in each other a shared love for nature and a shared enthusiasm for a way of depicting nature that was based on the study of nature itself rather than on the academic cliches that they both profoundly despised. One writer has put it this way: "A warm and sociable character, he soon met and became friendly with the more introverted and reclusive Friedrich, recording how they once walked together in the park of the Grösser Garten among 'many lovely trees of different kinds, and the moon looked beautiful behind the dark fir trees.'"

Together with Friedrich and Carl Gustav Carus, Dahl would become one of the Dresden painters of the period who exerted a decisive influence on German Romantic painting.

In Dresden, as in Copenhagen, Dahl traveled around the area to draw subjects that could be of use to him in larger works that would be painted later in his atelier. He wrote to Prince Christian Frederik in 1818 that "most of all I am representing nature in all its freedom and wildness." Dahl found enough material in the Dresden area to supply motifs for his paintings, but he continued to paint imaginary landscapes with forests, mountains, and waterfalls. One such painting, completed in 1819, entitled Norsk fjellandskap med elv (Mountainous Norwegian landscape with river"), garnered great attention among younger artists who considered the striking natural quality of the painting a breath of fresh air on Dresden's stagnant art scene. Another monumental waterfall painting, completed the next year, was lavished with praise by the critic for Kunstblatt who said that Dahl was greater than Jacob van Ruisdael. Dahl was accepted into the Dresden academy in 1820.

=== Abroad in Italy ===
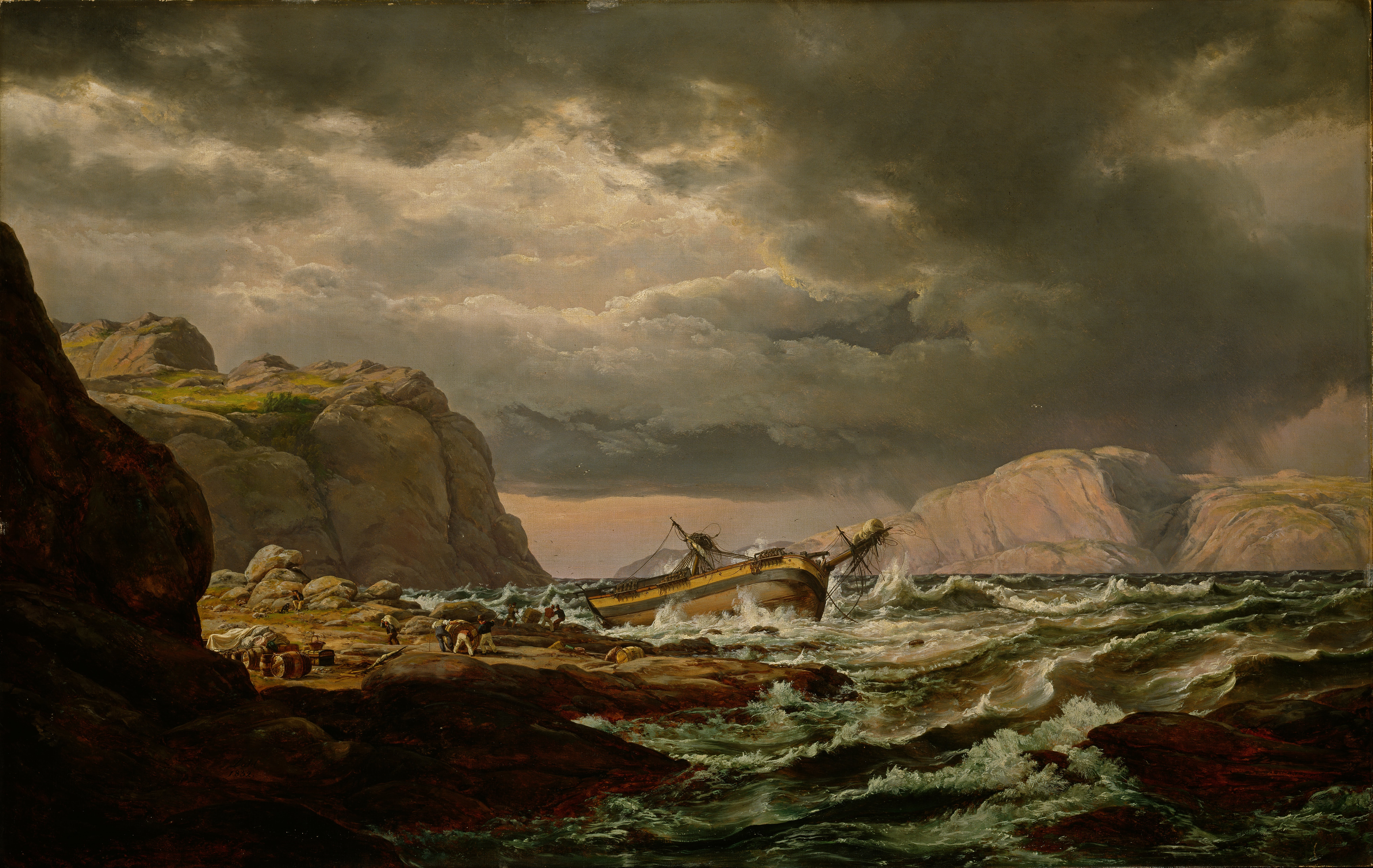
Shipwreck on the Coast of Norway, 1832

Prince Christian Frederik wrote to Dahl in 1820 from Italy and invited him to join him at the Gulf of Naples. Dahl was at the time courting a young woman named Emilie von Bloch, but felt he should take the prince up on his offer, so he married Emilie quickly and traveled to Italy the next day. He ended up spending 10 months in Italy. Though he missed his bride, the sojourn was a decisive factor in his artistic development. It was in Italy, with its strong southern light, that Dahl's art truly flowered. It forced him to see nature plain, without the mediation of the old masters' renderings of light and color.

Dahl went to Rome in February 1821. He spent a great deal of time visiting museums, meeting other artists, and painting pictures to sell. In addition to painting sights in Rome and pictures of the Gulf of Naples, he painted landscapes inspired by the mountains of Norway. Dahl said that not until he was in Rome did he truly appreciate Norwegian nature. In June 1821 Dahl returned north to Emilie and a quiet life of family and painting.

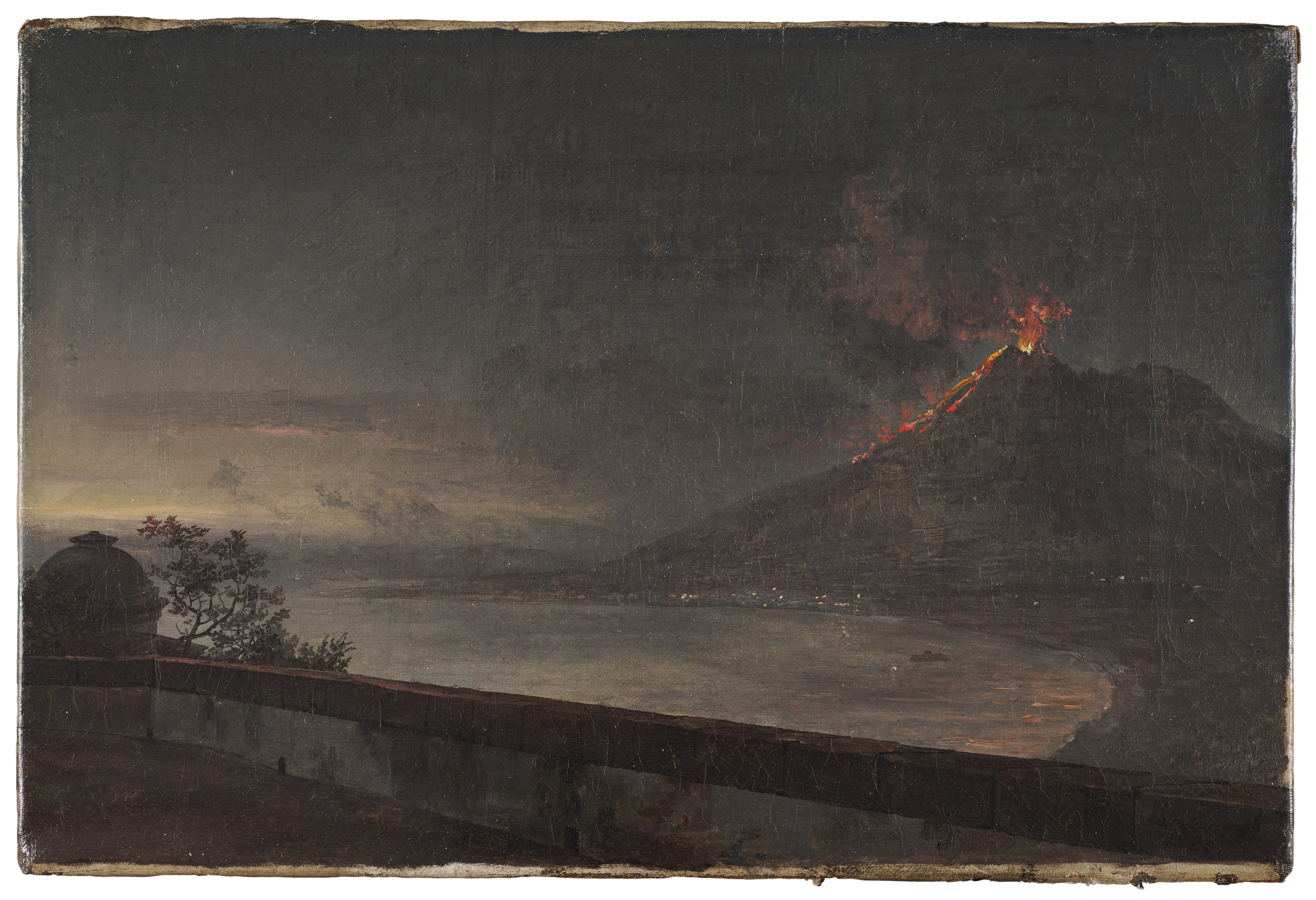
Johan Christian Dahl, View towards Vesuvio from Quisisana, 1820, Nationalmuseum, Stockholm

Dahl quickly became a member of Dresden's leading circles of poets, artists, and scientists, among them the archeologist C. A. Böttiger, publisher of Artistisches Notizenblatt, who ran a major article on Dahl in 1822.

=== Mentorship ===
View from Stalheim, 1842

As a member of the academy, Dahl always dedicated his time to young artists who sought him out. In 1824 he and Friedrich were named "extraordinary professors" who had no chair but who received a regular salary. In 1823 Dahl moved in with Friedrich, so that many of his students, such as Knud Baade, Peder Balke, and Thomas Fearnley, were equally influenced by both artists. "Well before their meeting," writes one critic, "Dahl had also painted a number of 'moonlights' and, travelling in Europe, he was in the Bay of Naples in 1821 when Mount Vesuvius was active. Here he painted 'Boats on the Beach Near Naples', where fishing crafts lie at anchor in the calm, shimmering waters with the twin peaks of the mountain smoking and flaming behind. Predictably, after his close association with Friedrich began—the two families shared a house in Dresden from 1823—he was considerably influenced by him, but his own more spontaneous and painterly style soon prevailed. Clients sometimes commissioned pictures from them both, a tranquil coastal scene by Friedrich to pair with a more stormy subject from Dahl."

Dahl never formed a "school" around himself, but rather preferred for his students to cultivate their own styles; it was against his principles and his respect for artistic freedom to try to inhibit his students' individuality. It was this impulse toward individuality that later caused him to turn down an offer of a permanent chair at the academy – he didn't want to feel compelled to show up for class when he was busy working on a painting.

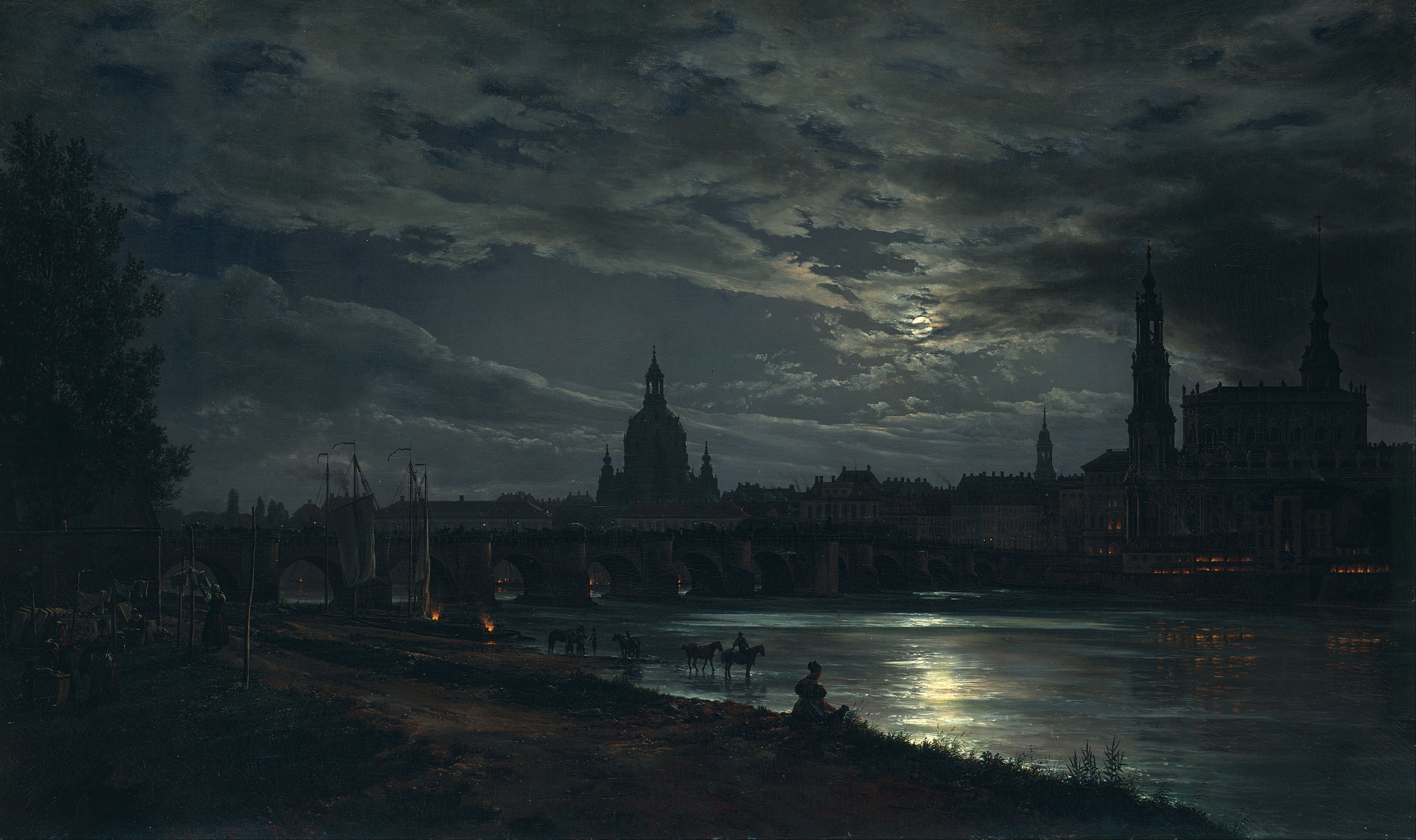
View of Dresden by Moonlight, 1839

Dahl continued his studies of nature in the area around Dresden when he had the time, or on longer trips which provided him with themes for his paintings. But most often he painted the view of the Elbe outside his windows in various kinds of light. Like John Constable, Dahl felt that the sky was an important part of a landscape painting, and he never grew tired of watching the clouds move over the flat plain. One critic has compared two paintings of Friedrich and Dahl: "In...Dahl's 'Mother and Child by the Sea', there are echoes of Friedrich's 'Woman by the Sea' (1818). Whereas in Friedrich's work a woman dressed for the windy weather sits idly watching five fishing boats sailing past, in Dahl's picture, there seems to be a more personal note, with echoes of his own upbringing in a seafaring community, as the mother and small child eagerly await the return of the little ship from the sea." The same critic has written about one of his paintings of Dresden: "Dahl also commemorated the magnificent Baroque buildings of his adopted city, and a version of his View of Dresden by Moonlight (1838) has travelled from the National Museum of Art, Architecture, and Design in Oslo. This small picture, measuring only 18.5 cm × 34.5 cm (7 1/4 in × 13 1/2 in), shows the dome of the Frauenkirche and the tower of the Hofkirche dominating the skyline; silvers and deep blue combine to give it a wonderful jewel-like effect, together with a certain elegiac quality, perhaps indicative of the artist's awareness that his long friendship with Friedrich was nearing an end."

=== Return home ===
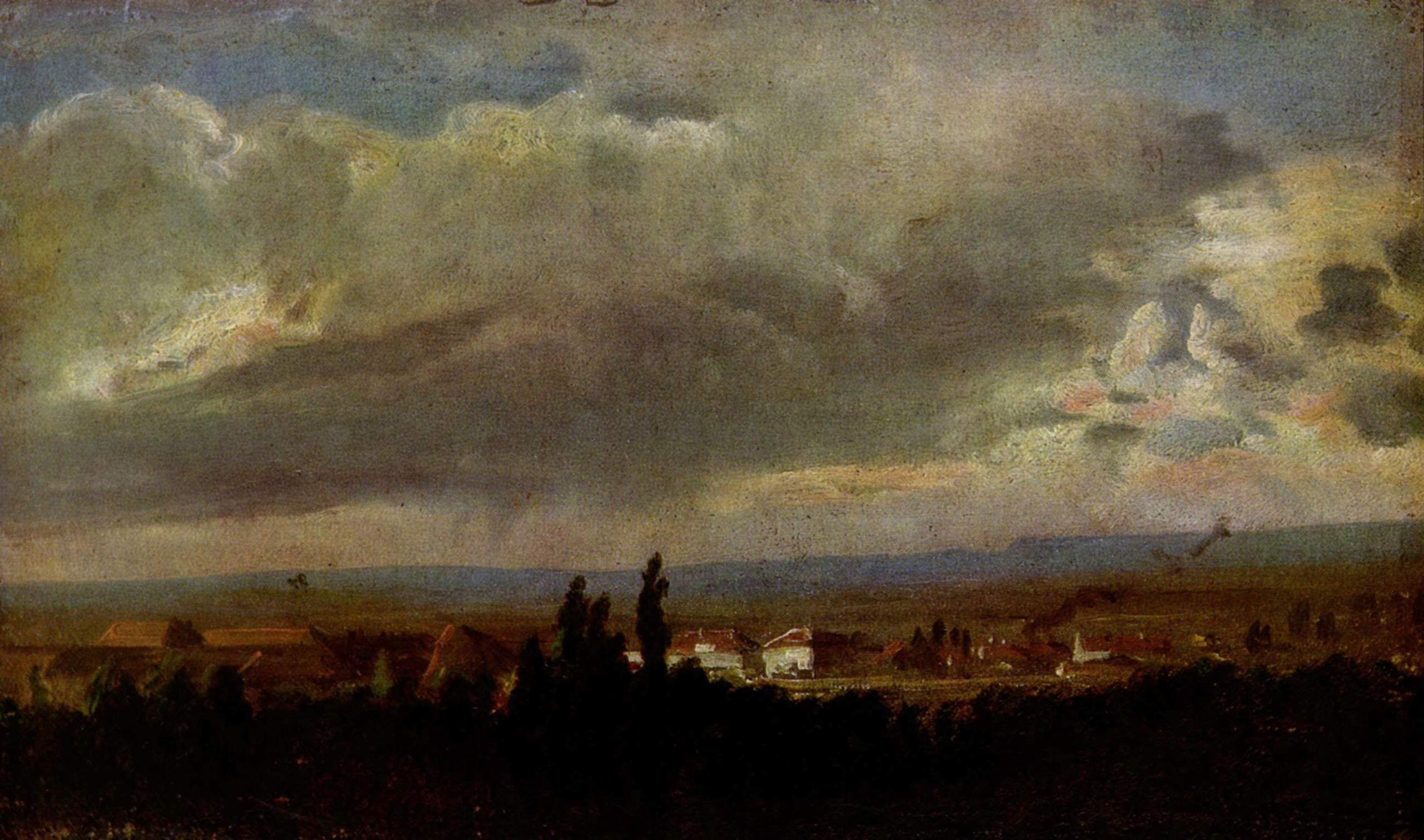
Gewitterstimmung bei Dresden, 1830

As Dahl wrote in 1828 to the director of the Dresden academy, he found the area around Dresden useful for nature studies, but the "real thing" was always missing; that was something he could only find in his mountainous homeland. He viewed himself as a "more Nordic painter" with a "love for seacoasts, mountains, waterfalls, sailboats, and pictures of the sea in daylight and moonlight." He longed to return to Norway, but not until 1826 was he able to make a journey home.

He made subsequent trips to Norway in 1834, 1839, 1844, and 1850, mostly exploring and painting the mountains, leading to the monumental works Fortundalen (1836) and Stalheim (1842). During his visits to Norway he received "an enthusiastic welcome as a painter of renown."

A critic notes Dahl's late stylistic changes: "In his late Fjord at Sunset (1850), based on studies made earlier, free and adventurous brush strokes represent the cloud-swept sky and broken surface of the water. Here he has moved far away from the purity and intensity of Friedrich's oeuvre."

Later life

In 1827 Emilie Dahl died in childbirth while having their fourth child, and two years later two of the older children died of scarlet fever. In January 1830, Dahl married his student Amalie von Bassewitz, but she, too, died in childbirth in December of that same year. Dahl was crushed, and many months passed before he was able to paint again. Some years later this youngest child also died, leaving Dahl with two surviving children, Siegwald and Caroline, who married the Norwegian minister Anders Sandøe Ørsted Bull 1848.

Dahl's trip to Norway in 1850 would be his last. He was aging and weak, but continued to paint landscapes in the mountains. This last journey to his homeland resulted in several magnificent works, including Måbødalen, Fra Stugunøset, and Hjelle i Valdres.

Dahl was among the founding fathers of the National Gallery of Norway (Norwegian: Nasjonalgalleriet), now the National Museum of Art, Architecture, and Design, and donated his own art collection to the institution.

=== Death ===
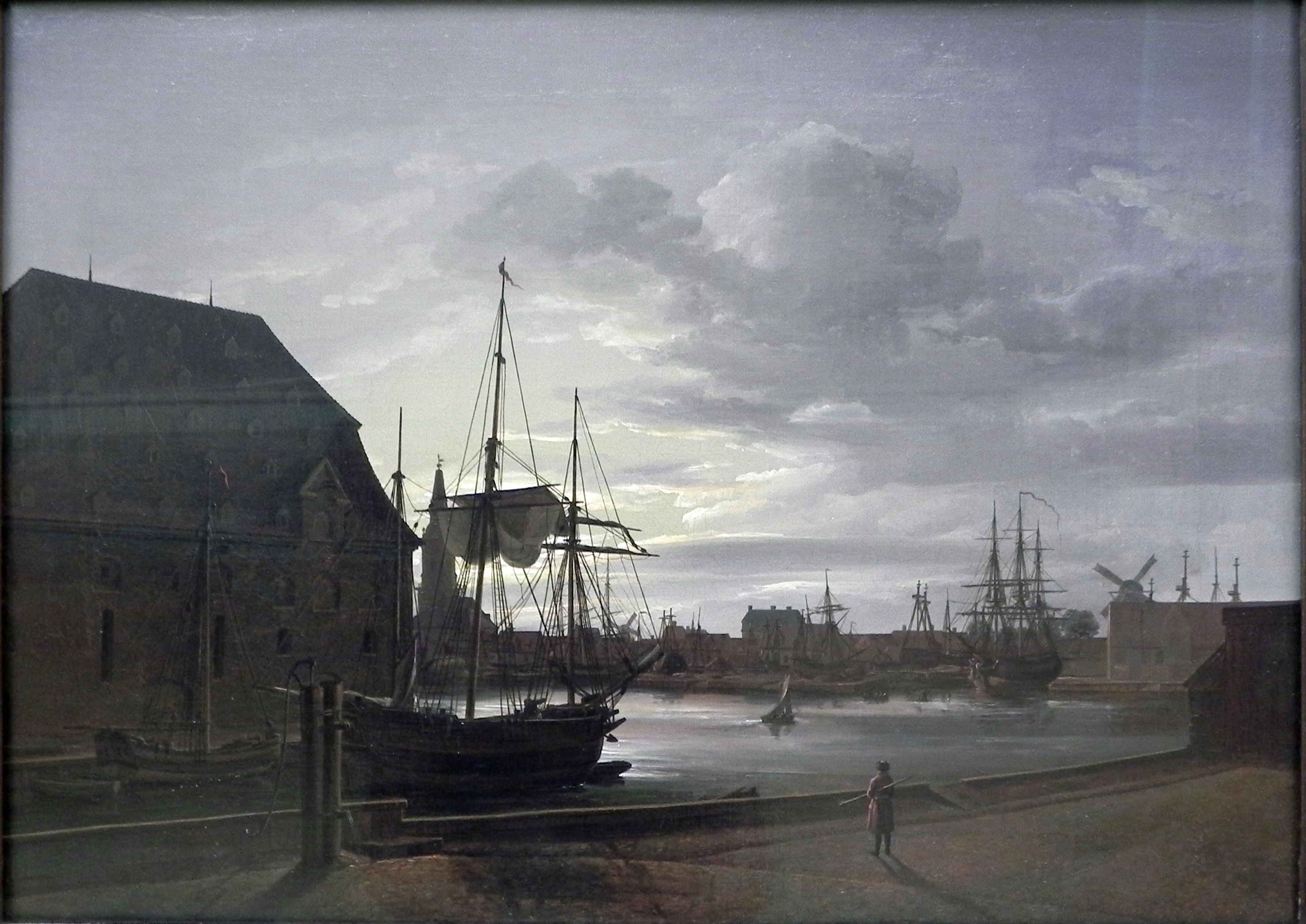
Johan Christian Dahl Frederiksholms Canal

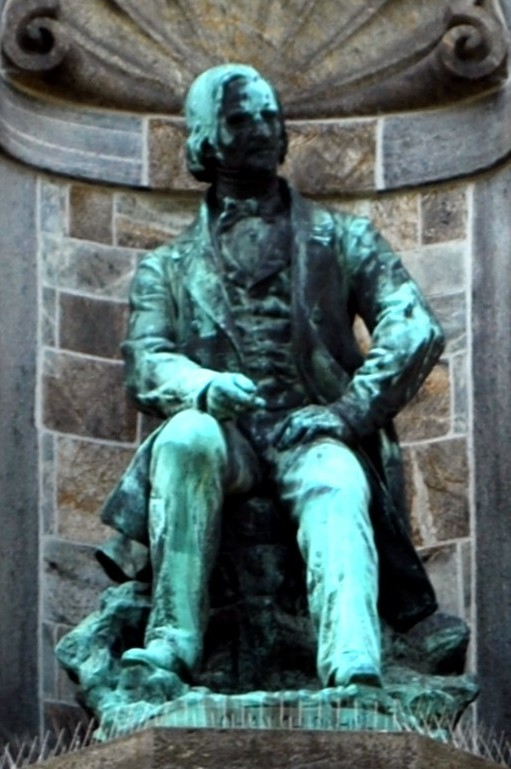
Statue of J. C. Dahl by Ambrosia Tønnesen (1902)

Dahl died after a brief illness and was buried on 17 October 1857 in Dresden. In 1902, a statue of Dahl by Norwegian sculptor Ambrosia Tønnesen (1859–1948) was erected on the facade of the Permanenten in Bergen. In 1934, his remains were brought back to Norway and buried in the cemetery of St. Jacob's Church (Sankt Jakob kirke) in Bergen.

J.C. Dahl occupies a central position in Norwegian artistic life of the first half of the 19th century. His Romantic yet naturalistic interpretations of Norwegian scenery were greatly admired in Norway as well as on the European continent, particularly in Denmark and Germany.

== Honors ==
Dahl had both the Order of Vasa and Order of St. Olav bestowed on him by the King of Sweden and Norway. He also received the Order of Dannebrog from Denmark. The three honors testify to his extraordinary cultural impact throughout Scandinavia.

== Notable works ==
Many of his works may be seen in Dresden, notably a large picture titled Norway and Storm at Sea. The Bergen Kunstmuseum in Bergen, Norway, contains several of his more prominent works, including Måbødalen (1851), Fra Stedje i Sogn (1836), Hjelle i Valdres (1850), Lysekloster (1827), Stedje i Sogn (1836) and Bjerk i storm (1849).

The National Museum of Art, Architecture and Design - The National Gallery, Oslo has a large collection of his works, including Vinter ved Sognefjorden (1827), Castellammare (1828), Skibbrudd ved den norske kyst (1832), Hellefoss (1838), Fra Stalheim (1842), Fra Fortundalen (1842) and Stugunøset på Filefjell (1851). Significant works (with their titles in Norwegian) include the following:

- Frederiksborg Castle (1817)
- Vesuv i utbrudd (1826)
- Vinter ved Sognefjorden (1827)
- Castellammare (1828)
- Skibbrudd ved den norske kyst (1832)
- Fra Stedje i Sogn (1836)
- Hellefoss (1838)
- Stalheim (1842)
- Fra Fortundalen (1842)
- Bjerk i storm (1849)
- Hjelle i Valdres (1850)
- Stugunøset på Filefjell (1851)
- Måbødalen (1851)

== Gallery ==
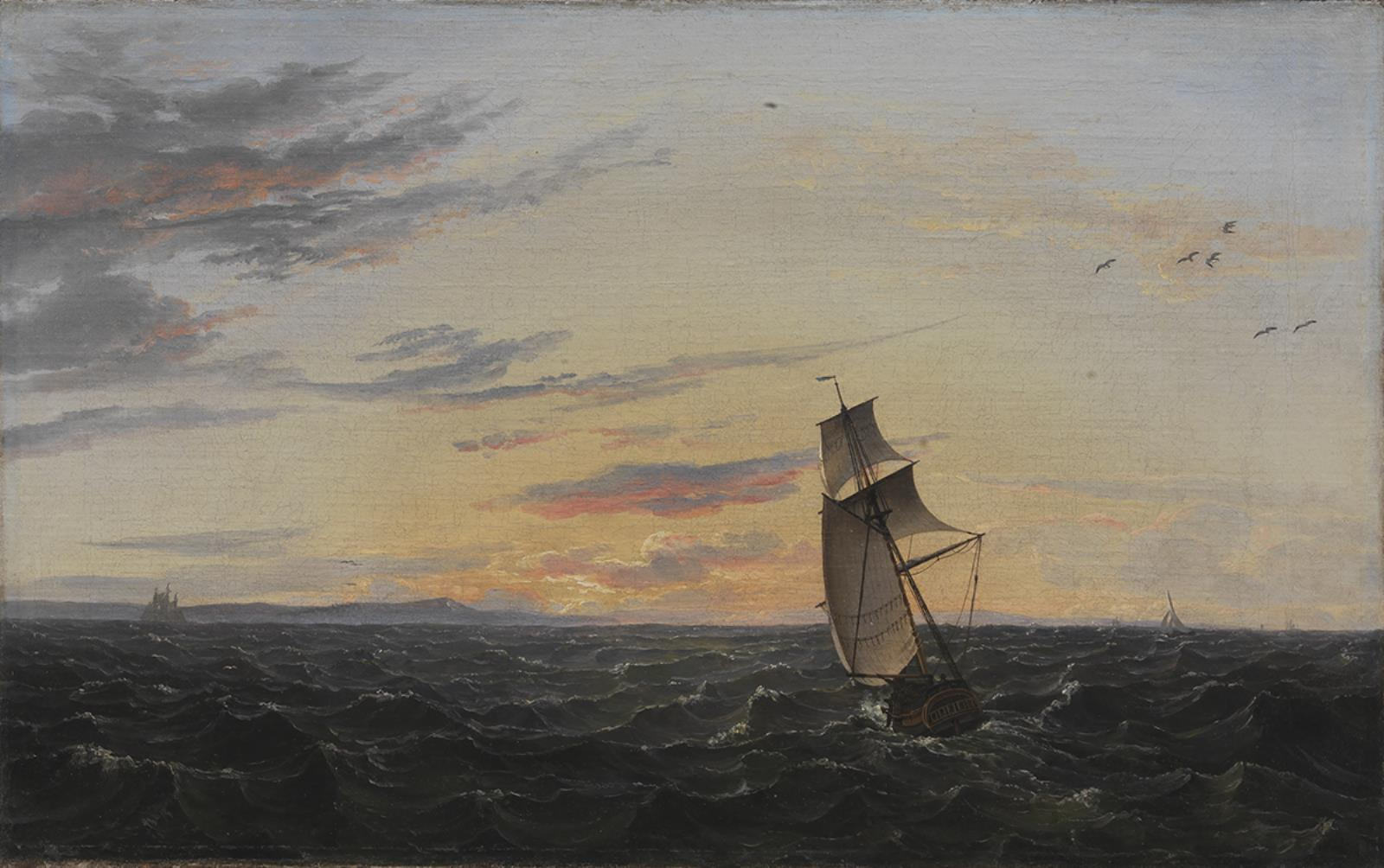
A Seascape. The Coast of the Island of Rügen in Evening Light (1818)

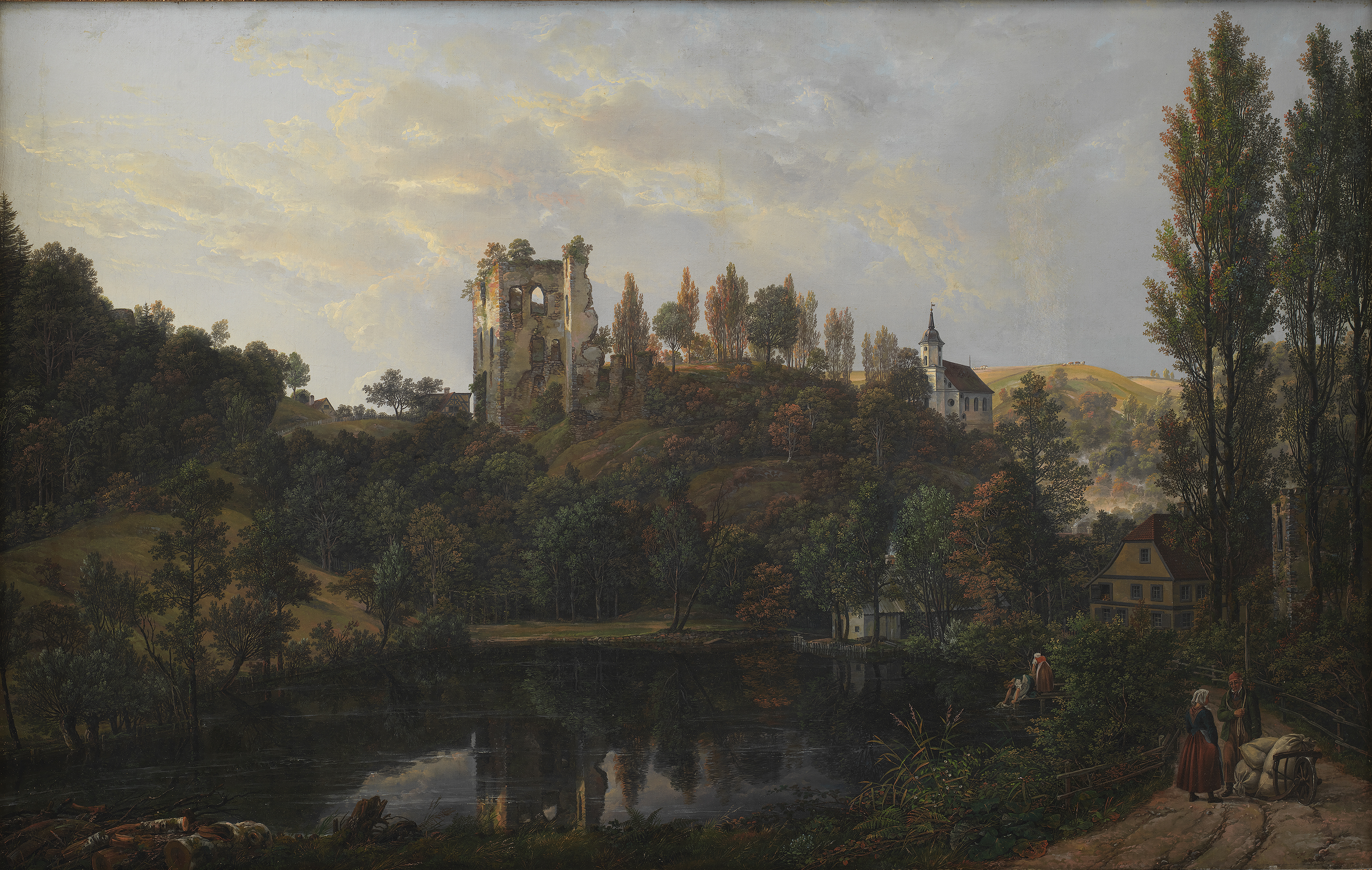
The Castle Ruin at Tharandt (1819)

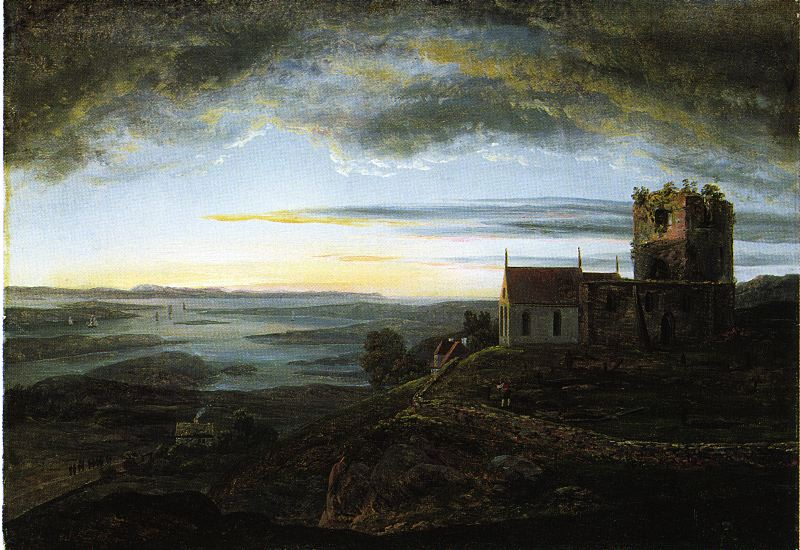
Avaldsnes Church (1820)

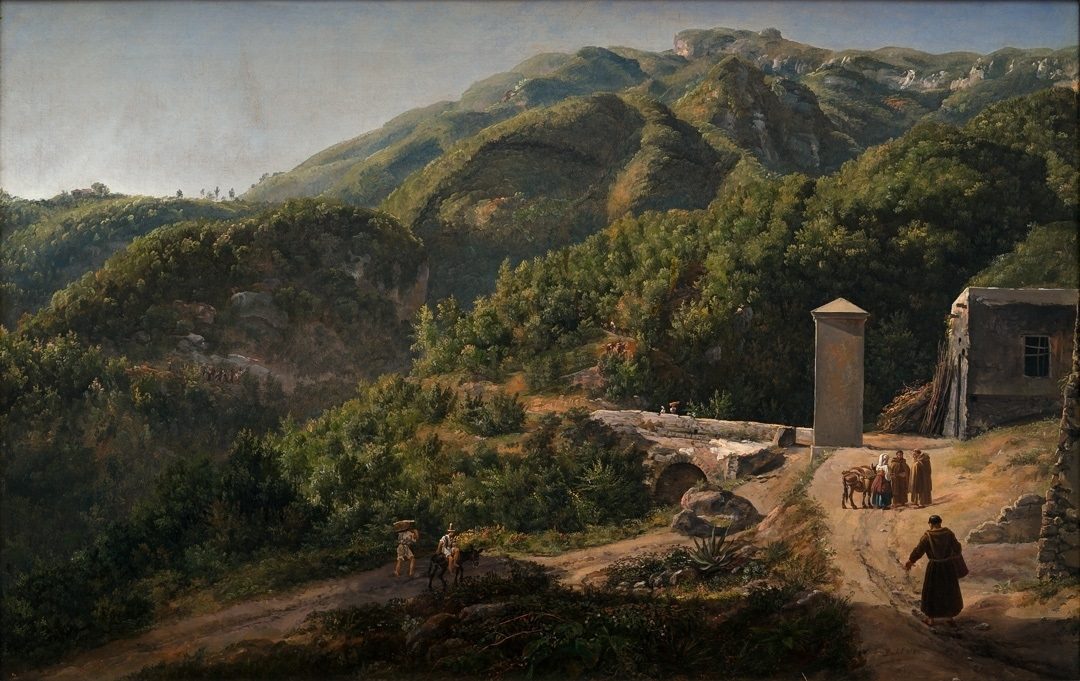
Hills Near Quisisana in Morning Light (1820)

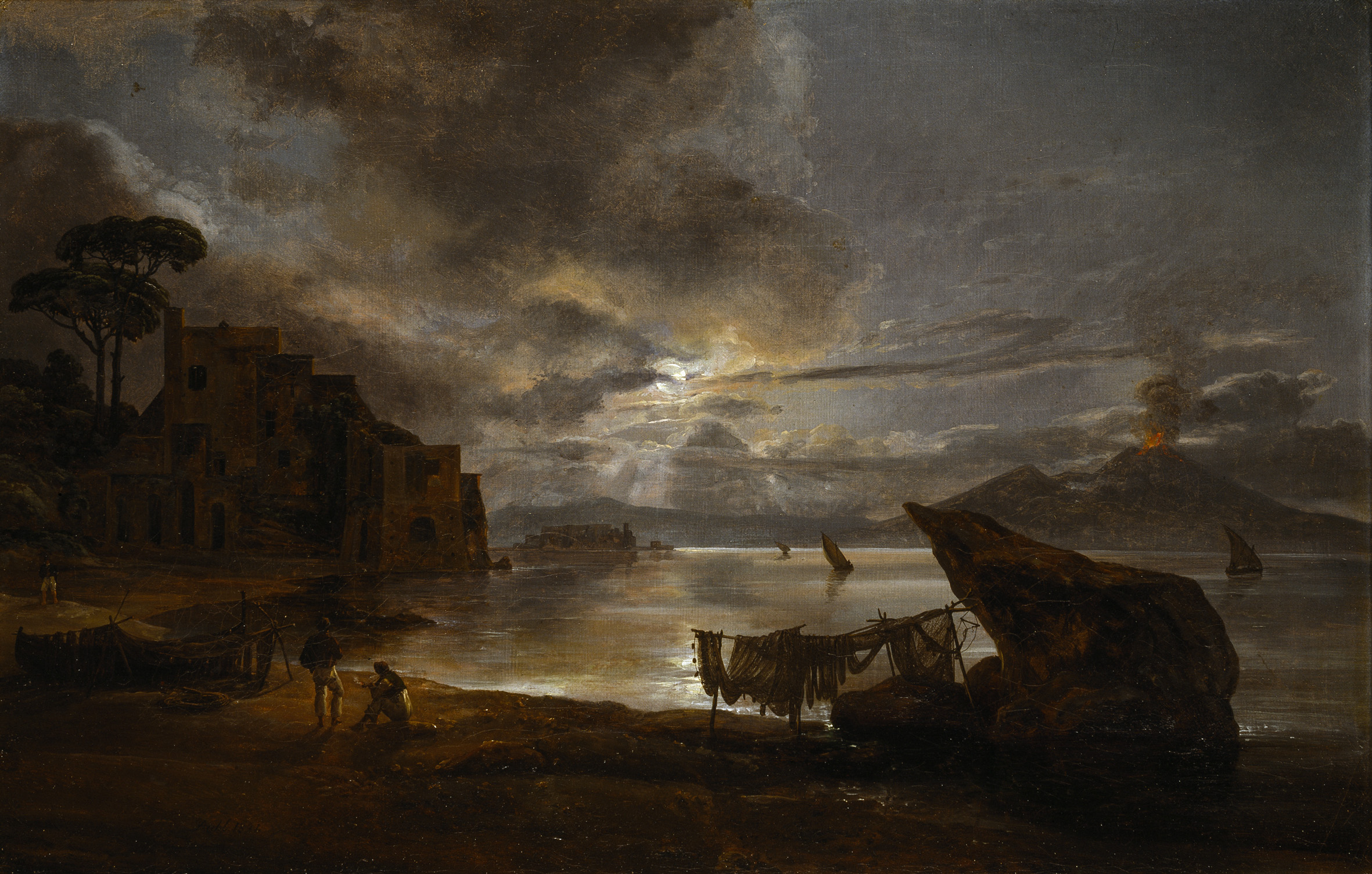
The Bay of Naples by Moonlight (1821)

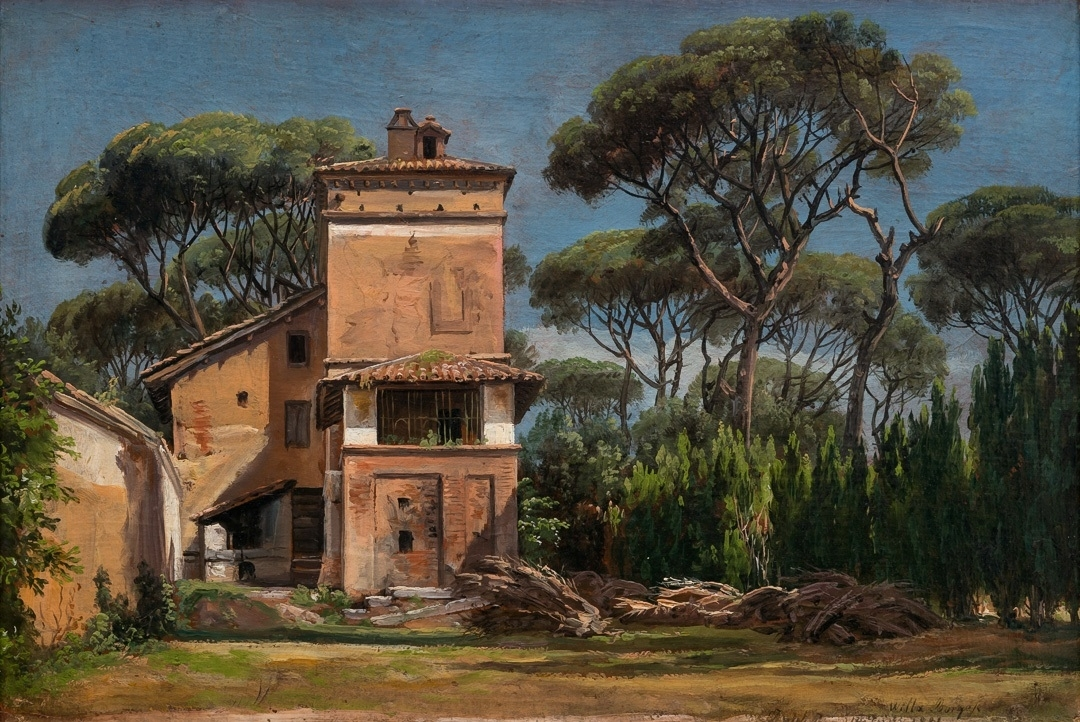
Villa Borghese (1821)

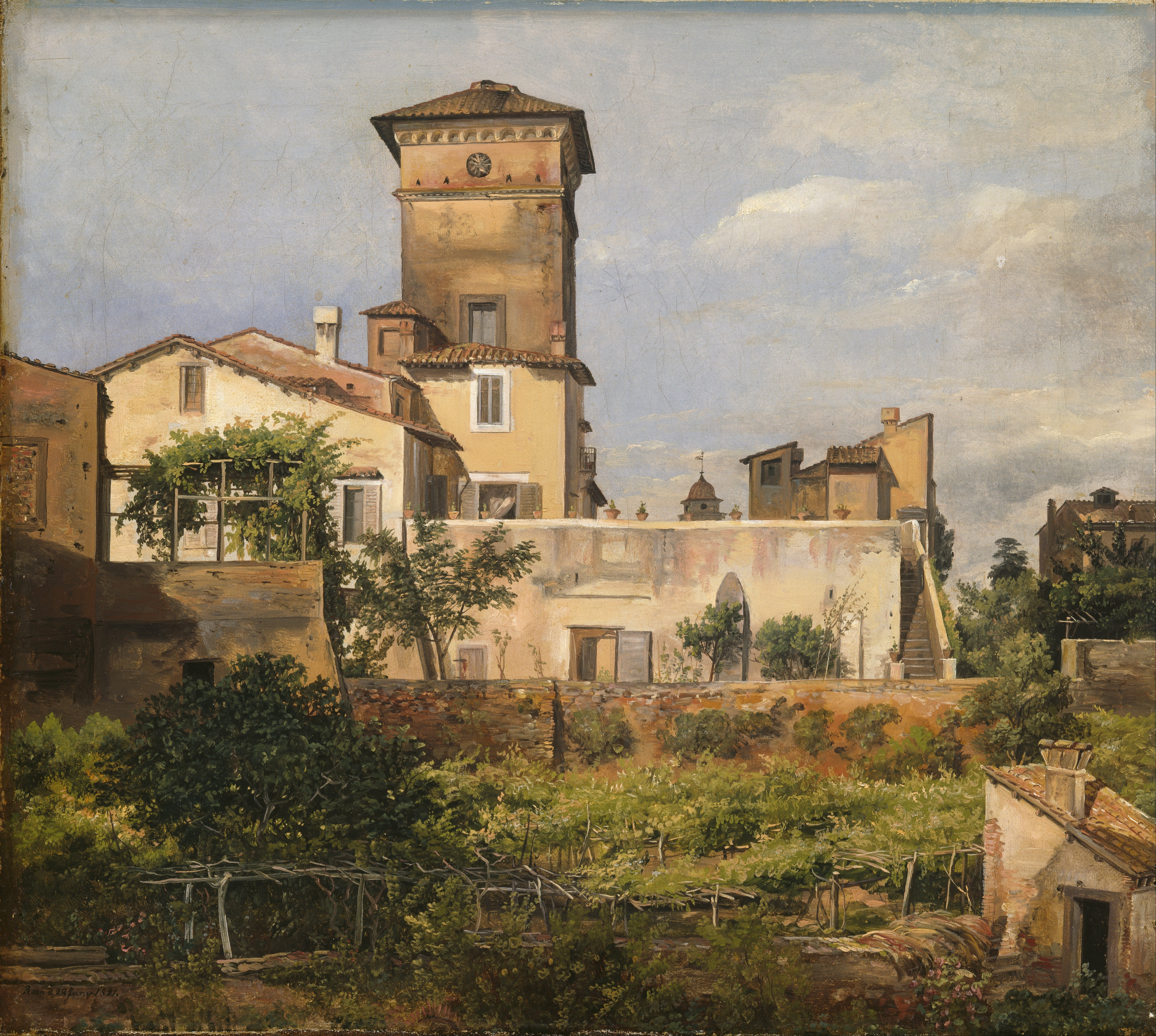
Scene from the Villa Malta (1821)

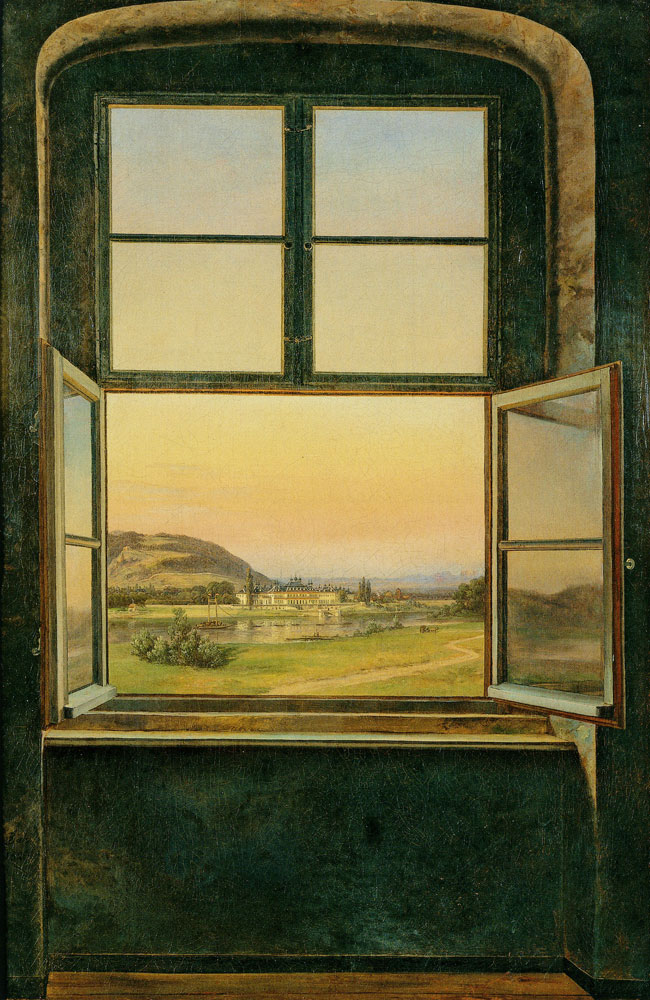
View of Pillnitz Castle (1823)

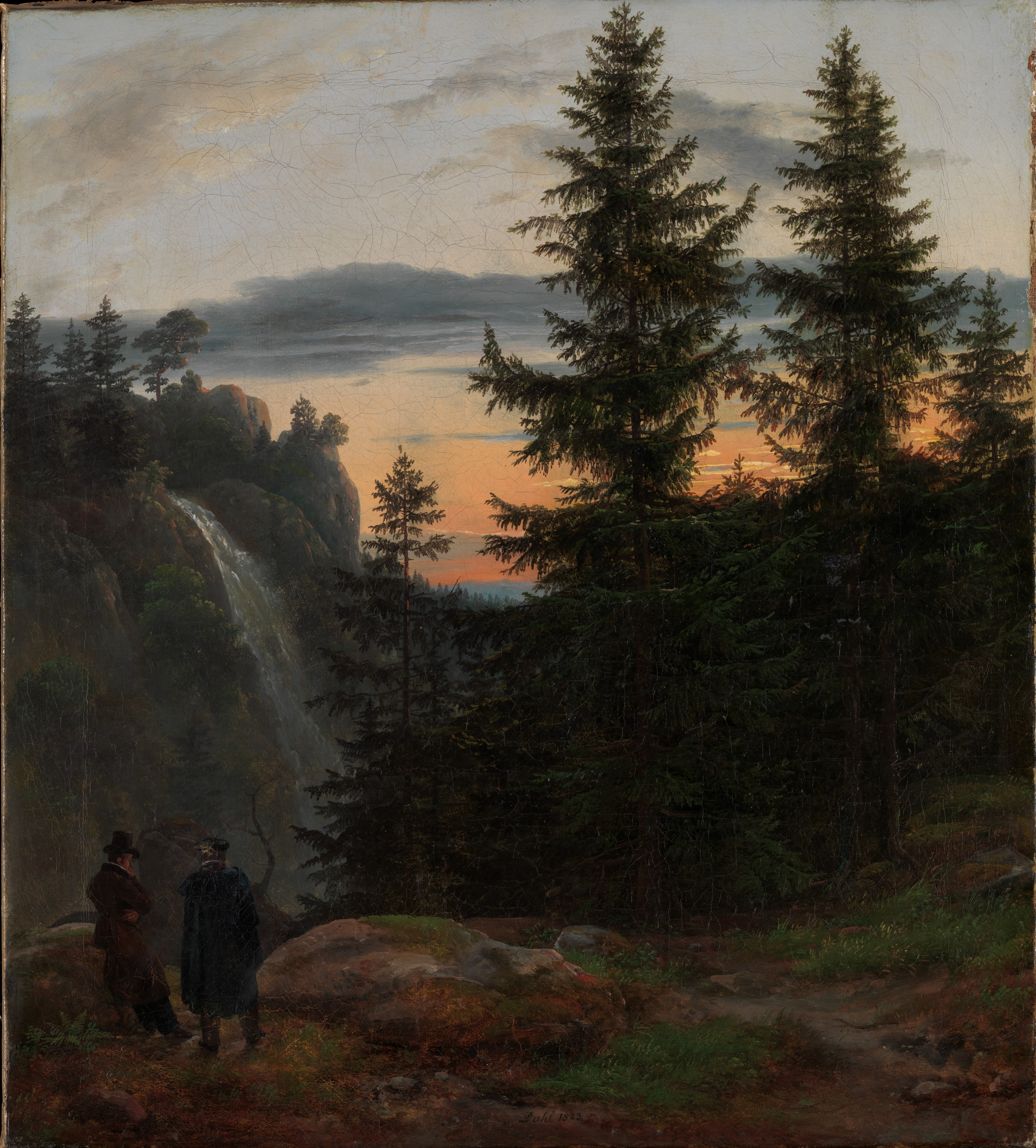
Two Men Before a Waterfall at Sunset (1823)

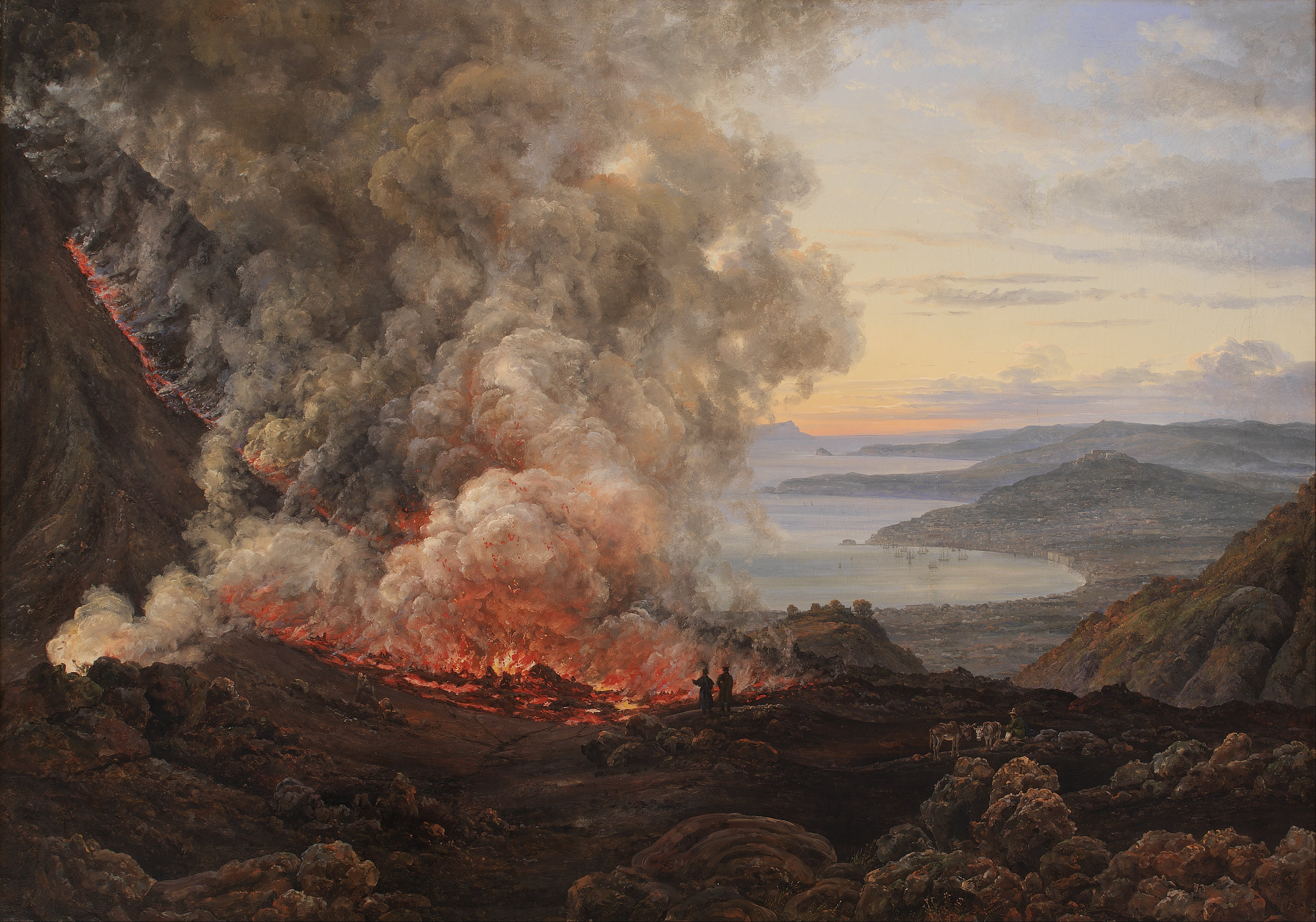
The Eruption of Vesuvius (1826)

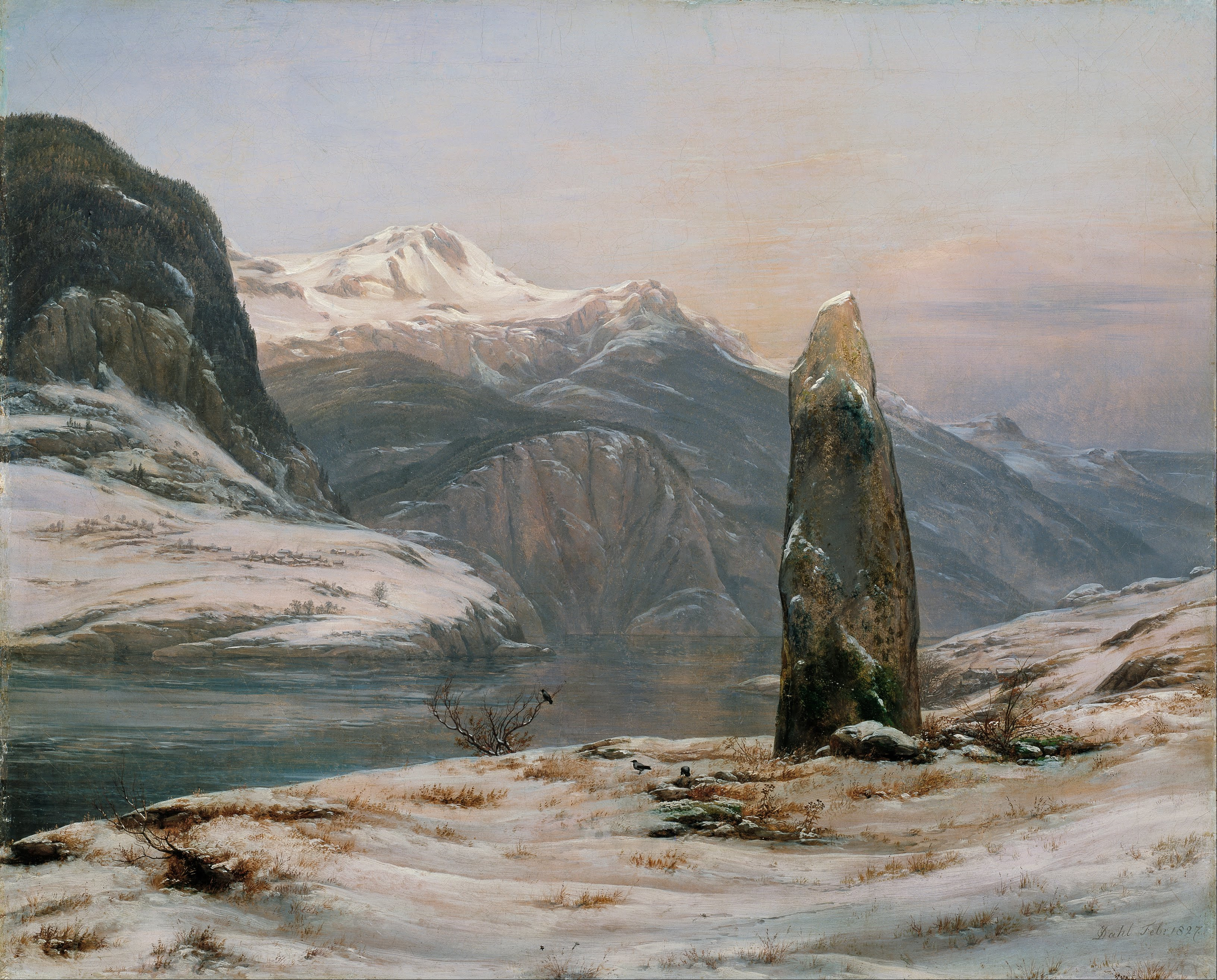
Winter at the Sognefjord (1827)

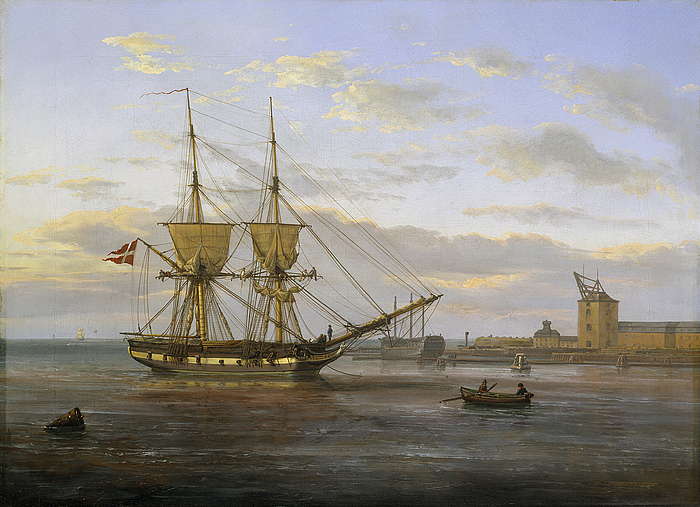
Entrance to Copenhagen (1830)

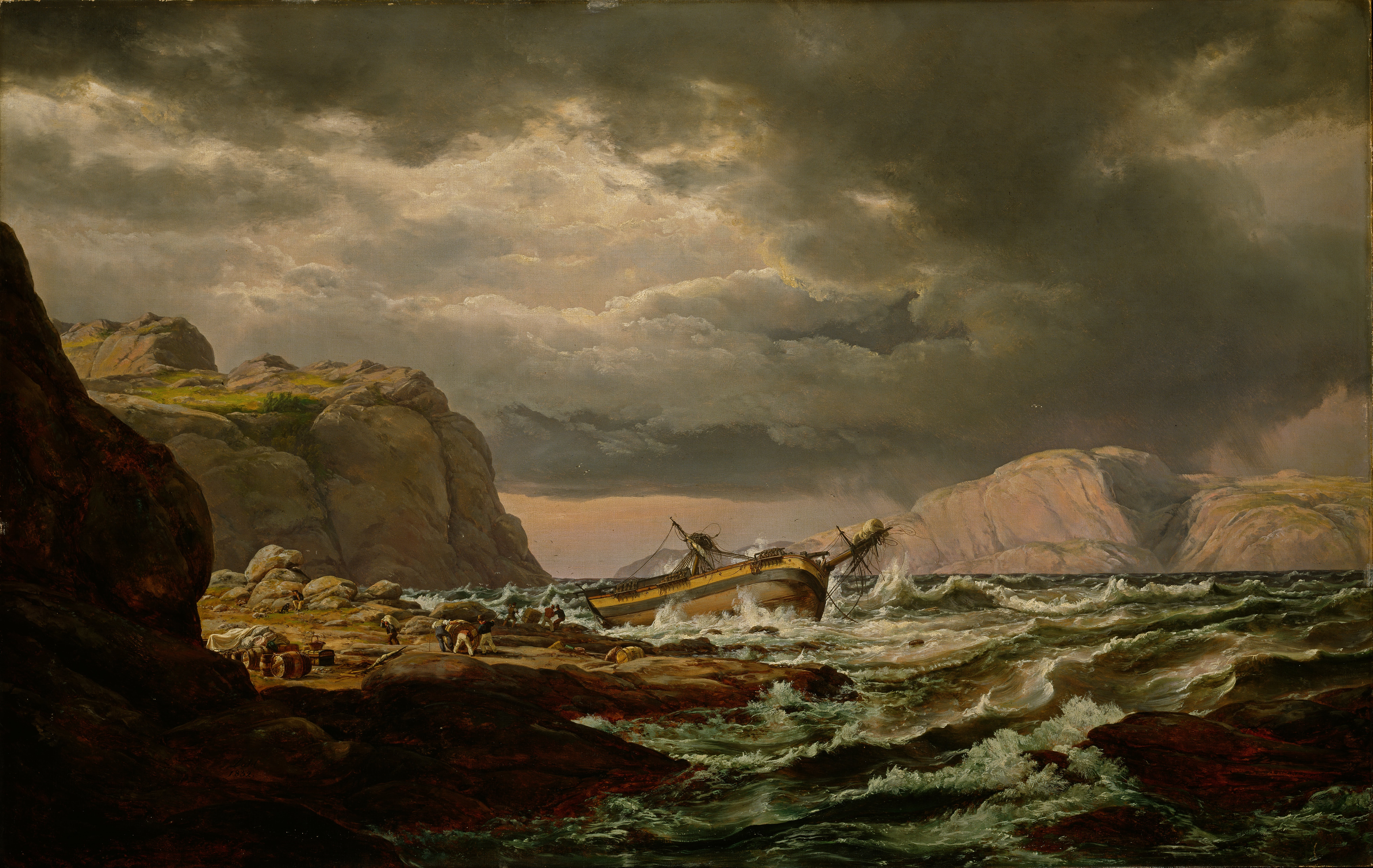
Shipwreck on the Norwegian Coast (1832)

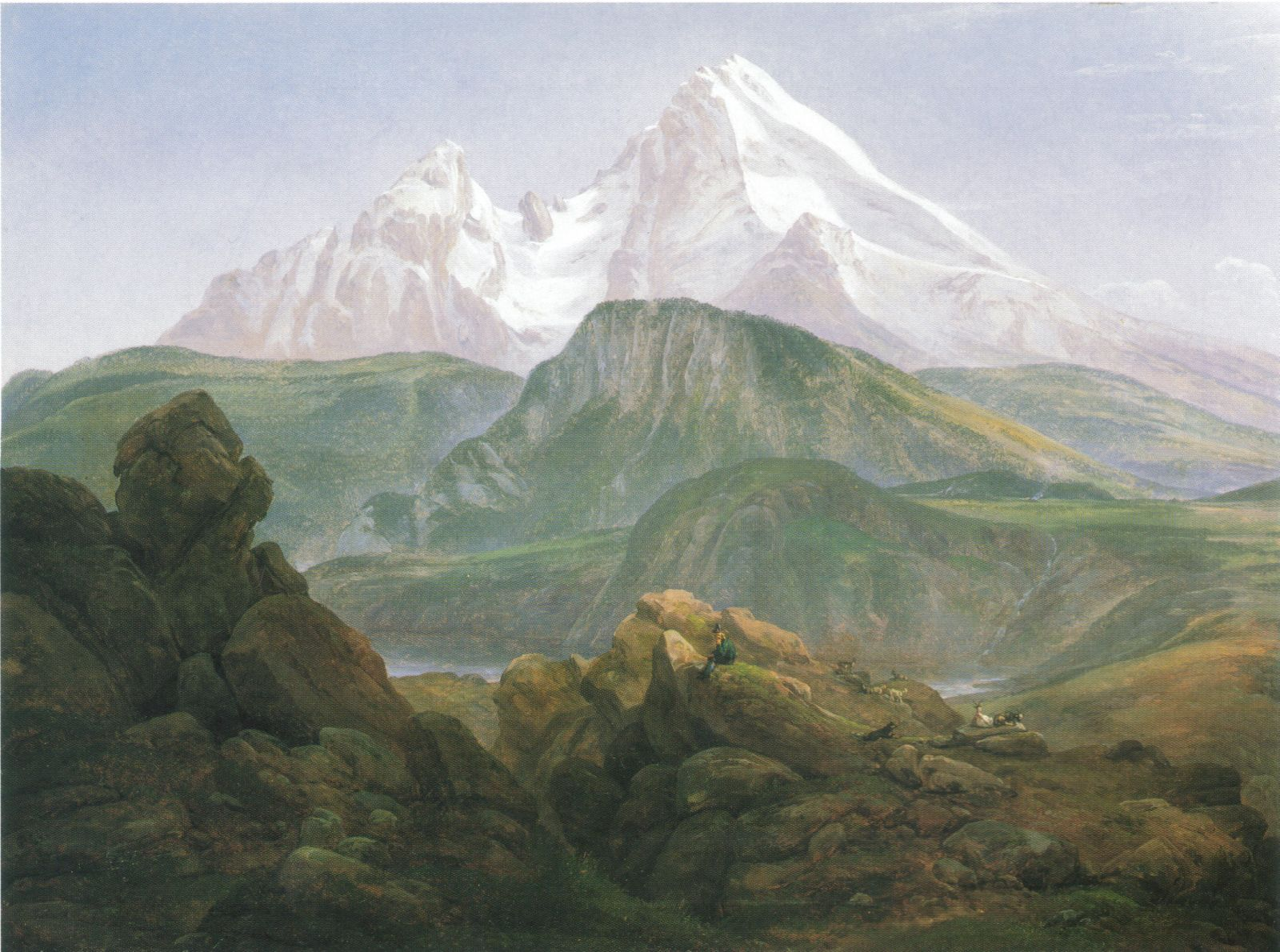
Watzmann (1835)

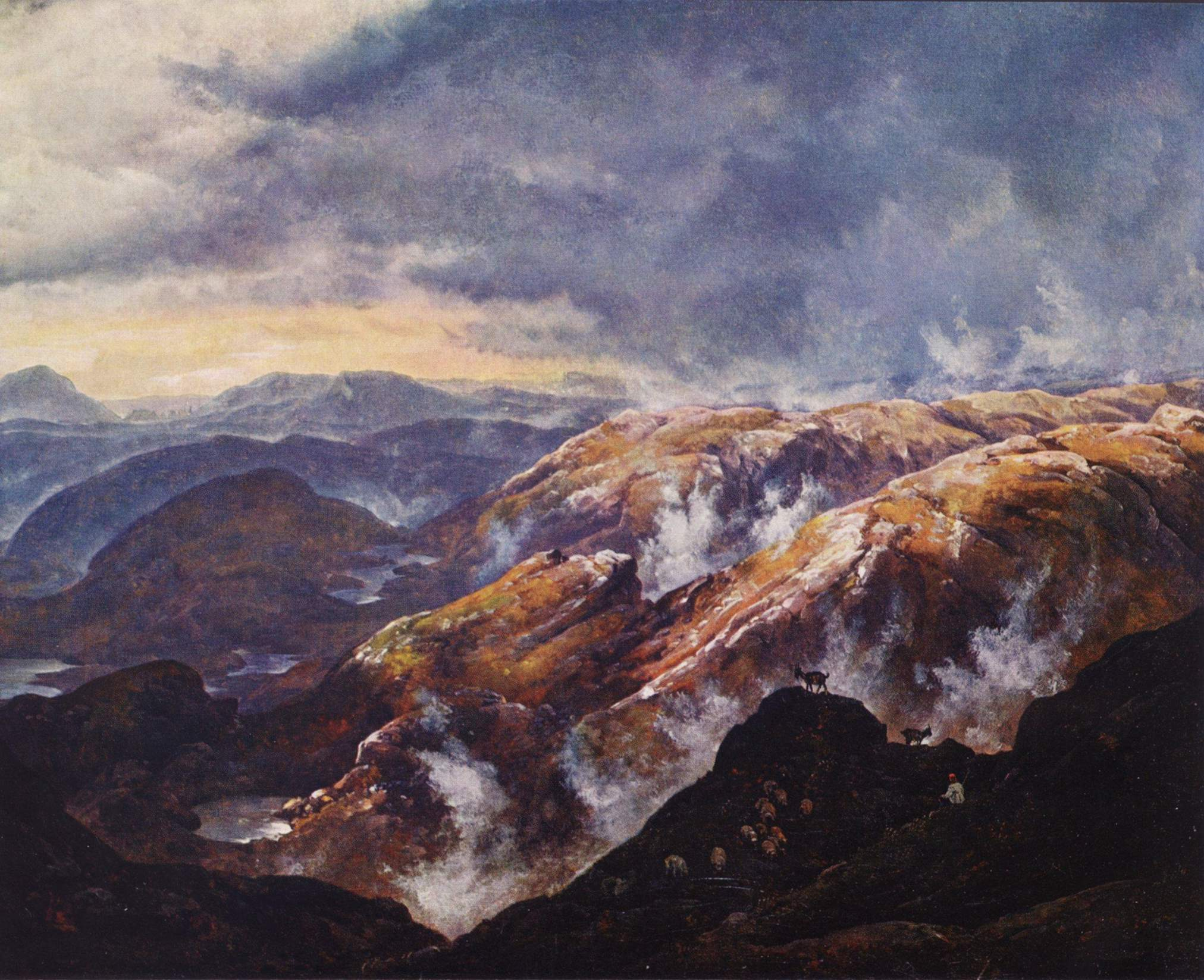
Lyshornet near Bergen (1836)

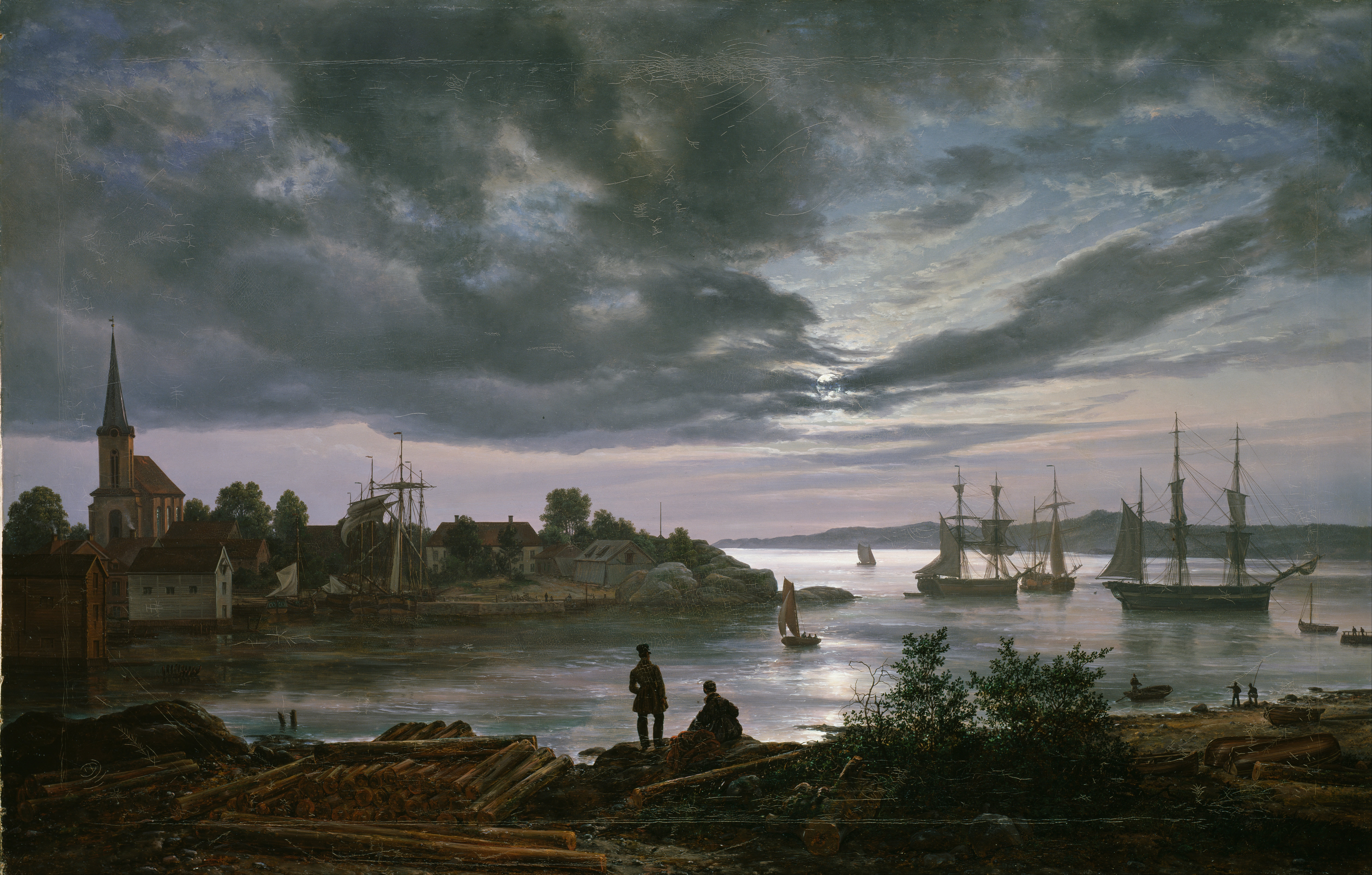
Larvik by Moonlight (1839)

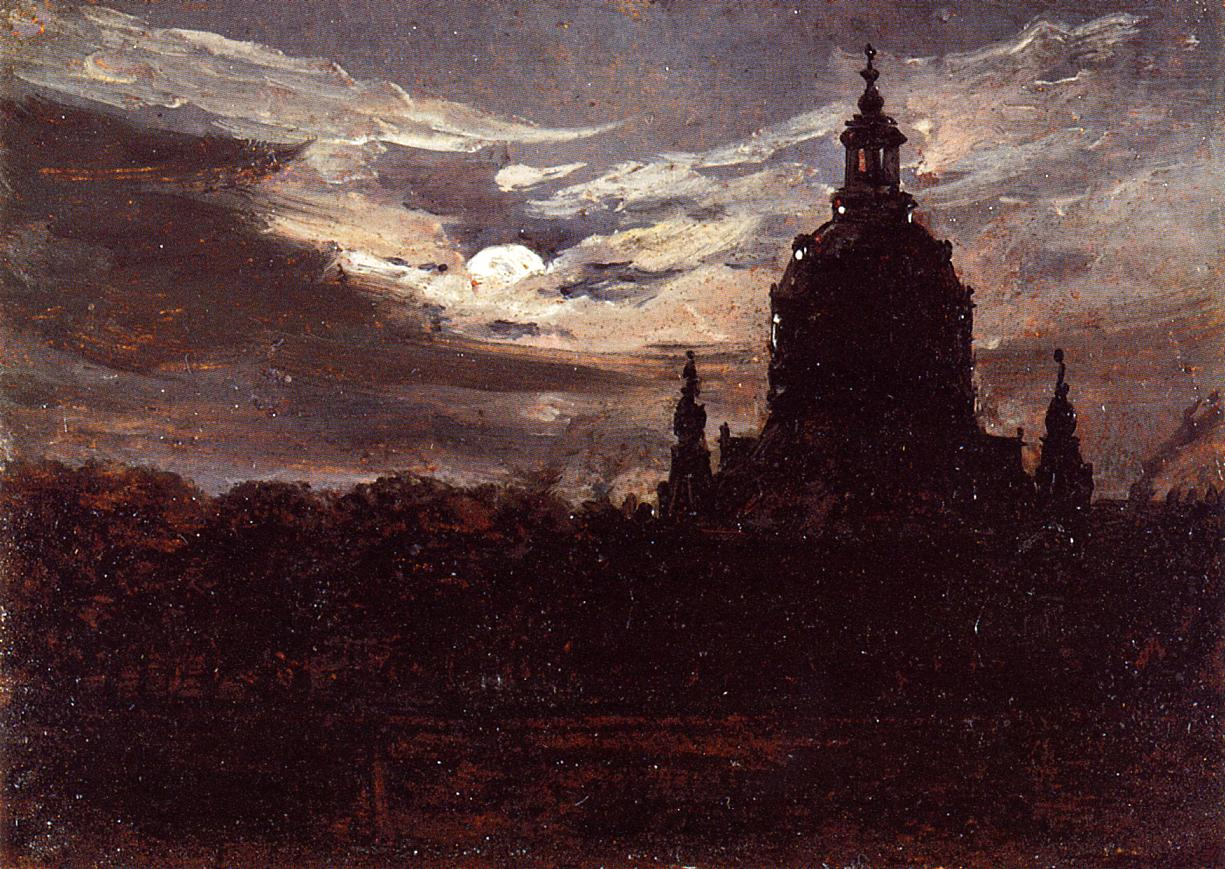
The Frauenkirche, Dresden (1840)

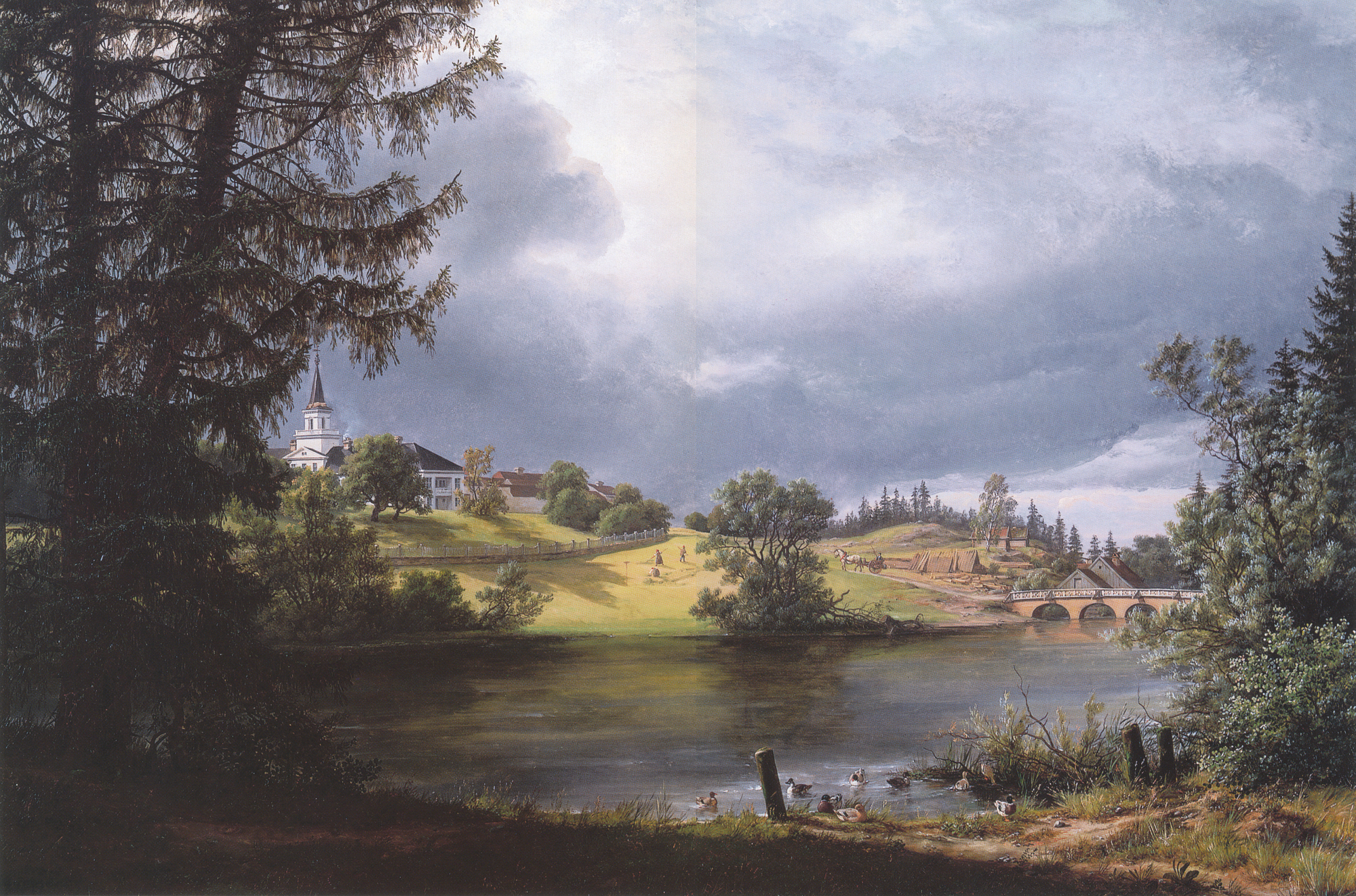
Frogner Manor (1842)

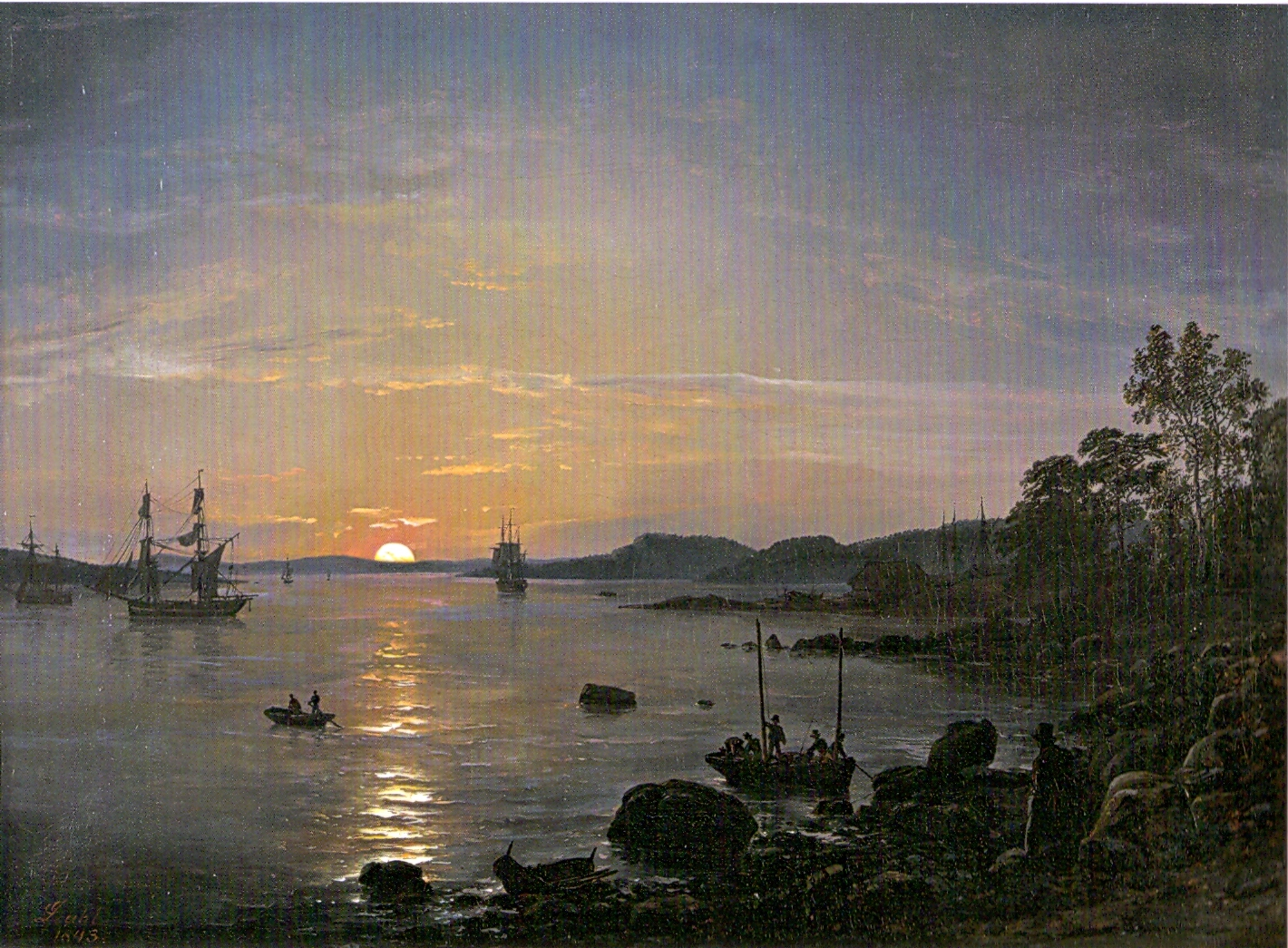
Holmestrand (1843)

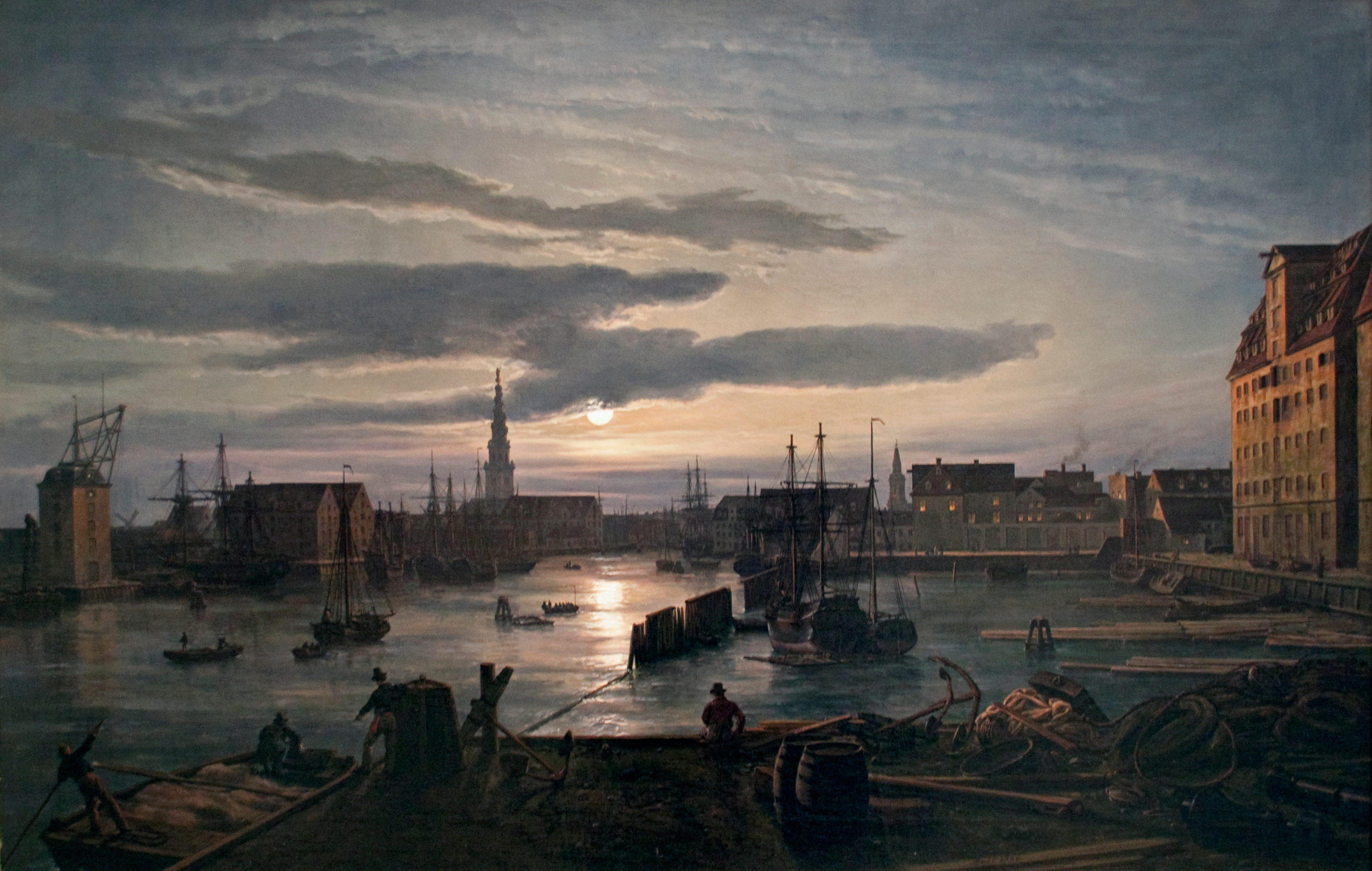
Copenhagen Harbor by Moonlight, (1846)

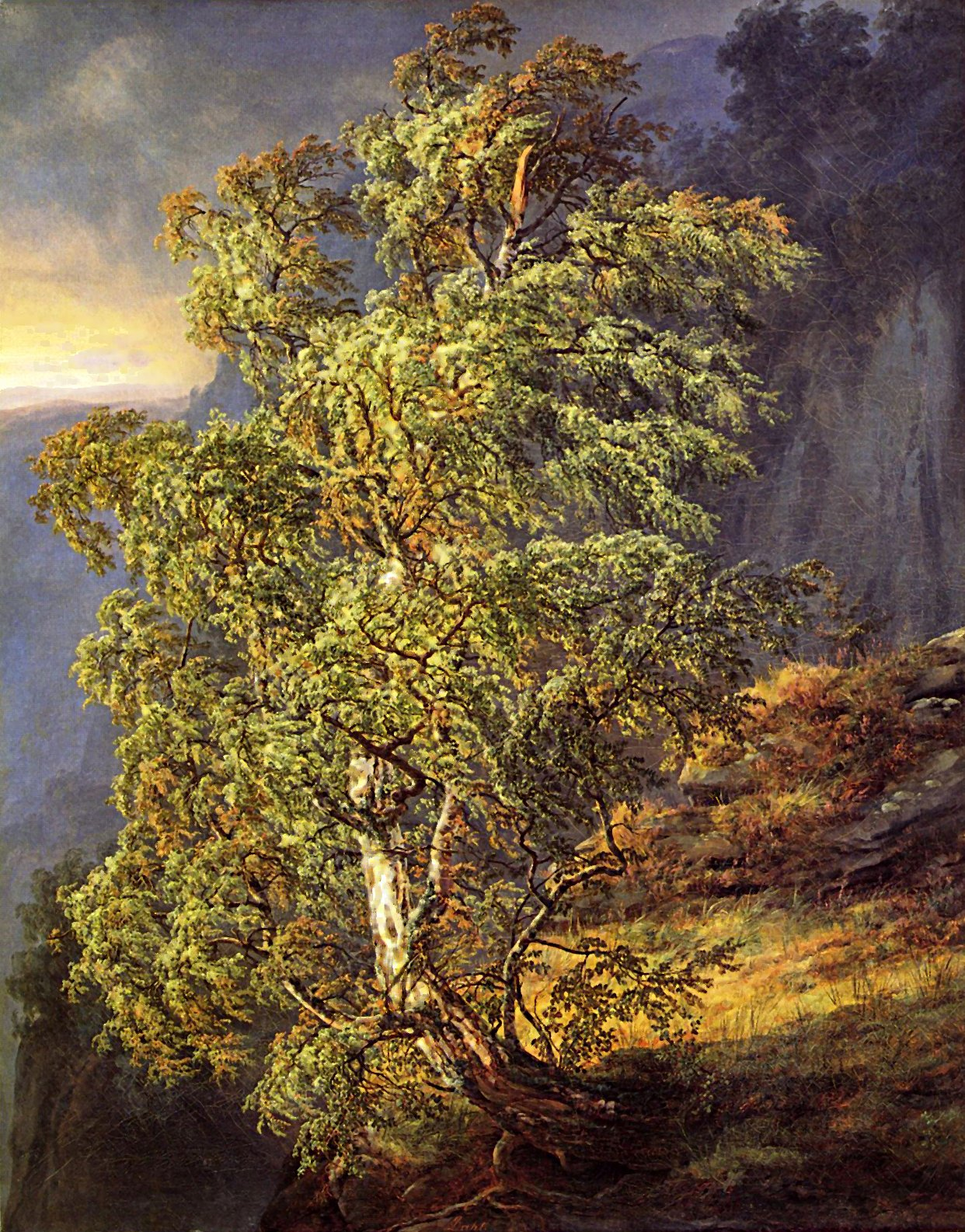
Birch Tree in a Storm (1849)

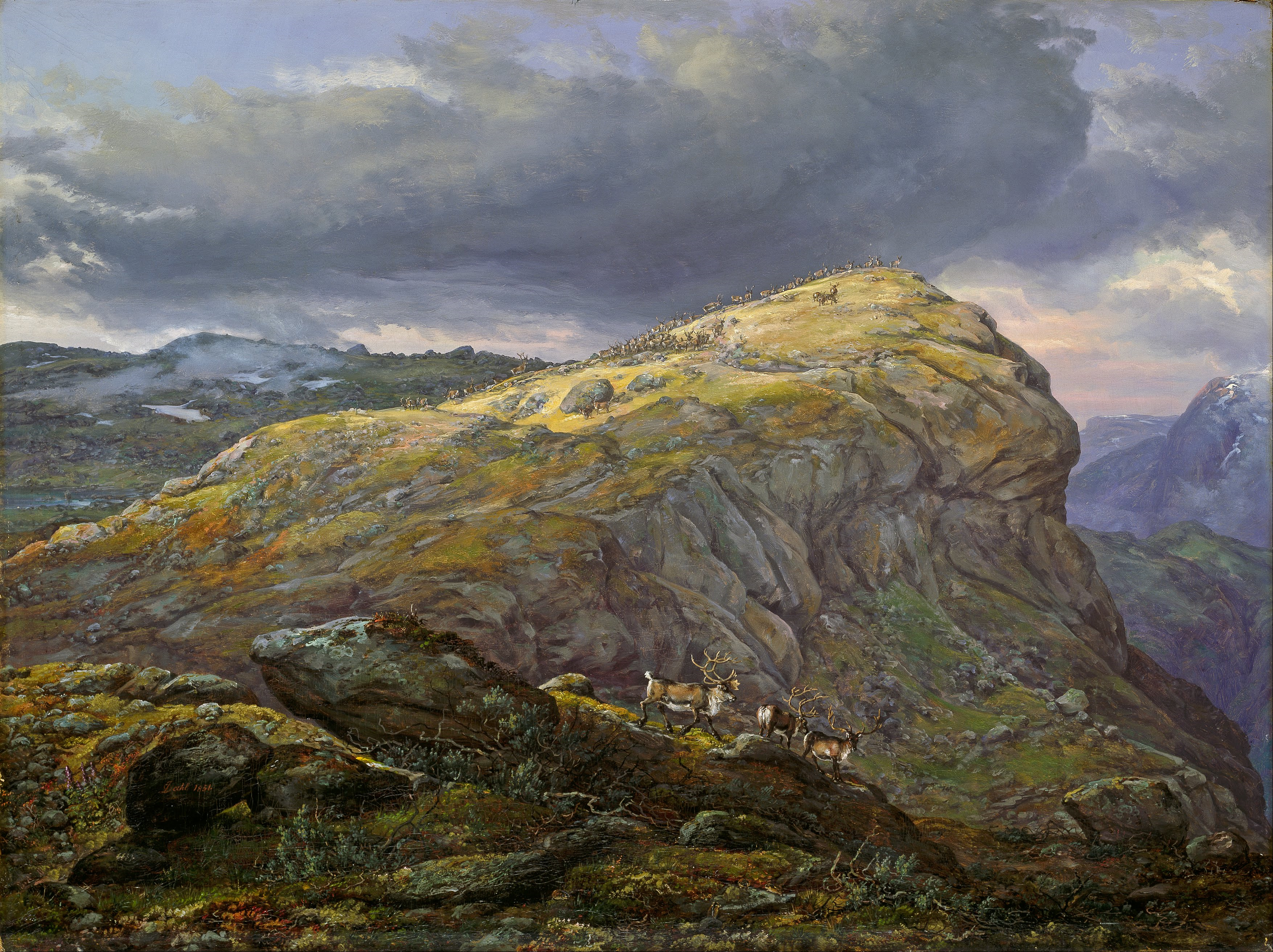
The Stugunøset in the Filefjeld (1851)

== Sources ==
- Aubert, Andreas (1893) Professor Dahl. Et stykke af Aarhundredets Kunst- og Kulturhistorie
- Aubert, Andreas (1894) Den Norske Naturfølelse og Professor Dahl. Hans Kunst og dens Stilling i Aarhundredets Utvikling
- Aubert, Andreas (1920) Maleren Johan Christian Dahl. Et stykke av forrige aarhundres kunst- og kulturhistorie
- Bang, Marie Lødrup (1988) Johan Christian Dahl 1788-1857: Life and Works Volume 1-3 (Scandinavian University Press Publication)
- Heilmann, Christoph (1988) Johan Christian Dahl. 1788-1857 Neue Pinakothek Munchen-1988-1989 (Edition Lipp)
