= Two Men Before a Waterfall at Sunset =

Painting by Johan Christian Dahl

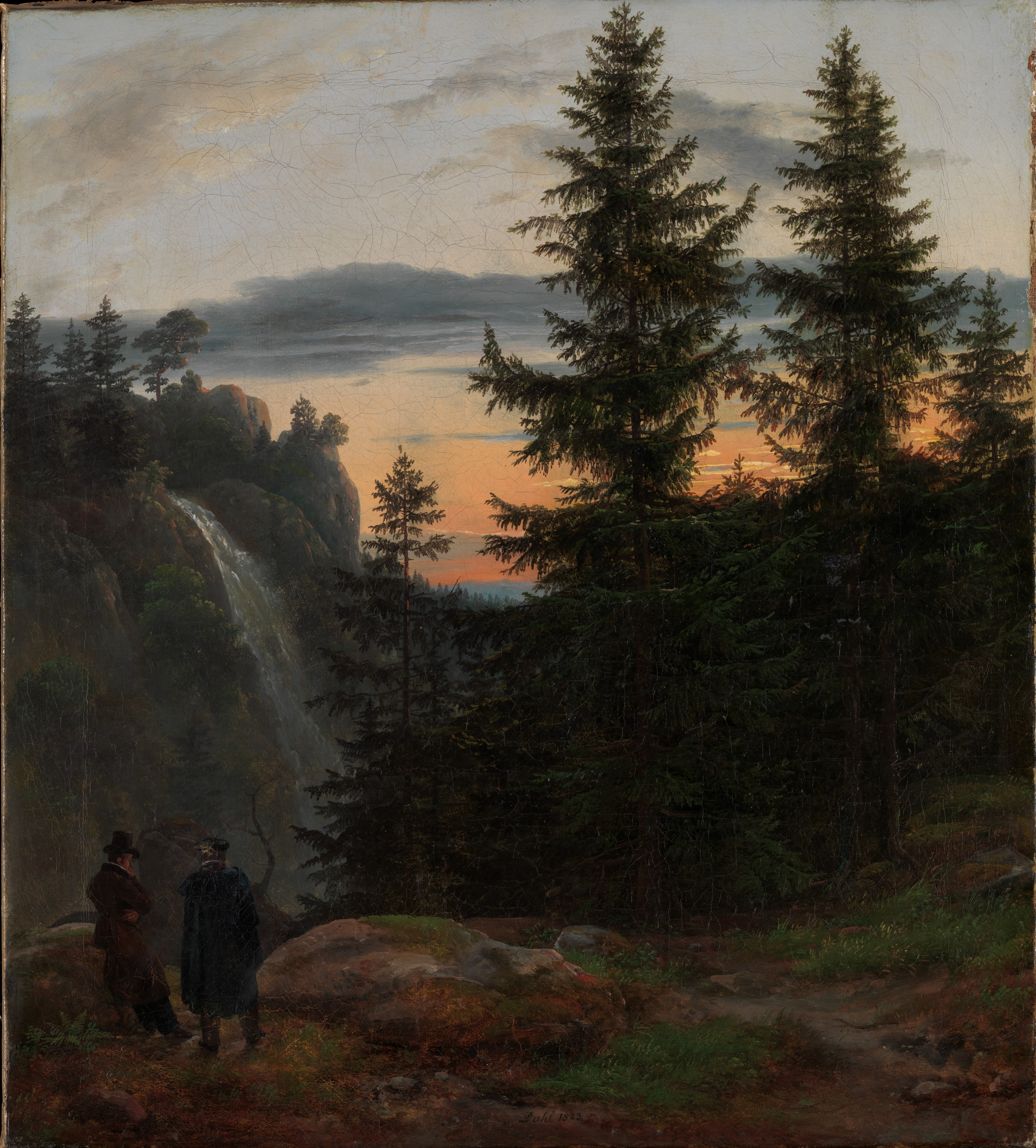
- Artist: Johan Christian Dahl
- Year: 1823
- Type: Oil on canvas, landscape painting
- Dimensions: 39 cm × 35 cm (15 in × 14 in)
- Location: Metropolitan Museum of Art, New York

Two Men Before a Waterfall at Sunset is an 1823 landscape painting by the Norwegian artist Johan Christian Dahl It depicts Dahl and his friend and contemporary Caspar David Friedrich standing in a landscape inspired by his native Norway. It pays home to Friedrich's 1819 work Two Men Contemplating the Moon. The Norwegian Dahl settled in Dresden and worked there for most of his career, but continued to drawn inspiration from his homeland.

The painting is today in the collection of the Metropolitan Museum of Art in New York, having been received as a gift from Christen Sveaas in 2019.

== Bibliography ==
- Hollien, Max. Gifts of Art: The Met’s 150th Anniversary. Metropolitan Museum of Art, 2020
- Rewald, Sabine & Monrad, Kasper . Caspar David Friedrich: Moonwatchers. Metropolitan Museum of Art, 2001.
