= Vidar (disambiguation) =

Vidar or VIDAR may refer to:

- Víðarr, Norse god
- Vidar, Markazi, a village in Markazi Province, Iran
- Vidar class minesweeper
- HNoMS Vidar, several vessels
- SK Vidar, sports club
- FK Vidar, sports club
- IL Vidar, sports club (now a part of Malvik IL)
- Vidar, a DC Comics supervillain
- Vidar Hellners (1928–2021), Swedish diplomat
- Frede Vidar (1911–1967), Danish-born American visual artist
- Video detection and ranging
