= Shipwreck =

Physical remains of a beached or sunk ship

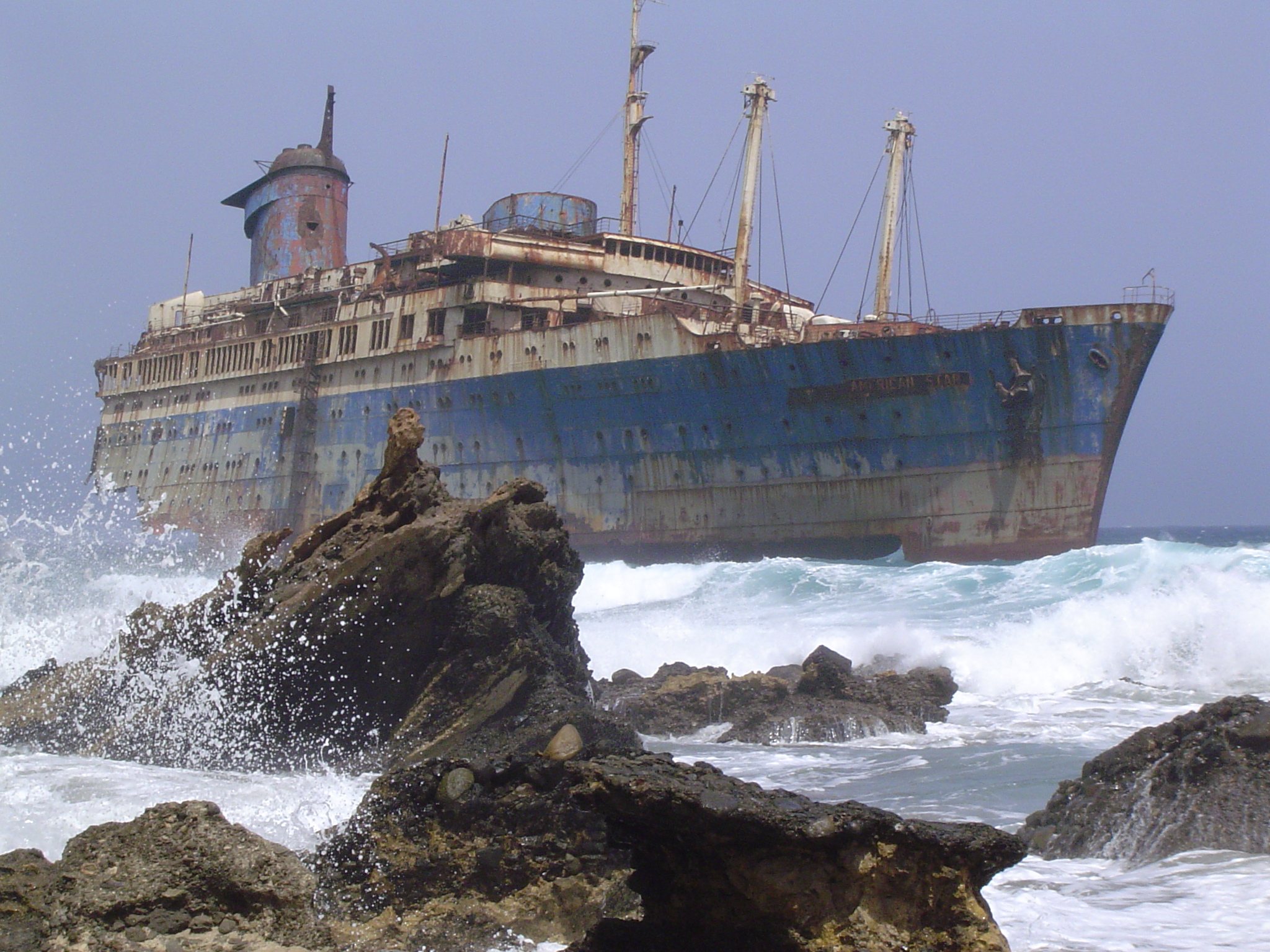
The shipwreck of SS American Star on the shore of Fuerteventura in 2004

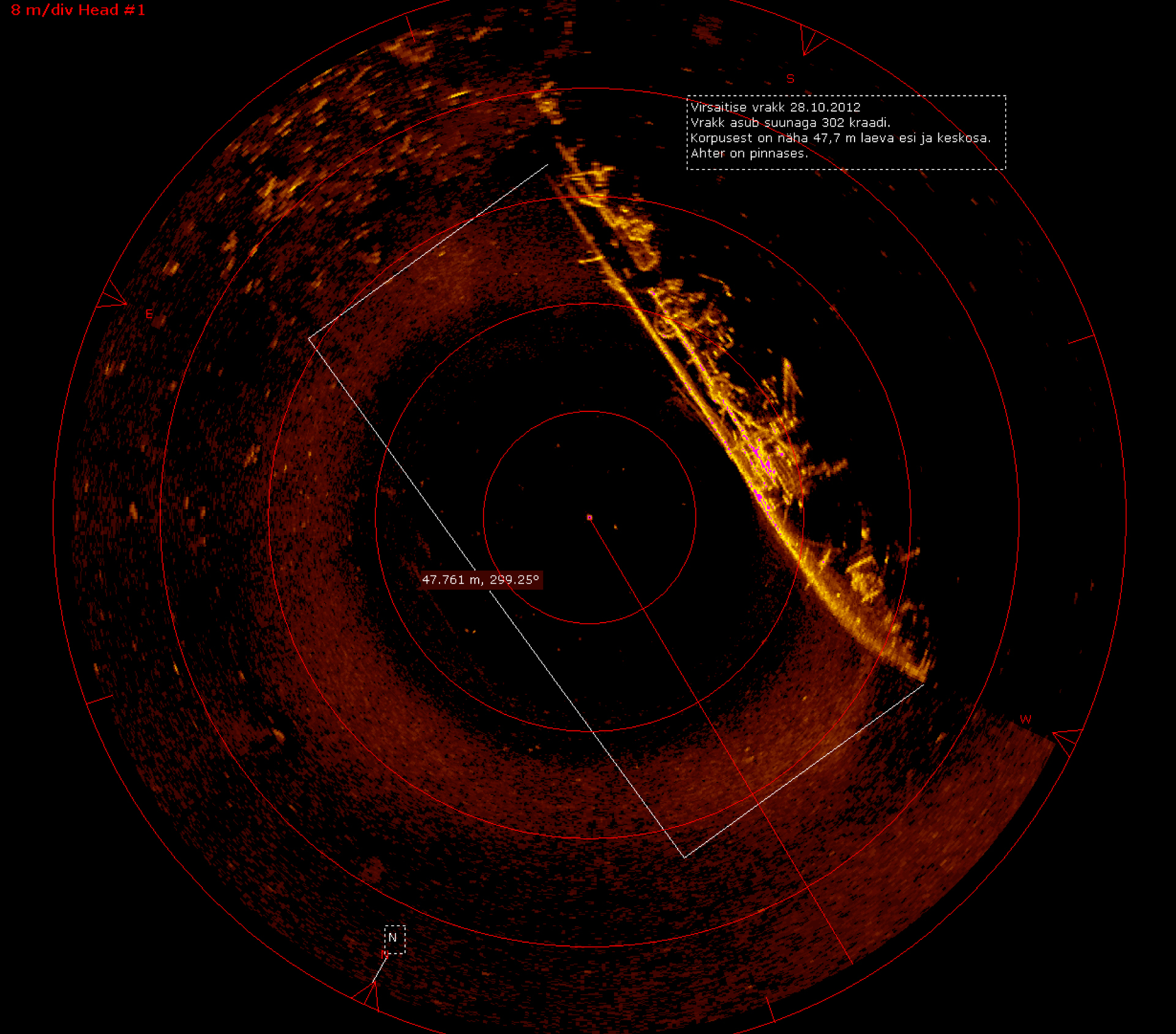
A sonar image of the shipwreck of the Soviet Navy ship Virsaitis in Estonian waters

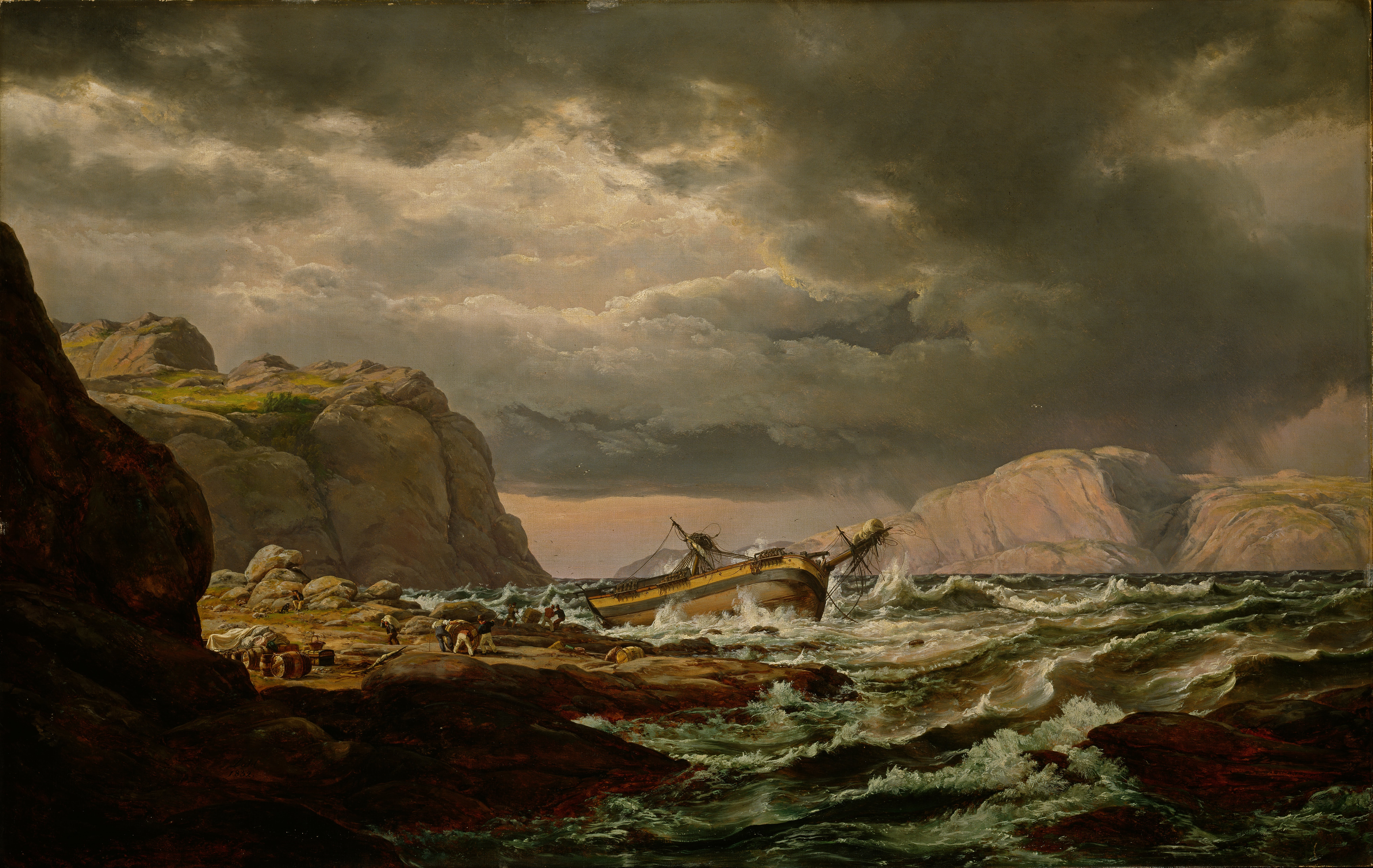
Johan Christian Dahl: Shipwreck on the Norwegian Coast, 1832

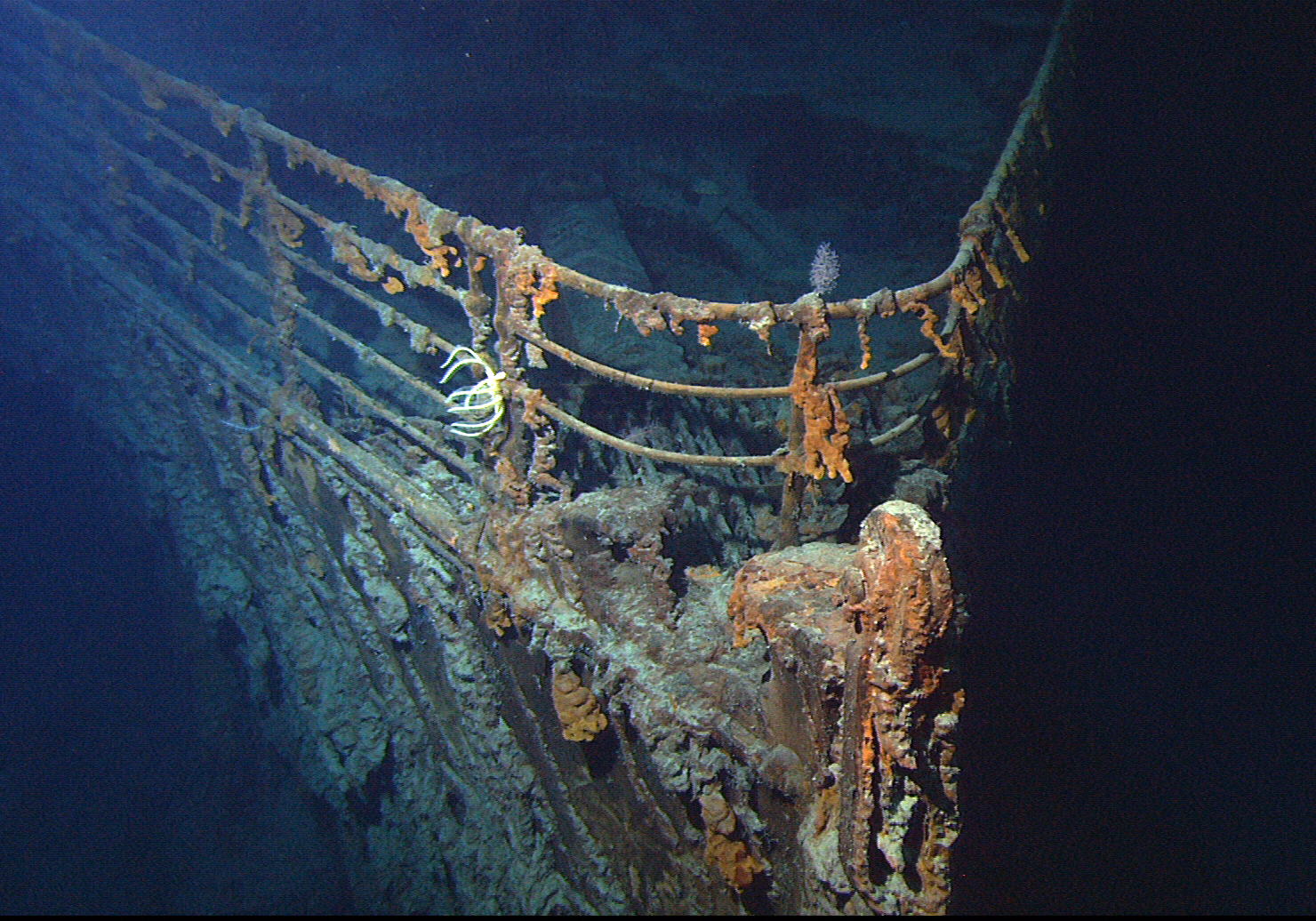
Bow of RMS Titanic, first discovered in 1985

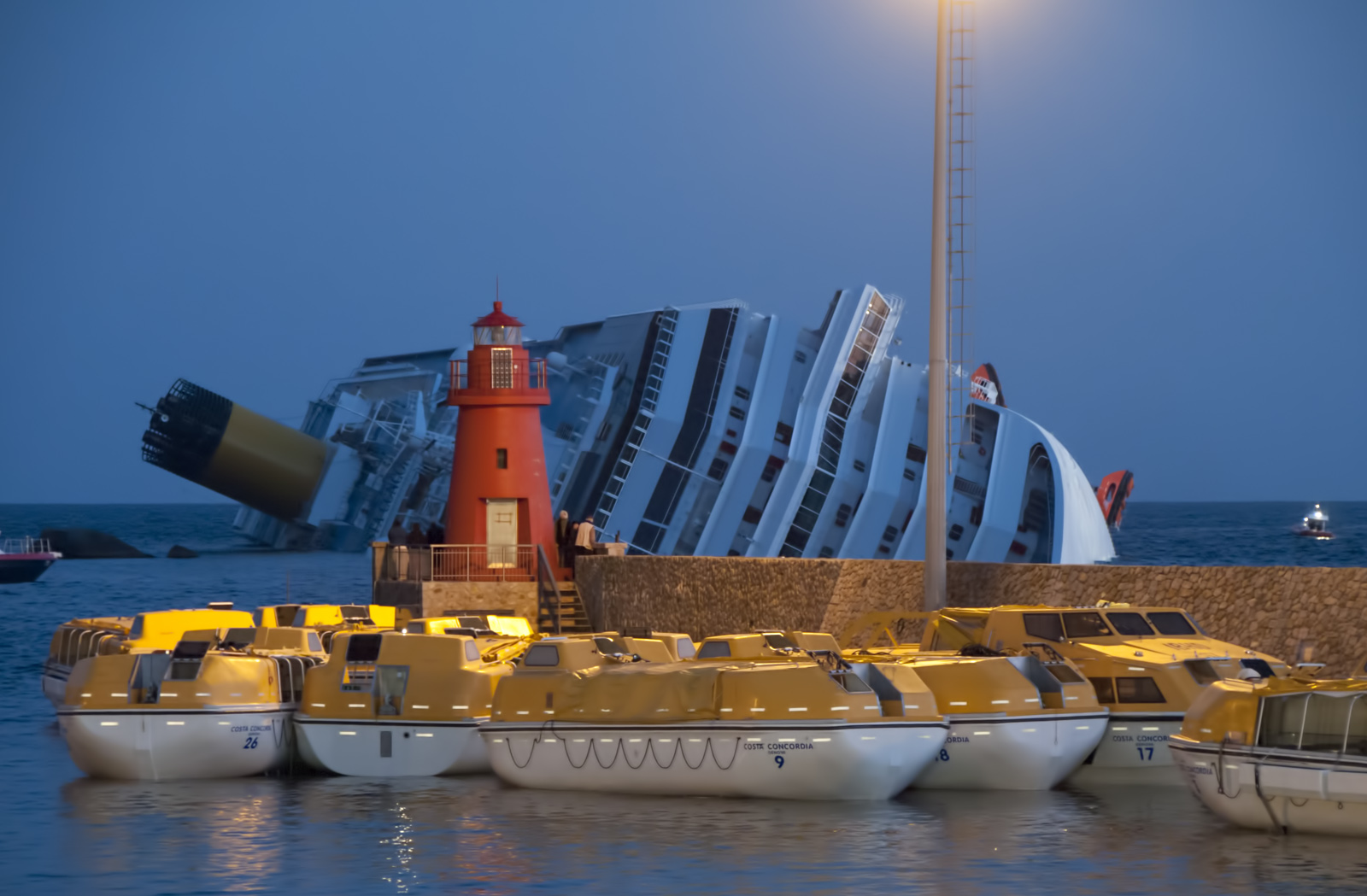
Wreck of Costa Concordia

A shipwreck is the wreckage of a ship that is either beached on land or sunken to the bottom of a body of water. It results from the event of shipwrecking, which may be intentional or unintentional. There were approximately three million shipwrecks worldwide as of January 1999, according to Angela Croome, a science writer and author who specialized in the history of underwater archaeology (an estimate rapidly endorsed by UNESCO and other organizations). When a ship's crew has died or abandoned the ship, and the ship has remained adrift but unsunk, she is instead called a ghost ship.

== Types ==
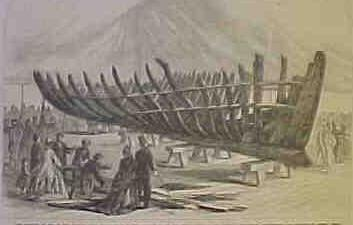
The 1626 Sparrow-Hawk wreck is displayed at the Pilgrim Hall Museum in Plymouth, Massachusetts

=== Historic wrecks ===
Historic wrecks are attractive to maritime archaeologists because they preserve historical information: for example, studying the wreck of Mary Rose revealed information about seafaring, warfare, and life in the 16th century. Military wrecks, caused by a skirmish at sea, are studied to find details about the historic event; they reveal much about the battle that occurred. Discoveries of treasure ships, often from the period of European colonisation, that may have sunk in remote locations leaving few living witnesses, such as Batavia, still occur.

=== Environmental hazards ===
Some contemporary wrecks, such as the oil tanker Prestige or Erika, are of interest primarily because of their potential harm to the environment.

=== Artificial reefs and dive sites ===
Other contemporary wrecks are scuttled in order to spur reef growth, such as Adolphus Busch and Ocean Freeze. Many contemporary and historic wrecks, such as Thistlegorm, are of interest to recreational divers that dive to shipwrecks because they are interesting to explore, provide large habitats for many types of marine life, and have an interesting history.

=== Well known incidents and disasters ===
Well-known shipwrecks include the catastrophic Titanic, Doña Paz, Britannic, Lusitania, Estonia, Empress of Ireland, Andrea Doria, Endurance, Costa Concordia, HMS Pandora and SS Waratah.

=== Abandoned or scuttled derelicts ===
There are also thousands of wrecks that were not lost at sea but have been abandoned or sunk. These abandoned, or derelict, ships are typically smaller craft, such as fishing vessels. They may pose a hazard to navigation and may be removed by port authorities.

== Causes ==
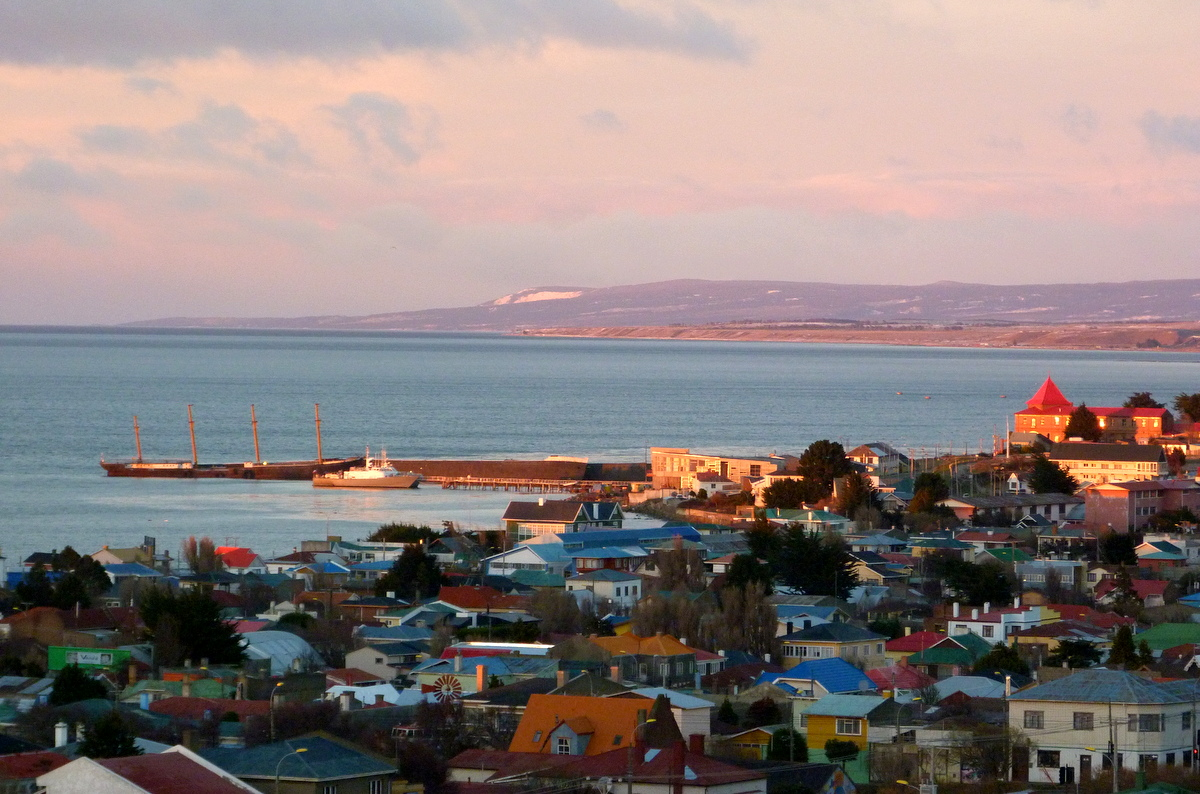
County of Peebles, used as breakwater in Punta Arenas at the Strait of Magellan

Poor design, improperly stowed cargo, navigation and other human errors leading to collisions (with another ship, the shoreline, an iceberg, etc.), inadequate maintenance, bad weather, fire, and other causes can lead to accidental sinking. Intentional reasons for sinking a ship include: intending to form an artificial reef; destruction due to warfare, piracy, mutiny or sabotage; using the vessel for target practice; or removing a hazard to navigation. A scuttled ship can be also used as breakwater structure or to deny or restrict access to an area to other shipping.

== Distribution ==
Shipwrecks are widely distributed, but are concentrated where there is more shipping and more navigational hazards. Some shipwrecks have been recorded and the circumstances of loss may be known. Other ships have disappeared without trace and are assumed to have been wrecked.

== State of preservation ==
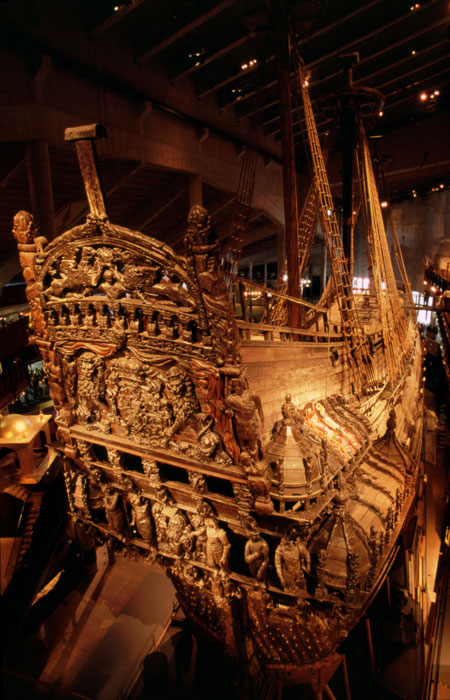
Vasa is one of the oldest and best-preserved ships salvaged in the world, owing to the cool temperatures and low salinity of the Baltic Sea

Many factors determine the state of preservation of a wreck:

- the ship's construction materials
- the wreck becoming covered in sand or silt
- the salinity of the water the wreck is in
- the level of destruction involved in the ship's loss
- whether the components or cargo of the wreck were salvaged
- whether the wreck was demolished to clear a navigable channel
- the depth of water at the wreck site
- the strength of tidal currents or wave action at the wreck site
- the exposure to surface weather conditions at the wreck site
- the presence of marine life that consume the ship's fabric
- temperature
- the acidity (or pH), and other chemical characteristics of the water at the site

The above—especially the stratification (silt/sand sediments piled up on the shipwrecks) and the damages caused by marine creatures—is better described as "stratification and contamination" of shipwrecks. The stratification not only creates another challenge for marine archaeology, but also a challenge to determine its primary state, i.e. the state that it was in when it sank.

Stratification includes several different types of sand and silt, as well as tumulus and encrustations. These "sediments" are tightly linked to the type of currents, depth, and the type of water (salinity, pH, etc.), which implies any chemical reactions that would affect potential cargo (such as wine, olive oil, spices, etc.).

Besides this geological phenomenon, wrecks also face the damage of marine creatures that create a home out of them, primarily octopuses and crustaceans. These creatures affect the primary state because they move, or break, any parts of the shipwreck that are in their way, thereby affecting the original condition of amphorae, for example, or any other hollow places. Finally, in addition to the slight or severe destruction marine animals can create, there are also "external" contaminants, such as the artifacts on and around the wreck at Pickles Reef and the over-lapping wrecks at the Molasses Reef Wreck, or contemporary pollution in bodies of water, that severely affect shipwrecks by changing the chemical structures, or further damaging what is left of a specific ship.

Despite these challenges, if the information retrieved does not appear to be sufficient, or a poor preservation is achieved, authors like J.A. Parker claim that it is the historical value of the shipwreck that counts as well as any slight piece of information or evidence that is acquired.

=== Construction materials ===
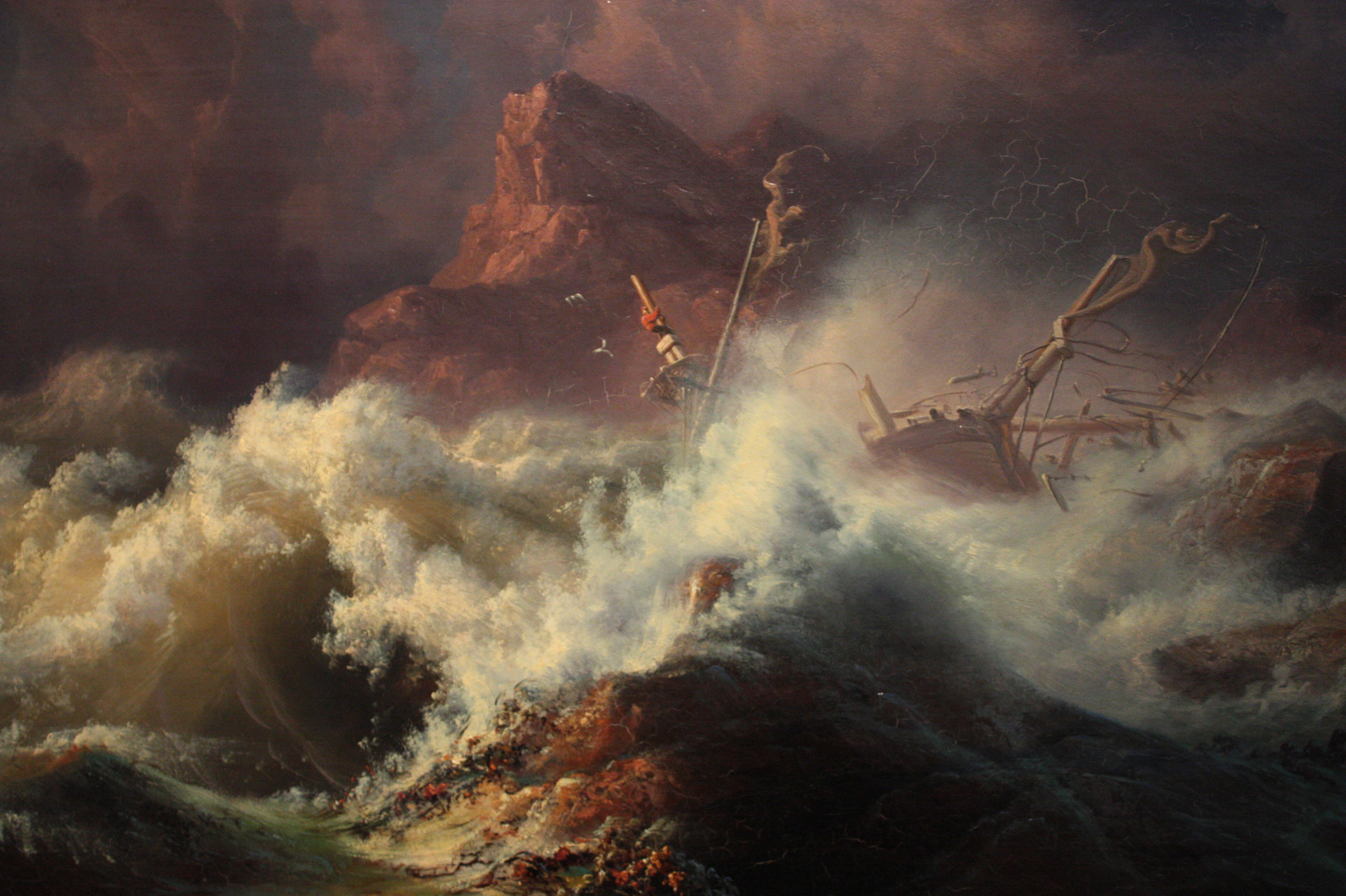
The Wreck, by Knud-Andreassen Baade c. 1835

Exposed wooden components decay quickly. Often the only wooden parts of ships that remain after a century are those that were buried in silt or sand soon after the sinking. An example of this is Mary Rose.

Steel and iron, depending on their thickness, may retain the ship's structure for decades. As corrosion takes place, sometimes accelerated by tides and weather, the structure collapses. Thicker ferrous objects such as cannons, boilers or the pressure vessel of a submarine generally survive longer underwater in spite of corrosion.

Propellers, condensers, hinges and portholes were often made from non-ferrous metals such as brass and bronze, which do not corrode easily.

=== Salinity of water ===
==== Fresh and low salinity water ====
Shipwrecks in some freshwater lakes, such as the Great Lakes of North America, have remained intact with little degradation. In some sea areas, most notably in Gulf of Bothnia and Gulf of Finland, salinity is very low, and centuries-old wrecks have been preserved in reasonable condition. However, bacteria found in fresh water can cause the wood of wrecked ships to rot more quickly than in seawater unless it is deprived of oxygen. Two shipwrecks, USS Hamilton and USS Scourge, have been at the bottom of Lake Ontario since they sunk during a violent storm on August 8, 1813, during the War of 1812. They are in "remarkably good" condition.

==== Seawater ====
Wrecks typically decay rapidly when in seawater. There are several reasons for this:

- Iron-based metals corrode much more quickly in seawater because of the dissolved salt present; the sodium and chloride ions chemically accelerate the process of metal oxidation which, in the case of ferrous metals, leads to rust. Such cases are prominent on deep-water shipwrecks, such as RMS Titanic (sank 1912), RMS Lusitania (sank 1915), and German battleship Bismarck (sank 1941). However, there are some exceptions; RMS Empress of Ireland (sank 1914) lies in the saltwater portion of the St. Lawrence River, but is still in remarkably good condition.
- Unprotected wood in seawater is rapidly consumed by shipworms and small wood-boring sea creatures. Shipworms found in higher salinity waters, such as the Caribbean, are notorious for boring into wooden structures that are immersed in sea water and can completely destroy the hull of a wooden shipwreck.

=== Loss, salvage, and demolition ===
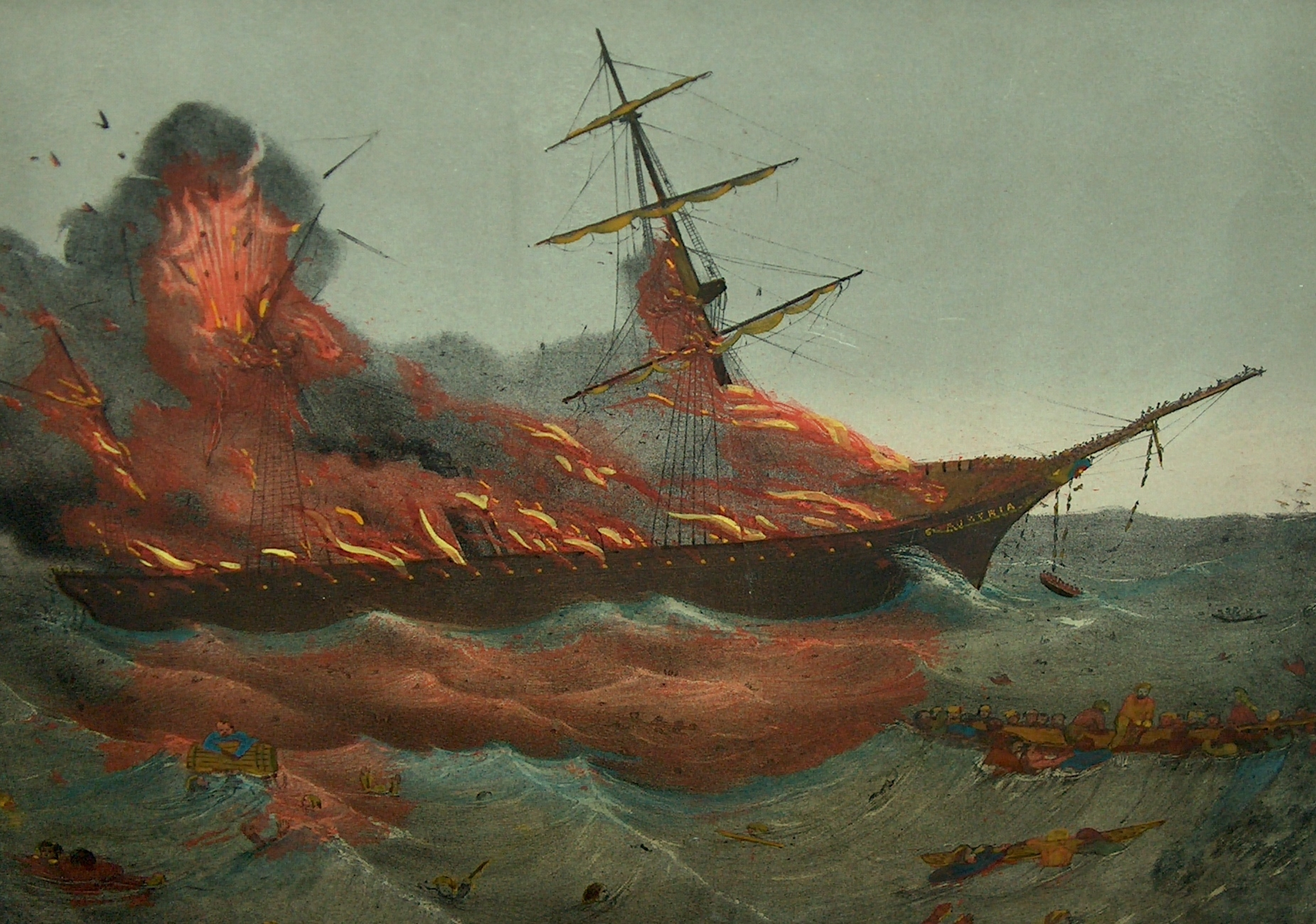
The shipwreck of SS Austria on 13 September 1858

An important factor in the condition of the wreck is the level of destruction at the time of the loss or shortly afterward due to the nature of the loss, salvage or later demolition. Examples of severe destruction at the time of loss are:

- Being blown onto a beach, reef, or rocks during a storm, termed "grounding" (e.g., Royal Adelaide)
- Collision with another ship (e.g., Andrea Doria)
- Catastrophic explosion (e.g., HMS Hood), steamship boilers often explode when water covers them during the process of sinking
- Fire that burns for a long time before the ship sinks (e.g., Achille Lauro)
- Foundering, i.e., taking in so much water that buoyancy is lost and the ship sinks (e.g., RMS Titanic and HMHS Britannic); some ships with a dense cargo (e.g., iron ore) may break up when sinking quickly and hitting a rocky seabed
- Enemy action from aerial bombs or torpedoes that may cause destruction before sinking (e.g., the Italian battleship Roma and HMS Barham)

After the loss, the vessel's owners may attempt to salvage valuable parts of the ship and its cargo. This operation can cause further damage. Shipwrecks in shallow water near busy shipping lanes are often demolished or removed to reduce the danger to other vessels. On charts, some wreck symbols have a line under the symbol with a depth mark, which indicates the water depth above the wreck.

=== Depth, tide and weather ===
On the seabed, wrecks are slowly broken up by the forces of wave action caused by the weather and currents caused by tides. More highly oxygenated water promotes corrosion, which reduces the strength of ferrous structural materials of the ship. Deeper wrecks may be protected by less exposure to water movement and by lower levels of oxygen in water.

=== Temperature ===
Extreme cold (such as in a glacial-fed lake, Arctic waters, the Great Lakes, etc.) slows the degradation of ship materials, such as in the case of the SS Edmund Fitzgerald. Decay, corrosion and marine encrustation are inhibited in cold waters.

== Marine pollution ==
Many modern shipwrecks contribute to marine pollution, mainly as sources of significant oil spills. A 2005 survey of shipwrecks since 1890 found that over 8,500 of the submerged wrecks may still contain oil. Oil spills can have devastating effects on marine and coastal environments as well as fisheries. In addition to being toxic to marine life, polycyclic aromatic hydrocarbons (PAHs), found in crude oil, are very difficult to clean up, and last for years in the sediment and marine environment.

Shipwreck pollution may also originate with a ship's cargo or munitions, such as unexploded ordnance or chemical weapons canisters. German trawler V 1302 John Mahn, sunk in the North Sea in 1942, has multiple unexploded depth charges on board which render the wreck hazardous. Samples taken from the wreck and nearby sediment show the presence of heavy metals like nickel and copper, polycyclic aromatic hydrocarbons, arsenic and explosive compounds, which have changed the local microbial ecology.

== Natural deterioration process ==
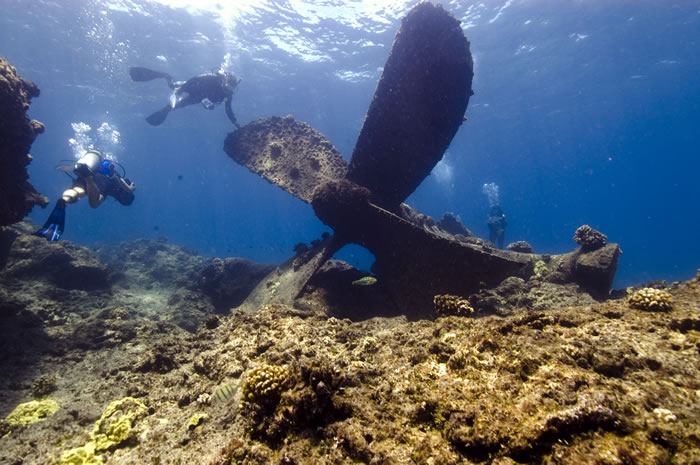
Propeller amongst corals

Iron and steel wrecks are subject to corrosion, which is most rapid in warm shallow sea water where the salinity induces galvanic corrosion, oxygen content is high and water movement replenishes the oxygen rapidly. In deeper water and in still water the corrosion rates can be greatly reduced. Corrosion rates of iron and steel are also reduced when concretions, solid layers of rust, or layers of marine organisms separate the metal from the ambient water, and encourage the development of a layer of relatively stable black oxide in the hypoxic layers.

== Value ==
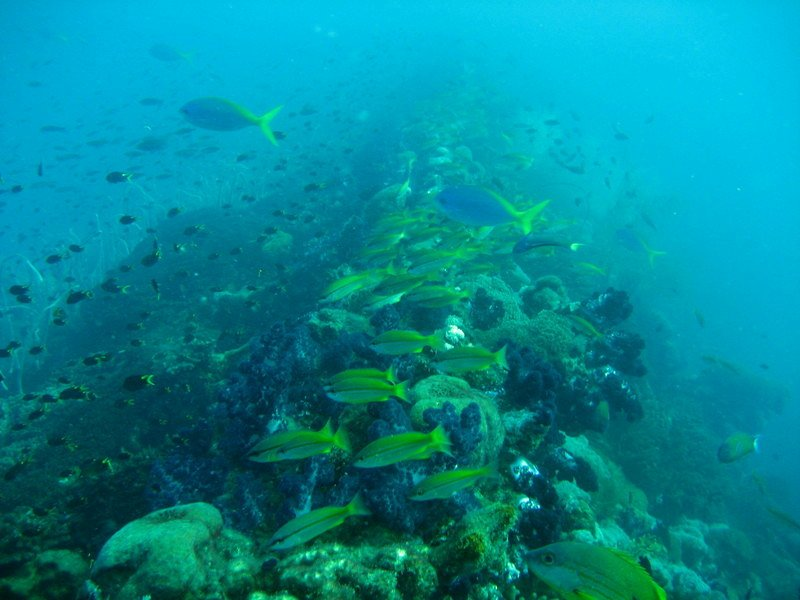
Fish swimming around the wreck of the SS Yongala

A shipwreck may have value in several forms:

- Cultural heritage, shipwrecks may be of cultural and historical due to several factors, for example folklore relating to the sinking of the ship, or legends of cargo on board the ship (usually something valuable or culturally significant) For example you have the Belitung shipwreck which is the wreck of an Arabian dhow that sank around 830 AD which provided 2 main discoveries of cultural significance, first the "Tang treasure" the largest discovery of Tang dynasty artifacts outside of China, and lastly the dhow itself which gave new historical insight into trade relations between the middle east and china during that time period.
- Recreational diving and other tourism attraction, several famous shipwrecks around the world serve as tourist sites. A prominent example is the wreck of the SS Yongala which was a passenger steamship that was sunk by a cyclone off the coast of Queensland Australia where it was subsequently colonised by coral reefs and the diverse marine life that comes with it. The wreck now serves as a popular tourist attraction for experienced divers.
- Scientific, educational and monetary values
- Artificial reefs
- Monetary value of salvageable cargo and components

== Salvage ==
Often, attempts are made to salvage shipwrecks, particularly those recently wrecked, to recover the whole or part of the ship, its cargo, or its equipment. An example was the salvage of the scuttled German High Seas Fleet at Scapa Flow in the 1920s and 1930s. The unauthorized salvage of wrecks is called wrecking.

=== Legal aspects ===
Shipwreck law determines important legal questions regarding wrecks, perhaps the most important question being the question of ownership. Legally wrecks are divided into wreccum maris (material washed ashore after a shipwreck) and adventurae maris (material still at sea), which are treated differently by some, but not all, legal systems.

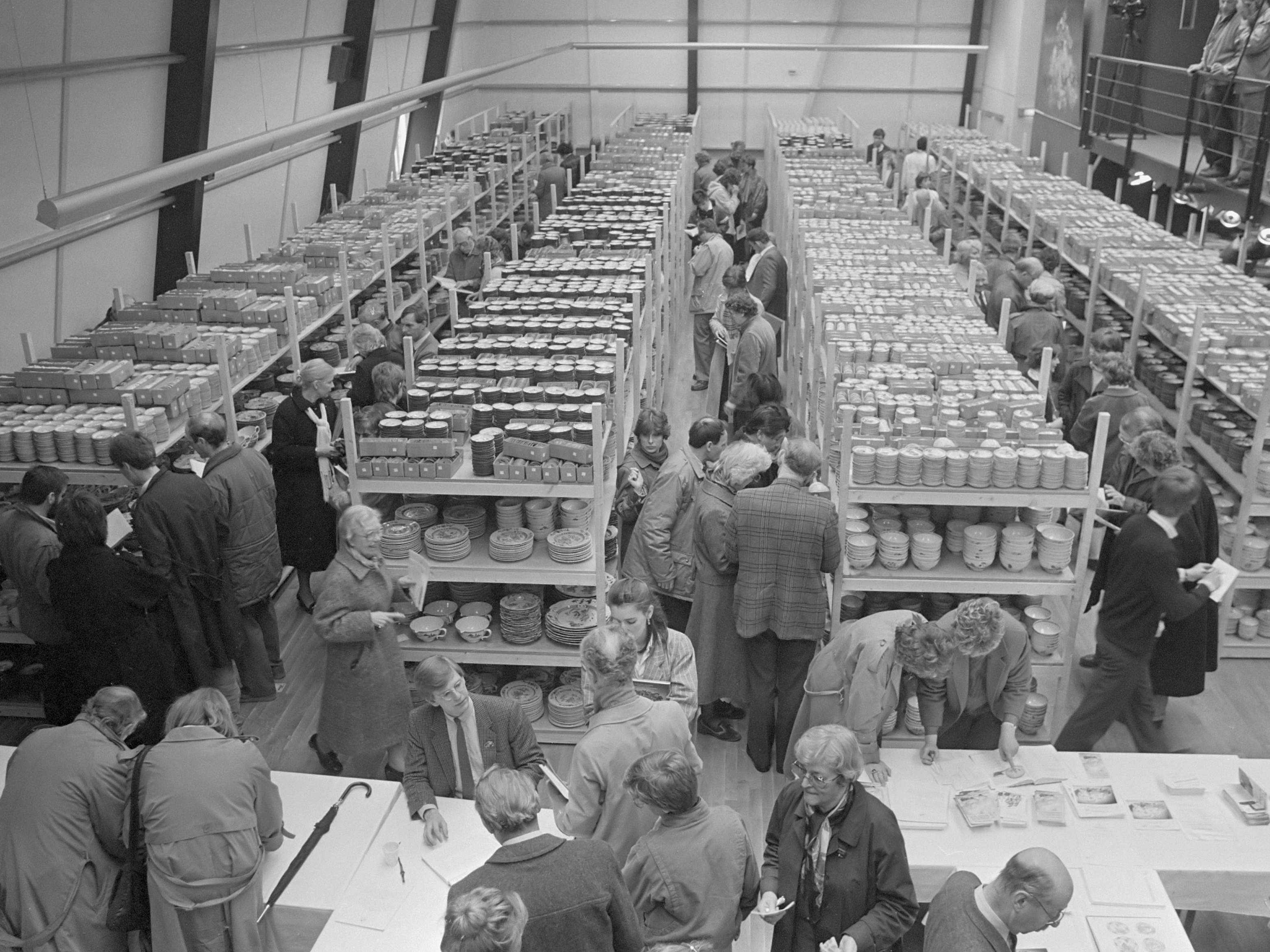
Viewing at Christie's auction in Amsterdam for the cargo of the Dutch East India Company (VOC) ship Geldermalsen (1747)

Wrecks are often considered separately from their cargo. For example, in the British case of Lusitania [1986] QB 384 it was accepted that the remains of the vessel itself were owned by the insurance underwriters who had paid out on the vessel as a total loss by virtue of the law of subrogation (who subsequently sold their rights), but that the property aboard the wreck still belonged to its original owners or their heirs.

Military wrecks, however, remain under the jurisdiction—and hence protection—of the government that lost the ship or that government's successor. For this reason, a German U-boat from World War II still technically belongs to the German government, although Nazi Germany (the government at the time) is long-defunct. Many military wrecks are also protected by virtue of being war graves.

However, many legal systems allow the rights of salvors to override the rights of the original owners of a wrecked ship or its cargo. As a general rule, non-historic civilian shipwrecks are considered fair game for salvage. Under international maritime law, for shipwrecks of a certain age, the original owner may have lost all claim to the cargo. Anyone who finds the wreck can then file a salvage claim on it and place a lien on the vessel, and subsequently mount a salvage operation (see Finders, keepers). The State of North Carolina questionably claims "all photographs, video recordings, or other documentary materials of a derelict vessel or shipwreck or its contents, relics, artifacts, or historic materials in the custody of any agency of North Carolina government or its subdivisions" to be its property.

Some countries assert claims to all wrecks within their territorial waters, irrespective of the interest of the original owner or the salvor.

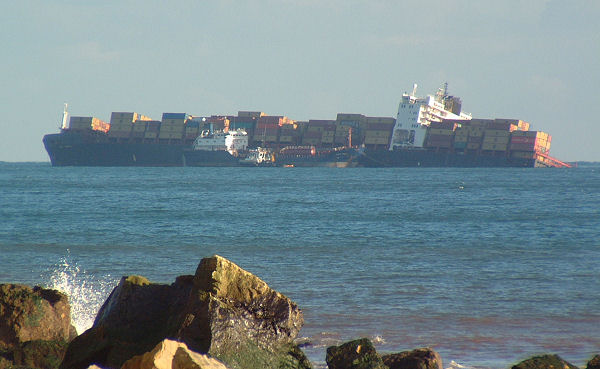
MSC Napoli beached off Branscombe

Some legal systems regard a wreck and its cargo to be abandoned if no attempt is made to salvage them within a certain period of time. English law has usually resisted this notion (encouraged by an extremely large maritime insurance industry, which asserts claims in respect of shipwrecks which it has paid claims on), but it has been accepted to a greater or lesser degree in an Australian case and in a Norwegian case.

The American courts have been inconsistent between states and at federal level. Under Danish law, all shipwrecks over 150 years old belong to the state if no owner can be found. In Spain, wrecks vest in the state if not salvaged within 3 years. In Finland, all property on board shipwrecks over 100 years old vests in the state.

The British Protection of Wrecks Act, enacted to protect historic wrecks, controls access to wrecks such as Cattewater Wreck which can only be visited or investigated under licence. The British Protection of Military Remains Act 1986 also restricts access to wrecks which are sensitive as war graves. The Protection of Military Remains Act in some cases creates a blanket ban on all diving; for other wrecks divers may visit provided they do not touch, interfere with or penetrate the wreck. In the United States, shipwrecks in state waters are regulated by the Abandoned Shipwrecks Act of 1987. This act is much more lenient in allowing more open access to the shipwrecks.

Following the beaching of MSC Napoli, as a result of severe damage incurred during European storm Kyrill, there was confusion in the press and by the authorities about whether people could be prevented from helping themselves to the flotsam which was washed up on the beaches at Branscombe. Many people took advantage of the confusion and helped themselves to the cargo. This included many BMW motorbikes and empty wine casks as well as bags of disposable nappies (diapers). The legal position under the Merchant Shipping Act 1995 is that any such finds and recovery must be reported within 28 days to the Receiver of Wreck. Failure to do so is an offence under the Merchant Shipping Act and can result in a criminal record for theft by finding. After several days, the police and Receiver of Wreck, in conjunction with the landowner and the contracted salvors, established a cordon to prevent access to the beach. A similar situation occurred after the wreck of Cita in 1997.

Historic wrecks (often but not always defined as being more than 50 years of age) are often protected from pillaging and looting through national laws protecting cultural heritage. Internationally they may be protected by a State ratifying the Unesco Convention on the Protection of the Underwater Cultural Heritage. In this case pillaging is not allowed. One such example is Queen Anne's Revenge which is undergoing archaeological recovery by the North Carolina Department of Cultural Resources near Beaufort Inlet, NC.

An important international convention aiming at the protection of underwater cultural heritage (including shipwrecks) is the Convention on the Protection of the Underwater Cultural Heritage. The 2001 UNESCO Convention on the Protection of the Underwater Cultural Heritage represents the international community's response to the increasing looting and destruction of underwater cultural heritage. It forms part of a group of UNESCO standard setting instruments regarding the domain of cultural heritage, encompassing seven conventions adopted by UNESCO Member States, which constitute a coherent and complementary body guaranteeing a complete protection of all forms of cultural heritage.

The UNESCO 2001 Convention is an international treaty aimed exclusively at the protection of underwater cultural heritage and the facilitation of international cooperation in this regard. It does not change sovereignty rights of States or regulate the ownership of wrecks or submerged ruins.

=== Notable salvages ===
In 2011, the most valuable cargo of a sunken shipwreck was identified near the western edge of the Celtic Sea. This World War II era sinking of Gairsoppa led to a treasure almost three miles (16,000 ft; 4,800 m) deep.

A U.S. federal court and a panel from the United States Court of Appeals for the Eleventh Circuit have upheld the Spanish claim to the contents of the ship Nuestra Señora de las Mercedes; Spain took control of the treasure in February 2012. A very small number of coins and effects recovered from the ship were deposited in Gibraltar, because they showed clear signs coherent with an internal explosion on the ship and thus confirmed Spanish claims to the wreck being that of the Nuestra Señora de las Mercedes. They were not returned to Spain until 2013, when a court finally ordered Odyssey Marine to return the missing pieces.

Archaeologist Valerios Stais discovered one of the most notable instruments of time keeping and prediction of celestial events off the coast of the Greek island Antikythera on May 17, 1902. The device, known as the Antikythera Mechanism, is perhaps the earliest example of what would be known as today as an analog computer, and the technology it encompasses predates any other recorded description by hundreds or thousands of years.

== Gallery ==
The Dimitrios shipwreck on a shore near Gytheio, Greece

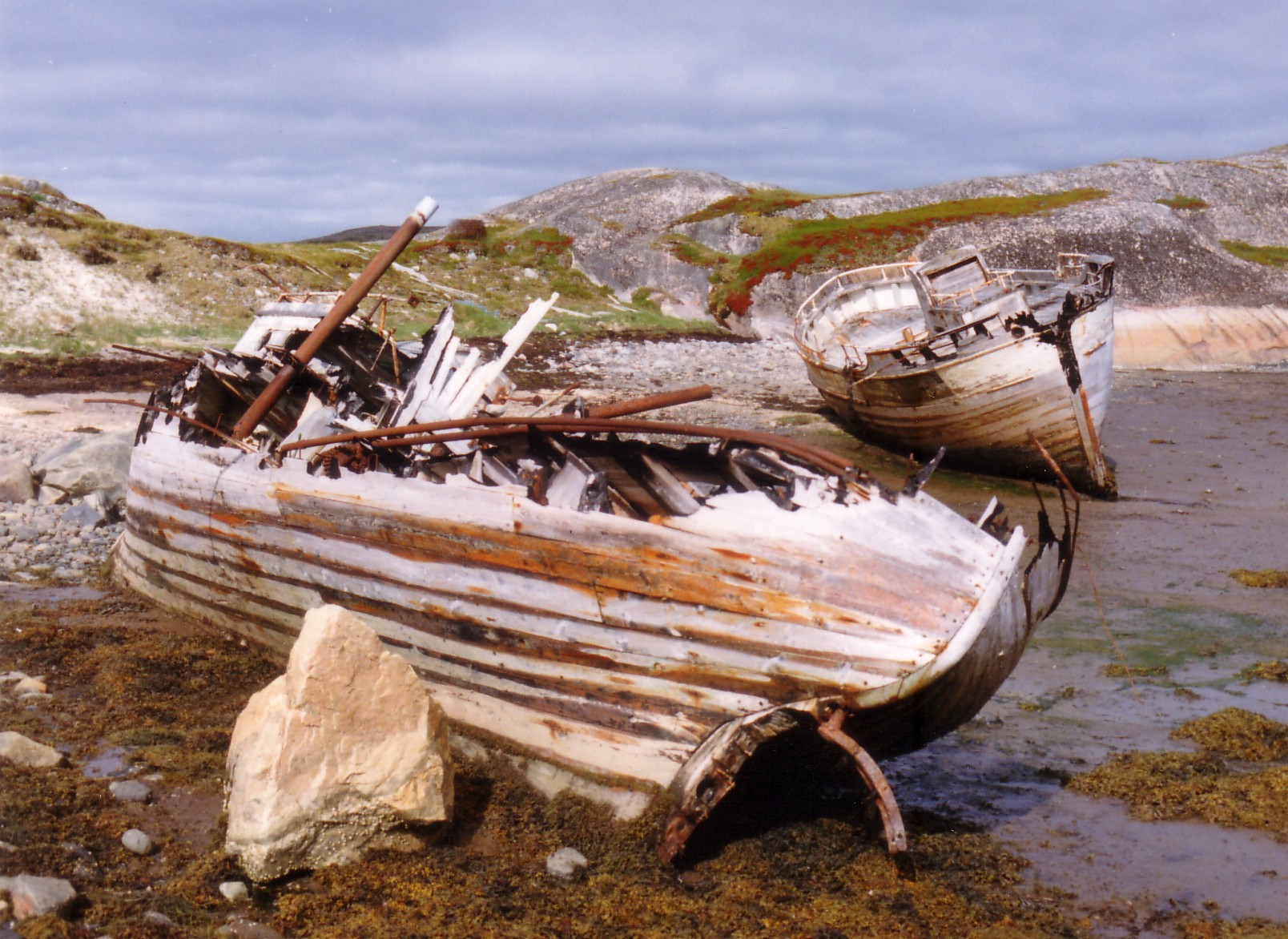
Wrecked fishing boats in Finnmark, North Norway

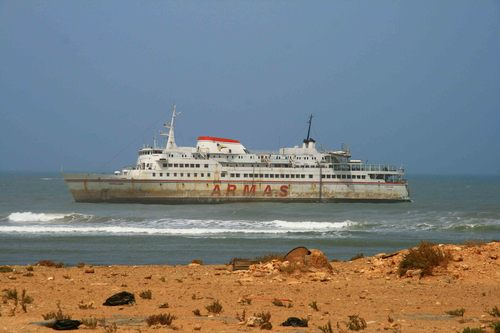
The ferry Assalama wrecked off of Tarfaya, Morocco

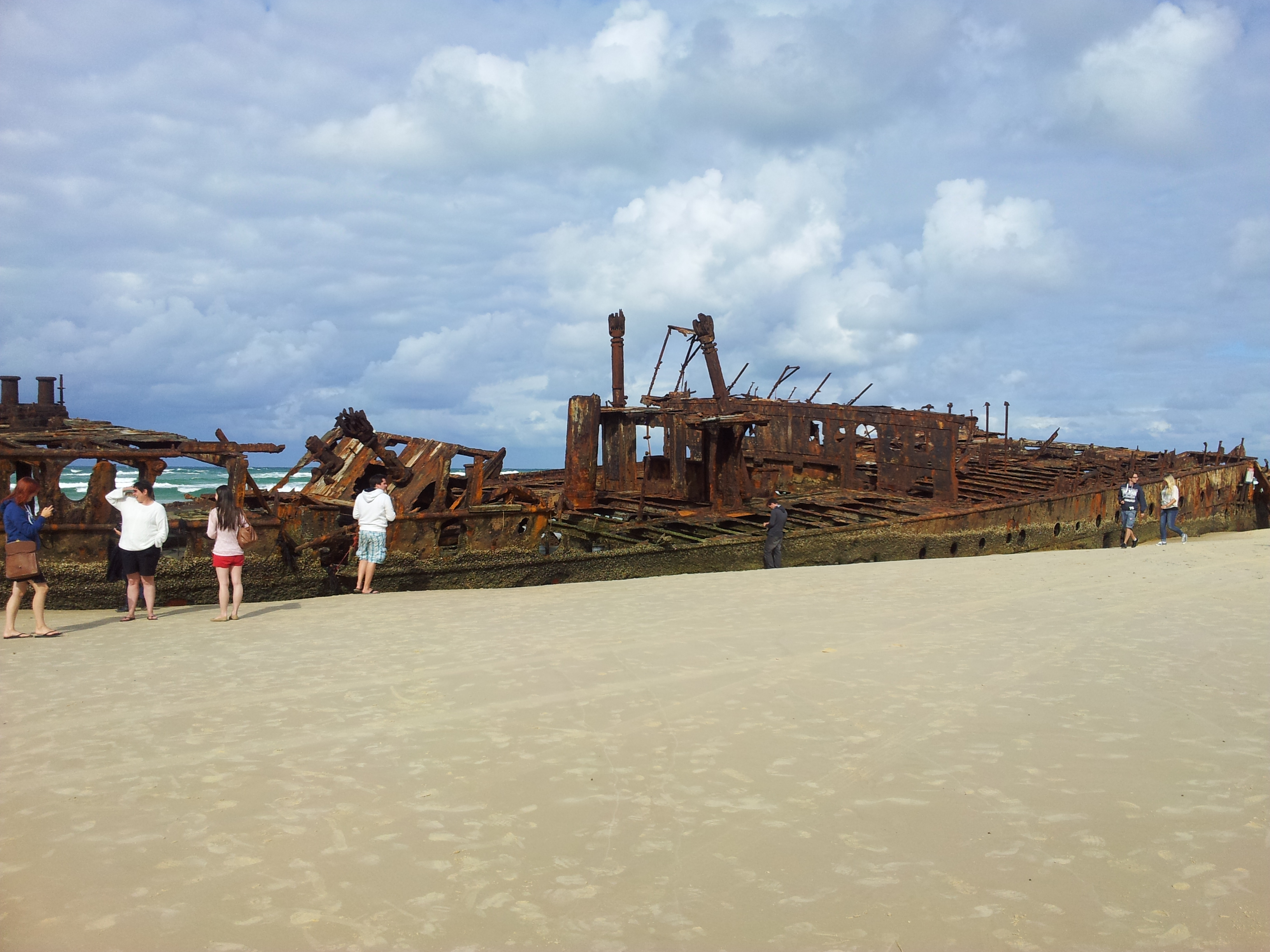
Ship wreck of Maheno, Fraser Island, Australia

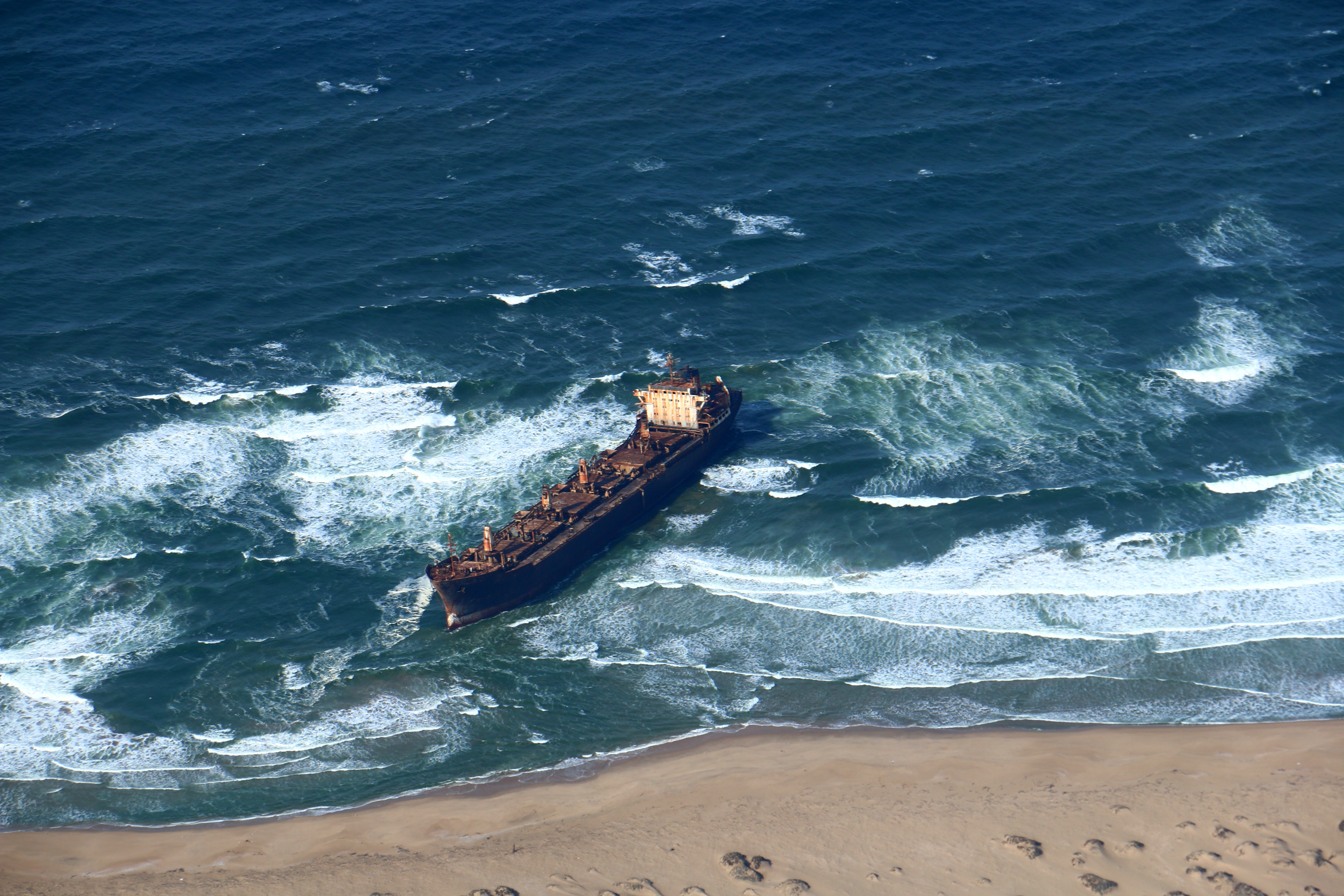
Shipwreck of Frotamerica at the west coast of Namibia

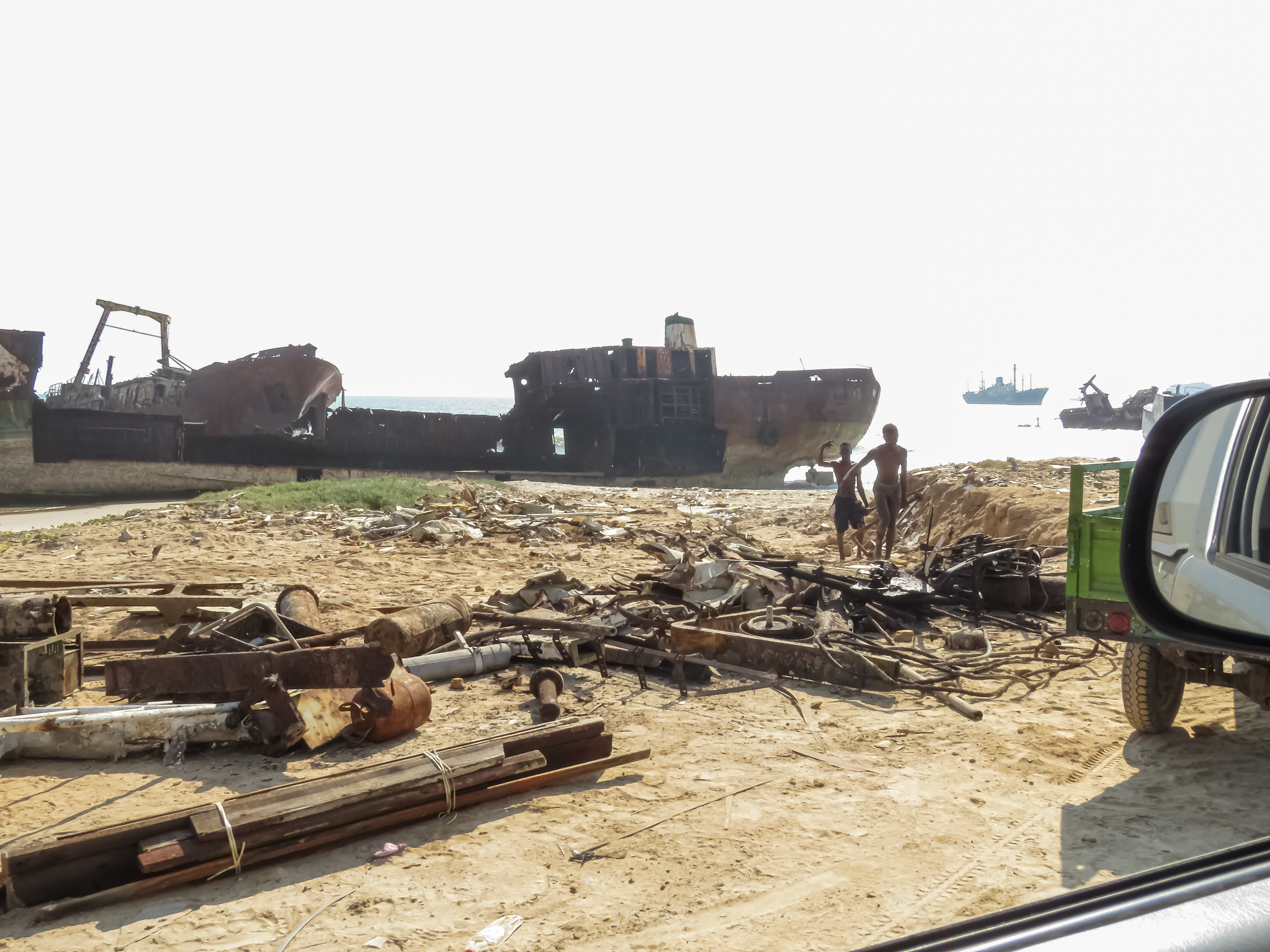
A piece of Shipwreck of Portuguese stranded deep sea-takers 1975 Luanda

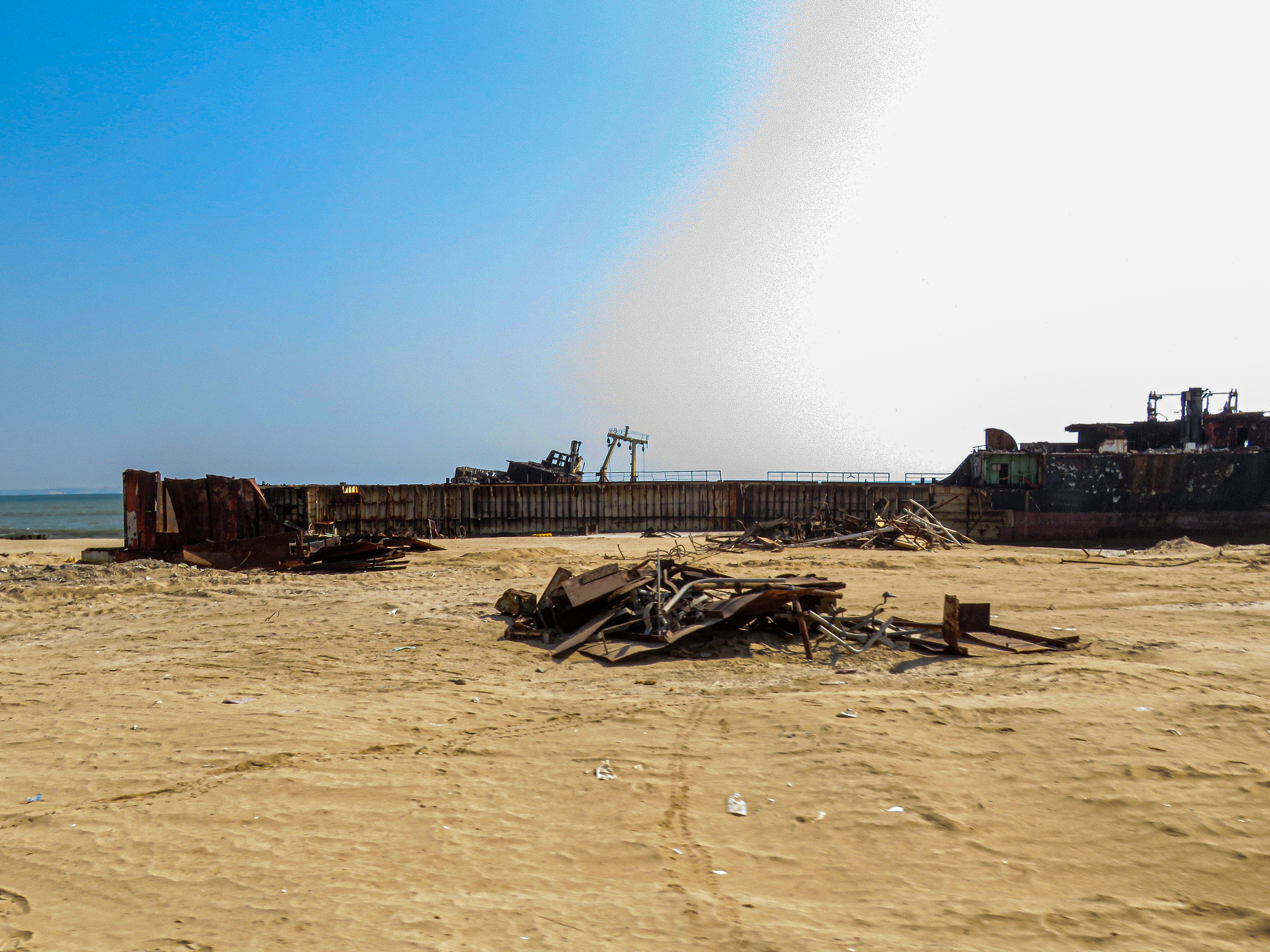
A Shipwreck in Luanda

== See also ==
- Lists of shipwrecks
- Archaeology of shipwrecks – Study of human activity through the analysis of shipwreck artifacts
- Abandoned Shipwrecks Act – US legislation
- Australasian Underwater Cultural Heritage Database – Online database containing data about shipwrecks and other sunken cultural artefacts
- The captain goes down with the ship – Maritime tradition
- Conservation and restoration of shipwreck artifacts
- Flotsam, jetsam, lagan and derelict – Specific kinds of property lost or abandoned at sea
- Historic Shipwrecks Act 1976 – Australian legislation (Superseded by the Underwater Cultural Heritage Act 2018)
- Hulk (ship type) – Ship that is afloat, but not seagoing
- Nairobi International Convention on the Removal of Wrecks – 2007 treaty
- Ship graveyard – Location where scrapped ships are left
- Shipwrecking – Event causing a ship to wreck
- Second Geneva Convention – 1949 treaty
- Sinking ships for wreck diving sites – Scuttling old ships to produce artificial reefs
- Underwater archaeology – Study of human activity via evidence found underwater
- Wreck diving – Recreational diving on wrecks
