= HNoMS Vale (N53) =

Norwegian mine-laying vessel built in 1978

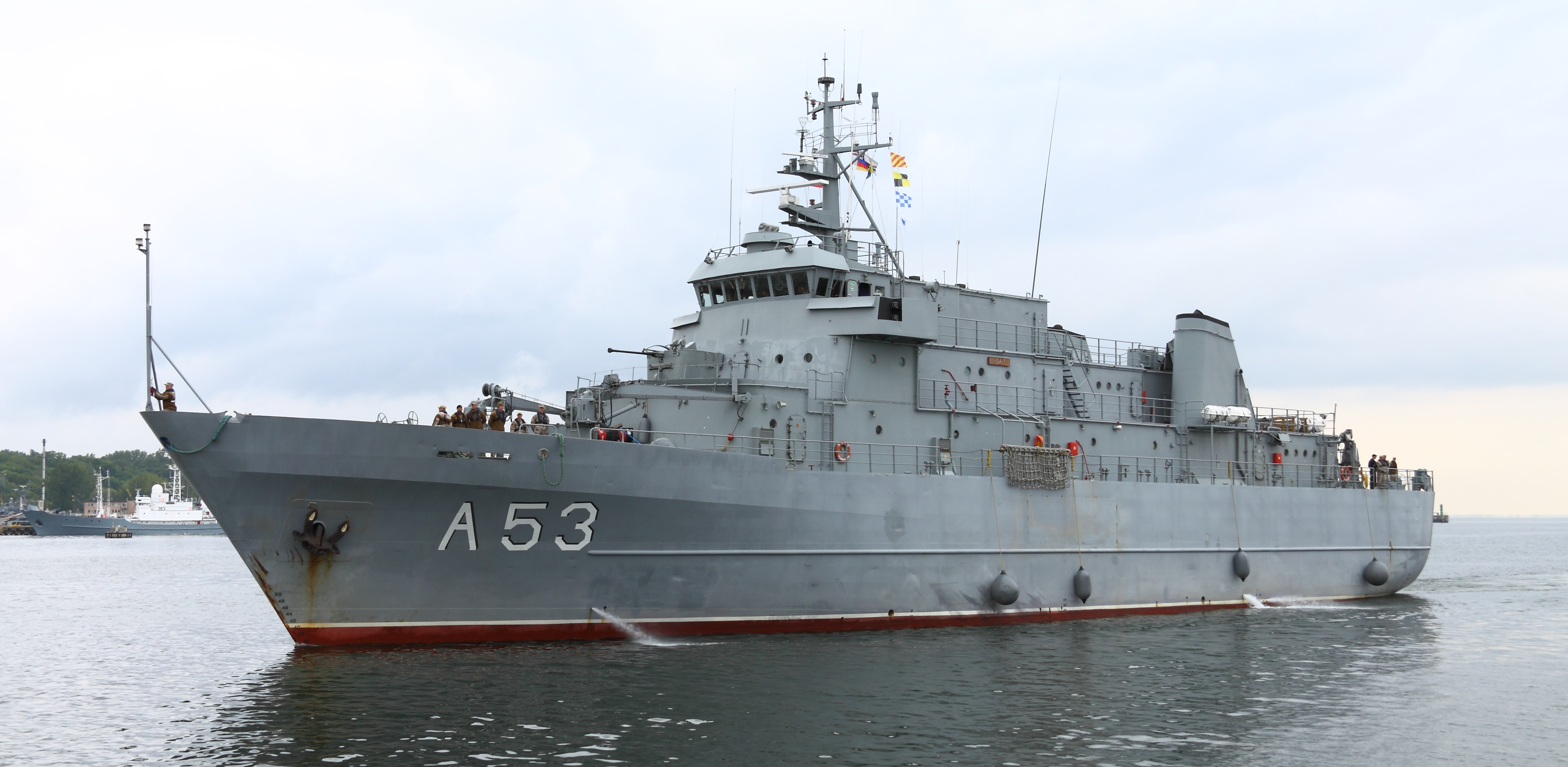
- Latvian Naval Forces minelayer Virsaitis A-53 (2012)

History

Norway
- Name: Vale (N53)
- Namesake: Váli
- Builder: Mjellem & Karlsen Verft, Bergen
- Launched: 1978
- Fate: Donated to Latvia, 2003

Latvia
- Name: Virsaitis (A53)
- Acquired: 2003
- Identification: MMSI number: 275144000; Callsign: YLNS
- Status: In active service as of 2023

General characteristics
- Class & type: Vidar-class coastal minelayer / command and support ship
- Displacement: 1,673 long tons (1,700 t) full load
- Length: 64.8 m (213 ft)
- Beam: 12 m (39 ft)
- Draught: 4 m (13 ft)
- Propulsion: 2 marine diesel engines; 2 shafts; 4,200 hp (3,100 kW)
- Speed: 15 knots (28 km/h; 17 mph)
- Complement: 60
- Armament: 2 × 40 mm (1.6 in) guns; 2 × triple 12.75 in (324 mm) torpedo tubes; 300-400 mines; Mistral SAM launcher

HNoMS Vale (N53) was a Royal Norwegian Navy minelayer. She was built by Mjellem & Karlsen in Bergen in 1978, and named after Odin's son Vale from Norse mythology. Vale was given to the Latvian Navy in 2003. She was renamed Virsaitis, that in translation from Latvian means "Chieftain".

Her sister ship HNoMS Vidar (N52) was sold to Lithuania in 2006.
