= Ribnadzor-class patrol boat =

Class overview
- Name: Rybnadzor class (Project 1326)
- Built: 1974–1979
- In service: 1974–present
- Completed: 4
- Active: 2
- Retired: 2

General characteristics
- Type: Fisheries patrol ship
- Displacement: 139 tons standard; 165 tons full load
- Length: 34.6 m (113 ft 6 in)
- Beam: 6.71 m (22 ft 0 in)
- Draught: 1.63 m (5 ft 4 in)
- Propulsion: 1 × 12DRN23/30 diesel engine
- Speed: 14 knots (26 km/h; 16 mph)

The Ribnadzor-4 class is the NATO reporting name for a class of fisheries patrol boats built in the Soviet Union. The Soviet designation was Project 1326 Bystryy.

== Design ==
The boats were primarily intended for the border protection units tasked with fisheries control. Therefore, the boats did not have armaments when originally commissioned. Officially they were designed as "fishery protection vessels".

== Ships ==
Four ships were built between 1974 and 1979. The builders were the Vympel Shipyard (Rybinsk) and the Yantar Shipyard (Kaliningrad). After the fall of the Soviet Union, the ships were distributed among the successor states.

- Russian Coast Guard: 1 ship
- Ukraine: 1 ship
- Latvian Navy: 2 ships (all retired)
