= Latvian Naval Forces =

- Latvijas Jūras spēki
- Coat of arms of the Latvian Naval Forces
- Active: 10 August 1919 - 17 June 1940; 1991 - present
- Country: Latvia
- Type: Navy
- Role: Naval warfare
- Part of: Latvian National Armed Forces
- Headquarters: Liepāja
- Mottos: Mūs vieno Latvijas svētais vārds! (English: "Holy name of Latvia unites us!")
- Engagements: War of Independence; Latvian Mercantile Marine during World War II

Commanders
- Current commander: Flotilla admiral Māris Polencs

Insignia
- Naval Ensign

- Naval Jack

Latvian Naval Forces (Latvian: Latvijas Jūras spēki) is the naval warfare branch of the National Armed Forces. It is tasked with conducting military, search and rescue operations, mine and explosive sweeping on the Baltic Sea, as well as ecological monitoring activities. The Naval Forces have participated in international NATO/Partnership for Peace operations and various exercises with great success. The main development priorities of the Naval Forces are to expand their activities within the Baltic States’ Ship Squadron BALTRON and to develop a Sea Surveillance System. They pay a great deal of attention to professionally specialized training and English-language teaching.

== History ==
=== Independence to World War II ===
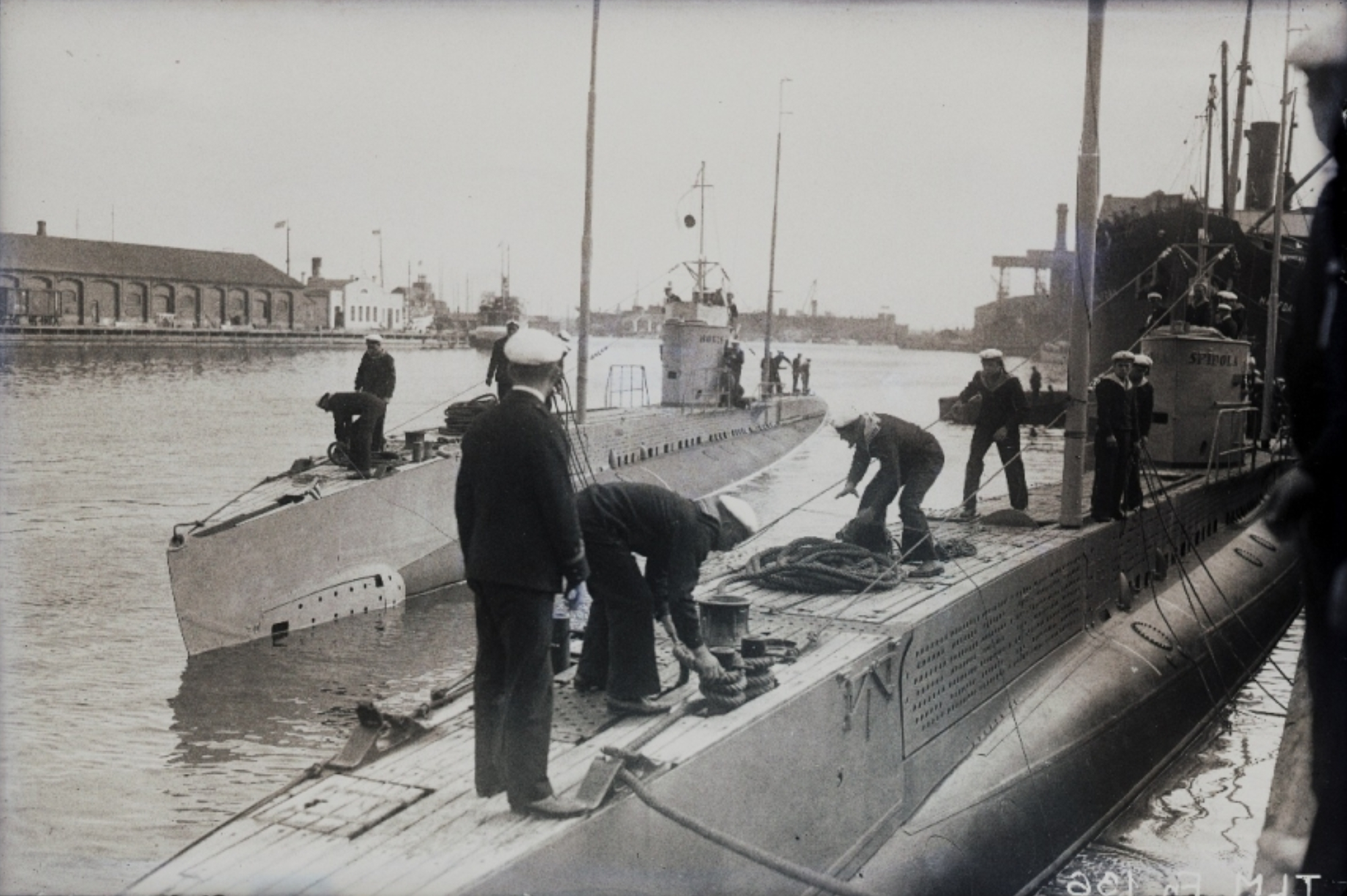
Latvian Ronis-class submarines in Tallinn, 1927

The Latvian Naval Forces were founded on 10 August 1919 with its first ship being the former Imperial German minesweeper SMS M68. Previously, M68 had been sunk by a mine off Riga on October 29 1917. She was raised in 1918 and taken back to Riga for repairs, but was later seized by forces of the Latvian Socialist Soviet Republic in 1919, before being recaptured by Germany. Upon the conclusion of the Latvian War of Independence, and the victory of the Latvian Provisional Government, M68 was formally commissioned into the Latvian Naval Forces as Virsaitis. She would remain the Latvian Navy's only warship until 1926.

In 1926, two new Viesturs-class minesweepers, Viesturs and Imanta were ordered from France and commissioned later that year. The same year, two Ronis-class submarines; Ronis and Spīdola, also ordered from France, were commissioned. A sixth vessel, the former German icebreaker Passat became the submarine tender Varonis.

The six ships consisted of the entirety of the Latvian Naval Forces during its first incarnation, as The Great Depression hindered further expansion. The Navy saw no action during its early existence.

In August 1940, the Soviet Union invaded and occupied Latvia, and thus, seized all six Latvian warships. All were incorporated into the Baltic Fleet. Both submarines retained their names, but Virsaitis was renamed T-297 (her name was restored the following year), Viesturs was renamed T-298, Imanta was renamed T-299, and Varonis was renamed Ural.

All six ships served in World War II in various roles. Ronis and Spīdola were scuttled in Liepāja on June 24 1941 to prevent their capture by German forces. T-299 struck a mine and sank off Saaremaa on July 1 1941. Ural struck a mine and sank on 28 August 1941. Virsaitis took part in the evacuation of the Soviet garrison on the Hanko Peninsula in late 1941. On December 2 1941, she struck a mine and sank off Hanko. T-298 was the only former Latvian warship to survive World War II and was later converted to a survey ship in 1948. Her final fate is unknown.

=== Post-1991 ===
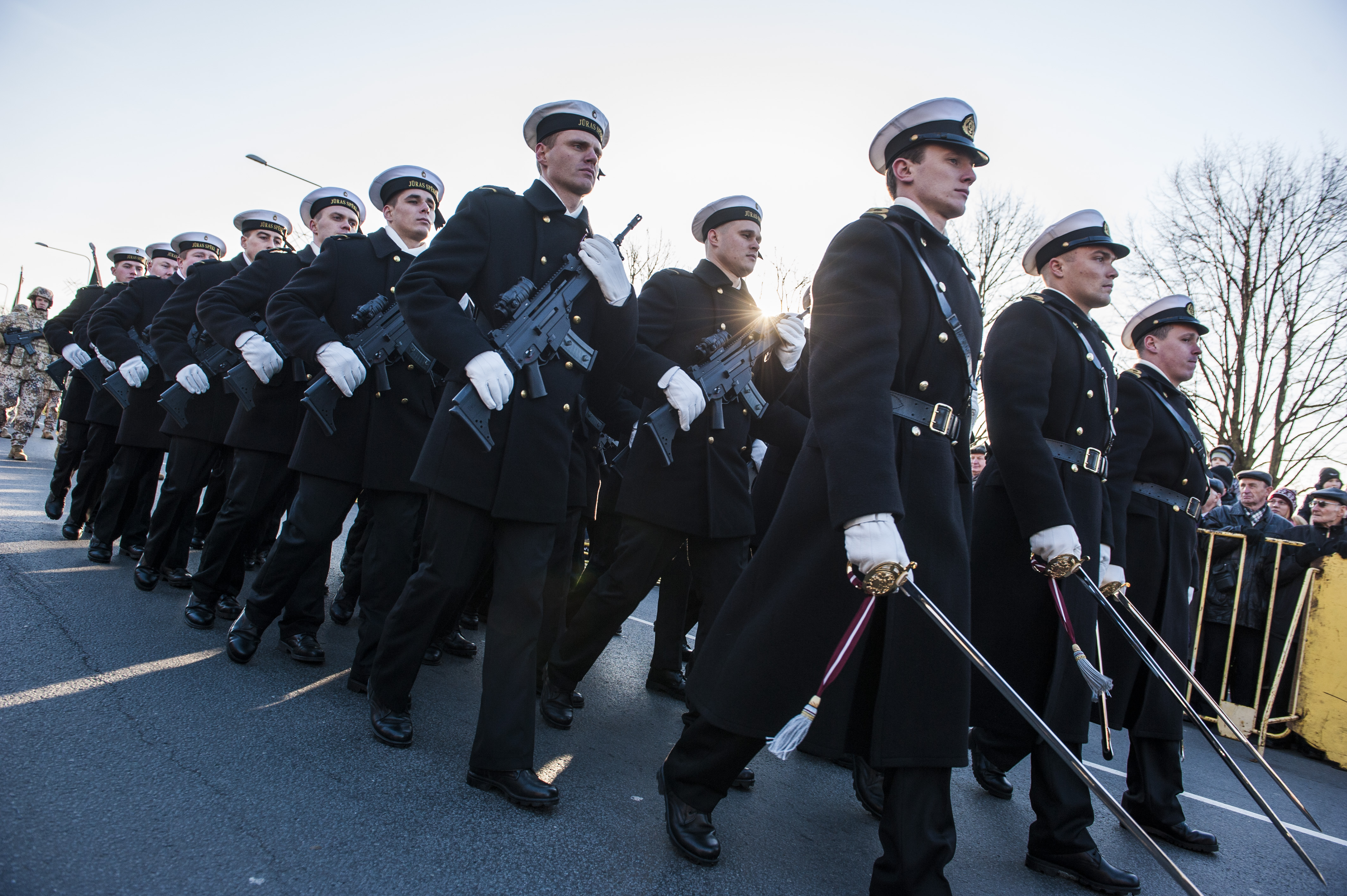
Latvian sailors at the Independence Day parade, 2014

When Latvia regained its independence in 1991, it began recreating the Latvian Naval Forces under the command of Admiral (then Captain) Gaidis Zeibots. In 1994 the Naval Forces were composed of the Southern Region (in Liepāja), the Central Region (in Riga), the Coastal Defense Battalion (in Ventspils) and the Training Center (in Liepāja). The most important naval event of these early days of the re-established Latvian Republic occurred on 11 April 1991 when the Latvian flag was hoisted on the re-established Navy's first ship "Sams" ('Catfish'). This date is now recognized as the rebirth of the Latvian Naval Forces.

In 1999 the Baltic Naval Squadron (BALTRON) was created with ships from the Lithuanian, Latvian and Estonian Navies. Latvian Navy Captain Ilmars Lesinskis, then the Commander of the Southern District, was appointed to serve as the first commander of this multi-national force.

On 1 July 1999 Latvian Naval Forces were reorganized. The present structure was established on the basis of previous regional units – the War Ships Flotilla (HQ is in Liepāja), the Coast Guard Ships Flotilla in Riga (subunits are in Liepāja and Ventspils), the Coastal Defense Battalion in Ventspils (subunits are along the coast of the Baltic Sea and Riga Bay), the Training Center in Liepāja, the Logistic Base in Liepāja (subunits are in Riga and Ventspils).

On 1 July 2004 Latvian Naval Forces were reorganized again and since that time they consist of the Naval Forces Headquarters, Naval Forces Flotilla HQ with subunits and the Coast Guard Service. The new structure organizes personnel training and specialization better than before, as well as shares greater responsibility between commanders.

As part of the program to equip the Naval Forces with modern assets, the first of a new generation of nationally made patrol vessels, made with German assistance, was launched in 2011.

== Mission ==
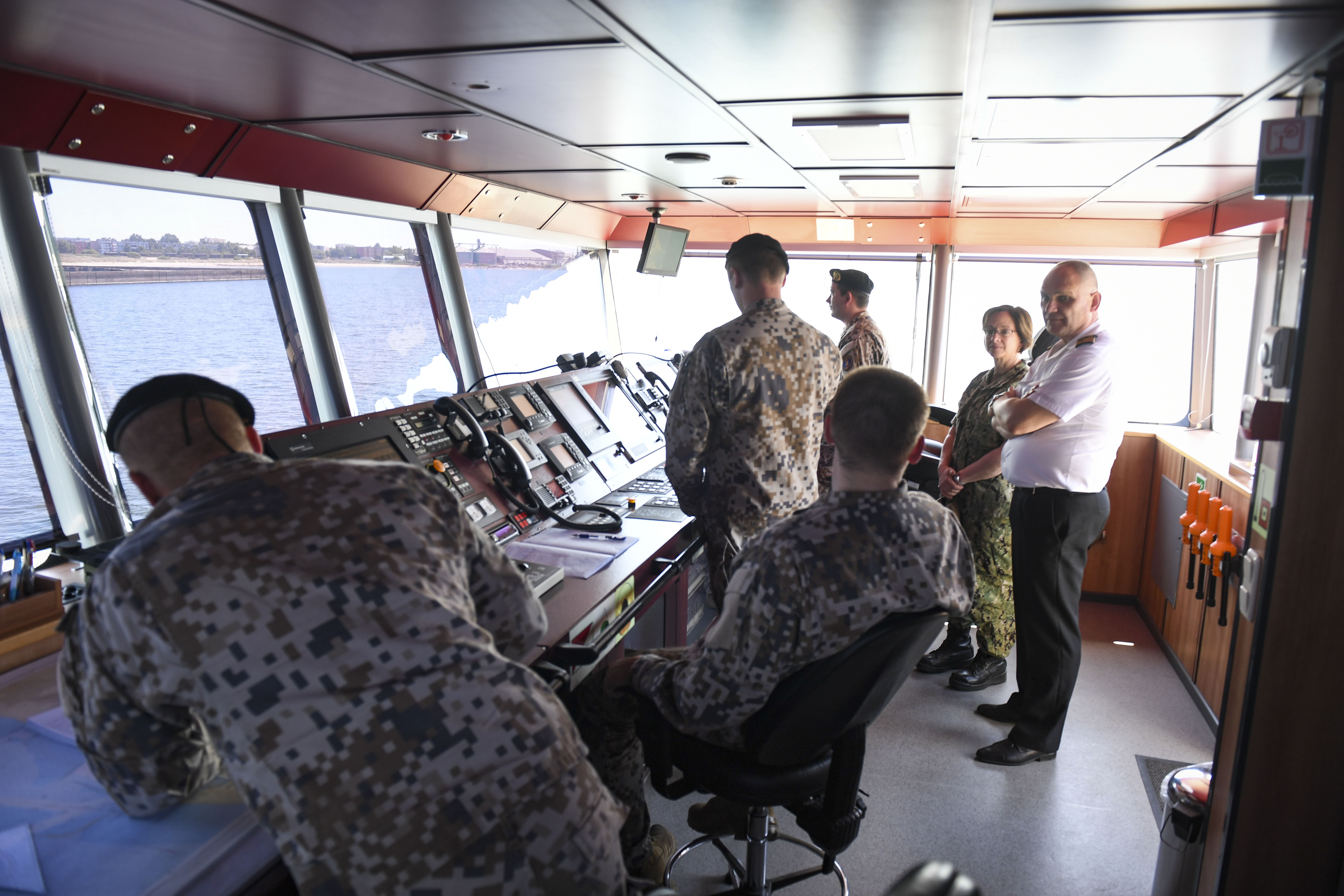
Latvian and U.S. Navy officers on board a Latvian patrol craft during BALTOPS 2018 in Liepāja

The Naval Force provides defense of the national territorial waters, carries out explosive ordnance disposal activities at sea and harbors, co-ordinates and carries out human search and rescue operations at sea within the national responsibility area. Warships of the Republic of Latvia have repeatedly made visits to foreign countries and have supported the visits of foreign warships and naval representatives in Latvia.

The warships of the Latvian Naval Forces Southern Region have participated in numerous international exercises (U.S. BALTOPS, COOPERATIVE JAGUAR, AMBER SEA, OPEN SPIRIT, etc.). These exercises have been conducted to NATO standards, which Latvian ships have successfully met.

The main tasks of Naval Forces are to:

- Ensure the defense of the territorial sea and internal waters of the State (except rivers and lakes);
- Perform a guarding of the coast and control the territorial sea and internal waters, as well as the exclusive economic zone;
- Ensure the readiness of units for mobilization and combat;
- Participate in ecological surveillance and search and rescue operations at sea, as well as take part in elimination of consequences of emergencies occurring at sea;
- Search for explosives at sea and destroy them;
- Secure for the State Border Guard according to the procedures specified by the Cabinet, with the technical means and vessels for the performance of their functions at sea.

== Navy Organization ==
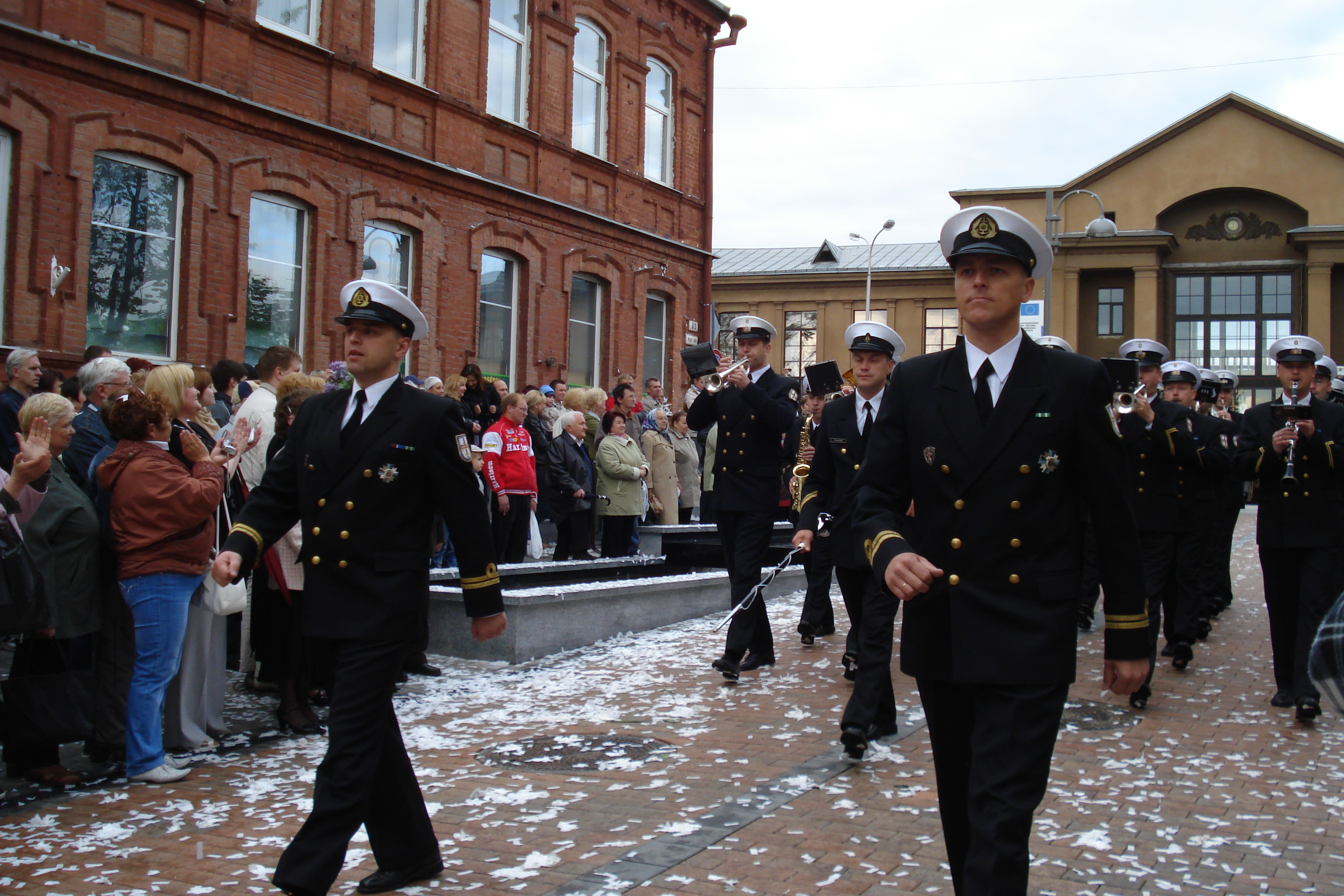
The Latvian Naval Forces Orchestra in Daugavpils, 2009

- Navy
  - Navy Headquarters, in Liepāja
  - Coast Guard, in Riga
    - Maritime Search and Rescue Coordination Center
    - KA-01 Kristaps
    - KA-06 Gaisma
    - KA-07 Ausma
    - KA-08 Saule
    - KA-09 Klints
    - KA-14 Astra
  - Minesweeper Squadron, in Liepāja
    - A-53 Virsaitis
    - M-04 Imanta
    - M-05 Viesturs
    - M-06 Tālivaldis
    - M-07 Visvaldis
    - M-08 Rūsiņš
    - Naval Squadron Diver Team
  - Patrol Boat Squadron, in Riga
    - A-90 Varonis
    - P-05 Skrunda
    - P-06 Cēsis
    - P-07 Viesīte
    - P-08 Jelgava
    - P-09 Rēzekne
  - Specialized Coastal Defense Battalion
  - Technical Support Center, in Liepāja
  - Navy Band, in Liepāja

== Ships in the Naval Forces ==
=== Current ===
Name	Picture	Origin	Class	Type	Built	Entered service (LNF)	Notes
Staff and support (Auxiliary)
A-53 Virsaitis		Norway	Vidar	Minelayer	1978	2003	
A-90 Varonis		Netherlands	Buyskes	Hydrographic survey vessel	1973	2004	
Mine Warfare
M-04 Imanta		Netherlands	Tripartite	Minehunter	1984	2007	
M-05 Viesturs		Netherlands	Tripartite	Minehunter	1984	2007	
M-06 Tālivaldis		Netherlands	Tripartite	Minehunter	1984	2008	
M-07 Visvaldis		Netherlands	Tripartite	Minehunter	1984	2008	
M-08 Rūsiņš		Netherlands	Tripartite	Minehunter	1984	2011	
Patrol
P-05 Skrunda		Germany	Skrunda	Patrol boat	2011	2011	
P-06 Cēsis		Germany	Skrunda	Patrol boat	2011	2011	
P-07 Viesīte		Latvia	Skrunda	Patrol boat	2011	2012	
P-08 Jelgava		Latvia	Skrunda	Patrol boat	2013	2013	
P-09 Rēzekne		Latvia	Skrunda	Patrol boat	2013	2014	
Coast guard
KA-01 Kristaps	KBV class Latvian coastal patrol boat "Kristaps"	Sweden	KBV	Coastal patrol boat	1964	1993	
KA-06 Gaisma	KBV class Latvian coastal patrol boat "Gaisma"	Sweden	KBV	Coastal patrol boat	1963	1994	
KA-07 Ausma	KBV class Latvian coastal patrol boat "Ausma"	Sweden	KBV	Coastal patrol boat	1963	1994	
KA-08 Saule		Sweden	KBV	Coastal patrol boat	1963	1994	
KA-09 Klints		Sweden	KBV	Coastal patrol boat	1963	1994	
KA-14 Astra		Finland	KBV	Coastal patrol boat	1996	2001	

=== Retired ===
Name	Picture	Origin	Class	Type	Built	Entered service (LNF)	Left service (LNF)	Notes
Staff and support (Auxiliary)
A-18 Pērkons		Poland	Goliat	Tugboat	1960	1993	2011	Sold to civilian buyers.
Mine Warfare
M-01 Viesturs		GDR	Kondor II	Minesweeper	1971	1994	2008	Scrapped in 2016.
M-02 Imanta		GDR	Kondor II	Minesweeper	1971	1994	2008	Scrapped in 2013.
M-03 Namejs		FRG	Lindau	Minehunter	1959	1999	2008	Received from Germany in 1999. Handed over to Liepāja Maritime College in 2008.
K/K Viesturs		France	Viesturs	Mine trawler	1926	1926	1940	Built by A et C de la Loire in Nantes. Seized by the Soviet Navy in 1940, scrapped after 1948
K/K Imanta		France	Viesturs	Mine trawler	1926	1926	1940	Built by A et C Augustin Normand in Le Havre. Seized by the Soviet Navy in 1940, sunk 1 July 1941 west of Soela Strait
Patrol
P-03 Linga		Norway	Storm	Patrol boat	1968		2012	Awaiting deconstruction in scrapyard.
P-04 Bulta		Norway	Storm	Patrol boat	1967		2011	Scrapped in 2016
P-01 Zibens		Norway	Storm	Patrol boat	1967		2013	Scrapped in 2016 and sold in January 2024
P-02 Lode		Norway	Storm	Patrol boat	1967		2013	Sold to civilian buyers
Coast guard
KA-02 Spulga		USSR	Ribnadzor class	Coastal patrol boat	1964	1992	2000	Crashed at Swedish coast, scrapped in 2005.
KA-03 Komēta		USSR	Ribnadzor class	Coastal patrol boat	1964	1992	2007	Sold to independent researchers in 2011.
KA-04 Sams		USSR	Selga (project 728 fishing boat) class	Coastal patrol boat	1974	1991	1998	Scrapped in 2009.
Submarines
Ronis		France	Ronis	Coastal submarine	1926	1927	1940	Seized by the Soviet Navy in 1940, scuttled 24 June 1941 in Liepāja
Spīdola		France	Ronis	Coastal submarine	1926	1927	1940	Seized by the Soviet Navy in 1940, scuttled 24 June 1941 in Liepāja
Guardship
K/K Virsaitis		German Empire	M-class	Minesweeper	1917	1921	1940	Former German ship M68. Seized by the Soviet Navy in 1940, sunk 2 December 1941 near Hanko
Depot ship
K/K Varonis		German Empire	Unknown	Submarine tender	1908	1926	1940	Former German ice breaker Passat. Seized by the Soviet Navy in 1940, sunk by a mine 28 August 1941

== Ranks and insignia ==
Officers of the Latvian Navy
NATO code	OF-10	OF-9	OF-8	OF-7	OF-6	OF-5	OF-4	OF-3	OF-2	OF-1
Latvian Naval Forces
Latvian Naval Forces			Viceadmirālis	Kontradmirālis	Flotiles admirālis	Jūras kapteinis	Komandkapteinis	Komandleitnants	Kapteiņleitnants	Virsleitnants	Leitnants

Non-Commissioned Officers of the Latvian Navy
NATO code	OR-9	OR-8	OR-7	OR-6	OR-5	OR-4	OR-3	OR-2	OR-1
Latvian Naval Forces
Latvian Naval Forces	Vecākais virsniekvietnieks	Virsniekvietnieks	Vecākais bocmanis	Bocmanis	Seržants	Kaprālis	Dižmatrozis	Matrozis

== See also ==
- Latvian Mercantile Marine during World War II
