= HNoMS Vidar =

Three ships of the Royal Norwegian Navy have borne the name HNoMS Vidar, after Víðarr – Norse god of vengeance and son of Odin and the giantess Gríðr:

- HNoMS Vidar (1853) was a paddlesteam schooner
- HNoMS Vidar (1878) was a Vale-class Rendel gunboat built for the Royal Norwegian Navy at Karljohansvern Naval Yard in 1878
- HNoMS Vidar (N52) was a minelayer built in 1977, and sold to the Lithuanian Navy in 2006
