= Ronis-class submarine =

Latvian class of submarine

- Scheme of Ronis-class submarine

Class overview
- Name: Ronis class
- Operators: Latvian Naval Forces; Soviet Navy
- Built: 1925–1926
- In service: 1926–1941
- Completed: 2
- Lost: 2

General characteristics
- Type: Diesel/electric-powered coastal submarine
- Displacement: 390 long tons (400 t) surfaced; 514 long tons (522 t) submerged
- Length: 55.0 m (180 ft 5 in)
- Beam: 4.8 m (15 ft 9 in)
- Draught: 3.6 m (11 ft 10 in)
- Propulsion: 2 shafts, 2 Sulzer diesels, 1,300 bhp (970 kW); 2 electric motors 700 shp (520 kW)
- Speed: 14 knots (26 km/h) surfaced; 9 knots (17 km/h) submerged
- Test depth: 160 ft (49 m)
- Complement: 27
- Armament: 6 × 21 in (533 mm) torpedo tubes (2 bow, and 2 × twin external turnable); 1 × 75 mm (3 in) main deck gun; 2 × 7.62 mm machine guns

The Ronis-class submarines were built for the Latvian Navy in France in 1925. They were acquired by the Soviets in 1940 following the annexation of Latvia by the Soviet Union. They were scuttled in Liepāja in June 1941 as the Germans were about to capture the port. The hulls were raised in 1942 and scrapped.

== Design ==
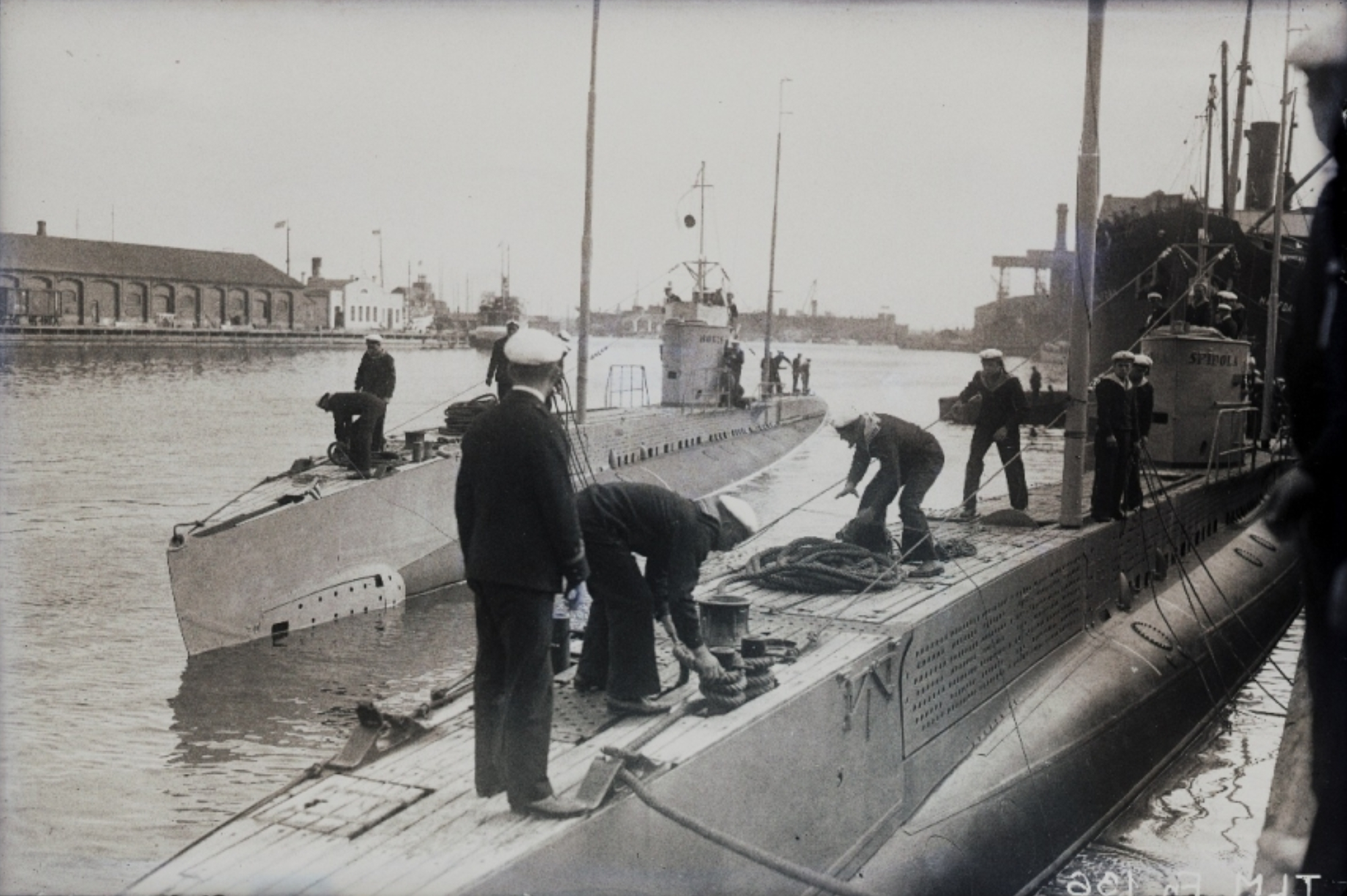
Ronis and Spīdola in the port of Tallinn (1927)

The boats were small coastal submarines built to a French design (Loire-Simonet). Ronis means "seal" in the Latvian language, Spīdola is a character from the Latvian language poem Lāčplēsis. The submarines were 55.0 m (180 ft 5 in) long overall with a beam of 4.8 m (15 ft 9 in) and a draught of 3.6 m (11 ft 10 in). The vessels of the class displaced 390 long tons (400 t) surfaced and 514 long tons (522 t) submerged. The submarines had a dived depth of 160 feet (49 m). They had a complement of 27 officers and ratings.

The Ronis-class submarines were propelled by two shafts driven by two Sulzer diesel engines for travel on the surface, rated at 1,300 brake horsepower (970 kW) and two electric motors 700 shaft horsepower (520 kW) for subsurface movement. The submarines had a maximum speed of 14 knots (26 km/h) surfaced and 9 knots (17 km/h) submerged. They were armed with six 21-inch (533 mm) torpedo tubes with two located in the bow, and four situated in two twin external turnable mounts. The Ronis class was also armed with one 75-millimetre (3 in) main deck gun and two 7.62 mm (0.30 in) machine guns.

== Ships ==
| Ship | Builder | Laid down | Launched | Commissioned | Fate |
|---|---|---|---|---|---|
| Ronis | Ateliers et Chantiers de la Loire, Nantes | 1925 | 1 July 1926 | 1927 | Scuttled 24 June 1941 |
| Spīdola | Ateliers et Chantiers Augustin Normand, Le Havre | 1925 | 6 October 1926 | 1927 | Scuttled 24 June 1941 |

== Service history ==
The two submarines were ordered in 1925 as part of the expansion of the nascent Latvian Navy which was first suggested in 1923. Constructed in France, the submarines were part of the navy's plan to guard Latvia's coastlines. With the onset of the Great Depression, the Latvian Navy comprised just the two submarines and two minesweepers acquired in the 1920s, although Latvia had planned to buy two more submarines of higher tonnage.

In 1940 Latvia was occupied by the Soviet Union and the Latvian Navy was incorporated into the Soviet Navy's Baltic Fleet in August 1940, retaining their original names. During World War II, the Ronis-class submarines participated in operations in the Baltic Sea.

Both submarines were sent to Liepāja in 1941 where they were scheduled to overhaul in July. However, with the Germans approaching the city, the Soviets were forced to blow up and scuttle the Ronis-class submarines on 24 June 1941 to prevent their capture. Liepāja was captured on 29 June by the Germans.
