= Shipwreck on the Norwegian Coast =

Painting by Johan Christian Dahl

- Shipwreck on the Coast of Norway
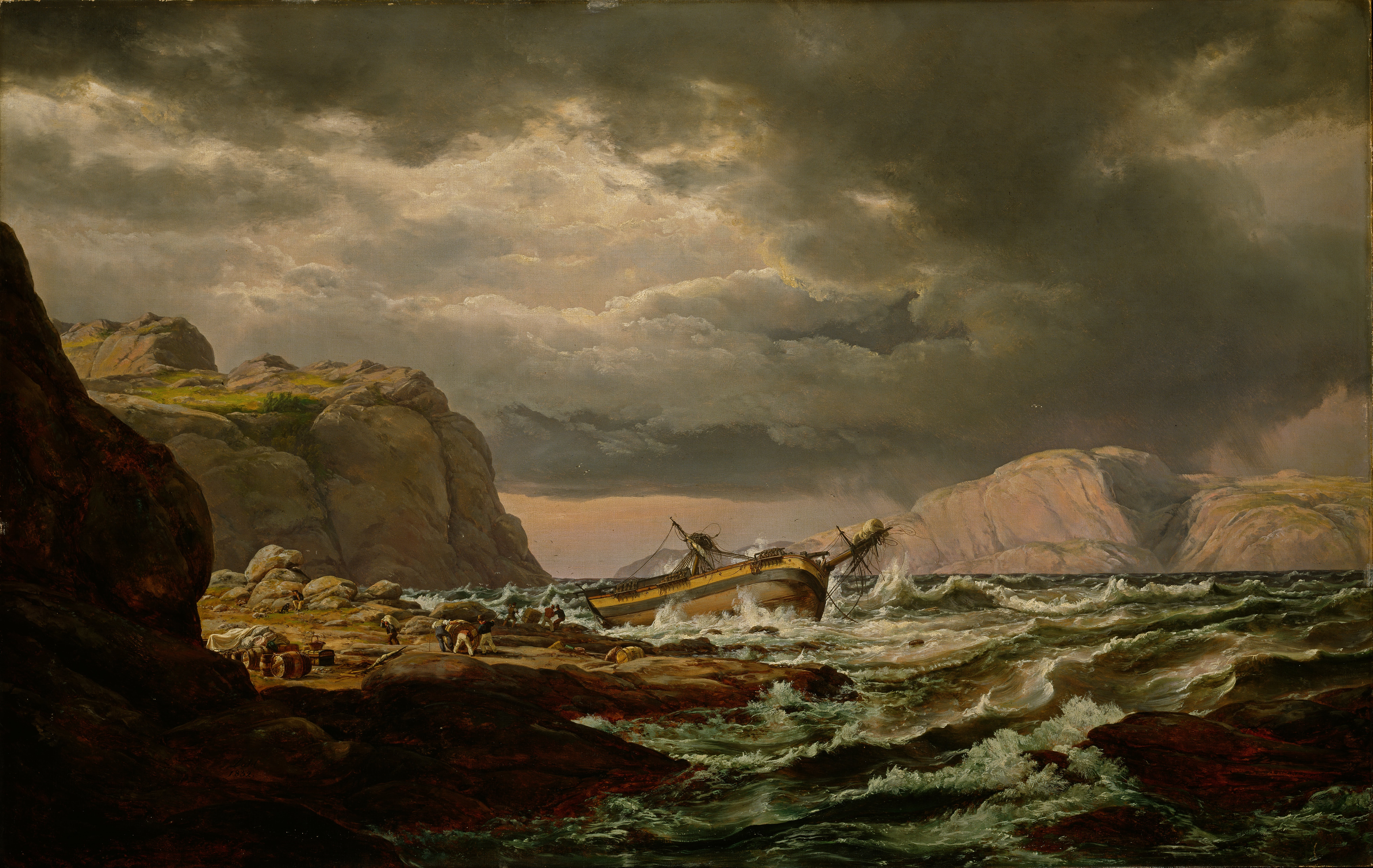
- Artist: Johan Christian Dahl
- Year: 1832
- Medium: oil on canvas
- Movement: Marine painting
- Subject: Coast of Norway
- Location: National Gallery, Oslo

Shipwreck on the Norwegian Coast or Shipwreck on the Coast of Norway (Norwegian - Skibbrudd ved den norske kyst) is an 1832 marine painting by Johan Christian Dahl. It is now in the National Gallery of Norway, to which it was left in 1931 by Louise and Johannes G. Heftye.

Dahl had already painted a first version of the work in 1819, and painted several others in his career, inspired by his five long voyages along the coast of Norway. A smaller variant is in the Bergen Billedgalleri.

== History ==
Shipwrecks were a popular motif in romantic painting and Dahl created a large number of paintings on this theme. Alongside the inherent drama, the motif can also symbolize the vulnerability of human life and dependence on natural forces and higher powers.

Dahl was educated at the Kunstakademiet in Copenhagen (1811–1817), and then moved to Dresden, in Germany, where he spent the rest of his life. In Dresden, he was a close friend and, from 1823, also a neighbor of the great German Romantic artist Caspar David Friedrich, whose paintings After the Storm (1807) may have inspired Dahl to paint shipwrecks.

Dahl made the first shipwreck paintings as early as 1819. In 1823–1824 he made three almost identical paintings on this theme. One of these was destroyed in Berlin during World War II, and another is owned today by Lillehammer Art Museum. Dahl, during his time in Germany, devoted himself almost exclusively to landscape painting and painted a large number of Norwegian landscapes despite not having been to Norway for many years. In 1826, Dahl made a longer journey home to Norway, where he traveled from Christiania (now Oslo), via Telemark. Outside Bergen, he witnessed a shipwreck, which he drew on the spot. This trip originated a large number of landscape paintings and during 1829–1832 he painted his most famous shipwreck works. He continued to paint similar motifs long afterwards, for example Hardangervidda (1846).
