= Vidar-class minelayer =

Norwegian-built minelayers

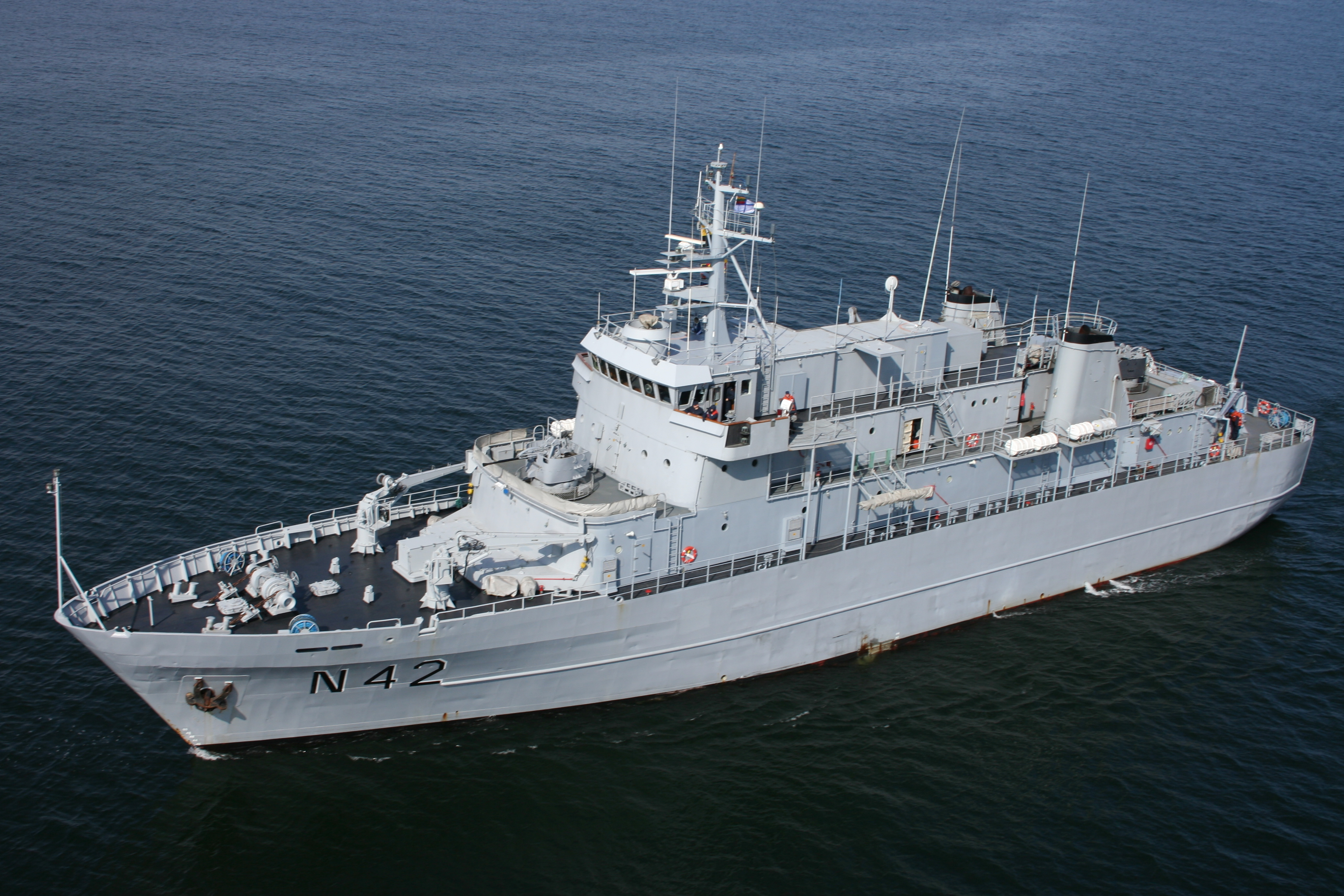
- Vidar-class ship serving in Lithuanian Navy

Class overview
- Name: Vidar class
- Builders: Mjellem and Karlsen
- Operators: Royal Norwegian Navy; Lithuanian Naval Force; Latvian Naval Forces
- Built: 1977–1978
- Completed: 2
- Active: 2

General characteristics as built
- Type: Minelayer
- Displacement: 1,500 t (1,500 long tons) standard; 1,722 t (1,695 long tons) fully loaded
- Length: 64.8 m (212 ft 7 in)
- Beam: 12.0 m (39 ft 4 in)
- Draught: 4.6 m (15 ft 1 in)
- Propulsion: 2 × 4,200 bhp (3,100 kW) Wichmann diesel engines
- Speed: 15 knots (28 km/h; 17 mph)
- Complement: 50
- Armament: 2 × 40 mm Bofors guns; 1 × Mistral surface-to-air missile; 320 Naval mines

The Vidar-class minelayers consists of the two ships, HNoMS Vidar and HNoMS Vale built by Mjellem & Karlsen in Bergen for the Royal Norwegian Navy in 1977 and 1978. Used as multi-role ships, the Vidar class were tasked with minelaying, personnel/cargo transport, fisheries protection, torpedo-recovery ships and as anti-submarine warfare escorts in Norwegian service. In 2003, Vale was transferred to the Latvian Navy via donation and renamed Virsaitis and used as a flagship and tender to patrol craft. In 2006, Vidar was transferred to the Lithuanian Navy and renamed Jotvingis and served as flagship and tender to mine countermeasures craft. Both vessels had their ASW equipment removed upon transfer.

== Description ==
As built the Vidar class were designed primarily as minelayers but with the ability to serve in other functions for the Royal Norwegian Navy. The vessels measured 64.8 metres (212 ft 7 in) long overall and 60.0 m (196 ft 10 in) between perpendiculars with a beam of 12.0 m (39 ft 4 in) and a draught of 4.0 m (13 ft 1 in). The ships had a standard displacement of 1,500 tonnes (1,500 long tons) and 1,722 t (1,695 long tons) fully loaded. (Note: The displacement varies between the sources. Gardiner, Chumbley and Budzbon have the standard displacement as 1,150 t (1,130 long tons) and 1,673 t (1,647 long tons) at full load, while Sharpe gives the full load displacement as 1,673 t (1,647 long tons).) The Vidar class are powered by two Wichmann 7AX diesel engines turning two propellers creating 4,200 brake horsepower (3,100 kW) and giving the minelayers a speed of 15 knots (28 km/h; 17 mph). They have capacity for 247 t (243 long tons; 272 short tons) of fuel and can create 1,000 kW (1,300 hp) of electric power. The ships are equipped with a 425-shaft-horsepower (317 kW) bow thruster.

The Vidar class are armed with two single-mounted 40-millimetre (1.6 in) Bofors guns. For anti-submarine warfare (ASW) they mounted two depth charge racks and two triple 324 mm (12.8 in) Mk 32 ASW torpedo tubes. For minelaying, they carried 320 naval mines on three decks with automatic hoists between the decks feeding three mine launching rails. The mines were loaded via hatches forward and aft which were served by a crane.

The ships were equipped with Decca TM 1226 surface search radar and Simrad SQ3D hull-mounted sonar. They have TVT300 optronic directors installed for the 40 mm guns. They have a complement of 50. At some point during their Norwegian service, the ships were given Mistral surface-to-air missile capability.

== Construction and career ==
Two minelayers of the class were ordered on 11 June 1975. Constructed by Mjellem and Karlsen at their shipyard in Bergen, Norway, Vidar, the name ship of the class was laid down on 1 March 1976 and launched on 18 March 1977. Vale was laid down before Vidar on 1 February 1976, but was launched on 5 August 1977. Vidar was commissioned into the Royal Norwegian Navy on 21 October 1977, followed by Vale on 10 February 1978. Aside from minelaying, the Vidar class were tasked with fisheries protection, ASW escort, personnel/cargo transport and used as torpedo-recovery vessels. Vale was decommissioned by the Royal Norwegian Navy in 2001 and Vidar in 2005.

On 27 January 2003, Vale was transferred to the Latvian Navy via donation and renamed Virsaitis for use as a flagship and tender to patrol craft. Virsaitis retained all of the ship's previous capabilities except ASW, as the depth charges and torpedo tubes were removed along with the Mistral missiles. Vidar was transferred to the Lithuanian Navy on 27 June 2006 and renamed Jotvingis for use as a flagship and tender to mine countermeasures craft. Like Virsaitis, Jotvingis had its ASW capability and Mistral missiles removed upon transfer.
