= HNoMS Vidar (N52) =

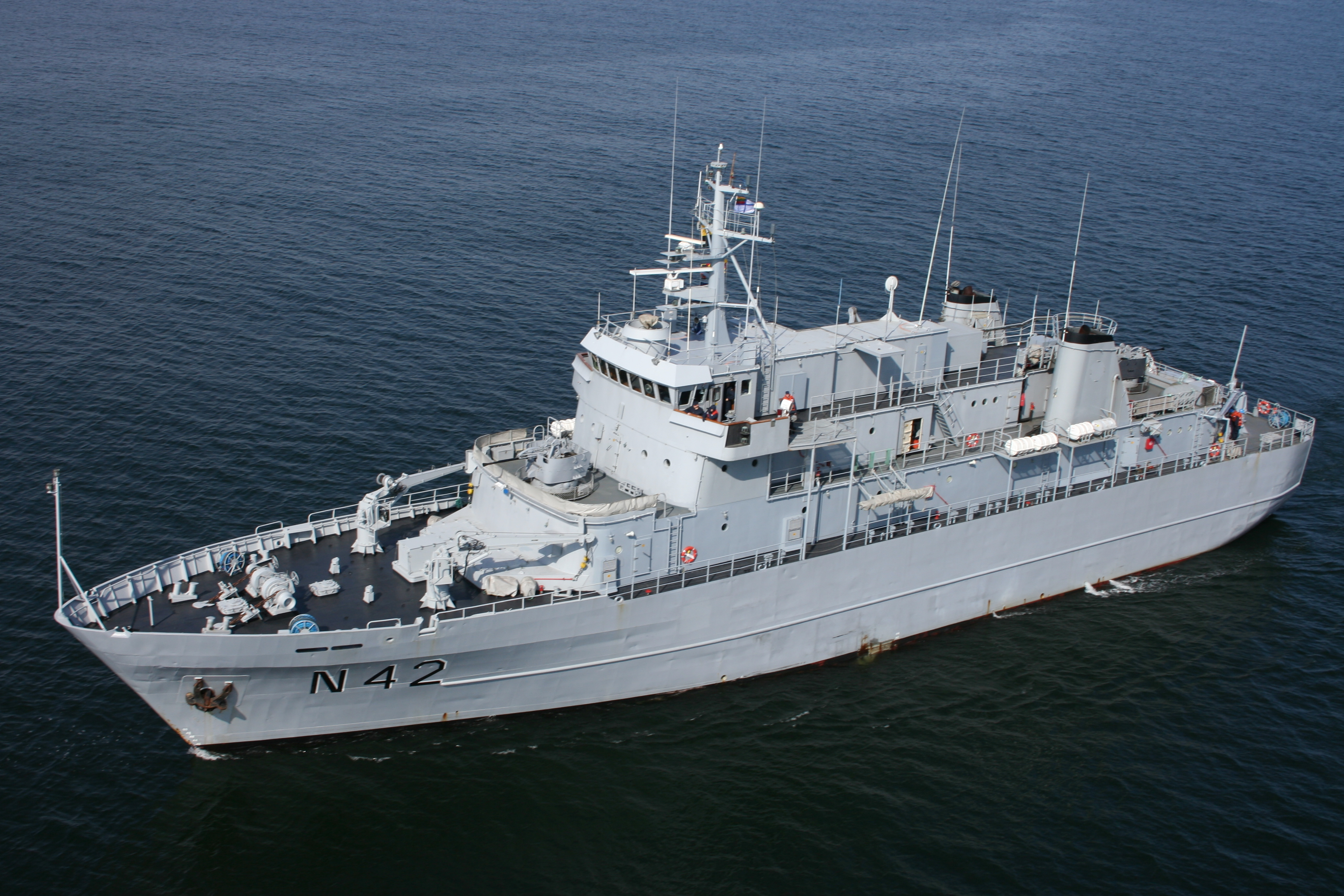
- Lithuanian Naval Force ship N42 Jotvingis (2006)Lithuanian Naval Force ship N42 Jotvingis (2006)

History

Norway
- Name: Vidar (N52)
- Namesake: Víðarr
- Builder: Mjellem & Karlsen Verft, Bergen
- Launched: 1977
- Fate: Sold to Lithuania, 2006

Lithuania
- Name: Jotvingis (N42)
- Acquired: by purchase, 2006
- Identification: MMSI number: 277005000; Callsign: LYPM
- Status: In active service as of 2026

General characteristics
- Class & type: Vidar-class coastal minelayer / command and support ship
- Displacement: 1,673 long tons (1,700 t) full load
- Length: 64.8 m (213 ft)
- Beam: 12 m (39 ft)
- Draught: 4 m (13 ft)
- Propulsion: 2 marine diesel engines; 2 shafts; 4,200 hp (3,100 kW)
- Speed: 15 knots (28 km/h; 17 mph)
- Complement: 60
- Armament: 2 × 40 mm guns; 2 × triple 12.75 in (324 mm) torpedo tubes; 300-400 mines; Mistral SAM launcher

HNoMS Vidar (N52) was a Royal Norwegian Navy minelayer and command vessel. Vidar was built by Mjellem & Karlsen in Bergen in 1977, and named after Odin's son Vidar from Norse mythology. The vessel was the command ship for NATO's "Mine Counter Measures Force North" (MCMFORNORTH) in 2004 and 2005. In 2006 she was sold to Lithuania and given the name N42 Jotvingis. The Lithuanian Navy uses her as a command and support ship.

Her sister ship HNoMS Vale was sold to Latvia in 2003.
