= SMS M68 =

Minesweeper built for the German Empire in WWI

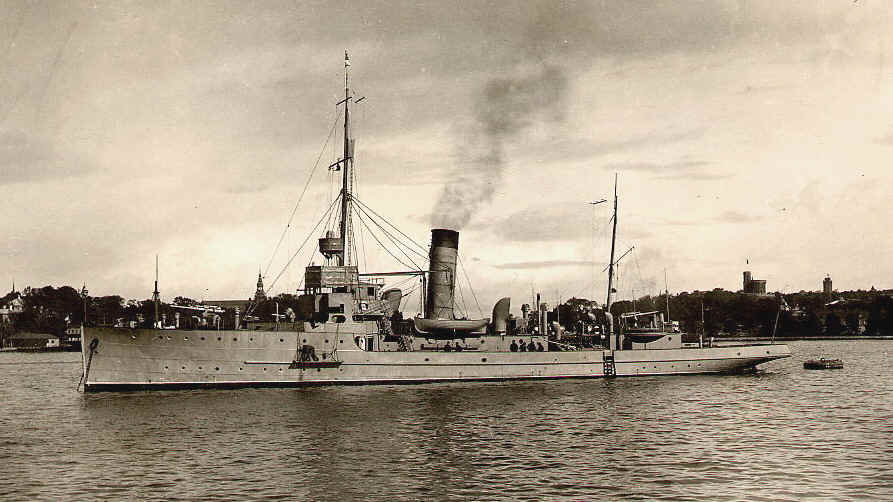
- Virsaitis in Latvian service

History

German Empire
- Name: SMS M68
- Builder: A.G. Neptun, Rostock
- Launched: 25 July 1917
- Commissioned: 6 October 1917
- Fate: Sunk 29 October 1917

History

Latvia
- Name: Virsaitis
- Acquired: Salvaged 1919
- Commissioned: 10 November 1921
- Fate: Seized by USSR August 1940

History

Soviet Union
- Name: T-297
- Fate: Sunk 2 December 1941

General characteristics
- Class & type: M1916 type minesweeper
- Displacement: 553 t (544 long tons) deep load
- Length: 59.30 m (194 ft 7 in) o/a
- Beam: 7.40 m (24 ft 3 in)
- Draught: 2.2–2.3 m (7 ft 3 in – 7 ft 7 in)
- Propulsion: 2 shaft reciprocating steam engines, 2 coal-fired boilers, 1,850 ihp (1,380 kW)
- Speed: 16 knots (30 km/h; 18 mph)
- Range: 2,000 nmi (3,700 km; 2,300 mi) at 14 kn (16 mph; 26 km/h)
- Complement: 40
- Armament: 8.8 cm (3.5 in) SK L/45 naval guns; 30 naval mines

SMS M68 (Note: "SMS" stands for "Seiner Majestät Schiff" (German: His Majesty's Ship)) was a M1916 type minesweeper built for the Imperial German Navy during the First World War. She entered service on 6 October 1917, but was mined and sunk off Latvia on 29 October 1917. The ship was salvaged by Latvia and entered service with the Latvian Navy on 10 November 1921 under the name Virsaitis as its first vessel. She was taken over by the Soviet Navy in August 1940 when the Soviet Union occupied Latvia in August 1940, serving as T-297 and was sunk by a mine on 2 December 1941.

== Design and construction ==
The M1916 Type minesweeper was an improved and slightly enlarged derivative of the M1914 and M1915 Type minesweepers which Germany had built since 1914. They were fleet minesweepers, seaworthy enough to operate in the open sea, and proved to be successful and reliable in service.

M68 was 59.30 m (194 ft 7 in) long overall and 56.00 m (183 ft 9 in) at the waterline, with a beam of 7.40 m (24 ft 3 in) and a draught of 2.2–2.3 m (7 ft 3 in – 7 ft 7 in). The ship had a design displacement of 500 t (490 long tons) and a deep load displacement of 539 t (530 long tons). Two coal-fired water-tube boilers fed steam to two sets of 3-cylinder triple expansion steam engines, rated at 1,850 ihp (1,380 kW), which in turn drove two propeller shafts. Speed was 16 kn (18 mph; 30 km/h). 120 tons of coal was carried, sufficient for a range of 2,000 nmi (2,300 mi; 3,700 km) at 14 kn (16 mph; 26 km/h).

As built, M68 had a main gun armament of two 8.8 cm (3.5 in) SK L/45 naval guns, (Note: SK stood for Schnellfeuerkanone (German: quick-firing gun).) while 30 mines could be carried. Armament in Latvian service was listed as two 2.9 in (74 mm) Canet guns (Note: Possibly ex-Russian 75mm 50 caliber Pattern 1892 guns.) and one 2-pounder (40 mm) gun in 1931. In Soviet service, the ship was armed with two 76.2 mm (3 inch) guns and two 45 mm guns, backed up by four 7.62 mm machine guns, and was rearmed in September 1941 with three 102 mm (4 inch) and two 37 mm guns, backed up with two 12.7 mm machine guns. The ship had a crew of 40 in German service, with a crew of 69 in Latvia service, and 66 in Soviet service.

M68 was laid down early in 1917 at A. G. Neptun's shipyard in Rostock as yard number 382, was launched on 25 July 1917 and was commissioned on 6 October 1917.

== Service ==
=== Germany ===
M68 joined the 3rd Minesweeping half-flotilla of the 2nd Minesweeping Flotilla, operating in the Baltic. Her service with the Imperial German Navy was short, however, as she was sunk after striking a mine off Riga on 29 October 1917.

=== Latvia ===
In 1918, M68 was raised and taken to Riga for repair, but in January 1919 was seized by the forces of the Latvian Socialist Soviet Republic as they gained control of most of the country during the Latvian War of Independence. In May 1919, M68 changed hands again when Riga was captured by German Freikorps, and in July control of Riga passed back to the forces of the Latvian Provisional Government. With repairs complete, the ship was commissioned into the Latvian Navy as Virsaitis on 10 November 1921, serving as a guardship.

In October 1939, Latvia was pressured into signing a Mutual Assistance Treaty with the Soviet Union, permitting the Soviets to base troops on Latvian territory, and in June 1940 the Soviet Union occupied Latvia, with Latvia formally being incorporated into the Soviet Union on 3 August 1940. As a result, the Latvian armed forces, including its Navy, became part of the Soviet armed forces.

=== Soviet Navy ===
As part of this process, Virsaitis joined the Soviet Baltic Fleet on 19 August 1940 as a minesweeper, and was renamed T-297. Germany invaded the Soviet Union on 22 June 1941. T-297, which was redesignated as an escort vessel on 25 July 1941 (returning to the name Virsaitis), was used to defend naval bases and communication routes. From 31 October 1941, the Baltic Fleet carried out a series of convoy operations to evacuate the garrison of the Hanko Peninsula, which the Finns had been forced to lease to the Soviets for use as a naval base following the Winter War between Finland and the Soviet Union, but was now besieged. Virsaitis took part in the fourth evacuation convoy on 24 November 1941 and the final operation, which left Hanko on the evening of 2 December. Virsaitis struck a mine later that day and sank.

== Wreck site ==
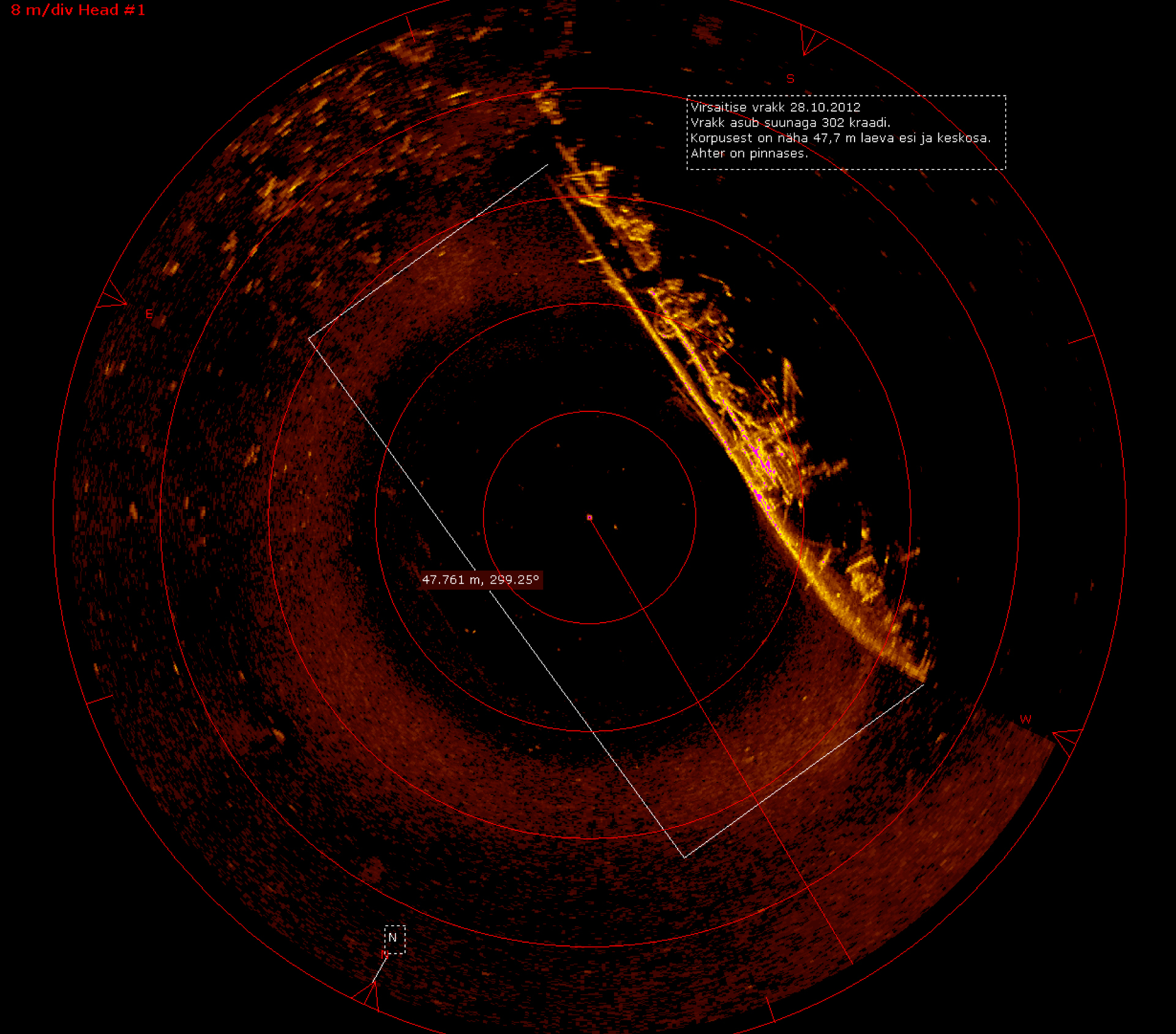
A sonar image of the wreck of Virsaitis

In 2011, the wreck of Virsaitis was found off the coast of Finland near Hanko.

== Bibliography ==
- Bennett, Geoffrey (2002). Freeing the Baltic. Edinburgh: Birlinn. ISBN 1-84341-001-X.
- Berezhnoy, Sergey (1994). Трофеи и репарации ВМФ СССР [Trophies and reparations of the Soviet Navy] (in Russian). Yakutsk: Sakhapoligrafizdat. OCLC 33334505.
- Davies, Norman (1995). "Latvia". In Dear, I. C. B.; Foot, M. R. D. (eds.). The Oxford Companion to World War Two. Oxford University Press. ISBN 0-19-866225-4.
- Gagen, Ernst von (1964). Der Krieg in der Ostsee: Dritter Band: Von Anfang 1916 bis zum kriegsende. Der Krieg zur See: 1914–1918 (in German). Frankfurt, Germany: Verlag von E. S. Mittler und Sohn.
- Gardiner, Robert; Chesneau, Roger, eds. (1980). Conway's All The World's Fighting Ships 1922–1946. London: Conway Maritime Press. ISBN 0-85177-146-7.
- Gardiner, Robert; Gray, Randal, eds. (1985). Conway's All The World's Fighting Ships 1906–1921. London: Conway Maritime Press. ISBN 0-85177-245-5.
- Gröner, Erich; Jung, Dieter; Maass, Martin (1983). Die deutschen Kriegsschiffe 1815–1945: Band 2: Torpedoboote, Zerstörer, Schnellboote, Minensuchboote, Minenräumboote (in German). Koblenz: Bernard & Graef Verlag. ISBN 3-7637-4801-6.
- Lenton, H. T. (1975). German Warships of the Second World War. London: Macdonald and Jane's. ISBN 0-356-04661-3.
- Parkes, Oscar, ed. (1973) [First published 1931 by Sampson Low, Marston]. Jane's Fighting Ships 1931. David & Charles (Publishers) Limited. ISBN 0-7153-5849-9.
- Rohwer, Jürgen; Hümmelchen, Gerhard (1992). Chronology of the War At Sea 1939–1945. London: Greenhill Books. ISBN 1-85367-117-7.
