= LKL Kuršis =

LKL Kuršis is the name of the following ships of the Lithuanian Navy:

- LKL Kuršis (M51), a Lindau-class minesweeper donated to Lithuania in 2001, scrapped in 2017
- LKL Kuršis (M54), ex-HMS Dulverton, a Hunt-class mine countermeasures vessel bought by Lithuania in 2008, in active service
