= List of flagships =

In its strictest sense, a flagship is any naval vessel on which a flag officer is embarked. Some navies have permanent flagships, a designation which may be either functional (ships specifically intended for use by a fleet commander) or ceremonial (a fleet's most prestigious vessel due to its age, size, or some special characteristic).

== Current permanent flagships ==
Fleet	Ship	Class	Notes	References
Algerian National Navy	Kalaat Béni Abbès	Amphibious assault ship		
Argentine Navy	ARA Libertad	Barque		
Royal Australian Navy	HMAS Canberra	Landing helicopter dock	Canberra was designated flagship of the Royal Australian Navy in March 2015.	
Royal Bahamas Defence Force	HMBS Bahamas	Patrol ship		
Royal Bahrain Naval Force	RBNS Sabha	Frigate		
Bangladesh Navy	BNS Bangabandhu	Frigate		
Belgian Naval Component	Leopold I	Frigate		
Brazilian Navy	Atlântico	Amphibious assault ship		
Royal Brunei Navy	KDB Darussalam	Patrol ship		
Royal Canadian Navy (Ceremonial)	HMCS Haida	Destroyer	Haida is a WW II era Tribal Class Destroyer. She was designated flagship of the Royal Canadian Navy in May 2018. She is not an operational ship.	
Canadian Coast Guard	CCGS Louis S. St-Laurent	Icebreaker		
Chilean Navy	Almirante Williams	Frigate		
People's Liberation Army Navy	Liaoning	Aircraft carrier		
Republic of China Navy	ROCS Panshih	Fast combat support ship		
Colombian Navy	ARC Gloria	Barque		
Royal Danish Navy	HDMS Absalon	Frigate		
Dominican Navy	Almirante Didiez Burgos	Patrol ship		
Ecuadorian Navy	BAE Guayas	Barque		
Egyptian Navy	ENS Gamal Abdel Nasser	Amphibious assault ship		
Estonian Navy	EML Admiral Cowan	Minehunter		
Finnish Navy	Hämeenmaa	Minelayer		
French Navy	Charles de Gaulle	Aircraft carrier		
German Navy	Gorch Fock	Barque		
Ghana Navy	GNS Achimota	Fast attack craft		
Hellenic Navy (Ceremonial)	HS Georgios Averof	Cruiser	Georgios Averof is a ceremonial ship in service as the flagship of the Hellenic Navy.	
Guyana Coast Guard	GDFS Essequibo	Minesweeper		
Icelandic Coast Guard	ICGV Þór	Patrol ship		
Indian Navy	INS Vikramaditya	Aircraft carrier		
Indonesian Navy	KRI Raden Eddy Martadinata	Frigate		
Italian Navy	Cavour	Aircraft carrier		
Iraqi Navy	Fateh	Patrol ship		
Japan Maritime Self-Defense Force	JS Izumo	Aircraft carrier		
Kazakh Naval Forces	Kazakhstan	Missile boat		
Latvian Naval Forces	Virsaitis	Minelayer		
Libyan Navy	Al Hani	Frigate	Al Hani was captured by Libyan rebels in 2011 following the death of Muammar Gaddafi and assumed the role as Libya's new flagship.	
Lithuanian Naval Force	Jotvingis	Minelayer		
Maritime Squadron of the Armed Forces of Malta	P61	Patrol ship		
Mexican Navy	ARM Benito Juárez	Frigate		
Montenegrin Navy	Jadran	Barque		
Royal Moroccan Navy	Mohammed VI	Frigate		
Myanmar Navy	UNS Aung Zeya	Frigate		
Royal Netherlands Navy	HNLMS Karel Doorman	Multi-role support ship		
Royal New Zealand Navy	HMNZS Aotearoa	Replenishment ship		
Nigerian Navy	NNS Thunder	High endurance cutter		
Royal Norwegian Navy	HNoMS Maud	Replenishment ship		
Royal Navy of Oman	RNOV Shabab Oman	Barquentine		
Pakistan Navy	PNS Moawin	Replenishment ship		
Paraguayan Navy	ARP Humaitá	Gunboat	ARP Humaitá has remained the Paraguayan flagship since her commissioning in 1931.	
Peruvian Navy	BAP Almirante Grau	Frigate	The frigate BAP Montero was rechristened Almirante Grau following the decommissioning of the cruiser BAP Almirante Grau in 2017. Under Peruvian law, there must always be a ship named for Admiral Miguel Grau Seminario active in the Peruvian Navy, and it must assume the role as the flagship.	
Philippine Navy	BRP Miguel Malvar	Frigate	Commissioned on May 20 2025 and built by HD Hyundai Heavy Industries in Ulsan South Korea, the BRP Miguel Malvar is the Philippine Navy's newest frigate and the most capable in its fleet. She is the successor of the Navy's previous frigate, BRP Jose Rizal. Despite outweighing the Jose Rizal-class frigate by 600 tons, the Miguel Malvar-class was previously designated as corvettes.	
Philippine Coast Guard	BRP Teresa Magbanua	Patrol ship		
Polish Navy (Ceremonial)	ORP Błyskawica	Destroyer	Błyskawica is Poland's ceremonial flagship, with an active duty crew, but no longer has functioning boilers.	
Portuguese Navy	NRP Sagres (Cerimonial)	Barque		
Romanian Naval Forces	Regele Ferdinand	Frigate		
Russian Navy	Admiral Kuznetsov	Aircraft carrier		
Russian Navy (Ceremonial)	Aurora	Cruiser	In 2013, the Russian Navy recommissioned Aurora and made her the ceremonial flagship of the Russian Navy.	
Serbian River Flotilla	Kozara	Command ship		
South African Navy	SAS Amatola	Frigate		
Republic of Korea Navy	ROKS Dokdo	Amphibious assault ship		
Spanish Navy	Juan Carlos I	Amphibious assault ship	Juan Carlos I assumed the role as Spain's flagship following the decommissioning of the Príncipe de Asturias in 2013.	
Sri Lankan Navy	SLNS Sayurala	Patrol ship		
Swedish Royal Navy	HSwMS Carlskrona	Patrol ship		
, Royal Thai Navy	HTMS Chakri Naruebet	Aircraft carrier		
Tongan Maritime Force	Ngahau Koula	Patrol ship		
Turkish Naval Forces	TCG Anadolu	Amphibious assault ship	She is a drone-carrying amphibious assault ship.	
Ukrainian Navy	Hetman Ivan Mazepa	Corvette	Once completed, will assume role as flagship.	
Royal Navy	HMS Prince of Wales	Aircraft carrier	HMS Prince of Wales took over as the Royal Navy's flagship on Wednesday 2 December 2024. Flagship title will rotate between her and HMS Queen Elizabeth every few years.	
Royal Navy (Ceremonial)	HMS Victory	Ship of the line	HMS Victory is the oldest commissioned warship in the world, and although no longer sails, remains the flagship of the First Sea Lord.	
United States Coast Guard	USCGC Eagle	Barque	Eagle is one of only two commissioned sailing vessels in the United States armed forces, the other being the U.S. Navy's USS Constitution.	
National Oceanic and Atmospheric Administration (United States)	NOAAS Ronald H. Brown	Research vessel in NOAA fleet.		
United States Navy (Ceremonial)	USS Constitution	Sailing Frigate	Commissioned in 1797, oldest active warship in the US Navy and afloat in the world. Designated officially as America's Ship of State under the National Defense Authorization Act of 2009.	
National Navy of Uruguay	ROU General Artigas	Replenishment ship		
Bolivarian Navy of Venezuela	ARV Mariscal Sucre	Frigate		

== Former permanent flagships ==
Fleet	Ship	Class	Notes	References
Argentine Navy	ARA Rivadavia	Battleship	1914-1952	
Argentine Navy	ARA Independencia	Aircraft carrier	1958-1969	
Argentine Navy	ARA Veinticinco de Mayo	Aircraft carrier	1969-1997	
Royal Australian Navy	HMAS Australia	Battlecruiser	1913-1921	
Royal Australian Navy	HMAS Sydney	Aircraft carrier	1948-1955	
Royal Australian Navy	HMAS Melbourne	Aircraft carrier	1955-1982	
Belgian Navy	Lieutenant ter zee Victor Billet	Frigate	1947-1958	
Brazilian Navy	Riachuelo	Battleship	1889-1910	
Brazilian Navy	Minas Geraes	Battleship	1910-1951	
Brazilian Navy	Almirante Tamandaré	Cruiser	1951-1976	
Brazilian Navy	Minas Gerais	Aircraft carrier	1976-2001	
Brazilian Navy	São Paulo	Aircraft carrier	2001-2017	
Royal Canadian Navy	HMCS Uganda	Cruiser	1944-1946	
Royal Canadian Navy	HMCS Warrior	Aircraft carrier	1946-1948	
Royal Canadian Navy	HMCS Magnificent	Aircraft carrier	1948-1957	
Royal Canadian Navy	HMCS Bonaventure	Aircraft carrier	1957-1970	
Royal Canadian Navy	HMCS Iroquois	Destroyer	1972-2015	
Royal Canadian Navy	HMCS Athabaskan	Destroyer	2015-2017	
Chilean Navy	Capitán Prat	Battleship	1893-1920	
Chilean Navy	Almirante Latorre	Battleship	1920-1958	
Chilean Navy	O'Higgins	Cruiser	1958-1992	
Chilean Navy	Blanco Encalada	Destroyer	1992-2003	
Imperial Chinese Navy	Dingyuan	Battleship	1885-1895, sunk in action	
Republic of China Navy	CNS Ning Hai	Cruiser	1932-1937, sunk in action	
Republic of China Navy	CNS Chung King	Cruiser	1948-1949, sunk in action	
Dominican Navy	Presidente Trujillo / Mella	Frigate	1946-1998	
Royal Danish Navy	HDMS Niels Juel	Coastal defense ship	1923-1943, sunk in action	
Ethiopian Navy	Ethiopia	Frigate	1962-1991	
Estonian Navy (Ceremonial)	EML Lembit	Submarine	1994-2011	
Estonian Navy	EML Admiral Pitka	Frigate	2000-2013	
Finnish Navy	Väinämöinen	Coastal defense ship	1932-1947	
French Navy	Béarn	Aircraft carrier	1940-1943	
French Navy	Richelieu	Battleship	1943-1946	
French Navy	Arromanches	Aircraft carrier	1946-1961	
French Navy	Clemenceau	Aircraft carrier	1961-1997	
French Navy	Foch	Aircraft carrier	1997-2000	
Royal Hellenic Navy	HS Elli	Cruiser	1951-1965	
Indian Navy	INS Delhi	Cruiser	1948-1961	
Indian Navy	INS Vikrant	Aircraft carrier	1961-1987	
Indian Navy	INS Viraat	Aircraft carrier	1987-2013	
Indonesian Navy	KRI Gadjah Mada	Destroyer	1951-1961	
Indonesian Navy	KRI Irian	Cruiser	1963-1970	
Irish Naval Service	LÉ Eithne	Patrol ship	1984-2022	
Italian Navy	Giuseppe Garibaldi	Cruiser	1961-1969	
Italian Navy	Vittorio Veneto	Cruiser	1969-1985	
Italian Navy	Giuseppe Garibaldi	Aircraft carrier	1985-2008	
Imperial Japanese Navy	Mikasa	Battleship	1904-1905	
Imperial Japanese Navy	Yamato	Battleship	1942-1943, 1944-1945, sunk in action	
Imperial Japanese Navy	Musashi	Battleship	1943-1944, sunk in action	
Latvian Naval Forces	LVNS Virsaitis	Minesweeper	1919-1940	
Lithuanian Navy	LNS Prezidentas Smetona	Minesweeper	1927-1940	
Royal Malaysian Navy	KD Hang Tuah	Frigate	1963-1977	
Royal Malaysian Navy	KD Hang Tuah	Frigate	1977-2018	
Mexican Navy	ARM Guadaloupe	Frigate	1842-1847	
Mexican Navy	ARM Zaragoza	Corvette	1892-1924	
Mexican Navy	ARM Anáhuac	Coastal defense ship	1924-1938	
Royal Netherlands Navy	HNLMS Karel Doorman	Aircraft carrier	1948-1968	
Royal New Zealand Navy	HMNZS Bellona	Cruiser	1946-1956	
Royal New Zealand Navy	HMNZS Canterbury	Multi-role ship	2007-2020	
Royal Norwegian Navy	HNoMS Norge	Coastal defense ship	1900-1940, sunk in action	
Royal Norwegian Navy	HNoMS Stord	Destroyer	1943-1959	
Pakistan Navy	PNS Babur	Cruiser	1956-1985	
Peruvian Navy	BAP Almirante Grau	Cruiser	1906-1958	
Peruvian Navy	BAP Almirante Grau	Cruiser	1959-1973	
Peruvian Navy	BAP Almirante Grau	Cruiser	1973-2017	
Philippine Navy	BRP Ang Pangulo	Presidential yacht	1959-1960, still in service	
Philippine Navy	RPS Rajah Soliman	High-speed transport	1960-1964, lost in accident	
Philippine Navy	BRP Datu Kalantiaw	Destroyer escort	1967-1981, lost in accident	
Philippine Navy	BRP Rajah Lakandula	Destroyer escort	1981-1988	
Philippine Navy	BRP Rajah Humabon	Destroyer escort	1988-2011	
Philippine Navy	BRP Gregorio del Pilar	High endurance cutter	2011-2020, still in service	
Philippine Navy	BRP Jose Rizal	Frigate	2020-2025, still in service	
Portuguese Navy	Vasco da Gama	Ironclad	1876-1935	
Romanian Naval Forces	ROS Mărășești	Destroyer	1985-2001. Still in active service.	
Spanish Navy	Pelayo	Battleship	1888-1914	
Spanish Navy	España	Battleship	1914-1923	
Spanish Republican Navy	Jaime I	Battleship	1933-1937, sunk in action	
Spanish Navy	Canarias	Cruiser	1939-1967	
Spanish Navy	Dédalo	Aircraft carrier	1967-1989	
Spanish Navy	Príncipe de Asturias	Aircraft carrier	1989-2013	
Swedish Royal Navy	HSwMS Gustav V	Coastal defense ship	1939-1945, 1947-1957	
Turkish Naval Forces	TCG Yavuz	Battlecruiser	1914-1950	
Ukrainian Navy	Hetman Sahaidachniy	Frigate	1993-2022. Scuttled during the Russian Invasion of Ukraine. Final Status TBD	
Royal Navy	HMS Iron Duke	Battleship	1914-1917	
Royal Navy	HMS Queen Elizabeth	Battleship	1917-1919	
Royal Navy	HMS Hermes	Aircraft carrier	1982	
Royal Navy	HMS Invincible	Aircraft carrier	1993-2005	
Royal Navy	HMS Ark Royal	Aircraft carrier	2005-2007, 2009-2010	
Royal Navy	HMS Illustrious	Aircraft carrier	2007-2009	
Royal Navy	HMS Albion	Amphibious transport dock	2010-2011, 2018-2021	
Royal Navy	HMS Bulwark	Amphibious transport dock	2011-2015	
Royal Navy	HMS Ocean	Amphibious assault ship	2015-2018	
Royal Navy	HMS Queen Elizabeth	Aircraft carrier	2021-2024	Will rotate out as flagship with HMS Prince of Wales every few years.
National Oceanic and Atmospheric Administration (United States)	NOAAS Oceanographer	Research vessel	Prior to serving as flagship of the NOAA fleet, Oceanographer was flagship of the United States Coast and Geodetic Survey.	
Uruguayan Navy	ROU Uruguay	Frigate	2008-2022	
Royal Yugoslav Navy	KB Dubrovnik	Destroyer leader	1932-1941, captured in action	
Yugoslav Navy	JRM Split	Destroyer leader	1958-1980	

== See also ==
- Royal Navy Fleet Flagship
