= LKL Sūduvis =

LKL Sūduvis is the name of the following ships of the Lithuanian Navy:

- LKL Sūduvis (M52), a Lindau-class minesweeper donated to Lithuania in 1999, now a museum ship
- LKL Sūduvis (M55), ex-HMS Quorn, a Hunt-class mine countermeasures vessel sold to Lithuania in 2020
