= List of equipment of the Armed Forces of the Republic of Kazakhstan =

This is a list of equipment used by the Armed Forces of the Republic of Kazakhstan.

== Current equipment ==
=== Ground forces equipment ===
Individual equipment

Name	Origin	Image	Notes
Helmets and vests
PASGT	United States		Used during multinational exercises with NATO countries.
IBA	United States		Standard variant in use.
MICH	United States		Standard issue.
FAST helmet, Scalable Plate Carrier	United States		Used by the Special Forces.

Small arms

Name	Origin	Caliber	Image	Notes
Pistols
Makarov	Soviet Union	9×18mm Makarov		
Stechkin	USSR	9×18mm Makarov		
Glock 17	Austria	9×19mm Parabellum		Used by the Special Forces.
Rifles and carbines
SKS	Soviet Union	7.62×39mm		Ceremonial usage
AK-105	Russia	5.45×39mm		Standard carbine, replacing the AKS-74U in use.
Assault rifles
AK-47	Soviet Union	7.62×39mm		
AKM	Soviet Union	7.62×39mm		
Beretta ARX160	Italy	7.62×39mm		Used by the Special Forces.
AK-74	Soviet Union	5.45×39mm		Standard assault rifle
Designated marksman rifles
SVD Dragunov	Soviet Union	7.62×54mmR		
Machine guns
RPK	USSR	7.62×39mm		
RPK-74	Soviet Union	5.45×39mm		
PK machine gun	Soviet Union	7.62×54mmR		
NSV	Soviet Union	12.7×108mm		
Grenade launchers
AGS-17	Soviet Union	30mm grenade		
GP-25	Soviet Union	40mm grenade		
Anti-tank weapons
RPG-7	Soviet Union	85mm anti-tank round		
RPG-16	Soviet Union	58.3mm anti-tank round		
RPG-18	Soviet Union	64mm anti-tank round		
RPG-26	USSR	72.5mm anti-tank round		

==== Vehicles ====
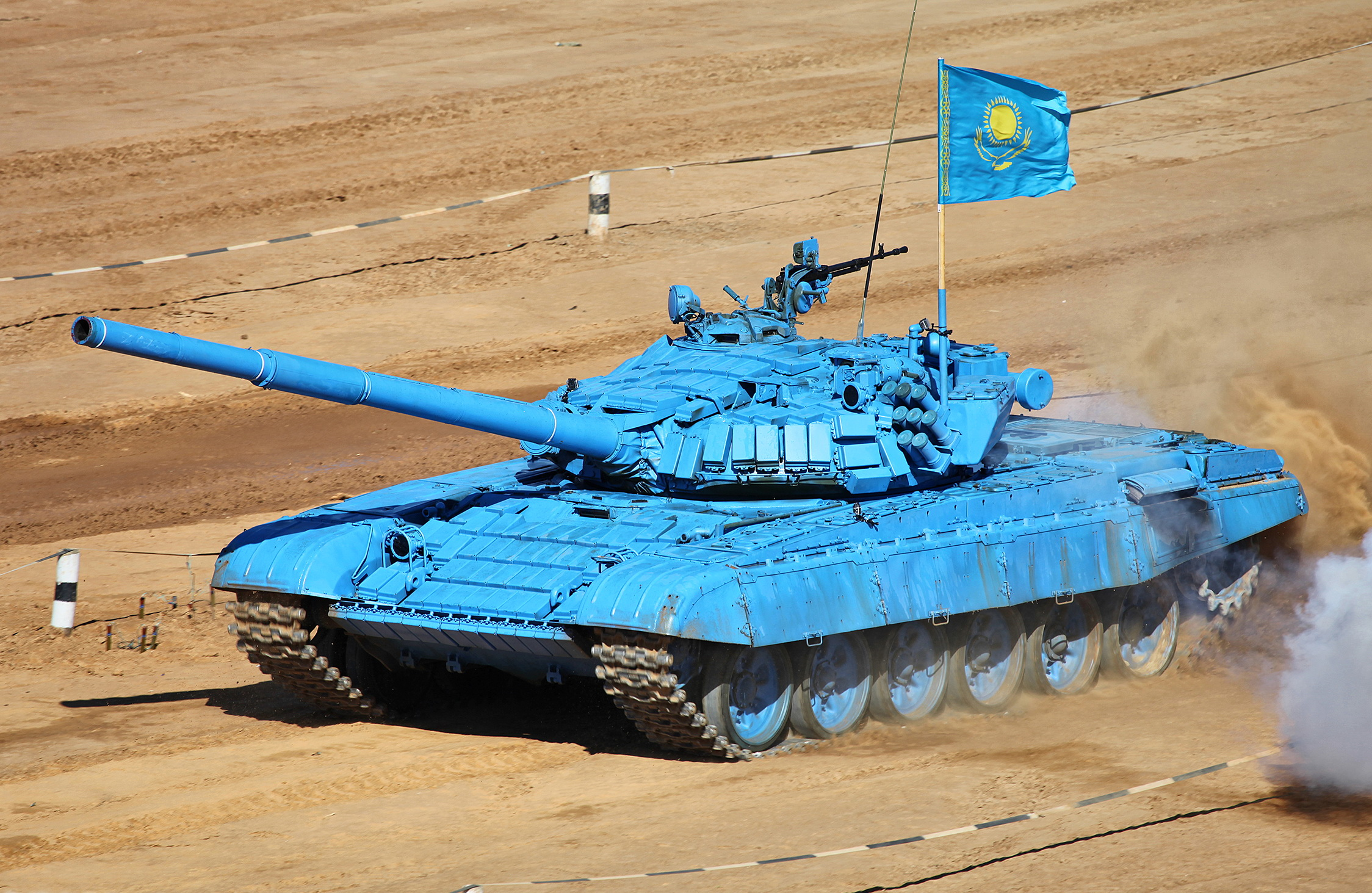
A T-72 main battle tank

Name	Photo	Origin	Type	Quantity	Notes
Tanks
T-72		Soviet Union Russian Federation / Kazakhstan	Main battle tank	350	T72BA variant Soviet T-72 tanks were modernized.
Tank support vehicle
BMPT		Russian Federation	Tank support vehicle	3	
Armoured reconnaissance vehicle
BRDM-2		Soviet Union	Reconnaissance vehicle	40	
BRM-1		Soviet Union	Reconnaissance vehicle	60	
Infantry fighting vehicle
BMP-2		Soviet Union	Infantry fighting vehicle	280	
BTR-80		Soviet Union	Amphibious infantry fighting vehicle	70	BTR-80A
Taimas 8×8		Turkey/ China	Infantry fighting vehicle	5	Otokar Arma body with Norinco VN-11
BTR-82		Soviet Union	Infantry fighting vehicle	63	BTR-82A
Armoured personnel carrier
BPM-97		Russia	Armoured personnel carrier, MRAP	18	
MT-LB		Soviet Union	Armoured personnel carrier	50	
BTR-3		Ukraine	Armoured personnel carrier	2	BTR-3E
BTR-80A		Soviet Union / Russian Federation	Armoured personnel carrier	150	
Protected patrol vehicle
Arlan(Marauder)		South Africa / Kazakhstan	MRAP	138	License built by Kazakhstan Paramount Engineering
Armoured utility vehicle
Otokar Cobra		Turkey	Infantry mobility vehicle	17	+30 unit ordered.
Roshel Senator		Canada	Infantry mobility vehicle	N/A	
Plasan SandCat		Israel / Kazakhstan	Light armoured vehicle	100	
Engineering & Maintenance vehicles
MT-LB		Soviet Union	Armoured engineering vehicle	50	
Anti-tank vehicles
HMMWV		United States	Armored car/Missile launcher	40	Equipped with 9K111-1 Konkurs ATGM
MT-LB		Soviet Union	Missile launcher vehicle	6	Equipped with 9P149 Shturm
Self-propelled artillery
2S1 Gvozdika		Soviet Union	122 mm self-propelled howitzer	60	
Semser		Soviet Union	122 mm self-propelled howitzer	6	
2S3 Akatsiya		Soviet Union	152 mm self-propelled howitzer	60	2S3M
Towed artillery
D-30		Soviet Union	122 mm howitzer	100	
Msta-B		Soviet Union	152 mm howitzer	70	
D-20		Soviet Union	152 mm howitzer	24	
Multiple rocket launcher
BM-21 Grad		Soviet Union	Multiple launch rocket system	80	
TOS-1A		Soviet Union / Russia	Multiple launch rocket system	3	
BM-30 Smerch		Soviet Union	Multiple launch rocket system	6	
IMI Lynx / PULS		Israel / Kazakhstan	Multiple launch rocket system	18	
9P140 Uragan		Soviet Union	Multiple launch rocket system	180	Unknown status as 2024
Mortar carrier
Cardom		Israel / Kazakhstan	120 mm self-propelled mortar	18	
2S9 Nona		Soviet Union	120 mm self-propelled mortar	45	
Ballistic missiles
9K79 Tochka		Soviet Union	Tactical ballistic missile	12	
Surface-to-air missile systems
S-300		Soviet Union	Long-range surface-to-air missile	40+	S-300PS
S-200		Soviet Union	Long-range surface-to-air missile	3	S-200 Angara
S-75 Dvina		Soviet Union	Medium-range surface-to-air missile	12	S-75M
Buk-M2E		Soviet Union / Russian Federation	Medium-range surface-to-air missile	3	+1 battery ordered.
S-125		Soviet Union	Short-range surface-to-air missile	3	S-125T
2K12 Kub		Soviet Union	Short-range surface-to-air missile	N/A	
9K35 Strela-10		Soviet Union	Point-defence surface-to-air missile	50 unit	

=== Aircraft ===
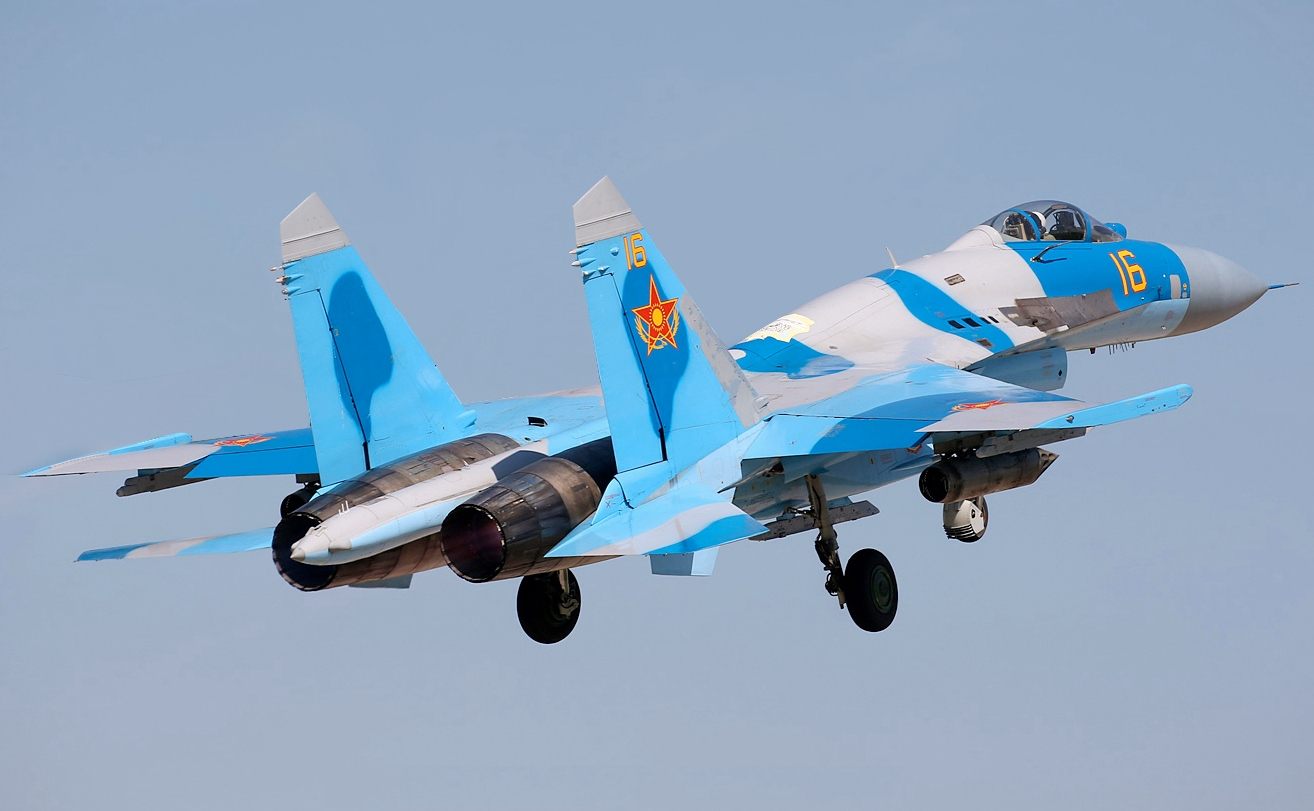
A Kazakh Sukhoi Su-27

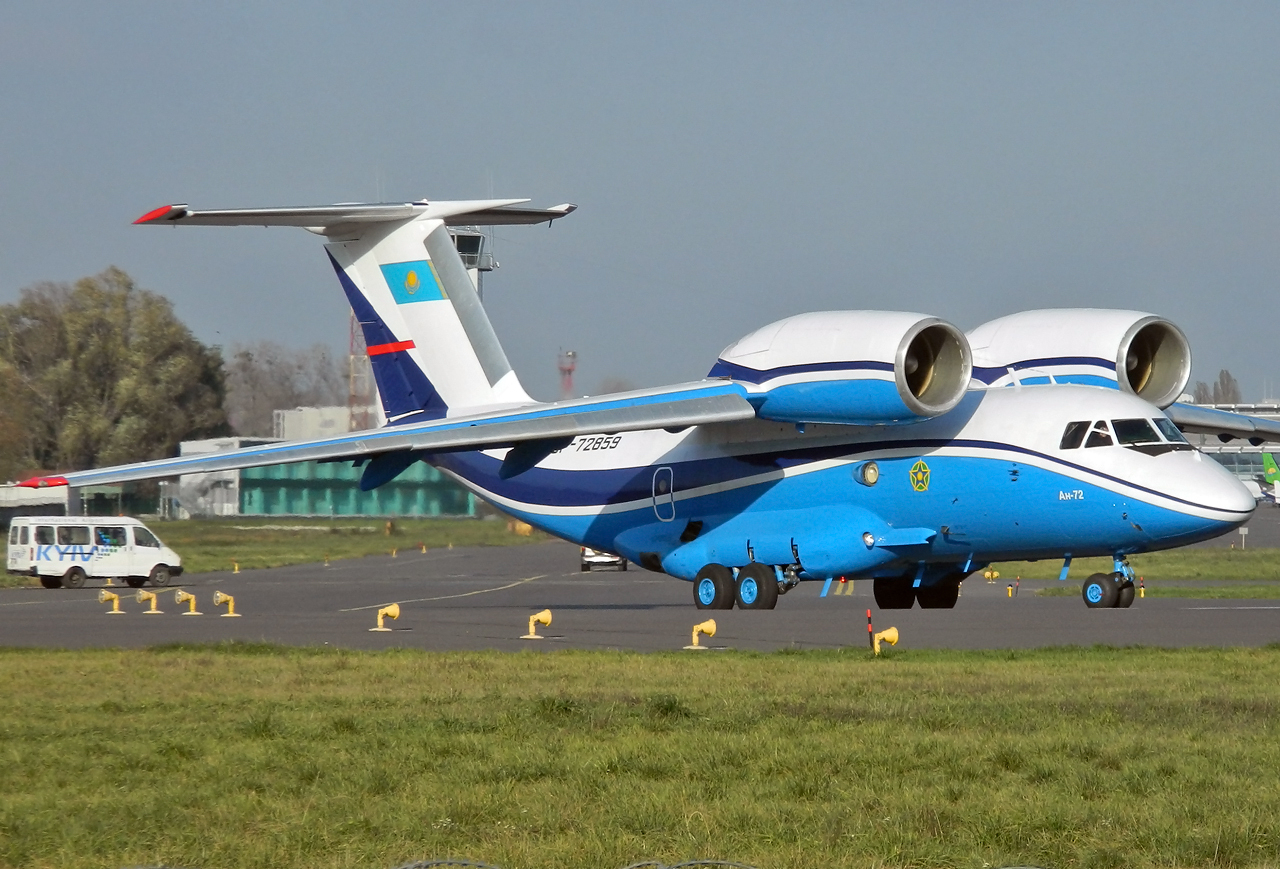
Antonov An-72 of the Kazakh Air Force

Aircraft	Origin	Type	Variant	Quantity	Notes
Combat aircraft
MiG-31	Soviet Union	Interceptor aircraft	Mig-31/Mig-31BM	31	All stored for sale
Sukhoi Su-27/Su-30	Soviet Union / Russia	Air superiority/Multi role fighter	Su-27/Su-27BM2 and Su-27UB/Su-27UBM2/Su-30SM	47	24 Su-27 & 23 Su-30 24 Su-27 and 24 Su-30 on order.
Sukhoi Su-25	Soviet Union	Ground Attack		14	
Mig-23	Soviet Union	Fighter-bomber	Mig-23UB	2	Stored for sale
Reconnaissance
Antonov An-30	Soviet Union	ISR		1	
Transport
Antonov An-12	Soviet Union	Medium transport		2	
Antonov An-26	Soviet Union	Light transport		6	
Antonov An-72	Soviet Union	Light transport		2	STOL capable aircraft.
CASA C-295	Multinational	Light Transport	C-295M/C-295W	9	
A400M Atlas	Multinational	Medium to Heavy Transport	A400M	2	
Helicopters
Mil Mi-24	Soviet Union	Attack helicopter	Mi-24V	20	Some upgraded
Mil Mi-35	Russia	Attack helicopter	Mi-35M	12	
Mil Mi-17	Soviet Union	Utility	Mi-17V-5/Mi-171Sh	26	
Mil Mi-26	Soviet Union	Heavy lift/Transport		4	
UH-1	United States	Utility helicopter	UH-1H	4	
Eurocopter EC145	Multinational	Utility/transport		8	20 on order.
Trainer aircraft
Aero L-39	Czechoslovakia	Jet trainer		17	
Zlin 242	Czechoslovakia	Trainer aircraft		2	
Unmanned aerial vehicle
TAI Anka	Turkey	MALE UCAV	Anka-S	3	
CAIG Wing Loong	China	Medium-altitude long-endurance unmanned aerial vehicle		2	

=== Naval equipment ===
Vessel	Origin	Type	Quantity	Notes
Kazakhstan	Kazakhstan	Missile boat	3	Kazakhstan-class missile boat
Kazakhstan	Kazakhstan	Patrol combatant corvette	1	
Sea Dolphin	South Korea	Fast patrol boat	3	
Türk	Turkey	Patrol boat	1	
Archangel	United States	Patrol boat	3	
Dauntless	United States	Patrol boat	1	
Lashyn	Kazakhstan	Patrol boat	1	
OPV-62	Israel	Patrol boat	2	Pacific-class
Shaldag	Israel / Azerbaijan	Go-fast boat	6	Assembled in Azerbaijan.
10750E	Russia	Minesweeper	1	The first vessel was commissioned in 2017.
Project 01340G	Russia	Research vessel	1	The ship is known to be a Hydrographic ship, the vessels name is Zhaiyk.
Alister 9	France	Unmanned underwater vehicle	1	
K-Ster I/C	France	Unmanned underwater vehicle	1	Used for mine warfare
