= Smetona =

Smetona is the masculine form of a Lithuanian family name. Its feminine forms are: Smetonienė (married woman or widow) and Smetonaitė (unmarried woman).

The surname may refer to:

- Antanas Smetona (1874–1944), Lithuanian intellectual and journalist
- Irena Smetonienė (born 1961), Lithuanian linguist and professor
- Rimantas Smetona (born 1945), Lithuanian film and television director and a politician, M.P.

== See also ==
- Lithuanian warship Prezidentas Smetona
