= Flagship =

Vessel used by naval commanding officer

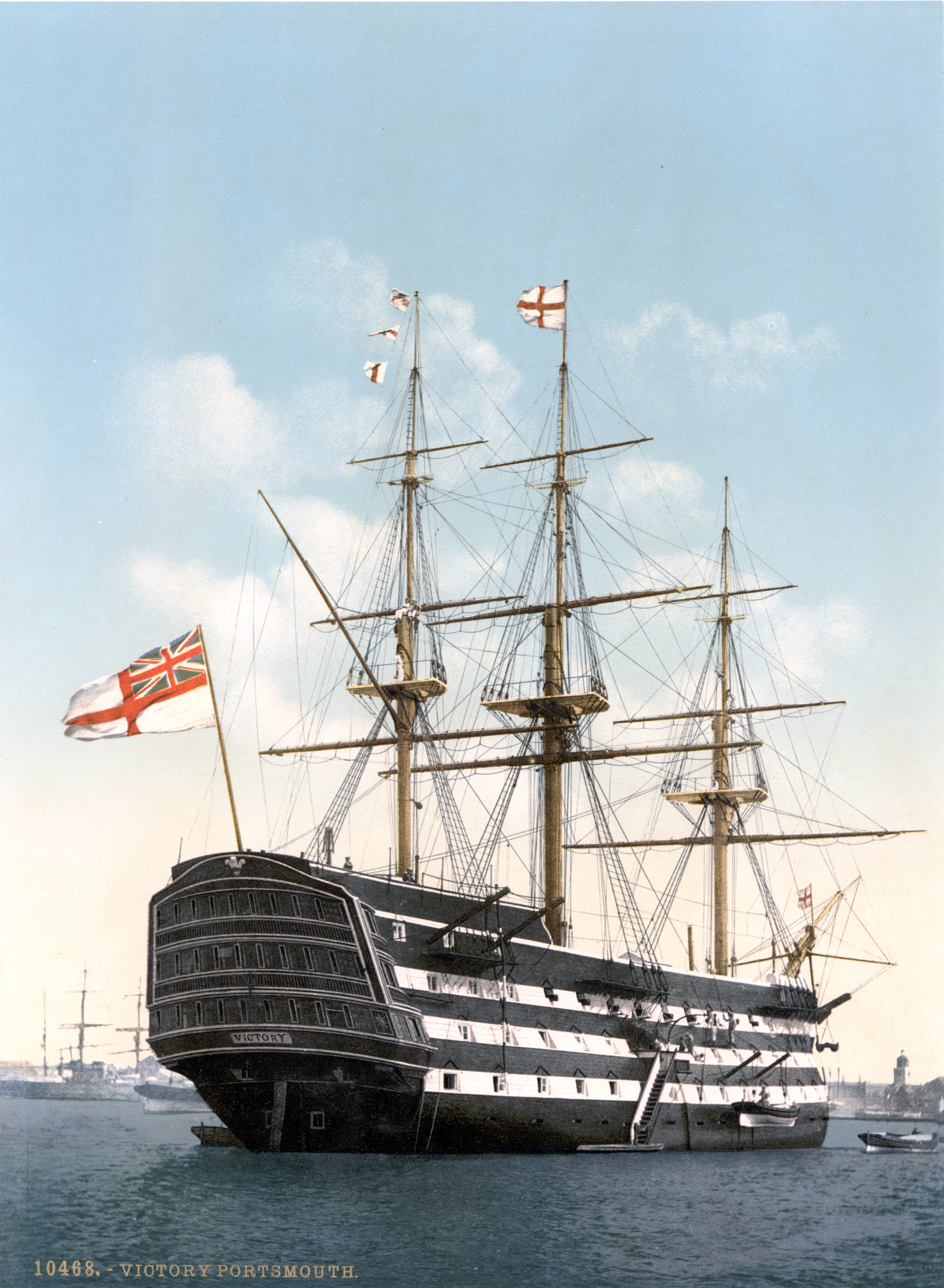
HMS Victory, flagship of the First Sea Lord of the Royal Navy

A flagship is a vessel used by the commanding officer of a group of naval ships, characteristically a flag officer entitled by custom to fly a distinguishing flag. Used more loosely, it is the lead ship in a fleet of vessels, typically the first, largest, fastest, most heavily armed, or best known.

Over the years, the term flagship has become a metaphor used in industries such as broadcasting, automobiles, education, technology, airlines, and retail to refer to their highest quality, best known, or most expensive products and locations.

== Naval use ==
In common naval use, the term flagship is fundamentally a temporary designation; the flagship is wherever the admiral's flag is being flown. However, admirals have always needed additional facilities, including a meeting room large enough to hold all the captains of the fleet and a place for the admiral's staff to make plans and draw up orders. Historically, only larger ships could accommodate such requirements.

The term was also used by commercial fleets, when the distinction between a nation's navy and merchant fleet was not clear.

In the age of sailing ships, the flagship was typically a first rate; the aft of one of the three decks would become the admiral's quarters and staff offices. This can be seen on HMS Victory, the flagship of Admiral Horatio Nelson at the Battle of Trafalgar in 1805, still serving the Royal Navy as the ceremonial flagship of the First Sea Lord from Portsmouth, England.

In the 20th century, ships became large enough that the larger types, cruisers and up, could accommodate a commander and staff. Some larger ships may have a separate flag bridge for use by the admiral and his staff while the captain commands from the main navigation bridge. Because its primary function is to coordinate a fleet, a flagship is not necessarily more heavily armed or armored than other ships.

Modern flagships are designed primarily for command and control rather than for fighting, and are also known as command ships.

== Flagship as metaphor ==
As with many other naval terms, flagship has crossed over into general usage, where it means the most important or leading member of a group, as in the flagship station of a broadcast network. The word can be used as a noun or an adjective describing the most prominent or highly touted product, brand, location, or service offered by a company. Derivations include the "flagship brand" or "flagship product" of a manufacturing company, "flagship store" of a retail chain, or "flagship service" of a hospitality or transportation concern.

The term "flagship" may have specific applications:

- Auto companies may have a flagship in the form of their leading or highest-priced car.
- Electronics companies may have a series of products considered to be their flagship, usually consisting of one or two products that are updated periodically. For example, the Samsung Galaxy S series consists of several flagship smartphones that are released on a yearly basis.
- In rail transport, a "flagship service" is either the fastest or most luxurious.

=== Colleges and universities in the United States ===
Most states in the United States provide public university education through one or more university systems, with each system having multiple campuses located throughout the state. The phrase flagship institution or flagship university may be applied to an individual school or campus within each state system. The College Board, for example, defines flagship universities as the first to be established as well as the most research-intensive public universities. These schools are often land-grant research universities. According to Robert M. Berdahl, then-chancellor of the University of California, Berkeley, the phrase "flagship" came into existence in the 1950s when the Morrill Act schools were joined by newer institutions built in a wave of post-war expansion of state university systems.

Berdahl notes further that because flagships are generally the oldest schools within a system, they are often the largest and best financed and are perceived as elite relative to non-flagship state schools. He comments that "Those of us in 'systems' of higher education are frequently actively discouraged from using the term 'flagship' to refer to our campuses because it is seen as hurtful to the self-esteem of colleagues at other institutions in our systems. The use of the term is seen by some as elitist and boastful. It is viewed by many, in the context of the politics of higher education, as 'politically incorrect.' ... Only in the safe company of alumni is one permitted to use the term."

Nevertheless, the term "flagship university" is still used in official contexts by various state university system boards of governors, state legislatures, and scholars. Additionally, state universities often self-designate themselves as flagships. Higher education agencies, research journals, and other organizations also use the term, though their lists of flagship universities can differ greatly. One list of 50 flagship universities (one per state) is employed by the Higher Education Coordinating Board, the College Board, the Princeton Review and many other state and federal educational and governmental authorities for a variety of purposes including tuition and rate comparisons, research studies and public policy analyses.

Despite its ubiquity, this list of 50 flagships is not the only state-by-state examination of flagships. In a 2010 article, Standard & Poor's created its own list of flagship universities, noting that each state had typically one or two institutions with flagship characteristics. The Education Sector, an education policy organization, used a different list of 51 flagship universities in an August 2011 study of college debt. Several states had multiple universities categorized as flagships due to "less of a clear distinction between a single flagship and other public universities" in those states. Additionally, several states were not included in the study due to insufficient comparative data. There are many instances in which more than one school in a state has claimed to be, or has been described as a "flagship".

In February 2012, Idaho's State Board of Education made a controversial decision to strike the word "flagship" from the University of Idaho's mission statement. The Board's President Richard Westerberg explained that this revision was made as part of the board's many changes made to multiple Idaho universities' mission statements in an effort to ensure all statements were consistent and collegial in nature rather than comparative or competitive.

=== Retailing ===
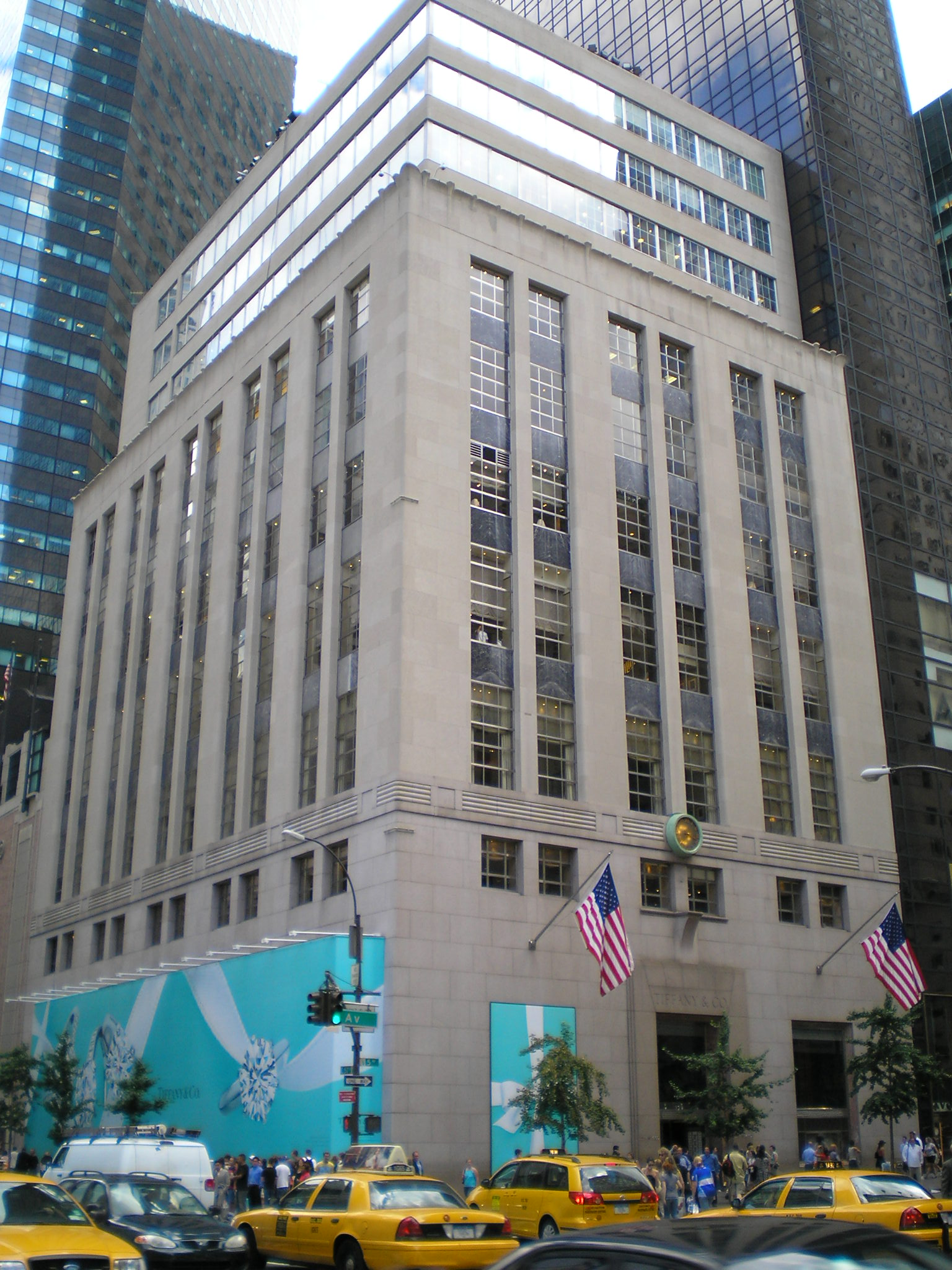
Tiffany & Co.'s 10-story flagship store on Fifth Avenue in New York City

Flagship stores are core stores for brand name retailers, larger than their standard outlets and stocking greater inventory, often found in prominent shopping districts such as Fifth Avenue in New York, Oxford Street in London, or Ginza district in Tokyo.

=== Broadcasting ===
A flagship station is the principal station of a radio or television broadcast network. It can be the station that produces the largest amount of material for the network, or the station in the parent company's home city, or both. The term dates back to the mid twentieth century years of broadcasting when headquarters stations produced programs for their networks.

For example, the flagship stations of the ABC, NBC and CBS television and radio networks are their owned and operated outlets in New York City. Likewise, public television's WNET served as primary member station for National Educational Television (NET), a forerunner to the US Public Broadcasting Service (PBS).

In sports broadcasting, the "flagship" is a team's primary station in their home market, which produces game broadcasts and feeds them to affiliates. For example, WGN was the flagship station of the Chicago Cubs baseball team, which has an extensive Cubs radio network spanning several states.

=== Automobiles ===
The term flagship is also used to describe an automaker's top (i.e., largest/most expensive/most prestigious) vehicle. Modern examples include the Mercedes-Benz S-Class, BMW 7 series, Toyota Century, Hongqi L5, and Land Rover's Range Rover.

=== Airlines ===
American Airlines obtained copyright to the term "Flagship" on 3 May 1937, per the Catalog of Copyright Entries. As of 20 December 2019 as stated in a legal document, this includes "the marks "Flagship", "Flagship Lounge" and "Flagship Suite" (the "Flagship Marks")—to describe premium air travel services for first and business class passengers since the 1930s and 1940s." Delta Air Lines also uses/used the word "Flagship" to describe its top lines, as pointed out by AA and being argued legally in December 2019 and into 2020.

=== Conservation ===
Within conservation biology, the term flagship species refers to a species or taxon that is a symbol or rallying point to catalyze conservation actions.

== See also ==
- List of flagships (naval vessels)
