= HDMS Flyvefisken (P550) =

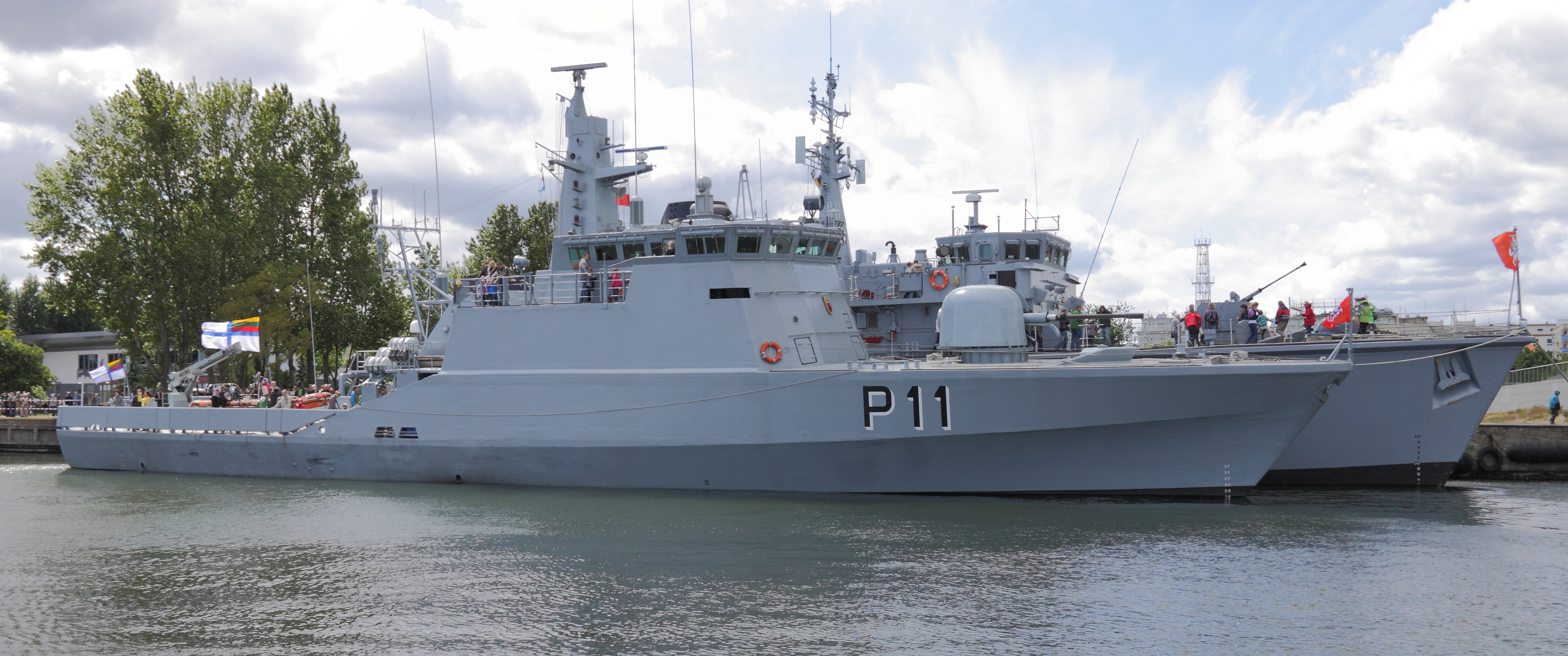
- LNS Žemaitis patrol vessel employed by Lithuanian Naval Force

History

Denmark
- Name: Flyvefisken
- Laid down: 15 August 1985
- Launched: 26 April 1986
- Commissioned: 19 December 1989
- Decommissioned: 30 May 2008

Lithuania
- Name: Žemaitis
- Commissioned: July 2008
- Identification: MMSI number: 277154000; Callsign: LYPA

General characteristics
- Class & type: Flyvefisken-class patrol vessel
- Displacement: 320 tonnes (315 long tons) light; 450 tonnes (443 long tons) full load
- Length: 54 m (177 ft 2 in)
- Beam: 9 m (29 ft 6 in)
- Draught: 2.5 m (8 ft 2 in)
- Propulsion: 2 × MTU 16V 396TB94 diesels 4,226 kW (5,667 hp) total
- Speed: 20 knots (37 km/h; 23 mph)
- Range: 3,860 nmi (7,150 km) at 18 kn (33 km/h; 21 mph)
- Complement: 19-29 depending on role
- Armament: 1 × OTO Melara 76 mm/62 gun; 2 × 12.7 mm machine guns

HDMS Flyvefisken (P550) is a Danish warship. She is the name ship in the Flyvefisken class, which is also known as the Standardflex 300 or SF300 class. In 2007, Flyvefisken was sold to the Lithuanian Navy, which renamed her LKL Zemaitis.
