= Vanguard-class multirole warship =

Warship in development

The Vanguard-class multirole warship is a warship currently being developed by Kongsberg Gruppen of Norway. It is a modular warship based on commercial design and shipbuilding principles. It is intended to meet a requirement for a mix of "Search & Rescue, Harbor and Assets Protection, Subsea Survey, Exercising Authority and Sovereignty, Anti-Access/Area Denial, Anti-Submarine Warfare and Mine Clearance, and Detection and Disposal."

== Design and description ==
Kongsberg collaborated with Salt Ship Design of Leirvik, Norway to develop the conceptual designs. The design is intended to be built in commercial shipyards at a considerable cost saving over dedicated naval shipyards, taking as little as two years to build.

The multirole ship has positions for role-specific ISO containers that can be swapped to change roles. The design has one helicopter spot at the back, for up to medium-sized aircraft. There is no hangar. A fully enclosed boat deck at roughly the middle of the ship's length opens at both sides to allow gantry cranes to deploy both sides to lower boats to the water. Additionally, a smaller seaboat is sited on the port side. The two propellers are above the keel. Two bow thrusters are sited just behind the bulbous bow. With likely limited speed requirements, the fuel consumption is likely to be low.

=== Armament ===
Depictions of the ship show a single mount for a small calibre gun on the foredeck.

=== Crew ===
Crew numbers could be as few as 16 to 20 in some role configurations.

== Future operators ==
=== Royal Norwegian Navy ===
Following the collision and sinking of the Royal Norwegian Navy ship HNoMS Helge Ingstad in November 2018, the repair cost has been estimated at 13 billion Kroner (USD$1.4 billion), nearly three times the cost of the original build, there has been speculation that the Navy would instead invest in another class of ships. Vanguard is intended to meet this as-yet unstated requirement.

=== Lithuanian Navy ===
In May 2025, Lithuanian Ministry of National Defence announced the intent to acquire the Vanguard-class ships. On 9 July 2026, Lithuania signed an agreement with Norway on participation in the Vanguard-class ship development program. It was also announced that the Lithuanian Navy intends to acquire four ships.

=== Royal Navy ===
In October 2026, it was announced that the United Kingdom intends to participate in the P1118 program, with Vanguard-class multirole warship being the primary candidate. The Royal Navy intends to order up to 6 ships.

=== Canadian Coast Guard ===
The Canadian Coast Guard will acquire six Mid-Shore Multi-Mission Vessels based off the Vanguard design.
