= HDMS Hajen =

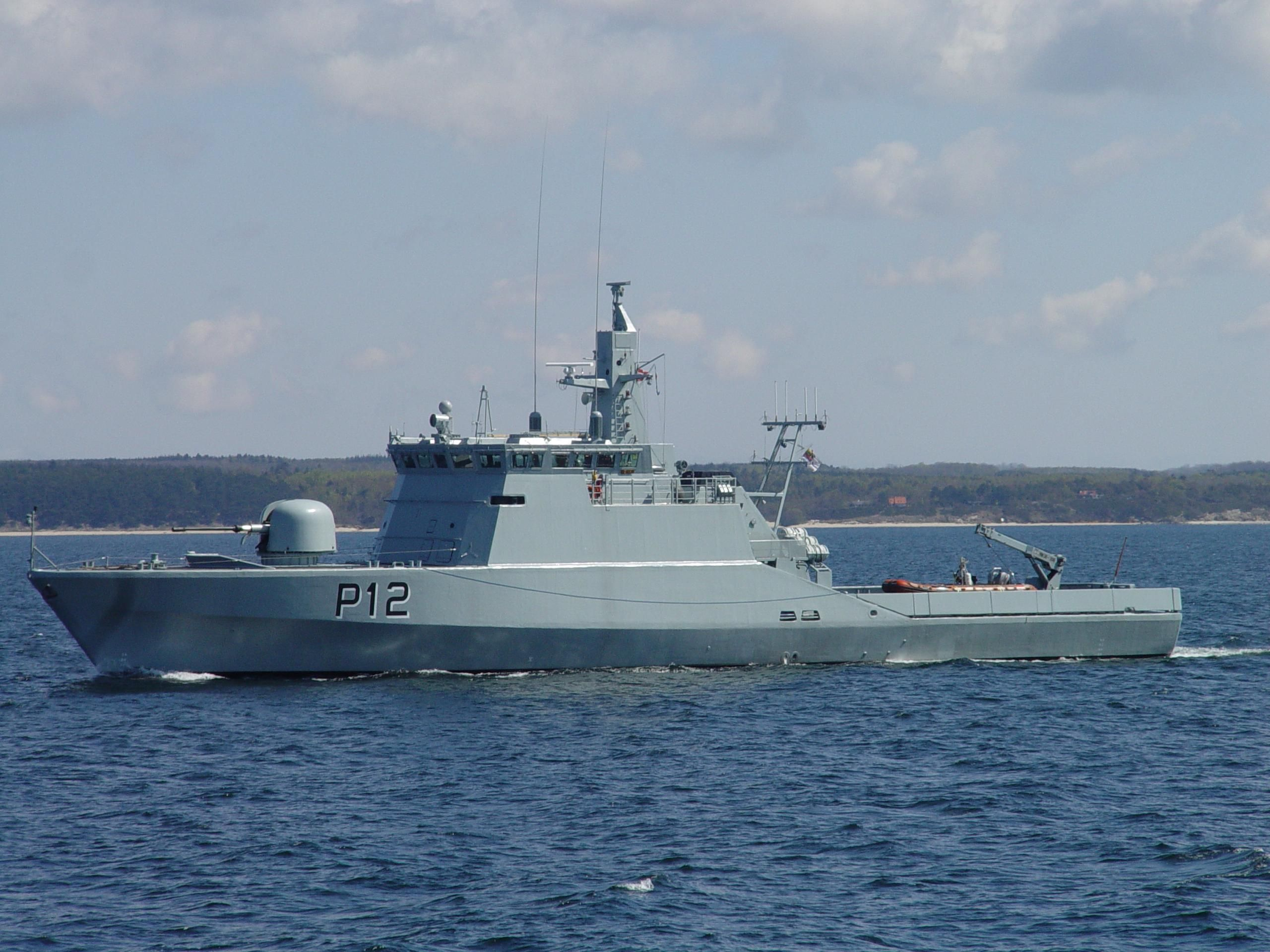
- LNS Dzūkas

History

Denmark
- Name: Hajen
- Namesake: Shark in Danish
- Builder: Danyard A/S, Frederikshavn
- Laid down: February 1988
- Launched: 6 August 1989
- Commissioned: 19 August 1990
- Decommissioned: 23 January 2009
- Identification: Hull number: P551
- Fate: Sold to Lithuania

Lithuania
- Name: Dzūkas
- Namesake: Dzūkija region
- Commissioned: 2009
- Identification: IMO number: 4590584; MMSI number: 277156000; Hull number: P 12
- Status: In service

General characteristics
- Class & type: Flyvefisken-class patrol vessel
- Displacement: 400 tonnes (394 long tons)
- Length: 54 m (177 ft 2 in)
- Beam: 9 m (29 ft 6 in)
- Draught: 3.60 m (11 ft 10 in)
- Propulsion: 2× MTU 16V 396TB94 diesel engines (5,440 hp (4,060 kW) total); 1× General Electric LM500 gas turbine (5,450 hp (4,060 kW)); 1× General Motors 12V-71 hydraulic motor (540 hp (400 kW))
- Speed: 20 knots (37 km/h; 23 mph) (28 knots (52 km/h; 32 mph) with gas turbine)
- Range: 2,000 nmi (3,700 km)
- Boats & landing craft carried: 1x RHIB
- Complement: 19 to 29
- Sensors & processing systems: 1× Furuno navigation radar; 1× Terma Scanter mil surface radar; 1× Flexfire fire control radar
- Armament: Guns; 1× OTO Melara 76 mm/62 gun; 2× 12.7 mm machine guns; Missiles; FIM-92 Sea Stinger (in MCM role); 12x RIM-162 Evolved Sea Sparrow (in combat role); 8× RGM-84 Harpoon (in combat role); Torpedoes; 4× MU90 torpedoes (in combat role)

LNS Dzūkas (P 12) (ex-HDMS Hajen (P551)) is a former patrol boat of the Royal Danish Navy. Since 2009 she is in service with the Lithuanian Navy.

== History ==
She is the second ship in the Flyvefisken class, which is also known as the Standardflex 300 or SF300 class. She was laid down in February 1988, launched on 6 August 1989, with the commissioning taking place on 19 August 1990.

In 2009, Hajen was sold to the Lithuanian Navy, which renamed her Dzūkas. After a refit she was commissioned into the navy later that same year.
