= HMS Cottesmore (M32) =

Hunt-class mine countermeasures vessel

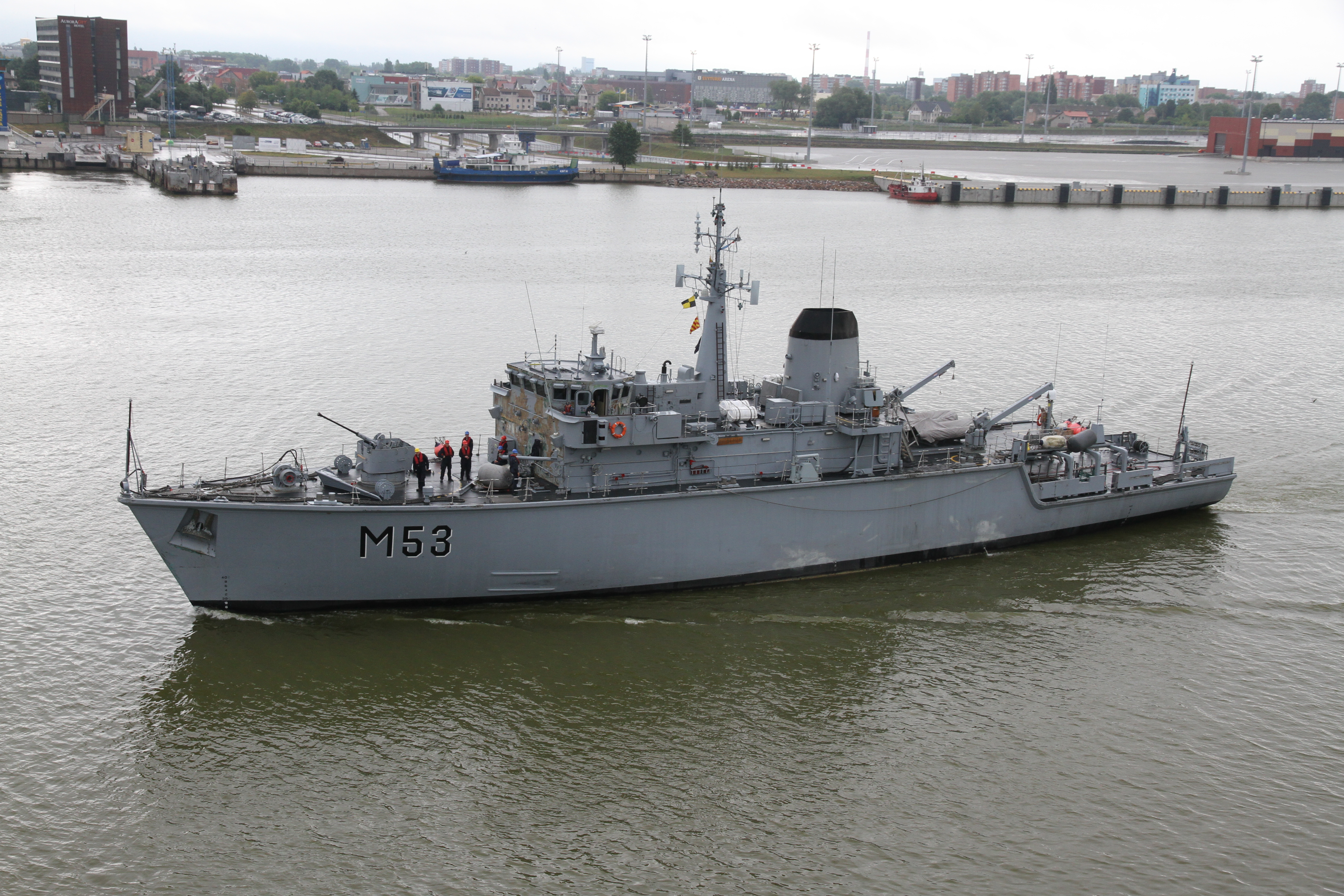
- HMS Cottesmore in Lithuanian service as Skalvis (M53)

History

United Kingdom
- Name: Cottesmore
- Builder: Yarrow Shipbuilders
- Launched: 9 February 1982
- Sponsored by: Lady Buchanan, wife of Vice-Admiral Sir Peter Buchanan
- Commissioned: 24 June 1983
- Decommissioned: September 2005
- Identification: Pennant number: M32
- Fate: Sold to Lithuania

Lithuania
- Name: Skalvis
- Acquired: 2008
- Commissioned: 2011
- Identification: Pennant number: M53
- Status: In active service

General characteristics
- Class & type: Hunt-class mine countermeasures vessel
- Displacement: 750 tons
- Length: 60 m (200 ft)
- Beam: 9.8 m (32 ft)
- Draught: 2.2 m (7.2 ft)
- Propulsion: 2 shaft Napier Deltic diesel, 3,540 shp (2,640 kW)
- Speed: 17 knots (31 km/h)
- Complement: 45 (6 officers & 39 ratings)
- Sensors & processing systems: Sonar Type 2193
- Armament: 40 mm Bofors; 2 × Mk44 minigun; 3 × 7.62 mm general purpose machine guns; Mine counter measures equipment: SeaFox mine disposal system; Diver-placed explosive charges

HMS Cottesmore was a Hunt-class mine countermeasures vessel of the British Royal Navy, launched in 1982 and converted in 1997 into a patrol vessel. The ship was declared surplus to requirement and put on the MoD list for disposal in 2004. In 2008 she was bought by Lithuania, along with HMS Dulverton.

When introduced, the Hunt-class vessels were the largest warships ever built out of glass-reinforced plastic. All were built by Vosper Thornycroft in Woolston, Hampshire except Cottesmore and Middleton, which were built by Yarrow Shipbuilders Limited on the River Clyde.

Lieutenant Commander Prince Andrew, Duke of York commanded Cottesmore from April 1993 until November 1994. She was decommissioned by the Royal Navy in September 2005. The ship's bell and other memorabilia were presented to the village of Cottesmore in Rutland.

The ship entered service with the Lithuanian Navy as M53 Skalvis. Thales was the prime contractor to upgrade the vessels with a technologically advanced mine-hunting system including the hull-mounted Sonar 2193 system, propulsion, command and control, and mine-disposal systems.
