= LKL Sūduvis (M52) =

Coordinates: 55.708918°N 21.129246°E

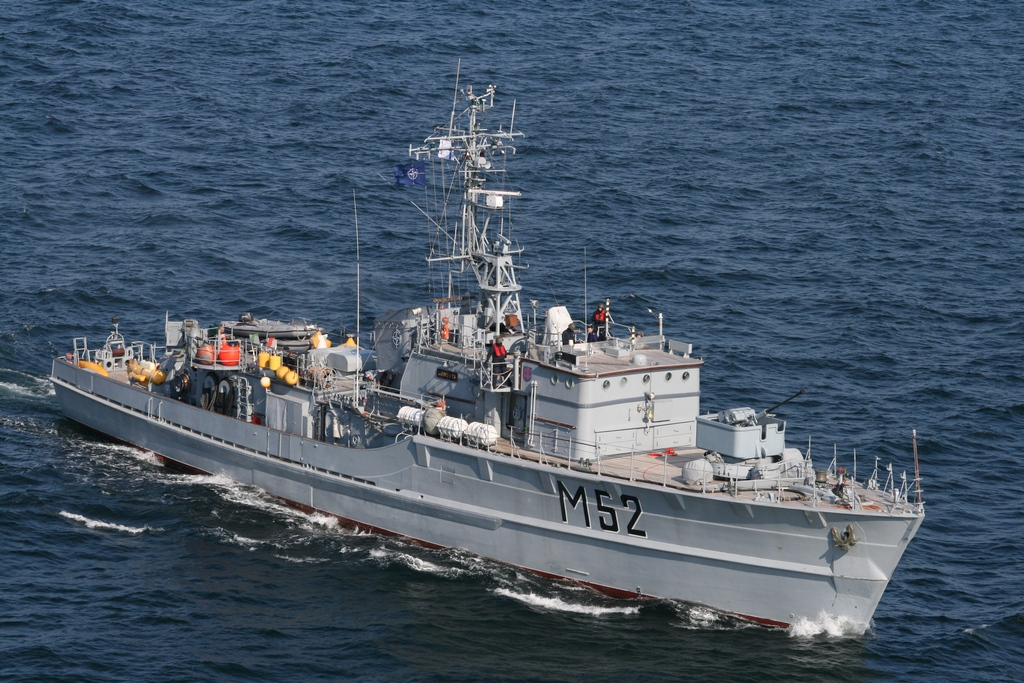

History

Germany
- Name: Koblenz (M1071)
- Namesake: Koblenz
- Builder: Burmester Werft, Bremen
- Launched: 6 May 1957
- Commissioned: 8 July 1958
- Decommissioned: 1975
- Refit: 1960–64, to Type 331 minehunter
- Fate: donated to Lithuania, 1999

History

Lithuania
- Name: Sūduvis (M52)
- Acquired: 1999
- Commissioned: 22 June 1999
- Decommissioned: 2021
- Status: Turned into a museum ship.

General characteristics
- Class & type: Lindau-class minesweeper
- Displacement: 395 t (389 long tons)
- Length: 47.1 m (154 ft 6 in)
- Beam: 8.3 m (27 ft 3 in)
- Draught: 3.71 m (12 ft 2 in)
- Propulsion: 2 x MTU 871 diesel engines
- Speed: 16 knots (30 km/h)
- Sensors & processing systems: search sonar (193M)
- Armament: Bofors L/70 40 mm cannons; DK (12.7 mm) machine guns; Combat radio-electronic devices; Mine destruction charges; 2 x Type PAP 104 underwater ROVs; Trawling equipment

LKL Sūduvis (M52) was a minehunter of the Lithuanian Naval Force. Built in West Germany in 1957 as Koblenz (M1071), a Lindau-class (or Type 320) minesweeper for the German Navy, she was upgraded to a Type 331 minehunter in the 1970s. Germany donated Koblenz to the Lithuanian Naval Force in 1999. The ship, renamed Sūduvis, formed the nucleus of the Lithuanian Naval Force's Squadron of Mine-hunters, which was established on 22 June 1999. The squadron was augmented in 2001 with the similar donation of sister ship Marburg, which became Kursis (M51). In 2021, the ship was decommissioned and transferred to the Lithuanian Sea Museum.
