= LKL Kuršis (M51) =

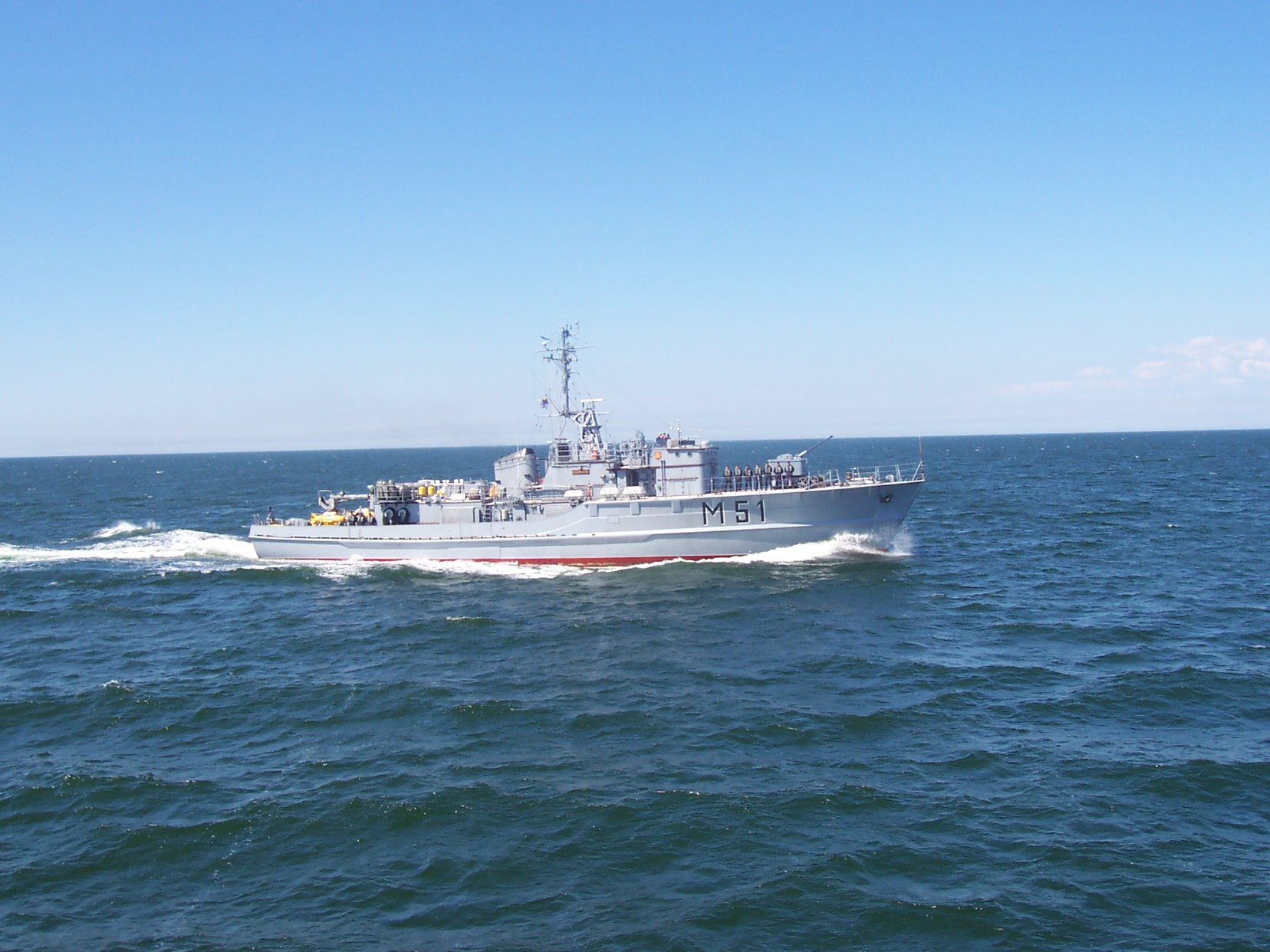
- LKL Kursis (M54)

History

Germany
- Name: Marburg (M1080)
- Namesake: Marburg
- Builder: Burmester Werft, Bremen
- Launched: 4 August 1958
- Commissioned: 11 June 1959
- Decommissioned: 25 May 2000
- Refit: 1960–64, to Type 331 minehunter
- Fate: donated to Lithuania, 2001

History

Lithuania
- Name: Kursis (M54)
- Acquired: 2001
- Commissioned: 27 April 2001
- Fate: Scrapped in 2017

General characteristics
- Class & type: Lindau-class minesweeper
- Displacement: 395 t (389 long tons)
- Length: 47.1 m (154 ft 6 in)
- Beam: 8.3 m (27 ft 3 in)
- Draught: 3.71 m (12 ft 2 in)
- Propulsion: 2 x MTU 871 diesel engines
- Speed: 16 knots (30 km/h)
- Sensors & processing systems: search sonar (193M)
- Armament: Bofors L/70 40 mm) cannons; DK (12.7 mm) machine guns; combat radio-electronic devices; mine destruction charges; 2 x Type PAP 104 underwater ROVs; trawling equipment

LKL Kursis (M54) was a minehunter of the Lithuanian Naval Force. Built in West Germany in 1958 as Marburg (M1080), a Lindau-class (or Type 320) minesweeper for the German Navy, she was upgraded to a Type 331 minehunter in the 1970s. Germany donated Marburg in 2001 to the Lithuanian Naval Force, which renamed the ship Kursis. The vessel augmented the Squadron of Mine-hunters, which had been established in 1999 with the similar donation of sister ship Koblenz, which became Sūduvis (M52).
