= HMS Dulverton (M35) =

British Navy military vessel

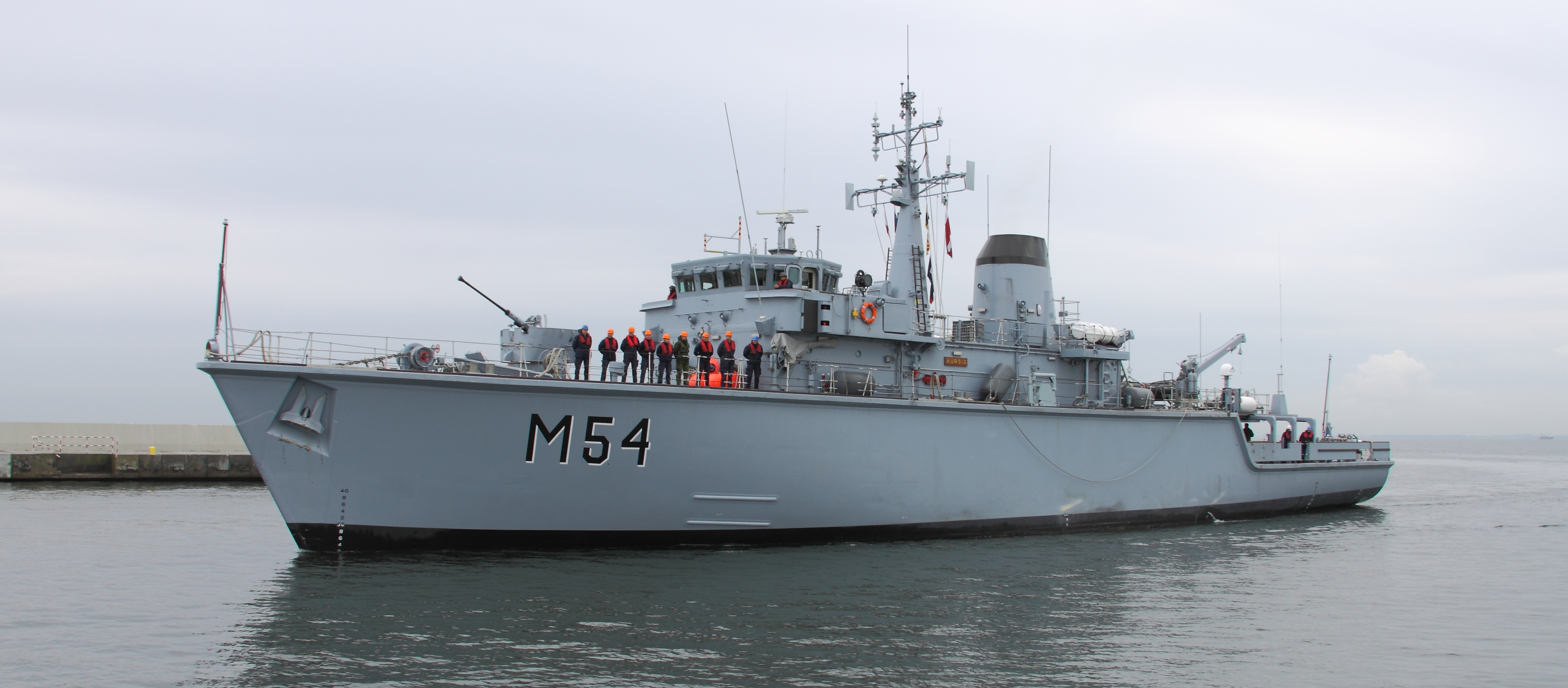
- HMS Dulverton in Lithuanian service as Kuršis (M54)

History

United Kingdom
- Name: HMS Dulverton
- Operator: Royal Navy
- Builder: Vosper Thornycroft
- Launched: 1982
- Commissioned: 1983
- Decommissioned: 2004
- Identification: Pennant number: M35
- Fate: Sold to Lithuania

Lithuania
- Name: Kuršis
- Operator: Lithuanian Naval Force
- Acquired: 2008
- Commissioned: 2011
- Identification: Pennant number: M54
- Status: In active service

General characteristics
- Class & type: Hunt-class mine countermeasures vessel
- Displacement: 750 tons
- Length: 60 m
- Beam: 9.8 m
- Draught: 2.2 m
- Propulsion: 2 shaft Napier Deltic diesel, 3,540 shp
- Speed: 17 knots
- Complement: 45 (6 officers & 39 ratings)
- Sensors & processing systems: Sonar Type 2193
- Armament: Bofors 40 mm gun; 2 × Mk44 minigun; 3 × 7.62mm general purpose machine guns; Mine counter measures equipment: SeaFox mine disposal system; Diver-placed explosive charges

HMS Dulverton was a Hunt-class mine countermeasures vessel of the British Royal Navy, launched in 1982 and converted in 1997 into a patrol vessel. The ship was declared surplus to requirement and put on the MoD list for disposal in 2004. In 2008 she was bought by Lithuania, along with HMS Cottesmore.

Thales was awarded the prime contractorship to upgrade the vessels with a technologically advanced mine-hunting system, including the hull-mounted Sonar 2193, mine-disposal, propulsion, and command and control systems. The ship entered service with the Lithuanian Navy in 2011 as M54 Kuršis.
