= Kazakhstan-class missile boat =

Kazakh navy warship class

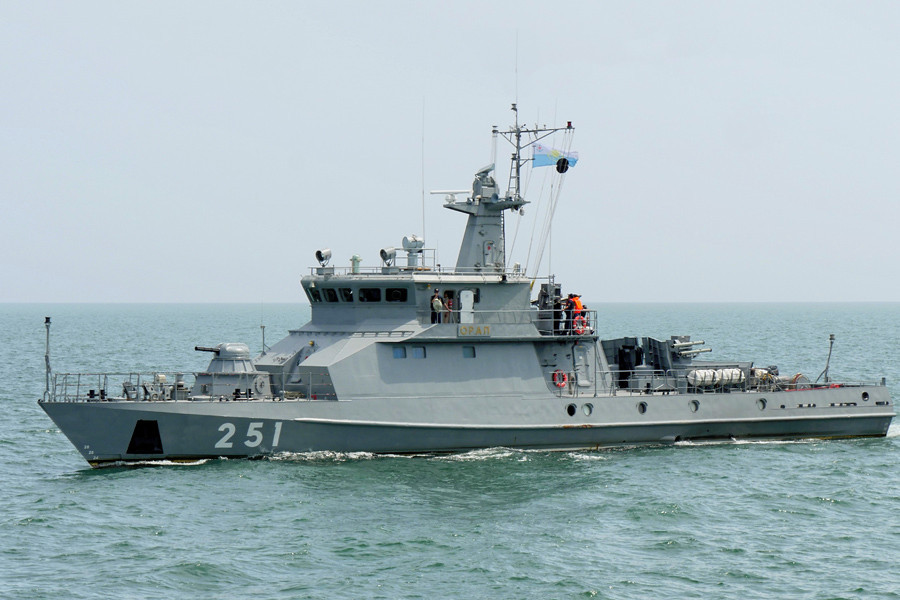

History

Kazakhstan
- Name: Kazakhstan-class
- Owner: Kazakh Navy
- Builder: Uralsk Plant Zenit JSC
- Acquired: 4
- In service: 4

General characteristics
- Class & type: Missile boat
- Displacement: 240 tons
- Length: 41.8 meters
- Beam: 7.8 meters
- Draught: 2.5 meters
- Propulsion: 2 MTU 16V4000 M71 diesels
- Speed: 30 knots
- Complement: 30
- Sensors & processing systems: Furuno, surface search radars, Cascade 250 electrooptic system
- Armament: Kazakhstan: 1 × 25mm twin 2M-3M autocannon; 2 × 14.5mm machine guns; 1 × 40-barrel 122mm BM-21 Ogon rocket launcher; Other ships: 1 × 30mm AK-630 6-barrel CIWS; 1 × Baryer-VK naval guided missile weapons system (4 × RK-2V ATGM launch tubes); 1 × Arbalet-K shipborne anti-air missile system (4 × Igla missile launchers)

The Kazakhstan-class missile boats are missile boats produced by Kazakhstan's Uralsk Plant Zenit JSC. They are the first domestically produced naval vessels in Kazakhstan and are stationed in the Caspian Sea in service with the Kazakh Navy. The vessels in the class have a displacement of 240 tons, a top speed of 30 knots, and are armed with "modernized anti-aircraft missile and artillery units." They are the largest vessels in the Kazakh Navy arsenal. There are four ships in the class, named Kazakhstan, Oral, Saryarka, and Mangistau.
