= Lindau-class minehunter =

German coastal naval ship class since 1957

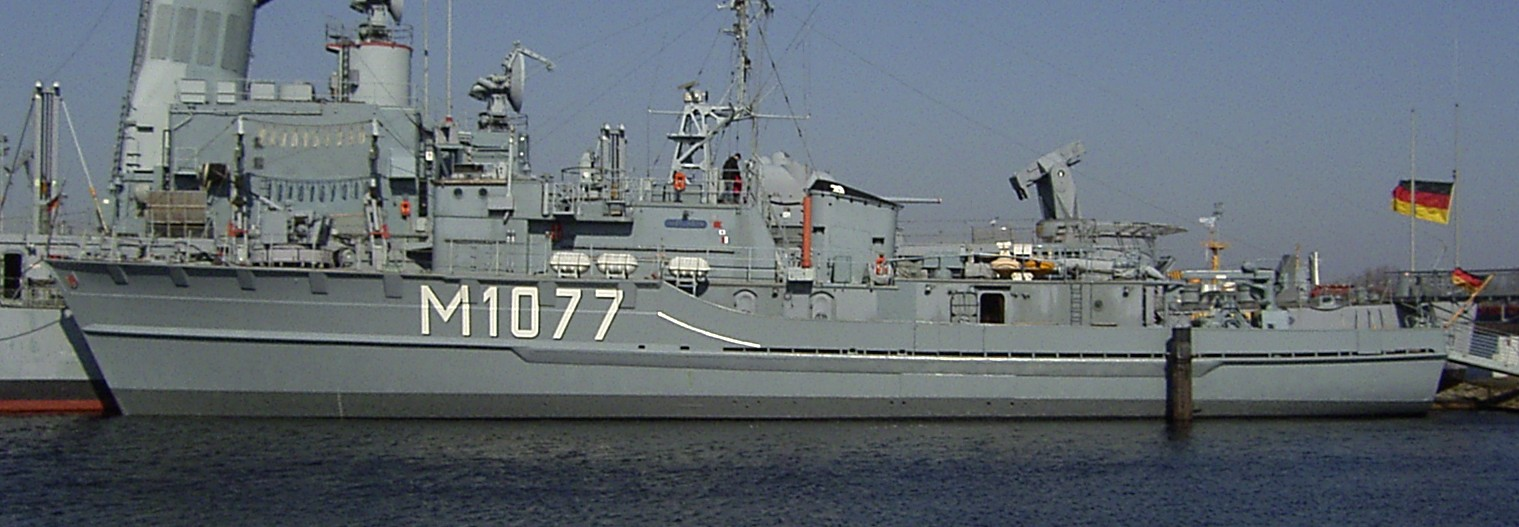
- Museum ship M1077 Weilheim

Class overview
- Builders: Burmester Werft, Bremen
- Operators: German Navy; South African Navy; Estonian Navy; Lithuanian Naval Force; Latvian Naval Forces; Coast Guard of Georgia
- In commission: 1957–present
- Completed: 18
- Preserved: 2

General characteristics
- Type: Coastal minehunter
- Displacement: 470 tonnes (463 long tons)
- Length: 47.2 m (154 ft 10 in)
- Beam: 8.3 m (27 ft 3 in)
- Draft: 3 m (9 ft 10 in)
- Propulsion: MWM Maybach (Deutz) Diesel engine
- Speed: 16.5 knots (30.6 km/h; 19.0 mph)
- Range: 1,360 km (730 nmi)
- Complement: 43-44 (5 officers)
- Sensors & processing systems: Navigation radar; Hull-mounted DSQS-11 mine-detection sonar or Plessey 193M
- Armament: 1 × Bofors 40 mm

Type 320 Lindau-class minehunters was a class of German coastal minehunters built as part of the first FRG naval program. The ships were made from non-metallic components and built by Burmester Bremen. None of these ships now remain in service with the German Navy. Several went into service with the Estonian and Lithuanian Navy, as well as the Latvian Naval Forces, where they eventually were retired. Flensburg and Weilheim became museum pieces.

Starting in 1970, 11 vessels of this class were upgraded to Type 331 Fulda-class minehunters. Beginning 1979, the six remaining vessels of this class were upgraded to Type 351 Ulm class. They were replaced by the Type 352 Ensdorf-class minesweepers.

Six of the Type 351s were sold to the South African Navy in 2001. The remaining five ships were sold by the South African Navy to a private owner in 2009 for conversion into pleasure vessels.

Tubingen was sold in 1997 to Italian industrialist Gian Carlo Bussei and converted to a yacht registered in Malta.

== Ship list ==
Pennant number	Name	Service	Upgrade	Notes
M1072	Lindau	1 February 1958–1975	Type 331	To Estonian Navy 2000. Renamed Sulev. Decommissioned 2009, for some time on display as museum ship, scrapped 2021/2022.
M1070	Göttingen	1 April 1957–1976	Type 331	To Latvian Navy 2000. It was used as spares hulk. Retired.
M1071	Koblenz	6 May 1957–1975	Type 331	To Lithuanian Navy 1999. Renamed Sūduvis. Now a museum ship.
M1075	Wetzlar	24 June 1957–1976	Type 331	
M1074	Tübingen	12 August 1957–1975	Type 331	Converted to private yacht, Gibraltar flag, retains most of original appearance including navy grey paint (except white top on funnel).
M1073	Schleswig	2 October 1957–1979	Type 351	To South African Navy 2001. Renamed SAS Tshwane.
M1076	Paderborn	4 February 1957–1979	Type 351	To South African Navy 2001. Renamed SAS Mangaung.
M1077	Weilheim	5 December 1958–1976	Type 331	On display at the Deutsches Marine Museum, Wilhelmshaven - to be scrapped in 2026
M1078	Cuxhaven	11 March 1958–1976	Type 331	To Estonian Navy 2000. Renamed Wambola. Decommissioned 2009, converted into floating restaurant and bar.
M1079	Düren	12 June 1958–1979	Type 351	To South African Navy 2001. Renamed SAS Kapa.
M1080	Marburg	4 August 1958–1976	Type 331	To Lithuanian Navy 2000. Renamed Kursis. Scrapped in 2017.
M1081	Konstanz	30 August 1958–1980	Type 351	To South African Navy 2001. Used as spares hulk. Expended as target by two Exocet MM40 missiles from SA Navy frigates Amatola and Isandlwana during Exercise Red Lion on 1 November 2007 about 90 km (56 mi) west of Saldanha Bay, South Africa.
M1082	Wolfsburg	10 December 1958–1979	Type 351	To South African Navy 2001. Renamed SAS Tekwini
M1083	Ulm	10 February 1959–1978	Type 351	To South African Navy 2001. Used as spares hulk.
M1084	Flensburg	7 April 1959–1970	Type 331	Museum ship
M1085	Minden	9 June 1959–1975	Type 331	To Coast Guard of Georgia 1998. Renamed Ayety (აეტი)
M1086	Fulda	19 August 1959–	Type 331	
M1087	Völkingen	20 October 1959–1976	Type 331	To Latvian Navy 2000. Renamed LVNS Namejs. Decommissioned in 2008.

== See also ==
- Tripartite-class minehunter
