= Lithuanian warship Prezidentas Smetona =

M1916 Type minesweeper

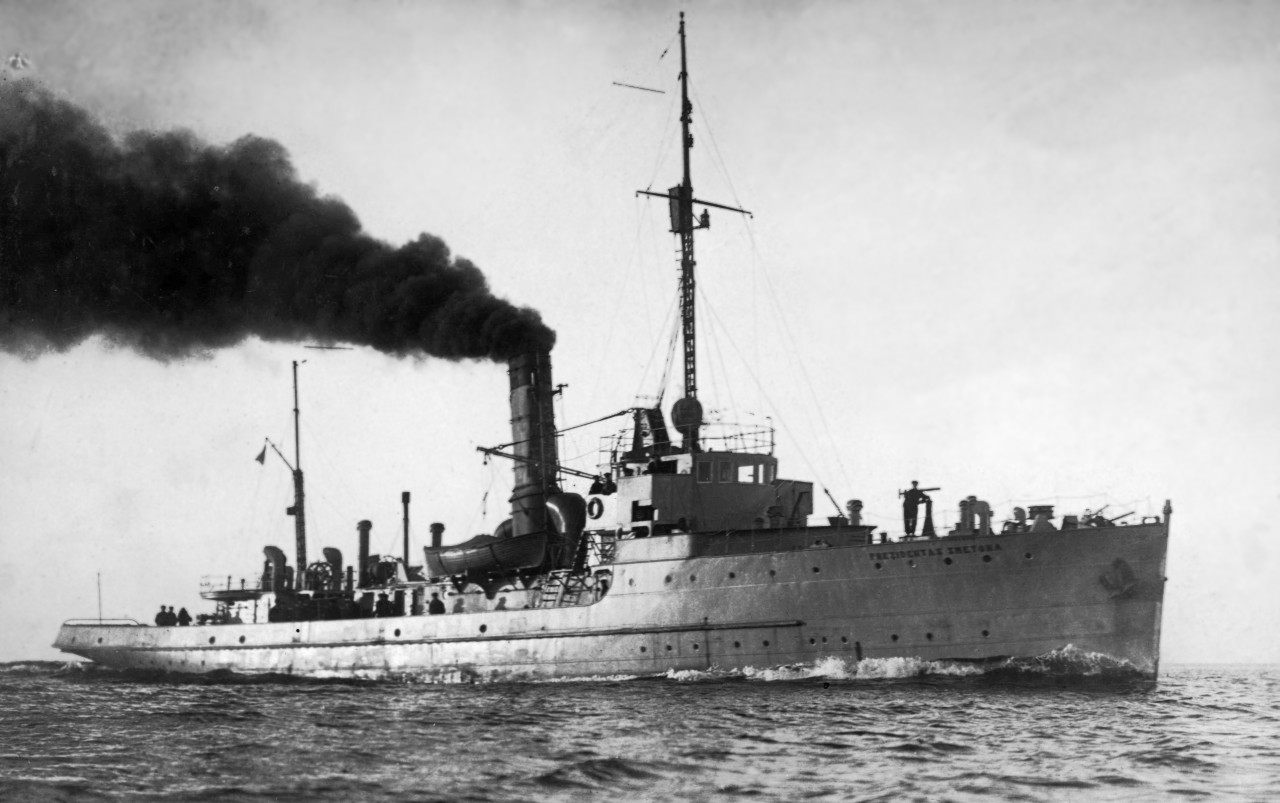

History

German Empire
- Name: SMS M59
- Builder: Deschimag-Werk Seebeck
- Launched: 31 October 1917
- Fate: Sold to Lithuania, 1927

Lithuania
- Name: Prezidentas Smetona
- Namesake: Antanas Smetona, President of Lithuania
- Acquired: purchased, 1927
- Commissioned: 2 August 1935
- Home port: Klaipėda, later Šventoji
- Fate: Seized by the Soviet Union, 1940

Soviet Union
- Name: Pirmūnas (Пирмунас)
- Acquired: 15 June 1940
- Renamed: Korall (Коралл)
- Fate: Sunk, 11 January 1945

General characteristics
- Class & type: M57-class minesweeper
- Displacement: 525–586 tons
- Length: 56 m (183 ft 9 in), wl; 59.3 m (194 ft 7 in), oa
- Beam: 7.4 m (24 ft 3 in)
- Draught: 2.2–2.3 m (7 ft 3 in – 7 ft 7 in)
- Propulsion: 2 Schulz coal-fired boilers
- Speed: 16 knots (30 km/h; 18 mph)
- Complement: 48
- Armament: 2 × 4.1 in (100 mm) guns; 3 × machine guns

The Lithuanian warship Prezidentas Smetona was the only warship of the Lithuanian Navy during the years of the First Republic of Lithuania from 1918 to 1940. It was named after the first President of Lithuania, Antanas Smetona. The ship was originally built with the name SMS M59 as a M1916 Type minesweeper for the Imperial German Navy during the First World War.

After the Soviet occupation of Lithuania in 1940, the ship joined the Soviet Navy, serving as Pirmūnas (Пирмунас), Korall (Коралл) and T-33. It was sunk on 11 January 1945.

== Design and construction ==
The M1916 Type minesweeper was an improved and slightly enlarged derivative of the M1914 and M1915 Type minesweepers which the German Empire had built since 1914. They were fleet minesweepers, seaworthy enough to operate in the open sea, and proved to be successful and reliable in service.

M59 was 59.28 metres (194 ft 6 in) long overall and 57.78 m (189 ft 7 in) at the waterline, with a beam of 7.30 m (23 ft 11 in) and a draught of 2.20 m (7 ft 3 in). The ship had a design displacement of 506 tonnes (498 long tons) and a deep load displacement of 535 t (527 long tons). Two coal-fired water-tube boilers fed steam to two sets of three-cylinder triple expansion steam engines, rated at 1,750 indicated horsepower (1,300 kW), which in turn drove two propeller shafts. Speed was 16 knots (30 km/h; 18 mph). 130 tons of coal was carried, sufficient for a range of 2,000 nautical miles (3,700 km; 2,300 mi) at 14 knots (26 km/h; 16 mph).

As built, M59 had a main gun armament of two 10.5-centimetre (4.1 in) SK L/45 naval guns, (Note: SK stood for Schnellfeuerkanone (quick-firing gun).) while 30 mines could be carried. The ship had a crew of 40.

M59 was laid down at the shipbuilder Deschimag-Werk Seebeck's Geestemünde (now part of Bremerhaven) shipyard as yard number 402. She was launched on 31 October 1917 and entered service on 30 November that year.

== Service ==
=== Germany ===
At the end of 1917, M59 was a member of the 3rd half-flotilla of the 2nd Minesweeping Flotilla. On 23 April 1918, the German High Seas Fleet launched a large-scale sortie into the North Sea, aimed at attacking one of the convoys running between Norway and Britain. Early on 24 April, the battlecruiser Moltke suffered a machinery breakdown and had to be taken into tow by the battleship Oldenburg. The 3rd half-flotilla were deployed to sweep for naval mines ahead of Oldenburg and Moltke as they returned to Germany, and at about midday on 25 April, they had into a minefield. The minesweeper M67 struck one of the mines, which badly damaged the minesweeper, which quickly began to settle. M59 went alongside M67 and took off the minesweeper's surviving crew before M67 sank. Seven of M67's crew were killed in the explosion. M59 remained part of the 3rd half-flotilla of the 2nd Minesweeping Flotilla at the end of the war.

M59 was struck from the German naval lists on 24 October 1921, and on 2 August 1922 was sold to a French company for 1 million Mark.

=== Lithuania ===
In 1927 the vessel was purchased by Lithuania for 289,000 litas. It was used to safeguard Lithuanian shores against smugglers and as a training facility for the navy. In 1939–1940 Lithuania ordered more ships, including submarines, from France.

The 525–586-ton Prezidentas Smetona was 60 metres (196 ft 10 in) in length and was powered by two Schulz coal-fired boilers providing a top speed of 16 knots. A complement of 48 manned two 3-inch (76 mm) guns and three machine guns. The ship was reconstructed and was officially launched as a warship on 2 August 1935 by Captain Antanas Kaškelis.

=== Soviet Union ===
After the German ultimatum to Lithuania in March 1939, Lithuania lost the port of Klaipėda and Prezidentas Smetona had to be docked in Šventoji. Lithuania was occupied by the Soviet Union on 15 June 1940 and the vessel became part of the Soviet Navy. Prezidentas Smetona was renamed first as Пирмунас (Pirmūnas) and later as Коралл (Korall). The warship was reconverted in 1943 to a minesweeper and on 29 August 1944 renamed as T-33. It was sunk on 11 January 1945 when it departed from the port of Helsinki. Circumstances of the sinking are unclear: some claim that it was sunk by the German submarine U-745, others argue that it hit a naval mine, or, according to the diary of a German sailor, was hit by a German torpedo.

Estonian researchers had announced several times in the press that they have located the wreckage in the Gulf of Finland. In 2018, a large original flag of the warship was handed to the Lithuanian Sea Museum by Lithuanian descent collector Henry Gaidis.

== Bibliography ==
- Gardiner, Robert; Gray, Randal, eds. (1985). Conway's All The World's Fighting Ships 1906–1921. London: Conway Maritime Press. ISBN 0-85177-245-5.
- Gladisch, Walter, ed. (1965). Der Krieg in der Nordsee: Band 7: Vom Sommer 1917 bis zum Kriegsende 1918. Der Krieg zur See: 1914–1918 (in German). Frankfurt: Verlag E.S. Mittler & Sohn.
- Gröner, Erich; Jung, Dieter; Maass, Martin (1983). Die deutschen Kriegsschiffe 1815–1945: Band 2: Torpedoboote, Zerstörer, Schnellboote, Minensuchboote, Minenräumboote [German warships 1815–1945: Torpedo boats, Destroyers, Speedboats, Minesweepers, Minesweeper Boats] (in German). Vol. II. Koblenz: Bernard & Graef Verlag. ISBN 3-7637-4801-6.
- Halpern, Paul G. (1994). A Naval History of World War I. London: UCL Press. ISBN 1-85728-498-4.
- Lenton, H. T. (1975). German Warships of the Second World War. London: Macdonald and Jane's. ISBN 0-356-04661-3.
- Stoelzel, Albert (1930). Ehrenrangliste der Kaiserlich Deutschen Marine 1914–1918 (in German). Berlin: Thormann & Goetsch.
