= Lithuanian Navy =

- Lietuvos Karinės jūrų pajėgos
- Insignia of the Lithuanian Navy
- Active: 24 March 1568 (Sea Commission); 1626 (Commission of Royal Ships); 1935–1939, 1992 – present
- Country: Lithuania
- Branch: Navy
- Role: Control, protect and defend territorial sea and exclusive economic zone.
- Size: 700
- Part of: Lithuanian Armed Forces
- Garrison/HQ: Naujoji uosto 24, LT-92244 Klaipėda
- Anniversaries: 1 September 1935; 4 July 1992

Commanders
- Commander in Chief: Sea Captain Tadas Jablonskis

Insignia
- Naval ensign

- Naval jack

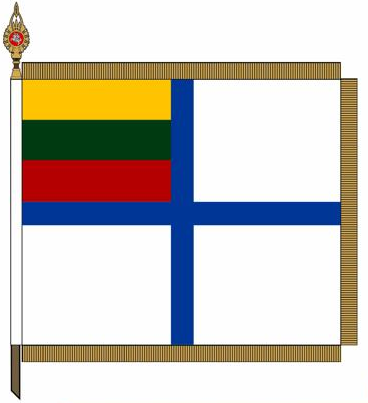
- Banner

The Lithuanian Navy (Lithuanian: Lietuvos Karinės jūrų pajėgos; formally: Lithuanian Naval Forces) is the naval arm of the Lithuanian Armed Forces. Though formally established on 1 August 1935 its roots stretch back as far as naval engagements on the Baltic Sea in the Medieval period. Lithuanian naval units saw some service with Soviet naval forces during World War II, and the Naval Forces has been re-established in its own right and continues to expand since Lithuania's independence in 1990.

== History ==
Although the origin of the Lithuanian Navy dates back to the period between World War I and World War II, the history of the involvement in naval battles existed earlier. The Baltic tribe of Aistians that settled down in the Baltic Sea shore built ships and used them for trade as well as for military purposes. Furthermore, according to annals, in the 13th century other Baltic tribes, the Coronians and Samogitians, tried to destroy the castle of Riga coming by ships. It is also known about the victory of Lithuanians in the ship battle in Nemunas River at the time when Duke Vytenis ruled the Duchy of Lithuania. The most known and important naval victory was achieved by great hetman Jan Karol Chodkiewicz on 24 March 1609 near Salismünde (now Salacgrīva in Latvia) where he defeated a Swedish fleet burning two enemy ships and losing none and hence breaking the blockade of Riga city. But generally the loss of territories near the Baltic Sea had a negative impact on Lithuania's maritime development.

=== Polish–Lithuanian Commonwealth Navy ===
The Commonwealth Navy was small and played a relatively minor role in the history of the Commonwealth. Despite having access to the Baltic Sea, neither Poland nor Lithuania had any significant navy throughout their histories.

==== Fleet creation ====
At the turn of the seventeenth century, Poland became ruled by the House of Vasa, and was involved in a series of wars with Sweden (see also dominium maris baltici). Vasa kings attempted to create a proper fleet, but their attempts met with repeated failures, due to lack of funds in the royal treasury (Polish nobility saw little need for the fleet and refused to raise taxes for its construction, and Gdańsk continued its opposition to the idea of a royal fleet). During the reign of Sigismund III, the most celebrated victory of the Commonwealth Navy under command of Admiral Arend Dickmann took place at the Battle of Oliwa in 1627 against Sweden, during the Polish-Swedish War. The victory over Sweden secured for Poland permanent access to the Atlantic, and laid the foundations for expeditions beyond Europe. The plans for the independent fleet fell through shortly afterwards due to a badly executed alliance with the Habsburgs who in 1629 took over the fleet.

The Commission of Royal Ships (Komisja Okrętów Królewskich) was created in 1625. This commission, along with the ultimate allocation of funds by the Sejm in 1637, attempted to create a permanent Commonwealth Navy. Władysław IV Waza who took the throne in 1632 bought 12 ships, and built a dedicated port for the royal navy (Władysławowo).

==== Plans for expansion ====
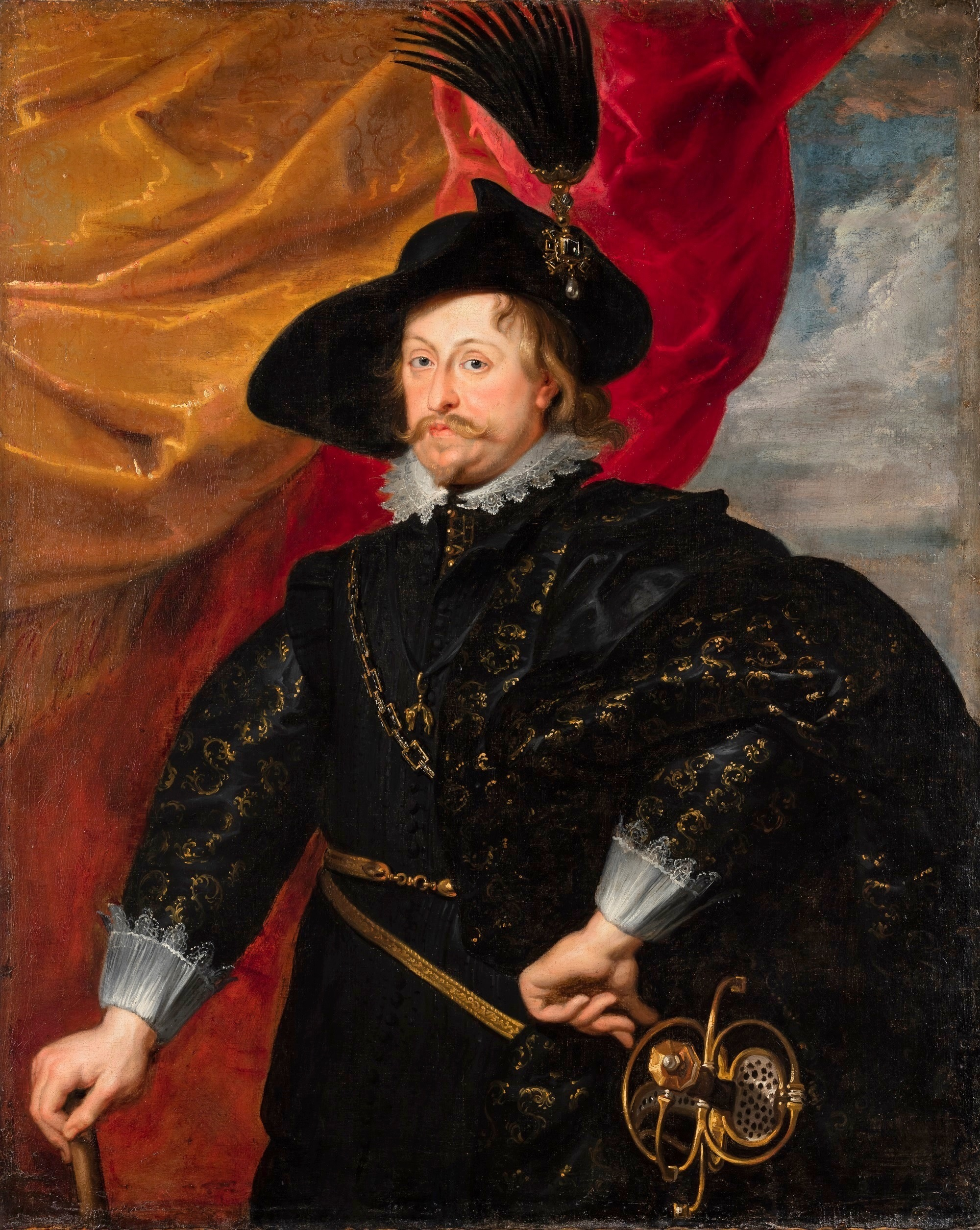
Władysław IV Vasa, by Rubens

The 58th article signed and sworn by king Władysław IV Pacta conventa announced creation of a war fleet "according to needs of Commonwealth". Władysław, taking the throne after his father Sigismund III Vasa died in 1632, was in favour of expanding and modernising the Commonwealth military. One of his plans was the expansion of the Commonwealth Navy.

Despite his attempts he did not recover ships taken by Swedes in Wismar and Travemuende. Władysław decided to build a new fleet and created a "Naval Commission" with Gerard Denhoff as a chairman to fulfill this task. The choice of other members of this Commission was not random, it contained wealthy king supporters, like the merchant and owner of a merchant fleet from Danzig, Georg Hewel (Gdańsk, Jerzy Hewel). Because the Sejm (Polish Diet) was at best reluctant to pay for new ships and royal chest was permanently empty it was due to Hewel that the new fleet was created at all. He gave to the king's disposal 10 ships, a few of them were carrying small caliber cannons. These ships had to be modernized in order to allow them to carry heavier cannons. Additionally the king wanted to build a few galleons in Danzig and Puck and because of long construction times, also to purchase a few ships abroad, but those plans were not realized (except of purchase of one Danish ship - requiring quite serious repair).

Thus the new 'Polish fleet' consisted of 10 ex-merchant ships: "Czarny Orzeł" (Black Eagle – 420 tons, 32 cannons), "Prorok Samuel" (Prophet Samuel – 400 tons, 24 cannons), "Wielkie Słońce" (Great Sun – 540 tons, 24 cannons), "Nowy Czarny Orzeł" (New Black Eagle – 24 cannons). Four smaller ships "Biały Orzeł" (White Eagle), "Charitas", "Gwiazda" (Star) and "Strzelec" (Saggitarius) had 200 tons and two the smallest "Święty Piotr" (Saint Peter) or "Fortuna" (Fortune) 160 tons and "Mały Biały Orzeł" (Small White Eagle) 140 tons and 4 small caliber cannons and additionally one small galley. Command of the newly created fleet was given to rear admiral Aleksander Seton.

The King did not forget to ensure a safe base for the newly created fleet. The Harbor in Puck was too shallow for the biggest ships and the usage of Wisłoujście (a fortress near Gdansk) was constantly plagued by difficulties from the Danzig Patricians (afraid that a king with a strong naval arm would step upon their "liberties", control tolls, exert taxes etc.). The royal engineers Friederich Getkant (Fryderyk Getkant), Jan Pleitner and Eliasz Arciszewski selected a location for two new fortifications with naval bases on the Hel Peninsula. They were quite impressive and raised in record time (finished in 1634, consisting of strong wooden (oak) palisades, earthen walls, trenches and moats). These fortifications were named after the King and his brother: Władysławowo and Kazimierzowo (the small town of Władysławowo still exists on the Hel peninsula nowadays - the fort was more or less on its current edge).

Additionally about 500 Cossacks under Konstanty Kołek with their small boats (Chaika) were brought. It is uncertain if they were used at all. Their main goal was to plague Swedish communication and supply lines near Piława and on Zatoka Wiślana (Vistula Bay). There were plans to use Cossacks in their light but very fast boats against Inflanty (Livonia) and even to raid the Swedish shore (to burn, pillage, capture merchant ships etc.). Cossacks were known from their plundering raids on Black Sea (they even burned suburbs of Istanbul once or twice). Because of the overall tonnage and armament difference between Polish and Swedish naval fleets even before (in 1620s), the main role of the Polish fleet was to disrupt Swedish communication and supply lines, to capture merchant ships bringing supplies for the Swedes (even if they belonged to neutral powers, for example ships belonging to the Netherlands, England or German duchies/cities were captured and sequestrated).

The king's plan never had strong support from Polish nobles (szlachta): high costs and reluctance to strengthen the king's power were always crippling Władysław's plans. Thus not even all the king's expenses for the modernization of those ten ships were fully repaid. Unfortunate international alliances (with Denmark and Muscovy) did not allow him to mount any offensive actions and the majority of the wars he participated in were defensive ones (like the Smolensk War with Muscovy in 1634). A new armistice with Sweden signed in Stumsdorf (Sztumska Wies) knocked the last argument out of the king's hand. After that the king wanted to use his ships to organize the first Polish merchant company (with help of Hewel), however Hewel's death stopped even those plans. Finally the ships were sold. The built fortifications were salt in Denmark's and the Danzig Patriciate eyes and under their pressure were destroyed in 1640s.

The Swedes were without king after the death of Gustavus Adolphus of Sweden and lost battles in Germany. The Polish nobles did not want to fight a new war so when the Swedes returned most of the lands they captured in the previous war, a new armistice for 35 years was signed. The cost of the Polish preparations for this war was comparable with the costs of the king's relief of Smolensk in 1634 and his campaign against Muscovy.

==== Fleet after 1630s ====
The fleet was destroyed in 1637 by Denmark, without declaration of war. The remaining ships were sold in the years 1641-1643, which marked the end of the Commonwealth Navy.

The ships of the Polish–Lithuanian Commonwealth navy included:

- Ritter Sankt Georg (Rycerz Święty Jerzy) ("Knight St George") – galleon, 31 guns, 400t under the command of Johann Storch
- Fliegender Hirsch (Latający Jeleń) ("Flying Deer") – galleon, 20 guns, 300t under the command of Ellert Appelman
- Meerweib (Panna Wodna) ("Sea Virgo") – 12 guns, 160t under the command of Adolf von Arzen
- Schwarzer Rabe (Czarny Kruk) ("Black Raven") – 16 guns, 260t under the command of Alexander Bley
- Gelber Löwe (Żółty Lew) ("Yellow Lion") – 10 guns, 120t under the command of Hans Kizer
- Meermann (Wodnik) ("Aquarius") – galleon, 17 guns, 200t under the command of Hermann Witte
- König David (Król Dawid) ("King David") – galleon, 31 guns, 400t, under James Murray (known to the Poles as Jakub Mora)
- Arche Noah (Arka Noego) ("Noah's Ark") – 16 guns, 180t under the command of Magnus Wesman
- Weißer Löwe (Biały Lew) ("White Lion") – 8 guns, 200t under the command of Peter Böse
- Feuerblase (Płomień) ("Fireblaze") – 18 guns, 240t

=== Interwar period ===
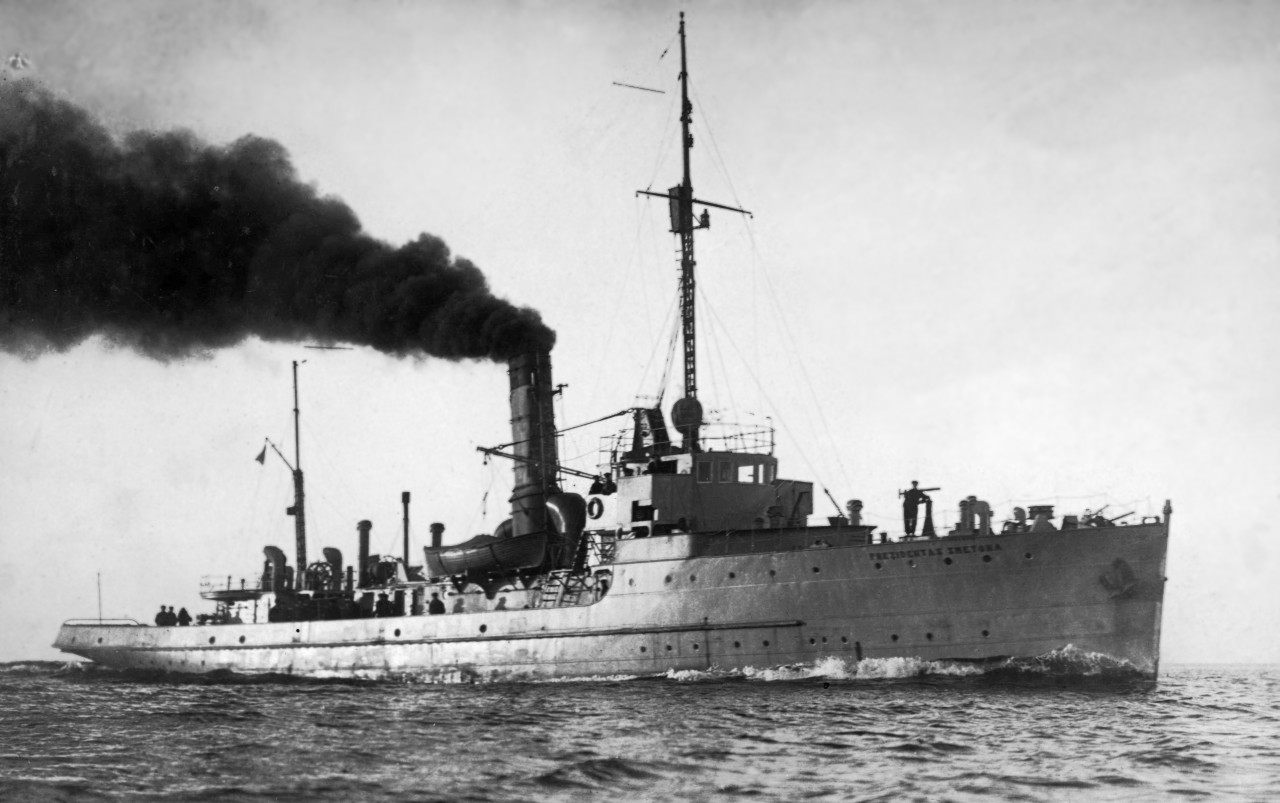
Interwar Lithuanian warship Prezidentas Smetona (1935)

After World War I, the Government of Lithuania attempted to establish a maritime defense force. However, due to various political and economical reasons, the maritime defense force was only partially implemented. In 1923, Lithuania gained the control of Klaipėda harbor and gradual development of the maritime defense force started. The purchase of a minesweeper in 1927 was one of the first significant steps to implement Lithuanian Government aims. The ship was commissioned as the training ship Prezidentas Smetona (President Smetona). Captain Antanas Kaskelis was assigned as ship's commanding officer. Several small boats carried out patrol duties (Coast Guard 3-6 cutter) and one small yacht in Klaipėda harbor. Naval officers were educated abroad. On 1 August 1935, the commander in chief of the Lithuanian Armed Forces, General Stasys Rastikis, officially established the Lithuanian Navy as a branch of the Lithuanian Armed Forces.

=== World War II ===
Before the beginning of World War II on 22 March 1939 the region of Klaipėda was occupied by Germany. Once the war started Lithuanian naval ships were forced to leave Klaipėda for Liepāja harbor in Latvia. During the Soviet occupation, 3 Russian boats blocked ship Prezidentas Smetona in Sventoji harbor (1940). The Lithuanian Navy was attached to the Soviet Union's Baltic maritime defense force. Prezidentas Smetona was renamed Korall and participated in the sea battles against Nazi Germany's Kriegsmarine. On 11 January 1945, the ship triggered a mine and sank in the Gulf of Finland.

=== 1990s ===
After the restoration of independence on 11 March 1990, Lithuania began organization of its Armed Forces. On 4 July 1992 the Lithuanian Navy were re-established and Juozapas Algis Leisis was appointed as a commander of the Coast Guard Squadron. The first commissioned ship in the Lithuanian Navy was the A41 Vėtra, which at that point belonged to the Klaipėda harbour administration. Vėtra was used for SAR and supply operations. In 1992, the Lithuanian Navy received two Grisha-class corvette, Zemaitis (F11) and Aukstaitis (F12) from Russia. After the crew training period in June 1992, both corvettes participated in the international military exercise US BALTOPS 93. This marked the beginning of Lithuania's international cooperation with other navies.

In the period spanning 1992–2000 the Lithuanian Navy received three Storm-class patrol boats from Norway (P31 Dzūkas, P32 Selis, P33 Skalvis), two Lindau-class minehunter from Germany (M51 Kuršis, M52 Sūduvis), a cutter H21 (ex-Vilnele 1983) from the Klaipėda harbor administration, and the boat Lokys (a tug and dive cutter) from Sweden. Another milestone in Lithuanian naval history was the establishment of the Sea Coastal Surveillance Company in 1993 which was then transformed into the Sea Coastal Surveillance Service.

=== 21st century ===
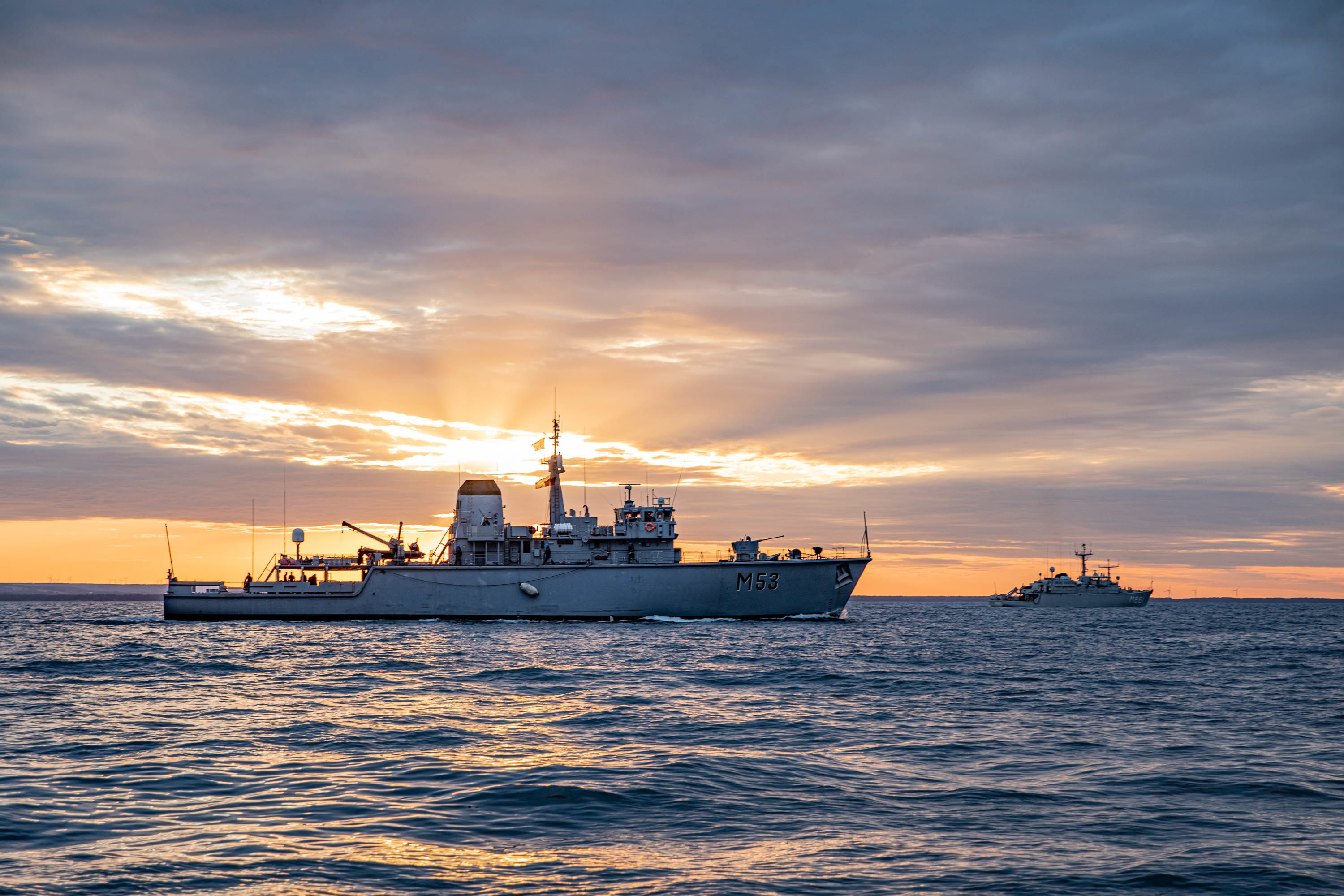
M53 Skalvis during BALTOPS '20

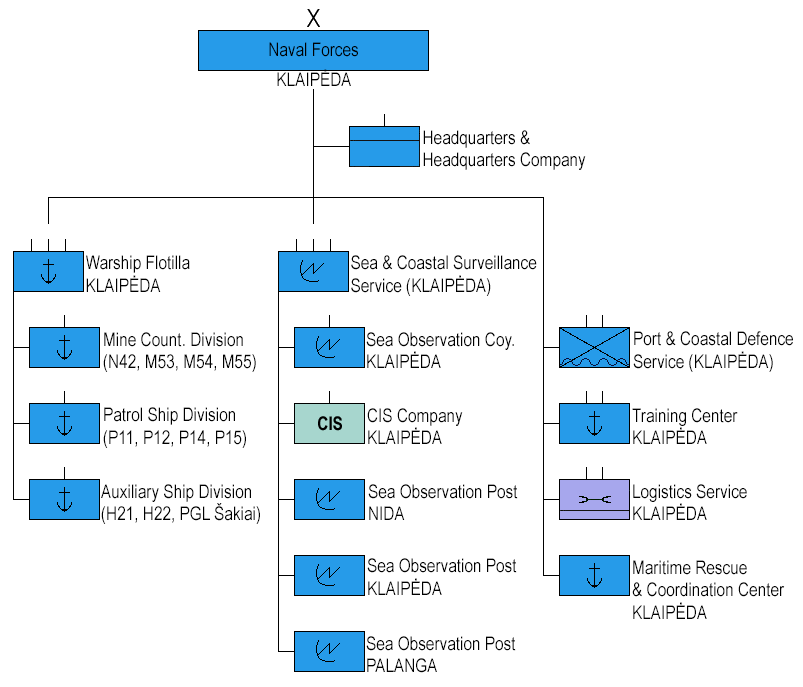
Lithuanian Navy organization 2025

In 2004, Lithuania became an official member of the NATO alliance. In 2006, the Naval Forces acquired the ex-HNoMS Vidar (N52) from the Royal Norwegian Navy. The ship was designated as Jotvingis (N42) and has been serving as a command-and-supply ship. In the period spanning 2008–2016 the Naval Forces bought four Flyvefisken-class patrol vessels from Denmark which received the names P11 Žemaitis, P12 Dzūkas, P14 Aukštaitis and P15 Sėlis. The Naval Forces also received SAR ship Šakiai which was transferred from the Klaipėda harbour administration. In 2013, ex-HMS Cottesmore and ex-HMS Dulverton were acquired, modernized and commissioned as M53 Skalvis and M54 Kuršis. Both are used in the Mine Countermeasures Squadron.

In May 2020, it was announced that the procurement of a third Hunt-class minehunter for the Lithuanian Navy was approved by the UK defense ministry. In April 2022, it was announced that the Navy will acquire Jehu-class patrol boats from Finland. In May 2025, the Lithuanian defence minister announced the plans to buy Vanguard-class multirole warships from Norway.

==== Marine fusiliers ====
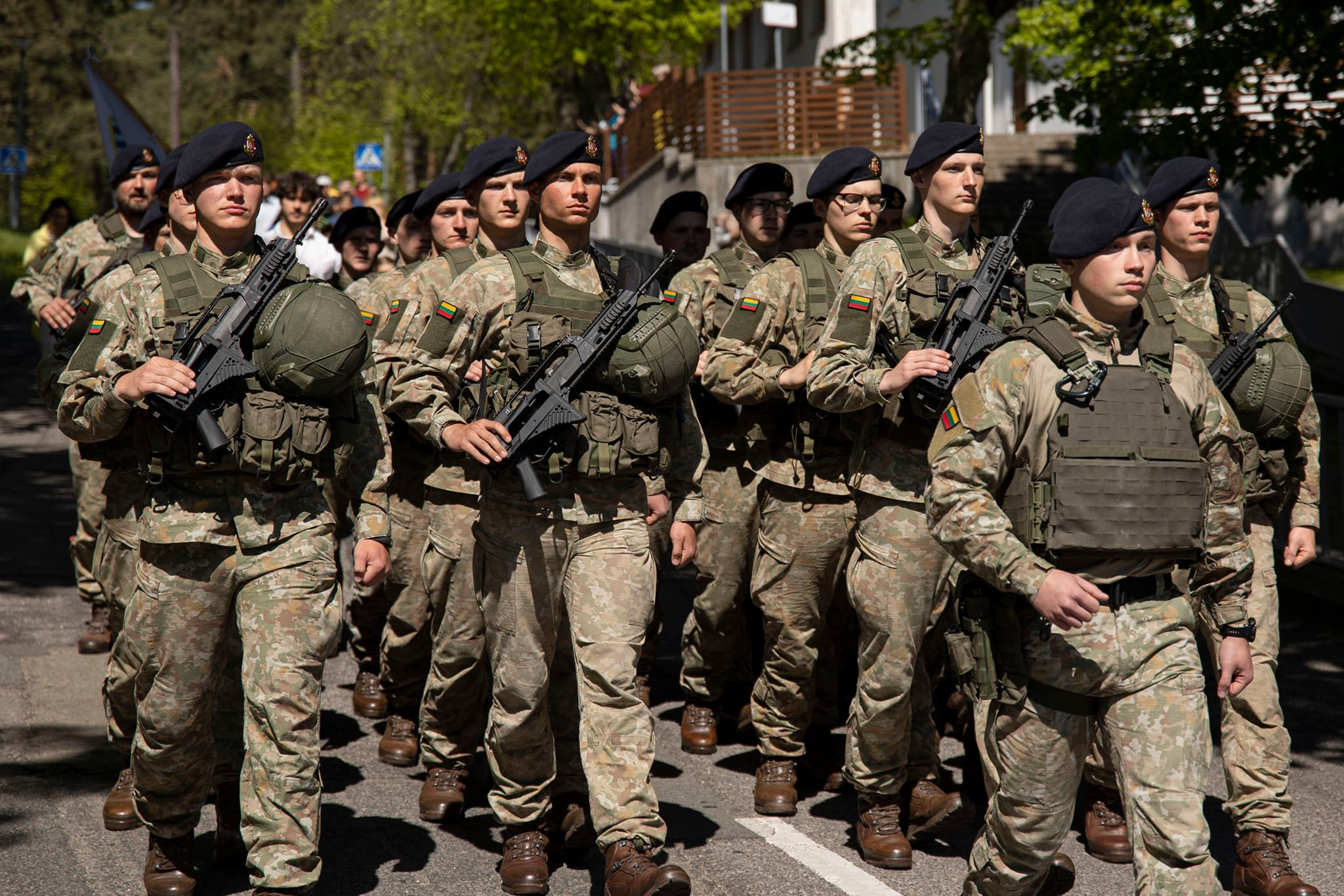
Marine fusiliers of the Naval Force

From 1994 to 1999, the 7th Dragoons Coastal Defense Battalion performed marine infantry tasks. It belonged to the Naval Forces, participated in international operations and exercises, and was later integrated into the Land Forces.

From 1 August 2022, in order to eliminate the coastal and port defense gap and perform other functions assigned to the marines, the Naval Forces Port and Coastal Defense Service was established and partially formed by merging the Explosive Ordnance Disposal (EOD) Divers Team and the Naval Forces Logistics Service Security Company into one structure, which includes two infantry (fusilier) companies. In the process of forming the unit's traditions, the soldiers serving in the unit began to be called marine fusiliers (marine infantry), and the service itself is unofficially called the Fusilier Battalion.

In April 2025, the Navy announced that the marine unit would be officially renamed the General Kazimieras Nestoras Sapiega Fusiliers Battalion and would continue the traditions of the 7th Fusiliers Regiment.

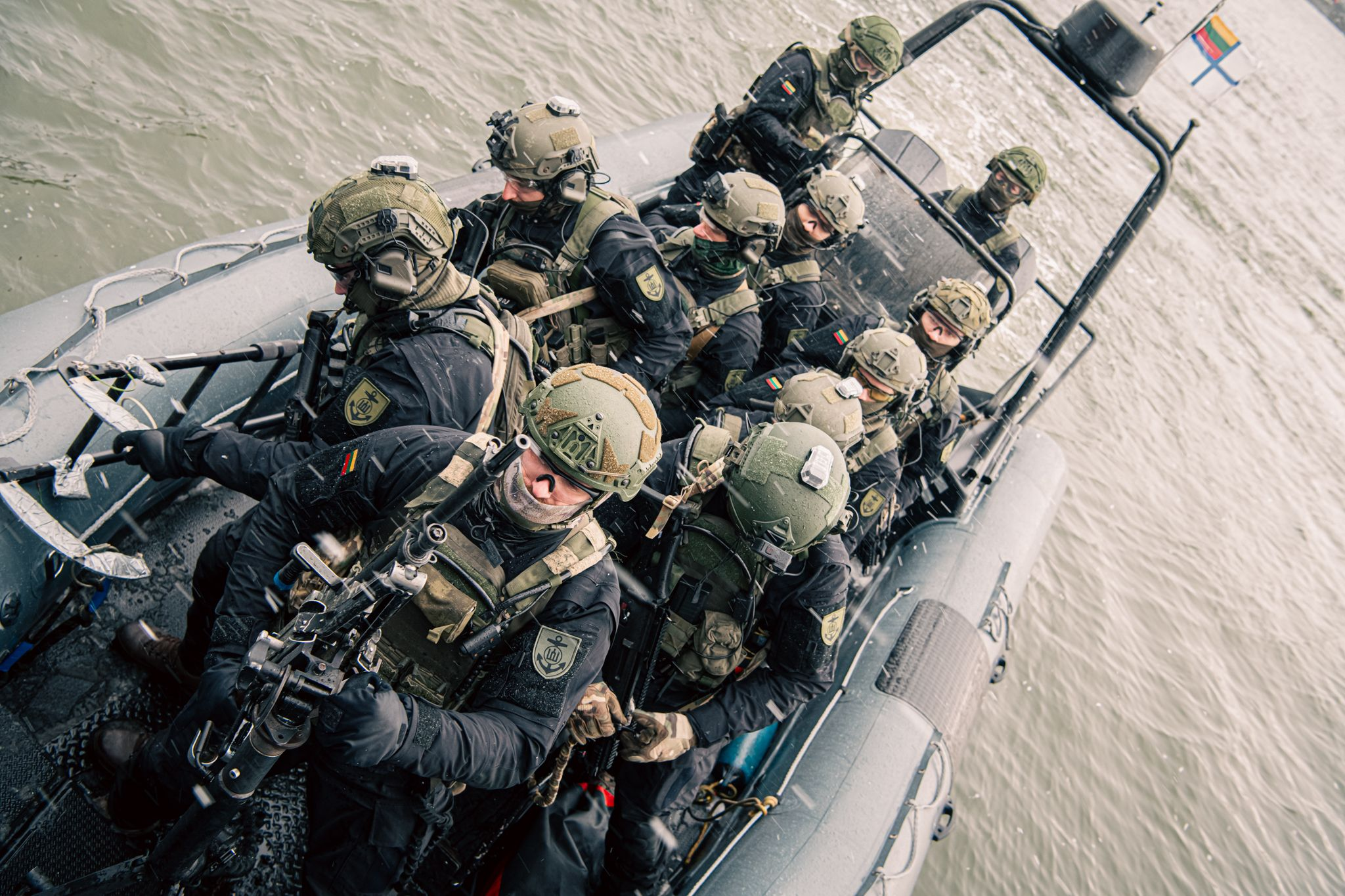
Shallow Water Team during "Unified Response '25" exercise

General Kazimieras Nestoras Sapiega Fusiliers Battalion consists of:

- Headquarters;
- 1st Infantry Company;
- 2nd Infantry Company;
- Shallow Water Team;
- Underwater Operations Team;
- Communications and Information Systems Platoon;
- Coastal Defense Platoon.

== Function ==
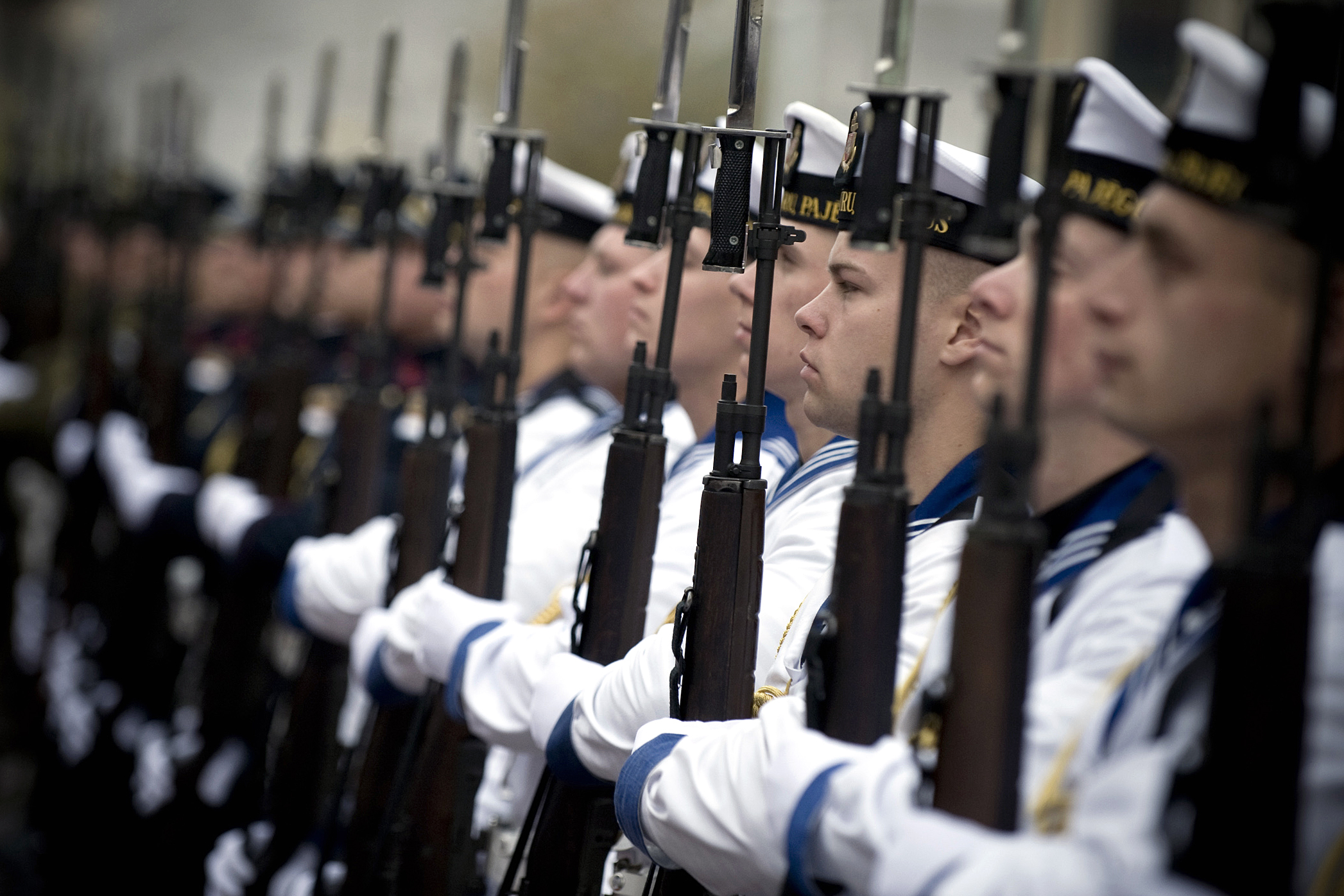
Naval Forces Honor Guard sailors in Vilnius, Lithuania

Main tasks of the Lithuanian Navy are:

- Control, protect and defend territorial sea and exclusive economic zone of the Republic of Lithuania.
- Underwater, surface surveillance and control of territorial waters.
- Mine-clearing operations.
- Anti-terrorism activities at sea.
- Protection and control of shipping and sea line of communications.
- SAR operations.

== Fleet and equipment ==
=== Current fleet ===
Class	In service	Origin	Picture	Type	Builder	Ship	No.	Comm.	Displacement	Notes
Mine Countermeasures Squadron
Vidar-class	1	Norway		Minelayer and command vessel	Mjellem & Karlsen Verft	Jotvingis (former HNoMS Vidar)	N42	2006 (1977 - 2005)	1,750 tonnes	Second-hand from Norway.
Hunt-class	3	United Kingdom		Mine countermeasures vessel	Yarrow Shipbuilders	Skalvis (former HMS Cottesmore)	M53	2011 (1983 - 2005)	750 tonnes	Second-hand from UK.
Hunt-class	3	United Kingdom		Mine countermeasures vessel	Vosper Thornycroft	Kuršis (former HMS Dulverton)	M54	2011 (1983 - 2004)	750 tonnes	Second-hand from UK.
Hunt-class	3	United Kingdom		Mine countermeasures vessel / search and rescue	Vosper Thornycroft	Sūduvis (former HMS Quorn)	M55	– (1989 - 2017)	750 tonnes	Second-hand from UK. Acquired in 2020, currently undergoing modernisation.
Patrol Ships Squadron
Flyvefisken-class (Standard Flex 300)	4	Denmark		Patrol vessel	Danyard, Aalborg	Žemaitis (former HDMS Flyvefisken)	P11	2008 (1989 - 2008)	450 tonnes	Purchased second-hand from Denmark.
Flyvefisken-class (Standard Flex 300)	4	Denmark		Patrol vessel	Danyard, Aalborg	Dzūkas (former HDMS Hajen)	P12	2009 (1990 - 2009)	450 tonnes	Purchased second-hand from Denmark.
Flyvefisken-class (Standard Flex 300)	4	Denmark		Patrol vessel	Danyard, Aalborg	Aukštaitis (former HDMS Lommen)	P14	2010 (1994 - 2010)	450 tonnes	Purchased second-hand from Denmark.
Flyvefisken-class (Standard Flex 300)	4	Denmark		Patrol vessel	Danyard, Aalborg	Sėlis (former HDMS Havkatten)	P15	2016 (1988 - 2012)	450 tonnes	Purchased second-hand from Denmark.
Vanguard-class	0 (+ 4 on order)	Norway	–	Multirole vessel	Kongsberg Gruppen	–	–	–	–	
Vanguard-class	0 (+ 4 on order)	Norway	–	Multirole vessel	Kongsberg Gruppen	–	–	–	–	
Vanguard-class	0 (+ 4 on order)	Norway	–	Multirole vessel	Kongsberg Gruppen	–	–	–	–	
Vanguard-class	0 (+ 4 on order)	Norway	–	Multirole vessel	Kongsberg Gruppen	–	–	–	–	
Fast assault craft - Group (Fusiliers Battalion)
Watercat M18-Class	0 (+ 2 on order)	Finland		Fast attack boat	Marine Alutech Oy AB	–	–	–	32 tonnes	Selected in 2022, ordered in 2025, to be equipped with Spike NLOS and a RCWS.
Watercat M18-Class	0 (+ 2 on order)	Finland		Fast attack boat	Marine Alutech Oy AB	–	–	–	32 tonnes	Selected in 2022, ordered in 2025, to be equipped with Spike NLOS and a RCWS.
Storebro SB90E- class	1	Sweden		Fast patrol boat	Storebro Bruk AB	Žaibas	P351	2023 (1997 - 2022)	6.5 tonnes	Boats acquired from the Port of Klaipėda in 2023.
Auxiliary Ships Squadron
–	1	Netherlands		Search and rescue boat / multi-function	Damen Workboats B.V.	–	–		–	In October 2026, a €50 mln contract was signed for a new ship to be built by the Damen Workboats B.V.
–	1	Soviet Union		Search and rescue boat	–	PGL Šakiai	–	2009 (1986 - 2009)	–	Transferred from the Klaipėda harbour administration. To be replaced with a new SAR ship by 2029.
–	1	Soviet Union		Harbour tugboat (Used in support vessel / cutter roal)	–	Vilnelė	H21	1992 (1983 - 1992)	–	Inherited from the USSR. Received from the Klaipėda harbour administration.
–	1	Sweden		Harbour tugboat (Can be used in an icebreaker role)	–	Atlas	H22	2000 (1955 - 2000)	–	Donated by the Swedish Navy to the Lithuanian government in 2000.
ASD 3010 ICE-class	1	Netherlands		Harbour tugboat	Damen Schelde	Lokys	H24	2025	60 tonnes	Ordered in August 2024. Delivered in May 2025.

=== Weapons ===
Model	Quantity in service	Origin	Picture	Type	Notes
Naval mines
Forcit Blocker Influence Sea Mine System	0 (+ N/A quantity on order)	Finland		Seabed naval mine	Ordered in November 2026. Equipped with multiple sensors (acoustic, E/O-IR, magnetic, pressure, inertiel, UEP). The mines can be laid from most Lithuanian Naval platforms. Capacity: 1,000 kg TNT equivalent.

=== Retired ships ===
The list of retired ships includes: Grisha III-class corvettes (F11 Žemaitis, F12 Aukštaitis), Storm-class patrol boats (P31 Dzūkas, P32 Selis, P33 Skalvis), Lindau-class mine hunters (M51 Kuršis, M52 Sūduvis); support ships and cutters (A41 Vėtra, H23 Lokys). Most of these ships have been scrapped.

== Ranks and insignia ==
=== Officers ===
The rank insignia for commissioned officers for the Naval Forces.

NATO code	OF-10	OF-9	OF-8	OF-7	OF-6	OF-5	OF-4	OF-3	OF-2	OF-1
		General officers (Generolai)				Senior officers (Vyresnieji karininkai)			Junior officers (Jaunesnieji karininkai)
Lithuanian Naval Force
Lithuanian Naval Force		Admirolas	Viceadmirolas	Kontradmirolas	Flotilės admirolas	Jūrų kapitonas	Komandoras	Komandoras leitenantas	Kapitonas leitenantas	Vyresnysis leitenantas	Leitenantas
Limitation (as of 2012)		< 9				< 30	< 127	< 375	N/A
NATO code	OF-10	OF-9	OF-8	OF-7	OF-6	OF-5	OF-4	OF-3	OF-2	OF-1

=== Enlisted ===
The rank insignia for enlisted personnel for the navy.

NATO code	OR-9	OR-8	OR-7	OR-6	OR-5	OR-4	OR-3	OR-2	OR-1
Lithuanian Naval Force
Lithuanian Naval Force	Vyresnysis laivūnas	Laivūnas	Štabo laivūnas	Vyresnysis seržantas	Seržantas	Grandinis	Vyresnysis jūreivis	Jūreivis	Jaunesnysis jūreivis
NATO code	OR-9	OR-8	OR-7	OR-6	OR-5	OR-4	OR-3	OR-2	OR-1

== Sources ==
- Hackett, James, ed. (14 February 2022). "The 2022 Military Balance Chart". The Military Balance. 122 (1). International Institute for Strategic Studies. ISSN 0459-7222.

== Sources ==
- Lithuanian Ministry of Defence site
