= Operation Sunbeam =

Series of 1960s US nuclear tests

- Sunbeam Little Feller I. 0.018 kilotons.

Information
- Country: United States
- Test site: NTS Area 18, Buckboard Mesa; NTS Areas 5, 11, Frenchman Flat
- Period: 1962
- Number of tests: 4
- Test type: cratering, dry surface, gun deployed, tower
- Max. yield: 1.6 kilotonnes of TNT (6.7 TJ)

Test series chronology

Operation Sunbeam (also known as Operation Dominic II) was a series of four nuclear tests conducted at the United States's Nevada Test Site in 1962. Operation Sunbeam tested tactical nuclear warheads; the most notable was the Davy Crockett.

The chief milestone of Operation Sunbeam was that it was the last nuclear test series on the Nevada Test Site conducted in the atmosphere by the United States. Since Operation Sunbeam, specifically the Little Feller 1 test of the Davy Crockett, all US nuclear tests on the Test Site have been carried out underground in accordance with the Partial Test Ban Treaty.

== List of the nuclear tests ==
United States' Sunbeam series tests and detonations
Name (Note: The US, France and Great Britain have code-named their test events, while the USSR and China did not, and therefore have only test numbers (with some exceptions – Soviet peaceful explosions were named). Word translations into English in parentheses unless the name is a proper noun. A dash followed by a number indicates a member of a salvo event. The US also sometimes named the individual explosions in such a salvo test, which results in "name1 – 1(with name2)". If test is canceled or aborted, then the row data like date and location discloses the intended plans, where known.)	Date time (UT)	Local time zone (Note: To convert the UT time into standard local, add the number of hours in parentheses to the UT time; for local daylight saving time, add one additional hour. If the result is earlier than 00:00, add 24 hours and subtract 1 from the day; if it is 24:00 or later, subtract 24 hours and add 1 to the day. Historical time zone data obtained from the IANA time zone database.)	Location (Note: Rough place name and a latitude/longitude reference; for rocket-carried tests, the launch location is specified before the detonation location, if known. Some locations are extremely accurate; others (like airdrops and space blasts) may be quite inaccurate. "~" indicates a likely pro-forma rough location, shared with other tests in that same area.)	Elevation + height (Note: Elevation is the ground level at the point directly below the explosion relative to sea level; height is the additional distance added or subtracted by tower, balloon, shaft, tunnel, air drop or other contrivance. For rocket bursts the ground level is "N/A". In some cases it is not clear if the height is absolute or relative to ground, for example, Plumbbob/John. No number or units indicates the value is unknown, while "0" means zero. Sorting on this column is by elevation and height added together.)	Delivery (Note: Atmospheric, airdrop, balloon, gun, cruise missile, rocket, surface, tower, and barge are all disallowed by the Partial Nuclear Test Ban Treaty. Sealed shaft and tunnel are underground, and remained useful under the PTBT. Intentional cratering tests are borderline; they occurred under the treaty, were sometimes protested, and generally overlooked if the test was declared to be a peaceful use.) Purpose (Note: Include weapons development, weapon effects, safety test, transport safety test, war, science, joint verification and industrial/peaceful, which may be further broken down.)	Device (Note: Designations for test items where known, "?" indicates some uncertainty about the preceding value, nicknames for particular devices in quotes. This category of information is often not officially disclosed.)	Yield (Note: Estimated energy yield in tons, kilotons, and megatons. A ton of TNT equivalent is defined as 4.184 gigajoules (1 gigacalorie).)	Fallout (Note: Radioactive emission to the atmosphere aside from prompt neutrons, where known. The measured species is only iodine-131 if mentioned, otherwise it is all species. No entry means unknown, probably none if underground and "all" if not; otherwise notation for whether measured on the site only or off the site, where known, and the measured amount of radioactivity released.)	References	Notes
Little Feller II	July 7, 1962 19:00:??	PST (–8 hrs)	NTS 37.11906°N 116.30381°W	1,566 m (5,138 ft) + 1 m (3 ft 3 in)	dry surface, weapon effect	W54	22 t	I-131 venting detected, 0		Used a stockpile Davy Crockett warhead. The Army's part of Sunbeam was Operation Ivy Flats.
Johnnie Boy	July 11, 1962 16:45:00.09	PST (–8 hrs)	NTS 37.12216°N 116.33395°W	1,572 m (5,157 ft)–0.6 m (2 ft 0 in)	cratering, weapon effect	W30 TADM	500 t	Venting detected off site		TADM (Tactical Atomic Demolition Munition) test, similar to Plumbbob Stokes.
Small Boy	July 14, 1962 18:30:??	PST (–8 hrs)	NTS Area 5 36.798°N 115.932°W	940 m (3,080 ft) + 3 m (9.8 ft)	tower, weapon effect		1.7 kt	I-131 venting detected, 270 kCi (10,000 TBq)		Test of missile silo hardening principles, specifically EMP, similar to Nougat Ermine, Chinchilla I/II, Armadillo.
Little Feller I	July 17, 1962 17:00:??	PST (–8 hrs)	Launch from NTS Area 18, Buckboard Mesa 37.08607°N 116.32977°W, elv: 1,630 + 2 m (5,347.8 + 6.6 ft); Detonation over NTS 37.10946°N 116.31823°W	2,550 m (8,370 ft) + 1 m (3 ft 3 in)	gun deployed, weapon effect	W54	18 t	Venting detected off site, 3 kCi (110 TBq)		Army Operation Ivy Flats, witnessed by Robert Kennedy. Last atmospheric test at NTS, used a stockpile Davy Crockett warhead.
