= BeNeSam =

Joint Belgian-Dutch naval programme

BeNeSam (Belgisch-Nederlandse Samenwerking, Belgium-Netherlands Cooperation Accord) is the name of the Belgian-Dutch naval cooperation.

== History ==
The history of Belgian-Dutch naval cooperation goes back to 1948, when the idea of a joint staff occurred. In a secret military treaty both countries agreed to submit the Royal Netherlands Navy and the Belgian Navy to the command of a single officer in wartime because both navies would operate in the same sea area. This agreement was formalized when NATO activated Allied Command Channel (ACCHAN) in 1953. One of three subordinate commands of ACCHAN was the Benelux Sub-Area Channel Command (BENECHAN) based in Den Helder and consisting of the Belgian and Dutch navies.

Shortly after the end of the Cold War Belgium and the Netherlands signed an agreement settling the cooperation between the Belgian and Dutch navies in 1995, as well in peacetime as in wartime. As a result of this agreement the operational staffs of both navies were integrated in a joint staff under the command of the Admiral Benelux headquartered in Den Helder from 1 January 1996 on. It led to a unique form of cooperation of both navies in operational matters, training, logistics and maintenance. Both countries remain fully sovereign concerning the deployment of their forces.

== Current Belgian-Dutch naval cooperation ==
Next to the "Benelux Admiralty" the BeNeSam agreements also involve other forms of cooperation. The minehunters and frigates have been operating jointly for a number of years and a Belgian helicopter is regularly aboard a Dutch frigate. Joint training has taken place since 1975 at the binational school for mine counter measures Eguermin in Ostend. This school is also a NATO Centre of Excellence. The Mine Counter Measures Operational Sea Training takes place in Zeebrugge. There, ships are assessed if they are ready to enter operational service. Furthermore, operators and liaison staff of both navies have been jointly trained at the Belgian-Dutch Operational School since 1996. Naval cooks and waiters of both navies are trained in Bruges. As far as technical naval trainings are still done separately the two navies have had a joint curriculum since 2010.

The Belgian and Dutch M-frigates and minehunters are operationally led by the binational naval headquarter in Den Helder. Belgium is in charge of the training of the crews of vessels specialised in mine warfare and responsible for the logistics and maintenance of these vessels. The Netherlands perform these tasks for the M-frigates.

== Future ==
After a year of intense consultations, the defence ministers of Belgium, the Netherlands and Luxembourg signed the Benelux Declaration on Defence Cooperation on 18 April 2012. This declaration expands the 1987 Benelux agreement on cooperation and coordination in defence matters. The Belgian Defence minister Pieter De Crem said at that ceremony that "we are en route to a totally new structure with a trinational command. This is a first step to a full integration of assets and joint operability." Dutch Defence Minister Hans Hillen declared that BeNeSam was an extraordinary base to build upon. He didn't reject the idea of mixed crews. Earlier that week, Hillen had also said on Belgian radio that it is not impossible that the three armed forces could be integrated into "Benelux Armed Forces" one day.
