= Jan-Willem Kelder =

Royal Netherlands Navy officer (1949–2021)

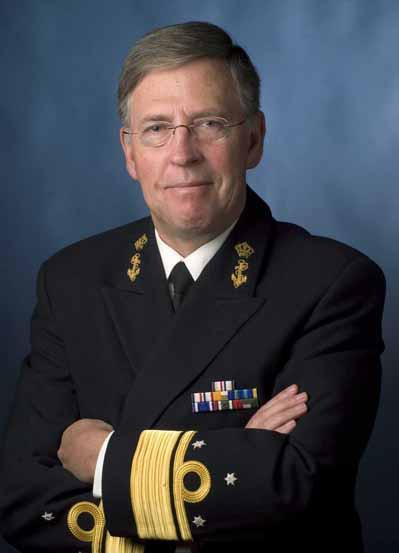
- Kelder in 2005

Commander of the Royal Netherlands Navy
- In office 5 September 2005 – 31 August 2007
- Preceded by: Vice Admiral Ruurt Klaver
- Succeeded by: Lieutenant General Rob Zuiderwijk

Personal details
- Born: 31 May 1949 Semarang, Indonesia
- Died: 7 March 2021 (aged 71) The Hague, Netherlands

Military service
- Allegiance: Netherlands
- Branch/service: Royal Netherlands Navy
- Years of service: ?–2009
- Rank: Vice admiral

Vice Admiral Jan-Willem Kelder (31 May 1949 – 7 March 2021) was a Royal Netherlands Navy officer who is a former Commander of the Royal Netherlands Navy and Admiral Benelux.

== High command ==
From 2002 to 2005 Kelder served as deputy Commander of the naval forces. He was promoted to Commander of the Royal Netherlands Navy on 5 September 2005. He was succeeded by Lieutenant General Rob Zuiderwijk on 31 August 2007.

== Personal life ==
Kelder was married and had two children and four grandchildren. He died on 7 March 2021 after a short illness.
