= Commander of the Navy (Belgium) =

- Ensign of the Navy
- Incumbent; Jan De Beurme since 28 September 2020
- Reports to: Chief of Defence; Admiral Benelux
- Formation: 1831; 1939
- Abolished: 1862

The Commander of the Belgian Navy (French: Commandant de la Composante Marine) is the head of the Naval operations and the administrative head in the Belgian Navy, and is under the Chief of Defence. The current commander is Jan De Beurme.

== List of officeholders ==
=== 1939–present ===
No.	Portrait	Name (Birth–Death)	Term of office			Ref.
No.	Portrait	Name (Birth–Death)	Took office	Left office	Time in office	Ref.
		Flotilla admiral L. J. J. Robins	1 July 1955	31 March 1962	6 years, 273 days	
		Flotilla admiral Louis F. R. Petijean (1901–?)	1 April 1962	19 December 1963	1 year, 262 days	
		Flotilla admiral L. L. J. Lurquin (1914–?)	20 December 1963	31 March 1973	9 years, 101 days	
		Flotilla admiral Vam J. P. L. Van Dyck (1919–1995)	1 April 1973	30 September 1980	7 years, 182 days	
		Vice admiral Avi A. J. P. Schlim (1926–?)	1 October 1980	31 December 1985	5 years, 91 days	
		Vice admiral Edmond Poullet (1928–2020)	1 January 1986	30 September 1989	3 years, 272 days	
		Vice admiral Jozef De Wilde (1931–?)	1 October 1989	31 December 1992	3 years, 91 days	
		Vice admiral Willy Herteleer (born 1941)	1 January 1993	30 September 1995	2 years, 272 days	
		Vice admiral Michel Verhulst (born 1942)	1 October 1995	30 June 2001	5 years, 272 days	
		Vice admiral Michel Hellemans (born 1951)	1 July 2001	31 December 2001	183 days	
		Divisional admiral Willy Goethals	1 January 2002	31 December 2005	3 years, 364 days	
		Divisional admiral Jean-Paul Robyns	1 January 2006	30 June 2011	5 years, 180 days	
		Divisional admiral Michel Hofman (born 1961)	30 June 2011	6 May 2015	3 years, 310 days	
		Divisional admiral Georges Heeren	6 May 2015	20 September 2016	1 year, 137 days	
		Divisional admiral Wim Robberecht (born 1962)	20 September 2016	28 September 2020	4 years, 8 days	
		Divisional admiral Jan De Beurme (born 1965)	28 September 2020	Incumbent	6 years, 21 days	
