= Rob Zuiderwijk =

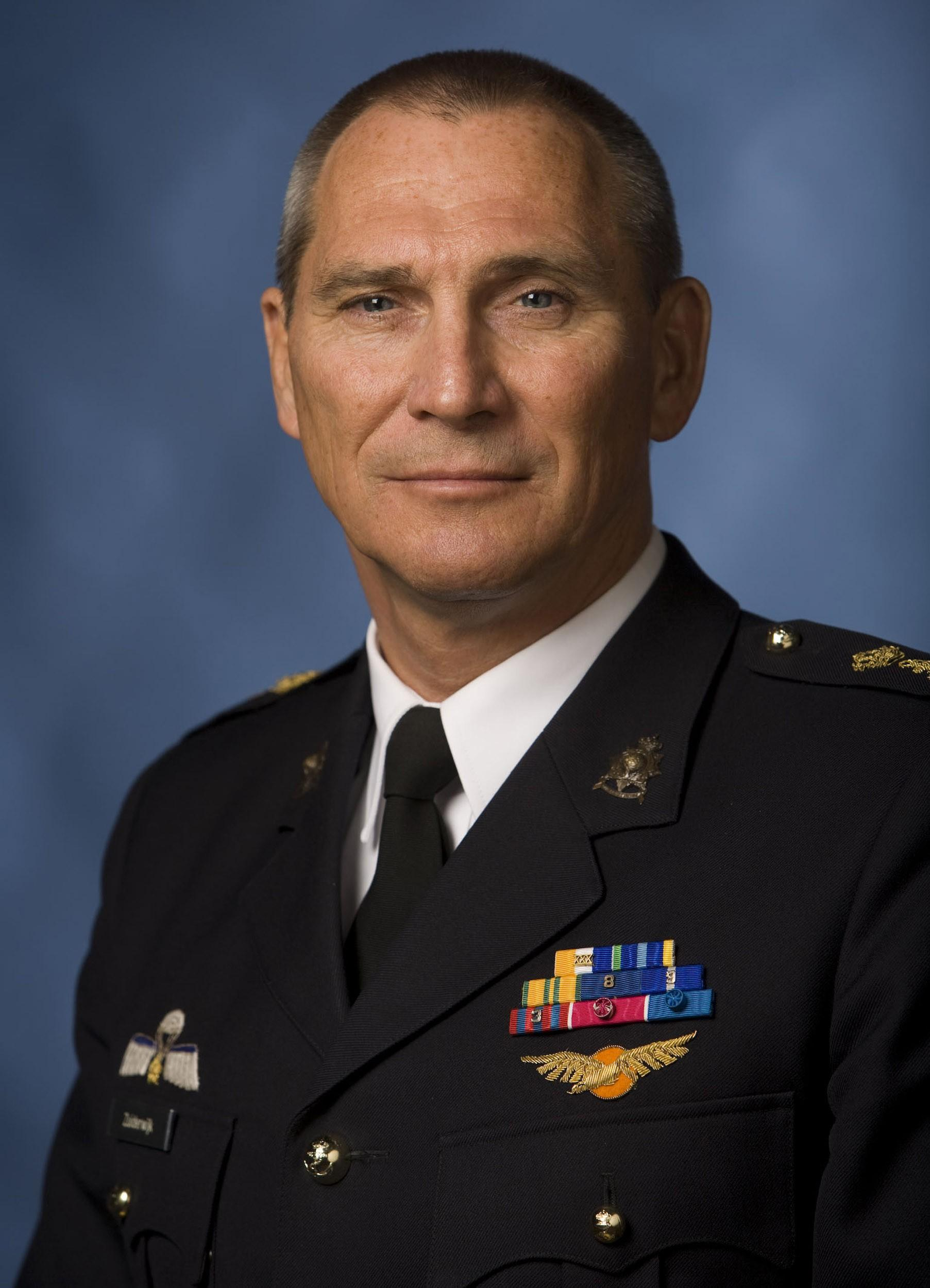
- Lieutenant General Rob Zuiderwijk in 2007

Commander of the Royal Netherlands Navy
- In office 31 August 2007 – 22 January 2010
- Preceded by: Vice Admiral Jan-Willem Kelder
- Succeeded by: Vice Admiral Matthieu Borsboom

Commander of the Royal Netherlands Marine Corps
- In office 9 sep 2004 – 24 aug 2007
- Preceded by: Lieutenant General Willem Prins
- Succeeded by: Brigadier General Rob Verkerk

Commander of the Navy in the Caribbean
- In office 4 July 2001 – 28 June 2004
- Preceded by: Brigadier General Willem Prins
- Succeeded by: Commandeur Frank Sijtsma

Personal details
- Born: 13 January 1951 (age 75) The Hague

Military service
- Allegiance: Netherlands
- Branch/service: Royal Netherlands Navy
- Years of service: 1968-2010
- Rank: Lieutenant General

Lieutenant General Rob Zuiderwijk (born 13 January 1951) is a retired Royal Netherlands Navy officer who is a former Commander of the Royal Netherlands Navy and Admiral Benelux.

== High command ==
Zuiderwijk succeeded Brigadier General Willem Prins on 4 July 2001 as commander of the Dutch naval forces in the Caribbean. After getting promoted to Major General in 2004, he became commander of the Royal Netherlands Marine Corps. In 2007 Zuiderwijk was again promoted, this time to Lieutenant General as he became Commander of the Royal Netherlands Navy. In 2010 he was succeeded by Vice Admiral Matthieu Borsboom.
