= Rob Kramer =

Dutch military commander

Vice Admiral Rob Kramer
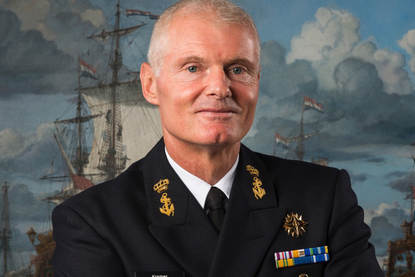

Commander of the Royal Netherlands Navy
- In office 22 September 2017 – 9 September 2021
- Preceded by: Lieutenant General Rob Verkerk
- Succeeded by: Vice Admiral René Tas

Personal details
- Born: 1962 (age 63–64) Kampen
- Spouse: Colette Kramer

Military service
- Allegiance: Netherlands
- Branch/service: Royal Netherlands Navy
- Years of service: 1981—2021
- Rank: Vice admiral
- Commands: Royal Netherlands Navy; HNLMS Evertsen (F805)

Vice Admiral Rob A. Kramer is a retired Royal Netherlands Navy officer who served as the 5th Commander of the Royal Netherlands Navy and Admiral Benelux from 22 September 2017 until his retirement on 9 September 2021. He was succeeded by René Tas

== Personal life ==
Kramer is married to Colette E. Kramer with two children.

== Military decorations ==
- Commemorative Medal for Peace Operations
- Officers' Cross
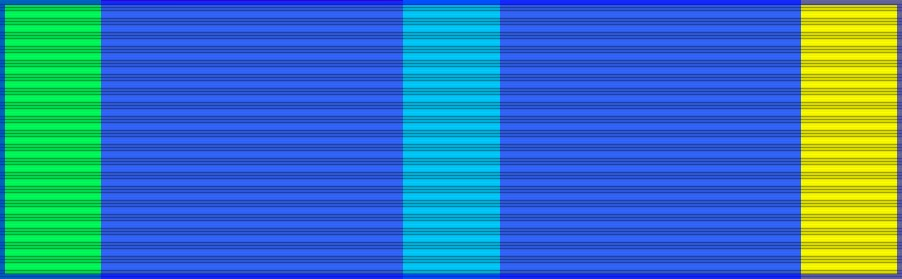
- Navy medal
- Cross for demonstrated marching skills
- National sport medal
- NATO Medal
- Officer in the Legion of Honour
