= Matthieu Borsboom =

Dutch admiral

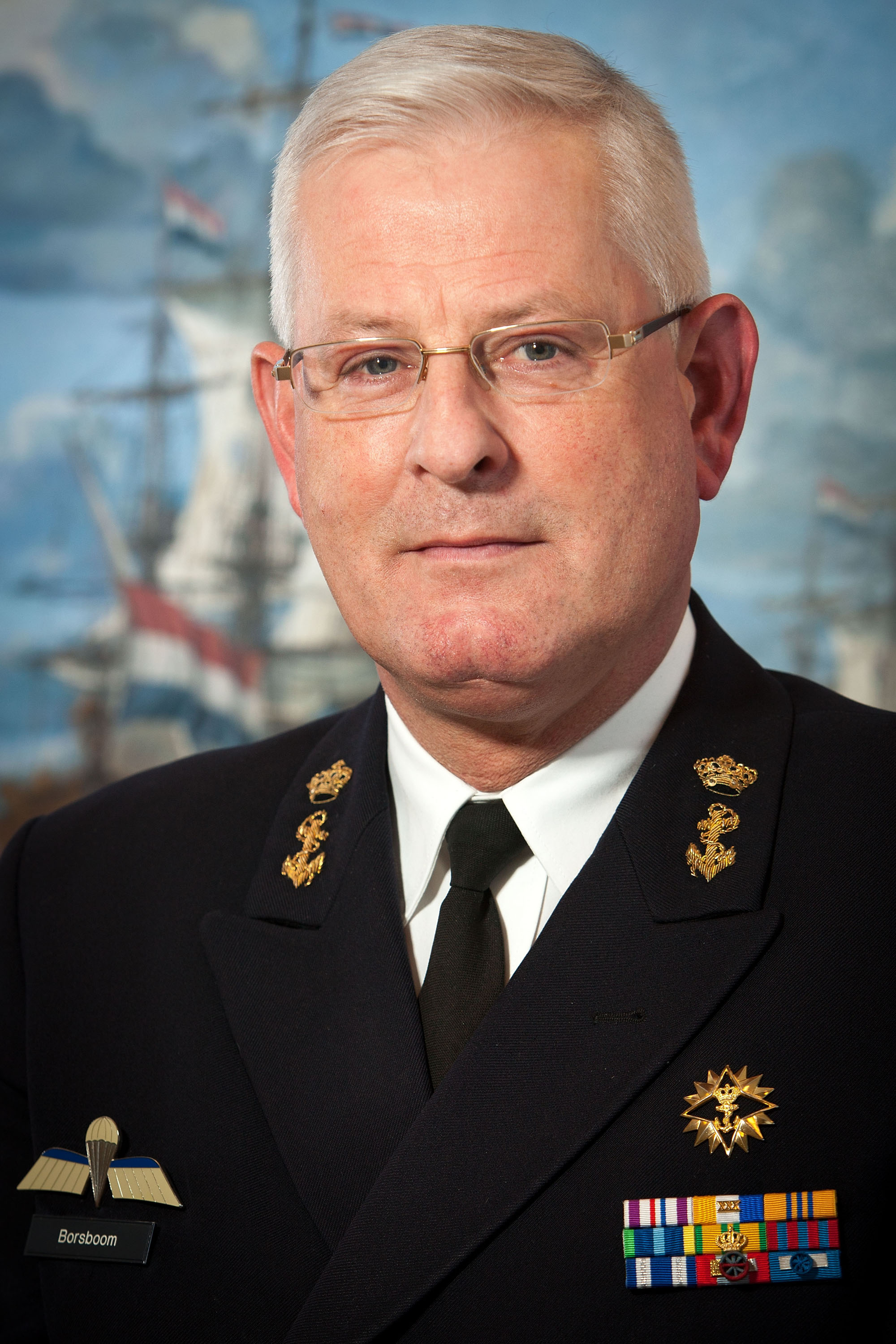
- Vice admiral Borsboom in 2013

Commander of the Royal Netherlands Navy
- In office 22 January 2010 – 26 September 2014
- Preceded by: Lieutenant General Rob Zuiderwijk
- Succeeded by: Lieutenant General Rob Verkerk

Personal details
- Born: 1959 (age 66–67) The Hague

Military service
- Allegiance: Netherlands
- Branch/service: Royal Netherlands Navy
- Years of service: 1978–2015
- Rank: Vice admiral
- Battles/wars: Cold War; War in Afghanistan (2001–present)

Vice admiral Matthieu Borsboom (born 1959) is a retired Royal Netherlands Navy officer who served as the 3rd Commander of the Royal Netherlands Navy and Admiral Benelux, and has served with the International Security Assistance Force in Afghanistan.

== Naval career ==
Borsboom was commissioned into the Royal Netherlands Navy as a midshipman in 1978 and was commissioned in 1981. His first assignment was to HNLMS Tromp, followed by a posting to minesweeper HNLMS Naaldwijk and service as executive officer of HNLMS Veere, another minesweeper. He studied at the University of Groningen in Groningen before being sent to patrol vessel HNLMS Hadda as executive officer in 1983. He qualified as a Principal Warfare Officer in 1986, having studied at the Operational School in Den Helder, before being assigned to the frigate HNLMS Witte de With and then HNLMS De Ruyter. He went on to qualify as an anti-submarine warfare officer and was posted to HNLMS Piet Hein as head of the operations department at the height of the Cold War.

As a lieutenant commander in 1991, Borsboom transferred to the Centre for Automation of Weapon and Command Systems before returning to sea duty aboard HNLMS Willem van der Zaan, which was involved in supporting United Nations operations in the Caribbean, later serving aboard HNLMS Philips van Almonde. He attended the Defence Staff College in 1996 and was promoted to the rank of commander and took charge of the bureau for underwater sensors at the Ministry of Defence in The Hague, the city of his birth, for two years.

Borsboom commanded HNLMS Tjerk Hiddes in late 1998, after which he commanded HNLMS Van Speijk between 1999 and 2001. After commanding ships, he took up a staff position in The Hague before subsequently being promoted to captain in 2002 and another staff assignment. He then attended the Advanced Defence Course in 2004 and served in another staff post before promotion to commodore in 2005.

== High command ==
Borsboom was promoted to rear admiral in 2007 and was appointed Director of Operational Policy, Requirements and Plans. In November 2008, Borsboom was deployed to Afghanistan to become Deputy Chief of Staff for Stability in Kabul as part of the International Security Assistance Force. He reported directly to the commander of ISAF, then General Stanley A. McChrystal, and had responsibility for supporting elections in the country. He was succeeded by German Army Major General Richard Rossmanith and returned to the Netherlands in November 2009 and was subsequently promoted to vice admiral on 4 January 2010, assuming the appointment of Commander, Royal Netherlands Navy on 22 January 2010. He was succeeded as Commander of the Royal Netherlands Navy by Lieutenant General of the Marines Rob Verkerk on 26 September 2014.

== Personal life ==
Borsboom was born in The Hague in 1959. He is married to Ernie Borsboom-Miga and lives in Den Helder. The couple have three children, all of whom joined the Royal Netherlands Navy.

== Military decorations ==
- Officer of the Order of Orange-Nassau
- Commemorative Medal for Peace Operations
- Officers' Cross
- Inauguration Medal 1980
- Inauguration Medal 2013
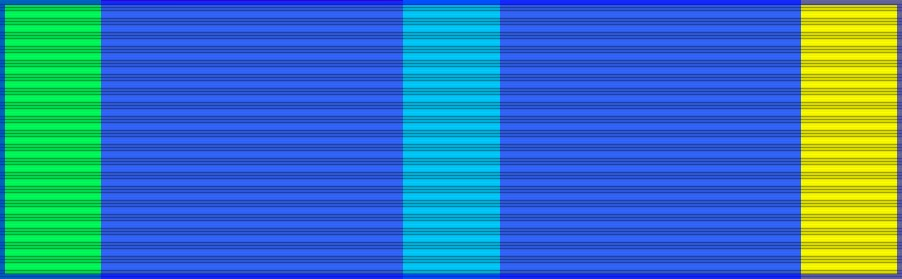
- Royal Dutch Navy Medal
- Cross for demonstrated marching skills
- Cross for the Two Day Military Performance Course
- NATO Medal
- Grand Officer of the Order of Naval Merit (Brazil)
- Commander in the National Order of Merit (France)
