= René Tas =

Retired Dutch admiral

Vice Admiral René Tas
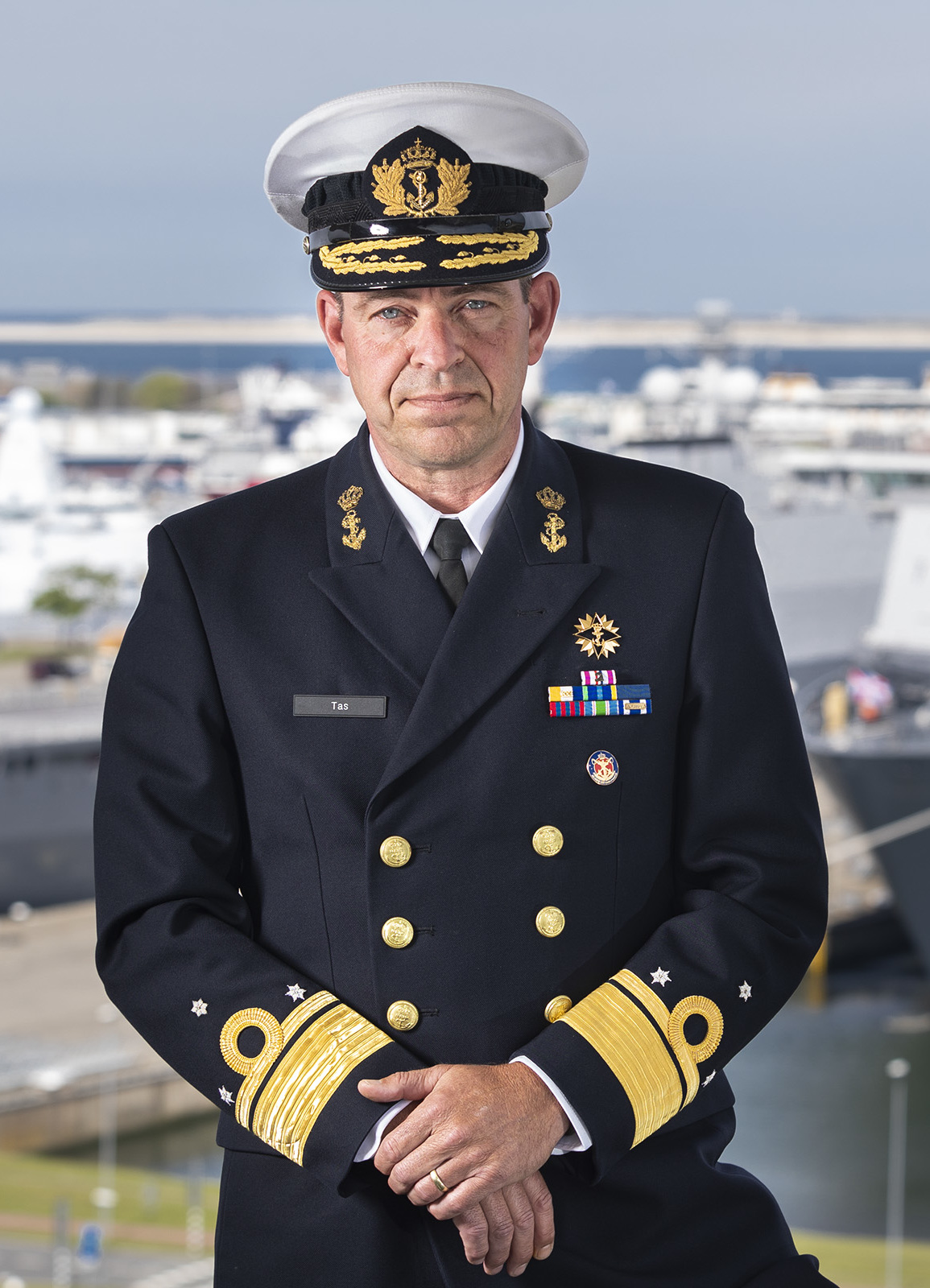

Commander of the Royal Netherlands Navy
- In office 9 September 2021 – 18 September 2025
- Preceded by: Vice Admiral Rob Kramer
- Succeeded by: Vice Admiral Harold Liebregs

Personal details
- Born: 1964 (age 61–62) Aardenburg

Military service
- Allegiance: Netherlands
- Branch/service: Royal Netherlands Navy
- Years of service: 1982-2025
- Rank: Vice Admiral, Admiral Benelux
- Commands: Royal Netherlands Navy

René Tas is a retired flag officer and vice admiral of the Royal Netherlands Navy, and served as the Commander of the Royal Netherlands Navy from 2021 to 2025. Tas additionally served as the Admiral Benelux, the commanding officer of the combined military staff of the Royal Netherlands Navy and the Naval Component of the Belgian Armed Forces. Tas replaced Vice Admiral Rob Kramer on 9 September 2021, and retired on 18 September 2025. He was replaced by Vice Admiral Harold Liebregs.
