= Zuiderwijk =

Zuiderwijk is a Dutch surname. Notable people with the surname include:

- Annie Zuiderwijk (1943–2020), Dutch herpetologist
- Cesar Zuiderwijk (born 1948), Dutch drummer
- Rob Zuiderwijk (born 1951), Dutch naval officer
