= Commander of the Royal Netherlands Navy =

Chief of the Royal Netherlands Navy

- Commandant Zeestrijdkrachten
- Rank flag for vice admiral

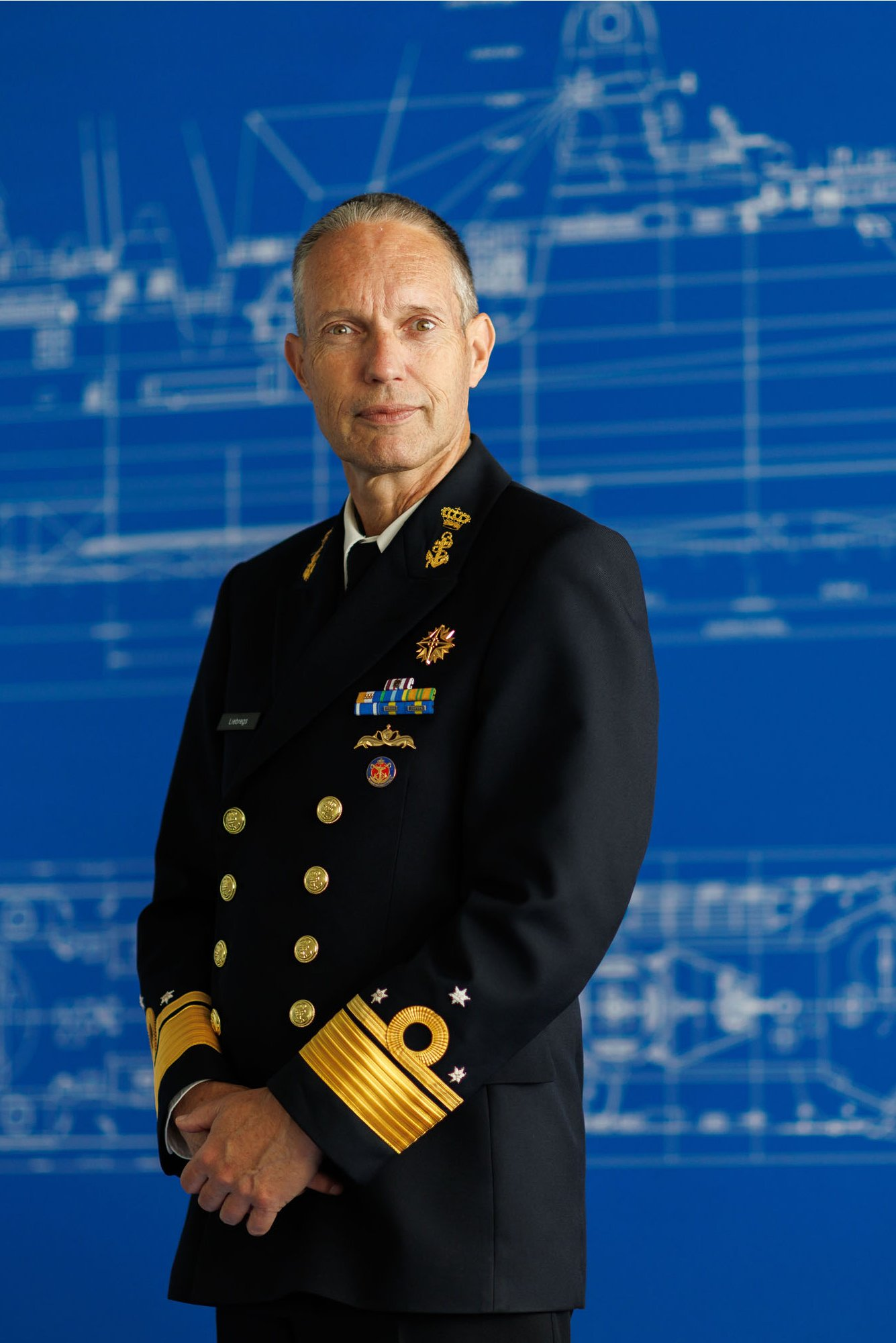
- Incumbent; Vice Admiral Harold Liebregs since 18 September 2025
- Royal Netherlands Navy
- Type: Service chief
- Abbreviation: CZsk
- Member of: Admiral Benelux
- Reports to: Chief of Defence
- Seat: The Hague
- Precursor: Commander of the Naval Forces
- Formation: 5 September 2005
- First holder: Jan-Willem Kelder

The Commander of the Royal Netherlands Navy (Dutch: Commandant Zeestrijdkrachten) (CZsk) is the highest-ranking officer of the Royal Netherlands Navy. The CZsk reports directly to the Chief of Defence (Netherlands).

The position of CZsk was created on 5 September 2005, following a large overhaul of the command structure of the Dutch armed forces. In this overhaul the position of Bevelhebber der Zeestrijdkrachten was dropped and the position of Commander of the Naval Force in The Netherlands was upgraded to the current CZsk position. Ever since the integration of the Royal Netherlands Marine Corps into the Navy, the former Commander of the Marine Corps has held the position of Deputy Commander of the Royal Netherlands Navy.

In addition to being the commanding officer of the Dutch Navy, under the terms of the BENESAM Treaty the CZsk is also the Admiral of the Benelux (the commanding officer of the integrated command of the Dutch and Belgian fleets). This means the CZsk is the commanding officer of the operational units of the Royal Netherlands Navy and the Belgian Naval Component. Also, the CZsk shares command responsibility with the Chief of Defence for units that have been deployed on international missions (under the colors of the United Nations).

The position of CZsk is statutorily held by a Vice Admiral or Lieutenant General of the Marines (NATO OF-8). The current CZsk is Vice-Admiral Harold Liebregs, who succeeded Vice Admiral René Tas in the position in September 2025.

== Units ==
The Commander of the Royal Dutch Navy is Director of four Directorates:

- Directorate Planning & Control
- Directorate Operational Support
- Directorate of Operations
- Directorate of the Caribbean

== List of officeholders ==
=== Commander of the naval forces ===
- 1939 - 1945 Lieutenant Admiral J. Th. Fürstner
- 1945 - 1948 Lieutenant Admiral C.E.L. Helfrich
- 1948 - 1951 Vice Admiral E.J. van Holthe
- 1951 - 1956 Vice Admiral A. de Booy
- 1956 - 1956 Vice Admiral F.T. Burghard
- 1956 - 1959 Vice Admiral H.H.L. Pröpper
- 1959 - 1963 Vice Admiral L. Brouwer
- 1963 - 1967 Vice Admiral A.H.J. van der Schatte Olivier
- 1967 - 1968 Vice Admiral H.M. van den Wall Bake
- 1968 - 1972 Vice Admiral J.B.M.J. Maas
- 1972 - 1975 Vice Admiral E. Roest
- 1976 - 1979 Vice Admiral B. Veldkamp
- 1979 - 1982 Vice Admiral H.L. van Beek
- 1982 - 1985 Vice Admiral J.H.B. Hulshof
- 1985 - 1989 Vice Admiral C.H.E. Brainich von Brainich Felth
- 1989 - 1992 Vice Admiral jhr. H. van Foreest
- 1992 - 1995 Vice Admiral N.W.G. Buis
- 1995 - 1998 Vice Admiral L. Kroon
- 1998 - 2003 Vice Admiral C. van Duyvendijk
- 2003 - 2005 Vice Admiral R.A.A. Klaver

=== Commander of the Royal Netherlands Navy ===
No.	Portrait	Name (Birth–Death)	Term of office			Ref.
No.	Portrait	Name (Birth–Death)	Took office	Left office	Time in office	Ref.
1		Vice Admiral; Jan-Willem Kelder (1949–2021)	5 September 2005	31 August 2007	1 year, 360 days	
2		Lieutenant General; Rob Zuiderwijk (born 1951)	31 August 2007	22 January 2010	2 years, 144 days	
3		Vice Admiral; Matthieu Borsboom (born 1959)	22 January 2010	26 September 2014	4 years, 247 days	
4		Lieutenant General; Rob Verkerk (born 1960)	26 September 2014	22 September 2017	2 years, 361 days	
5		Vice Admiral; Rob Kramer (born 1962)	22 September 2017	9 September 2021	3 years, 352 days	
6		Vice Admiral; René Tas (born 1964)	9 September 2021	18 September 2025	4 years, 9 days	
7		Vice Admiral; Harold Liebregs (born 1968)	18 September 2025	Incumbent	354 days	

== Deputy commander of the Royal Netherlands Navy ==
- Major General of the Marines Rob Zuiderwijk (5 September 2005 – 27 August 2007)
- Rear Admiral Wim Nagtegaal (27 August 2007 – 13 January 2010)
- Major General of the Marines Ton van Ede (13 January 2010 – 9 April 2012)
- Major General of the Marines Rob Verkerk (9 April 2012 – 26 September 2014)
- Rear Admiral Ben Bekkering (26 September 2014 – 27 May 2016)
- Rear Admiral Rob Kramer (27 May 2016-11 September 2017)
- Major General of the marines Frank van Sprang (11 September 2017-11 November 2019)
- Rear Admiral Jan-Hubert Hulsker (11 November 2019-December 2022)
- Rear Admiral Harold Liebregs (December 2022-18 September 2025)
- Major General of the marines Rob de Wit (18 September 2025-present)

== See also ==
- Commander of the Royal Netherlands Army
- Commander of the Royal Netherlands Air and Space Force
