= Harold Liebregs =

Dutch naval officer (born 1968)

Vice Admiral Harold Liebregs
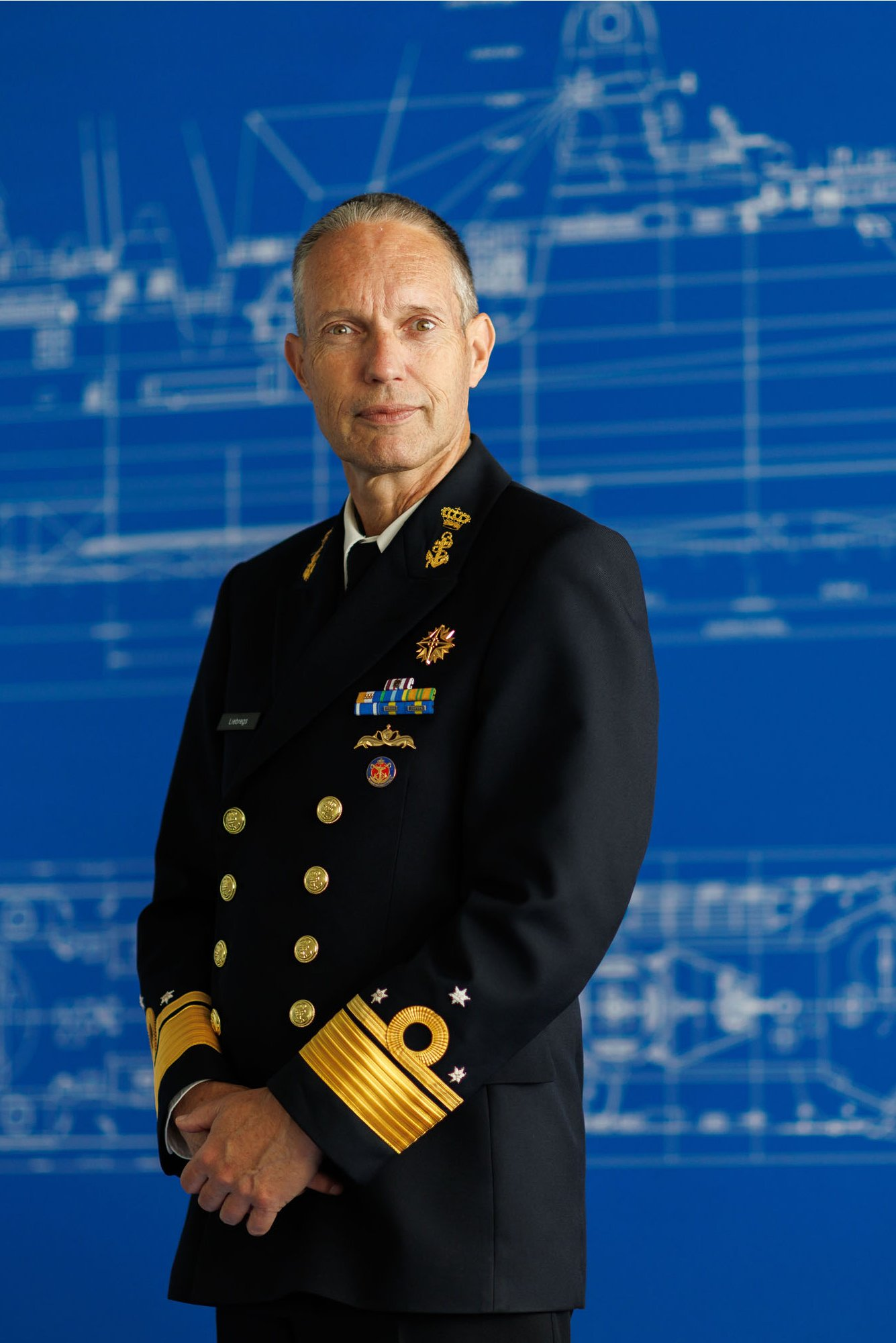

Commander of the Royal Netherlands Navy
- Incumbent
- Assumed office 18 September 2025
- Preceded by: Vice Admiral René Tas

Personal details
- Born: 1968 (age 57–58) Velsen

Military service
- Allegiance: Netherlands
- Branch/service: Royal Netherlands Navy
- Years of service: 1987-Present
- Rank: Vice Admiral, Admiral Benelux
- Commands: Royal Netherlands Navy

Vice Admiral Harold Liebregs, is a flag officer of the Royal Netherlands Navy and currently serves as the Commander of the Royal Netherlands Navy. Liebregs additionally serves as the Admiral Benelux, the commanding officer of the combined military staff of the Royal Netherlands Navy and the Naval Component of the Belgian Armed Forces, after replacing Vice Admiral René Tas on 18 September 2025.

== Career and education ==
In 1987, Liebregs joined the Royal Netherlands Navy as a midshipman. After being commissioned as officer 1990, he served in various operational positions on submarines and was involved in operations in the Adriatic Sea. In 2001 he completed the Submarine Command Course, after which he became the commanding officer (CO) of HNLMS Walrus for three years. During this command he conducted several operations around the Arab Peninsula.

From 2006 to 2007, he was CO of the submarine HNLMS Zeeleeuw. During this period the ship was involved in various exercises and trainings. Between 2004 and 2011, Liebregs held a number of positions with the Defence Staff, both in the field of operational requirements and planning., including material exploitation and plans related to ICT. He passed the Advanced Command & Staff Course in 2008.

From 2011, Liebregs served as Executive Officer on board the air defence frigate HNLMS Tromp. With this ship, he conducted counter-narcotics operations in the Caribbean. In December 2012, he took command of HNLMS De Ruyter. During counter-piracy operations near Somalia, nine pirates were arrested and delivered to the Seychelles for prosecution. During 2014 and 2015, he served as a senior policy advisor to the Policy Directorate, responsible for parliamentary support on budget and operational readiness.

On October 12, 2015, Liebregs was appointed CO of HNLMS Rotterdam and was promoted to Captain. In addition to various of amphibious exercises, he conducted operations to train members of the Libyan Coast Guard and counter-piracy operations off Somalia.

From 2018 to 2020, Liebregs worked at the Defense Staff as head of the maritime plans department, overseeing maritime operational requirements. In November 2020, Liebregs was promoted to Commodore and appointed Director of Materiel, Real Estate and Sustainability at the Directorate-General of Policy. In November 2022 he was promoted to Rear Admiral and appointed Deputy Commander Royal Netherlands Navy. In this position, his main focus is to develop the Royal Netherlands Navy to achieve a higher level of combat readiness. Since 18 September 2025, he commands the Royal Netherlands Navy and Admiral Benelux in the rank of Vice Admiral.
