= Allied Command Channel =

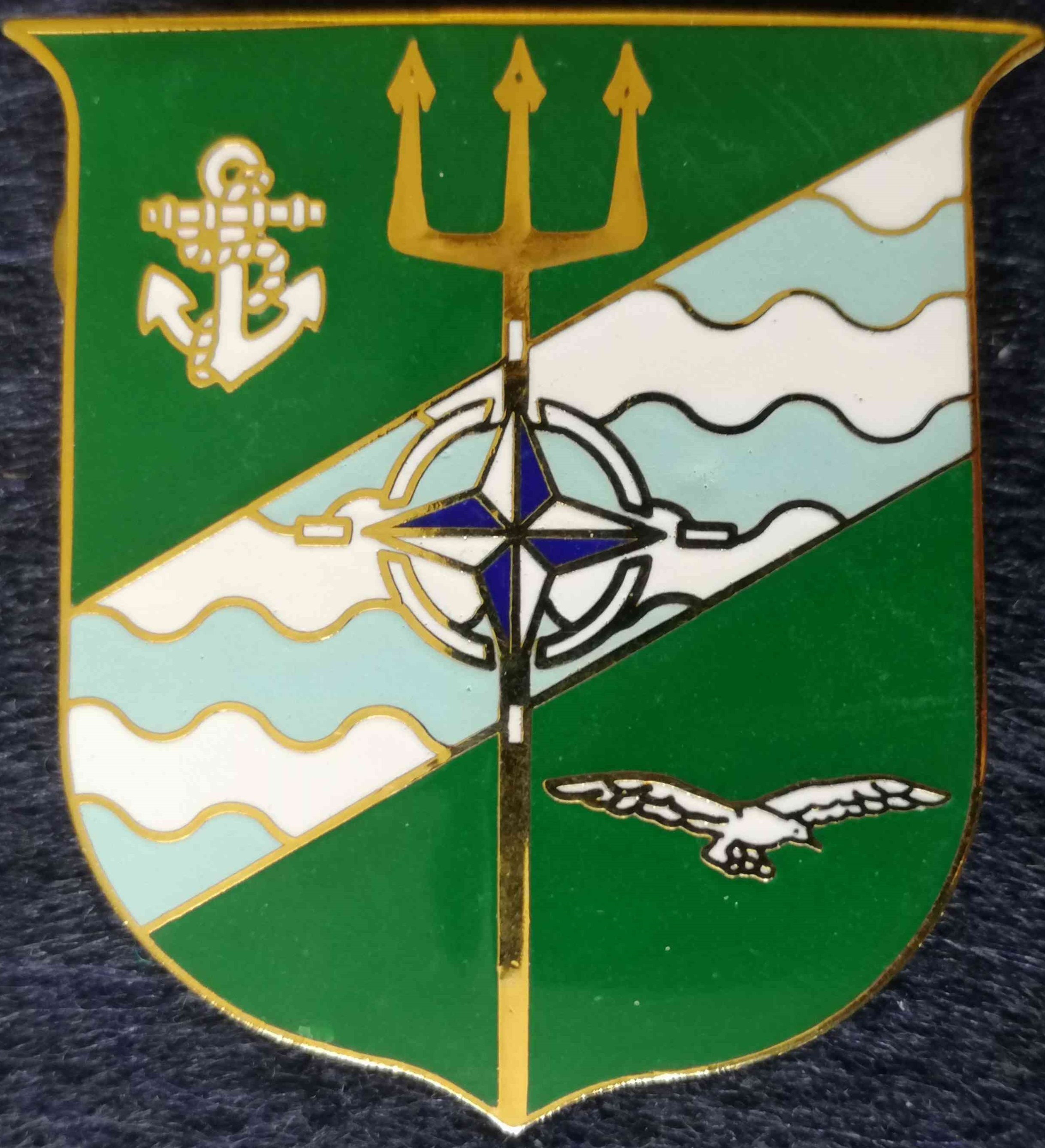
NATO ACCHAN / CINCHAN badge

Allied Command Channel (ACCHAN) was one of three major North Atlantic Treaty Organization (NATO) commands from 1952 to 1994. Commander-in-Chief Channel was a Major NATO Commander (MNC).

The Command was established in 1952 to defend the sea areas and allied shipping around the English Channel. In case of war with the Warsaw Pact, United States reinforcements, crucial to defeat a Soviet advance towards the Rhine, would have passed through the English Channel and disembarked mainly in the ports of Antwerp and Rotterdam. Therefore, ACCHAN's area of operations included most of the Southern part of the North Sea and all of the Channel up to the Celtic Sea.

== Structure ==
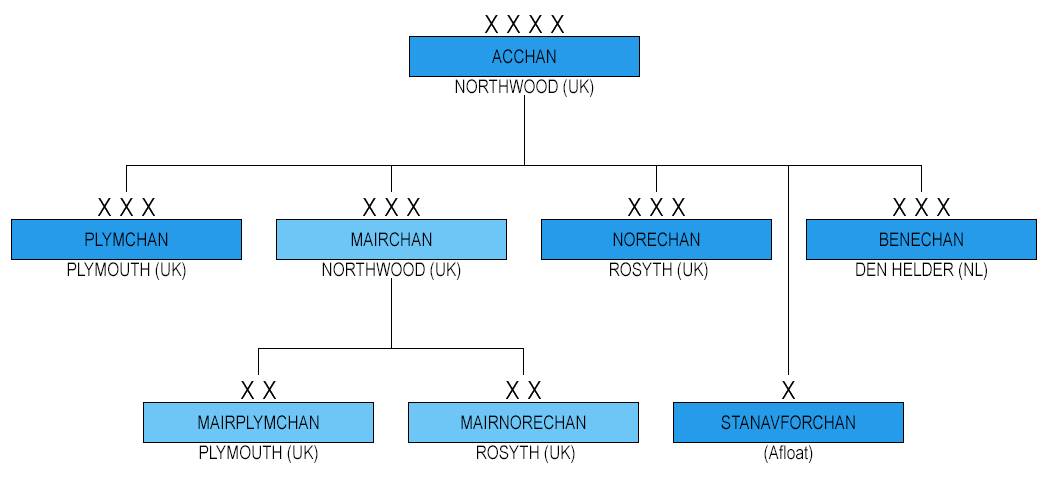
Structure of Allied Command Channel in 1989

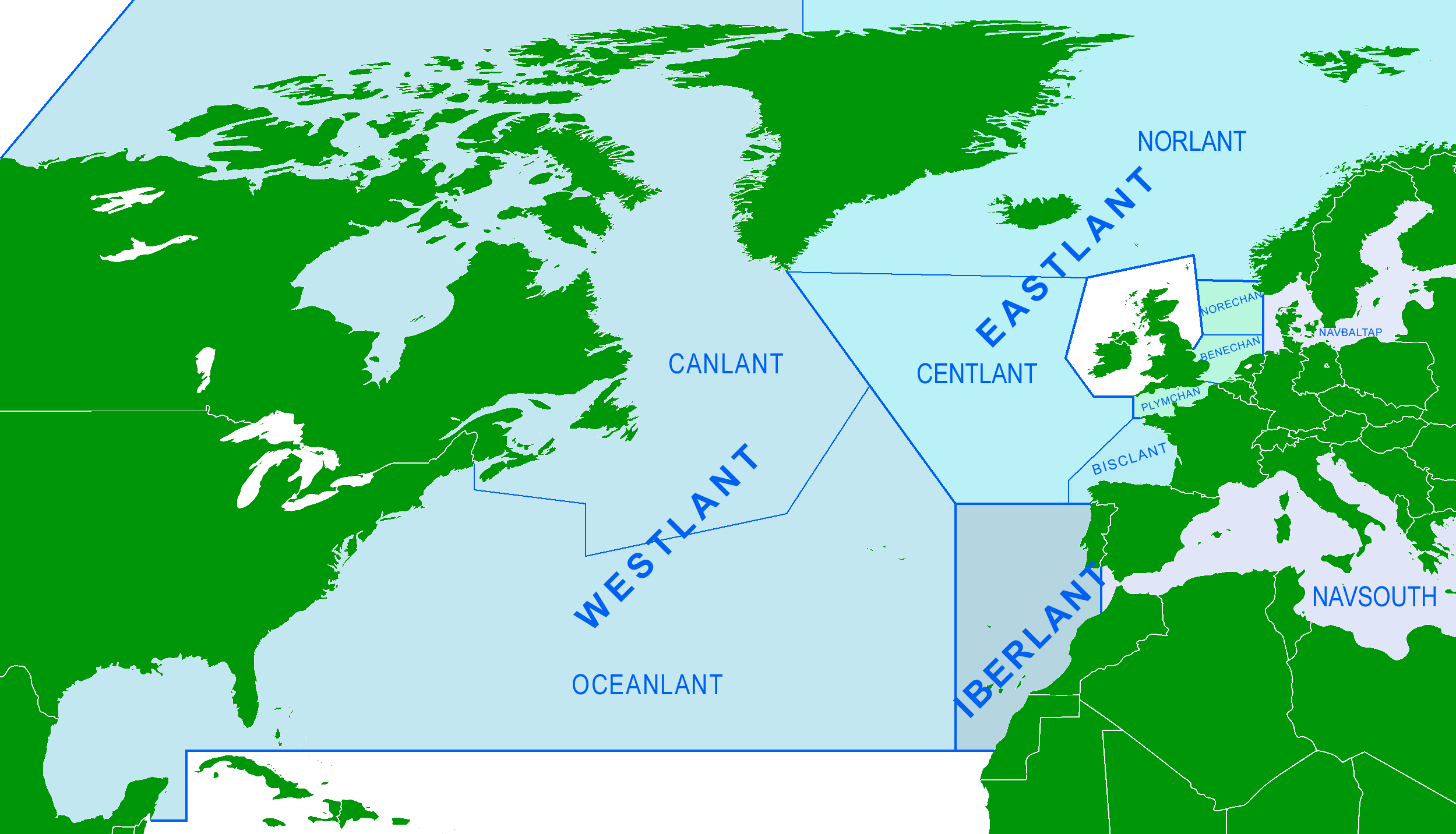
Subareas of NATO's Supreme Allied Commander Atlantic and Allied Command Channel, as well as the naval commands of Allied Forces Baltic Approaches and Allied Forces Southern Europe. (click to enlarge)

At the end of the Cold War ACCHAN had the following structure:

- Allied Command Channel (ACCHAN), in Northwood, United Kingdom
  - Nore Sub-Area Channel (NORECHAN), in Pitreavie, United Kingdom
  - Plymouth Sub-Area Channel (PLYMCHAN), in Plymouth, United Kingdom
  - Benelux Sub-Area Channel (BENECHAN), in Den Helder, Netherlands
  - Allied Maritime Air Force Channel (AIRCHAN), in Northwood, United Kingdom
    - Maritime Air Nore Sub-Area Channel (AIRNORECHAN), in Pitreavie, United Kingdom
    - Maritime Air Plymouth Sub-Area Channel (AIRPLYMCHAN), in Plymouth, United Kingdom
  - Standing Naval Force Channel (STANAVFORCHAN), afloat

=== Commander-in-Chief ===
The Commander-in-Chief, Allied Command Channel (CINCHAN) was a British admiral, who reported directly to the NATO Military Committee's Standing Group and was identified as a "Major NATO Commander" (like SACEUR and Supreme Allied Commander Atlantic (SACLANT). CINCHAN double hatted as follows:

- 1952-1966 Commander-in-Chief, Portsmouth
- 1966-1971 Commander-in-Chief British Western Fleet (who doubled as NATO Commander-in-Chief Eastern Atlantic (CINCEASTLANT))
- 1971-1994 Commander-in-Chief Fleet (CINCFLEET) (who doubled as NATO Commander-in-Chief Eastern Atlantic (CINCEASTLANT))

Allied Command Channel was based initially at Portsmouth, but in 1966 the command moved to Northwood, where the Western Fleet / Commander-in-Chief Eastern Atlantic was based.

In 1971 Commander-in-Chief Fleet became CINCCHAN. On 1 July 1994, the Channel Command was disestablished: however most of its subordinate commands remained in existence although reshuffled: most of the headquarters were absorbed within Allied Command Europe particularly as part of the new Allied Forces Northwestern Europe. A Channel Committee consisting of the naval Chiefs-of-Staff of Belgium, the Netherlands and the United Kingdom served as an advisory and consultative body to the Commander-in-Chief, Channel.

==== Nore Sub-Area Channel Command ====
The Nore Sub-Area Channel Command (NORECHAN) was a command based at HM Dockyard Chatham in Kent. NORECHAN's task was to prevent Soviet Navy ship and submarines passing through the Northern North Sea toward allied shipping routes in the English Channel. Originally the commander of NORECHAN was the Royal Navy Commander-in-Chief, The Nore. After the Royal Navy disestablished that post in 1961, the NORECHAN commander became Flag Officer Scotland & Northern Ireland at Pitreavie Castle in Rosyth in Scotland, who was already double-hatted as commander of Northern Sub-Area (NORLANT) of Allied Command Atlantic (ACLANT). Therefore, the following command structure resulted:

- 1952-1961 Commander-in-Chief, The Nore / Commander NORECHAN
- 1961-1994 Flag Officer Scotland & Northern Ireland / Commander NORECHAN / Commander NORLANT

==== Plymouth Sub-Area Channel Command ====
The Plymouth Sub-Area Channel Command (PLYMCHAN) was a command based at Admiralty House in Plymouth. As the Eastern approaches to the English Channel were defended by NORECHAN and BENECHAN, PLYMCHAN's task was to prevent Soviet Navy submarines from entering the Western side of the channel. Therefore, PLYMCHAN had a large number of anti-submarine warships at its disposal, which would operate where Channel and Atlantic Ocean intersect. PLYMCHAN would have operated alongside the French Navy, which was not integrated into NATO's command structures. In 1969 the positions of Commander-in-Chief, Plymouth and Commander-in-Chief, Portsmouth were merged as Commander-in-Chief, Naval Home Command (CINCNAVHOME) and command of PLYMCHAN passed to the Flag Officer Plymouth, who also double hatted as NATO Commander Central Sub-Area (CENTLANT). Therefore, the following command structure resulted:

- 1952-1969 Commander-in-Chief, Plymouth / Commander PLYMCHAN
- 1969-1994 Flag Officer Plymouth / Commander CENTLANT / Commander PLYMCHAN

==== Benelux Sub-Area Channel Command ====
In case of war the entire Belgian naval combat force would have come under NATO's Benelux Sub-Area Channel Command (BENECHAN), a joint Dutch-Belgian command in Den Helder under ACCHAN. BENECHAN was one of ACCHAN's three naval sub-commands. BENECHAN's area of operation comprised a large portion of the southern part of the North Sea and would command the entire Belgian Naval Force as well as the Home Fleet of the Royal Netherlands Navy.

While the commander of BENECHAN was always the commanding admiral of the larger and more powerful Netherlands naval forces-at-home, Belgium's Commander Naval Operations served as the BENECHAN's Chief of Staff. The combined Dutch and Belgian staff at Den Helder in the Netherlands was tasked with ensuring that the approach, coastal, and entrance channels to Belgian and Netherlands' ports were always open for allied shipping. As ACCHAN's other two sub-commands PLYMCHAN (Plymouth Sub-Area Channel Command) and NORECHAN (The Nore Sub-Area Channel Command) defended the direct approaches to the Belgian and Dutch coast via the English channel and the North Sea and as BALTAP's German-Danish Allied Naval Forces Baltic Approaches Command (COMNAVBALTAP) kept the Soviet Baltic Fleet bottled up in the Baltic Sea, the main risk for allied shipping in the BENECHAN area of operations were air and submarine dropped naval mines.

Therefore, the Belgian Naval Force fielded a large number of minesweepers and minehunters. As American reinforcements, crucial to defeat a Soviet advance towards the Rhine, would have disembarked mainly in the ports of Antwerp and Rotterdam, the Belgians fielded 10 inshore minesweeper to keep the Western Scheldt free of naval mines. To increase interoperability and to have a quickly deployable force ACCHAN included the Standing Naval Force Channel (STANAVFORCHAN), which consisted of seven to nine mine countermeasure vessels from the Royal Navy, German Navy, Royal Netherlands Navy and Belgian Naval Force.

After the end of the Cold War BENECHAN became the Dutch-Belgian bi-national command Admiral Benelux in Den Helder.

==== Allied Maritime Air Force Channel ====
Allied Maritime Air Force Command (MAIRCHAN) was based at Northwood Headquarters and its commander was the Royal Air Force Air Marshal commanding No. 18 (Maritime) Group. He was also the Commander Maritime Air Eastern Atlantic (MAIREASTLANT) under CinC, Eastern Atlantic (CINCEASTLANT), which was a command subordinate to Supreme Allied Commander Atlantic (SACLANT).

In case of war the following units would be under MAIRCHAN. Allied reinforcements flying from bases or operating in the area of MAIRCHAN would also have come under its control:

- No. 18 (Maritime) Group, Northwood Headquarters, doubled as NATO Commander Maritime Air Eastern Atlantic (COMAIREASTLANT) and Commander Allied Maritime Air Force Channel (COMAIRCHAN)
  - Maritime Air Region North, RAF Pitreavie Castle, Rosyth, doubled as Commander Maritime Air Northern Sub-Area (MAIRNORLANT) and Commander Maritime Air Nore Sub-Area Channel (AIRNORECHAN)
    - RAF Kinloss
      - No. 120 Squadron RAF, (Maritime patrol, 8x Nimrod MR.2)
      - No. 201 Squadron RAF, (Maritime patrol, 8x Nimrod MR.2)
      - No. 206 Squadron RAF, (Maritime patrol, 8x Nimrod MR.2)
    - RAF Lossiemouth
      - No. 8 Squadron RAF, (Airborne early warning and control, 12x Avro Shackleton AEW.2)
      - No. 12 Squadron RAF, (Maritime attack, 16x Buccaneer S.2B )^{note 1}
      - No. 208 Squadron RAF, (Maritime attack, 16x Buccaneer S.2B )^{note 1}
      - No. 226 Operational Conversion Unit RAF, (16x Jaguar GR.1A)^{note 1}
      - No. 237 Operational Conversion Unit RAF, (Maritime attack, 16x Buccaneer S.2B)
      - No. 48 Squadron RAF Regiment, (Air Defence, 8x Rapier launch stations)
  - Maritime Air Region South, Admiralty House, Plymouth, doubled as Commander Maritime Air Central Sub-Area (MAIRCENTLANT) and Commander Maritime Air Plymouth Sub-Area Channel (AIRPLYMCHAN)
    - RAF St Mawgan
      - No. 42 Squadron RAF, (Maritime patrol, 8x Nimrod MR.2)
      - No. 236 Operational Conversion Unit RAF, (3x Nimrod MR.2)
    - Netherlands Naval Aviation Service, Valkenburg Naval Air Base, Netherlands
      - No. 320 Squadron MLD with 6x P-3 Orion maritime patrol aircraft
      - No. 321 Squadron MLD with 6x P-3 Orion maritime patrol aircraft
      - Training Flight with 1x P-3 Orion maritime patrol aircraft

Note 1: Unit had a nuclear strike role and had twelve WE.177 tactical nuclear weapons.

==== Standing Naval Force Channel ====
Standing Naval Force Channel (STANAVFORCHAN), activated on May 11, 1973 as an active mine countermeasure squadron directly under the command of CINCHAN. The squadron was tasked with the protection of the English Channel and the Southern North Sea. STANAVFORCHAN consisted of seven to nine mine countermeasure vessels from the Royal Navy, German Navy, Royal Netherlands Navy and Belgian Naval Force, which were assigned to the squadron for either six or twelve months. The command of the squadron rotated between the participating countries, with the exception of Germany. As the squadron had no homeport it spent most time afloat or on port visits in allied nations.

STANAVFORCHAN continuously trained mine clearance and allied cooperation to ensure that in case of war the four allied nations would be able to defuse Soviet mines dropped by airplane or submarine in their area of operations rapidly. In 2000-01 STANAVFORCHAN changed name and composition when the Royal Danish Navy and Royal Norwegian Navy joined the squadron.

From 3 September 2001 it was known as the Mine Countermeasures Force North Western Europe (MCMFORNORTH) and from 1 January 2005 it became Standing NATO Mine Countermeasures Group 1.
