= Wim Robberecht =

Belgian naval officer (born 1962)

- Born: 1962 (age 63–64); Kortrijk, Belgium
- Military career
- Allegiance: Belgium
- Branch: Belgian Navy
- Service years: 1980–present
- Rank: Divisional admiral

Wim Robberecht (born 1962, Kortrijk) is a Belgian naval officer who holds the rank of divisional admiral and since 2016 has served as the commander of the Belgian Navy (Marine Component).

== Biography ==
Robberecht was born in 1962 in the city of Kortrijk, joining the Royal Military Academy in 1980. During his time there, he was awarded the Sword of His Majesty the King, a decoration for outstanding students. He finished in 1985 and served on minesweeping/hunting vessels before assuming command of the M484 Dinant. He then attended the Dutch-Belgian joint Operational School in Den Helder from 1988 to 1990, when he was appointed flag lieutenant to the chief of naval staff. Robberecht then served as the head of the operational section aboard the frigate Wandelaar, taking part in the NATO blockade of Yugoslavia. In 1996 he commanded the minehunter Aster and later the Narcis. Following a course at a NATO school in Oberammergau, Germany, he held various staff positions in the Belgian armed forces. Robberecht completed the Maritime Warfare Course in the United Kingdom and then went on to command the frigates Westdiep and Wielingen, before attending the Royal Defense College in Brussels in 2002. After his graduation from there, he served on the human resources department of the Joint Staff and as director of naval education, becoming chief of staff to the Chief of Defence in 2005.

He served as the first commander of the frigate Leopold I, which Belgium acquired from the Royal Netherlands Navy in 2007, and commanded it during a UN mission near Lebanon. In 2010 he completed additional studies at the Royal Defense College and the Management Training Center in Paris of the French Ministry of Defense. Robberecht was appointed Director Maritime Operations within the Marine Component in 2011 and also served on the operations staff of Admiral Benelux (the commanding officer of the integrated Dutch and Belgian naval commands).

In September 2016, Divisional Admiral Robberecht was appointed as the Commander of the Marine Component, succeeding Georges Heeren.

== Personal life ==
Robberecht is married and has three children.

== Awards ==
Robberecht is the recipient of the following awards:

Officer of the Order of Leopold
Commander of the Order of the Crown
Military Cross, First Class
Commemorative Medal for Foreign Operations or Missions
Sword of His Majesty the King

== Sources ==
Military offices
Preceded by Georges Heeren	Commander of the Marine Component; 2016–present	Succeeded by incumbent
Preceded by Georges Heeren	Deputy Admiral Benelux; 2016–present	Succeeded by incumbent
