= Little Feller (nuclear tests) =

1962 pair of nuclear tests conducted at the Nevada Test Site, United States

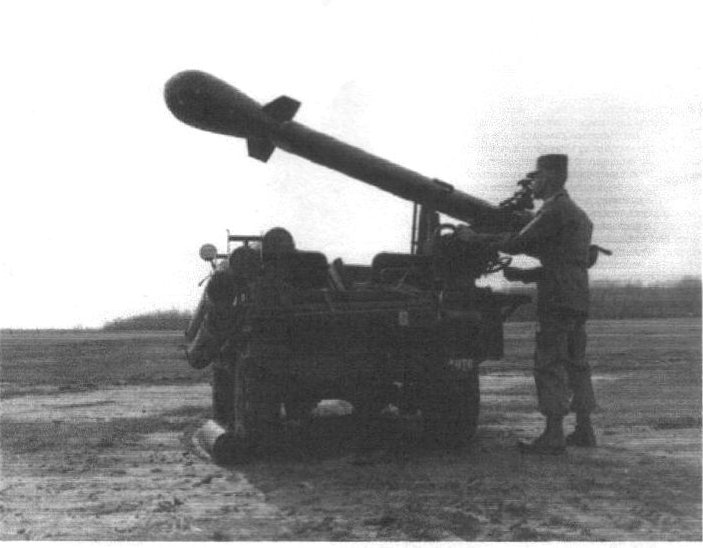
Little Feller I. The Davy Crockett weapons system is mounted on a vehicle and prepared for launch.

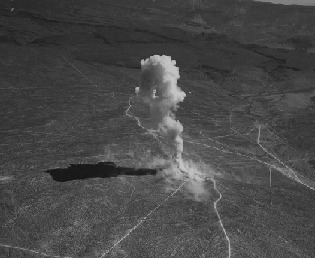
Little Feller I explosion

Little Feller II and Little Feller I were code names for a set of nuclear tests undertaken by the United States at the Nevada Test Site on July 7 and 17, 1962 as part of Operation Sunbeam. They were both tests of stockpiled W54 warheads, the smallest nuclear warheads known to have been produced by the United States, used in both the Davy Crockett warhead and the Special Atomic Demolition Munition.

In Little Feller II (July 7), the warhead was suspended only three feet above the ground and had a yield equivalent to 22 tons of TNT (92 GJ). In Little Feller I (July 17), the warhead was launched as a Davy Crockett device from a stationary 155 millimeter launcher and set to detonate between 20–40 feet (6.1–12.2 m) above the ground around 1.7 miles (2.7 km) from the launch point, with a yield of 18 tons of TNT (75 GJ). This test was performed in conjunction with Operation Ivy Flats, a simulated military environment, and was observed by Attorney General Robert F. Kennedy and presidential adviser General Maxwell D. Taylor.

Little Feller I was the last near-ground atmospheric nuclear detonation conducted by the United States (the high altitude Fishbowl tests concluded in November 1962 with a detonation at around 69,000 feet (21 km) altitude).

All further tests were conducted underground, in accordance with the Partial Test Ban Treaty. An additional footnote is Operation Roller Coaster. Although this later series of tests involved no true nuclear detonation, they did disperse radioactive material using conventional explosives and thus may alternatively be considered the last aboveground nuclear test.
