= Nuclear-Armed Sea-Launched Cruise Missile =

United States Navy nuclear weapon

Nuclear-Armed Sea-Launched Cruise Missile (SLCM-N)
- Type: SLCM/SLCM-N

Service history
- Used by: United States Navy

Production history
- Designed: In development since 2018
- Manufacturer: Leidos, Raytheon, Lockheed Martin, Northrop Grumman, Florida Turbine Technologies
- Produced: Initial operating capability targeted for 2034

Specifications
- Warhead: W80 Mod 5 thermonuclear weapon
- Engine: Solid propellant first stage, turbofan second stage (speculated)
- Operational range: 2,000 to 2,500 km (speculated)
- Launch platform: Virginia-class submarine Trump-class battleship

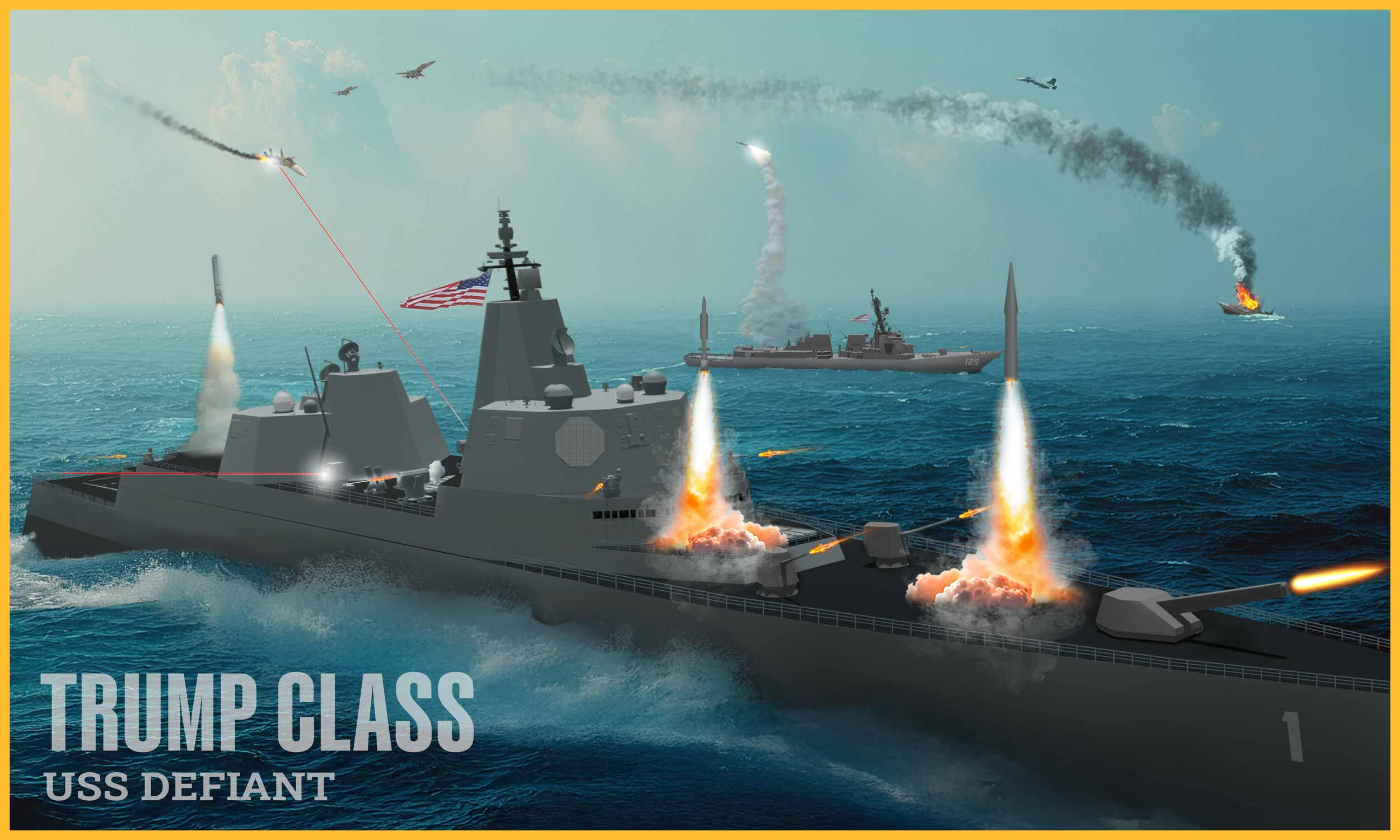
The Trump-class battleship proposal, one of the proposed launch platforms for the SLCM-N.

The Nuclear-Armed Sea-Launched Cruise Missile (SLCM-N) is a tactical nuclear weapon under development for the United States Navy since 2018. Proposed by the first Trump administration in the 2018 Nuclear Posture Review, it has been described as the first new US nuclear weapon since the end of the Cold War.

Considered for both attack submarines and surface combatants, the US Navy was specifically studying the missile for Virginia-class submarines. Supporters argue the missile would increase nuclear deterrence and assurance to allies, while critics argue it would lower the threshold and increase the risk of misunderstandings leading to nuclear war with Russia or China, and exacerbate a second nuclear arms race.

== History ==
In 2022 the Biden administration requested funding for the National Nuclear Security Administration to study adapting the W80-4 for the SLCM-N. The W80-4 is intended for the AGM-181 LRSO nuclear cruise missile, to be launched by B-52 Stratofortress and B-21 Raider strategic bombers. In January 2026, Sandia National Laboratories announced the SLCM-N would use the new W80-5 variant.

The SLCM-N was one of the nuclear weapons projects advocated for by the conservative political program Project 2025. In December 2025, the second Trump Administration announced the Trump-class battleship and "Golden Fleet" project, for which the renamed "Surface Launch Cruise Missile-Nuclear" was listed as an armament.

The United States previously operated the Tomahawk Land Attack Missile – Nuclear (TLAM-N) between the mid-1980s and 1992, a Tomahawk missile variant armed with a W80 warhead, deployed on surface ships and submarines. Withdrawn from all ships in 1992, the Navy retained the ability to deploy them on Los Angeles and Virginia-class submarines prior to their retirement in 2013, following the 2010 Nuclear Posture Review judging them as "redundant". The Biden administration in the 2022 Nuclear Posture Review recommended against funding the SLCM-N, as it provided marginal benefit considering the W76-2 low-yield (~six kilotons of TNT) warhead being deployed with UGM-133 Trident II submarine-launched ballistic missiles.

== Criticism ==
A 2023 Bulletin of the Atomic Scientists analysis by Robert J. Goldston strongly criticized the project, arguing it would destabilize the nuclear status quo with Russia or China. By appearing the same as conventional sea-launched cruise missiles, with an unclear nuclear payload, yield, or target, and threatening nuclear decapitation strikes, it would escalate the risk of misunderstandings causing nuclear war. Goldston argued the US should preserve its ability to use sea-launched cruise missile barrages without risking escalation, as it has throughout the Yugoslav Wars and Middle East conflicts, and may need to use in a NATO defense of Poland and the Baltics against Russia. Goldston suggested up to 608 warheads may be installed on 38 Virginia-class submarines alone, risking both Russia and China matching with similar numbers, causing the US to face ~1,200 new warheads in its adversaries' arsenals.

== See also ==
- P-270 Moskit - Soviet/Russian naval nuclear cruise missile
- RK-55 - Soviet/Russian naval nuclear cruise missile
- SSM-N-8 Regulus - First US and worldwide nuclear cruise missile
- Nuclear weapons of the United States
- Russia and weapons of mass destruction
- Nuclear weapons of China
