= Eguermin =

EGUERMIN
- Ostend; Belgium

Information
- Motto: Non ostento, sed ostendo (I do not show off, but I merely show)
- Established: 1960
- Director: KLTZ Nico Vasseur
- Website: www.eguermin.org

EGUERMIN is the Belgian-Netherlands Naval Mine Warfare school. This academic establishment provides training and education to Belgian and Netherlands Navy crewmembers in charge of minehunting, as well as to Naval Mine Warfare officers from NATO and PfP countries.

== History ==
The Naval Barracks of Ostend were established during Dutch rule (1815–1830). In June 1956, the first stone of the Naval Mine Warfare School was laid during a ceremony in the presence of His Royal Highness Prince Albert of Belgium within the military zone of Ostend.

The School was officially inaugurated in June 1960.

Since 1965, the School has offered courses on mine warfare for the Belgian and Netherlands Navies. In 1975 it was formally established as an integrated bi-national Belgian-Netherlands organization, and began offering courses for NATO partners.

In 2006, EGUERMIN was accredited by the North Atlantic Council as a NATO Naval Mine Warfare Centre of Excellence.

== Mission ==
The school's primary mission is to provide education and training to crewmembers of the Belgian Navy and the Royal Netherlands Navy. The school is also open to other NATO countries and international partners. The subjects taught cover technique, tactics, procedures and doctrine to counter naval mines.

Every year more than five hundred students attend classes.

== Education ==
=== Bi-national education ===
EGUERMIN is in charge of both instruction and training of Belgian and Netherlands personnel. Bi-national courses are designed to form the future sonar operators, assistant minehunting officers, minehunting officers and commanding officers of the Belgian and Netherlands mine countermeasures vessels. Instruction is composed of a theoretical part and of a practical part executed in a simulator reproducing the operational room of a minehunter.

The crews are then trained at sea during an operational sea training for which EGUERMIN specifically trains the personnel on mine countermeasures (MCM) procedures and evaluate the capacity of the crew to prepare and execute properly an MCM operation.

=== International education ===
The school delivers education to officers from NATO and non-NATO countries. These are designed to form Staff Naval Mine Warfare officers or to give a general mine warfare awareness to the students.

== Gaming System ==
The school uses a Naval Mine Warfare Gaming System capable of simulating the interaction between the threat caused by naval mines and the mine countermeasures assets when executing a campaign in an imaginary scenario. This gaming system is designed to offer an advanced training on naval mine warfare to NATO forces.

The Naval Mine Warfare Gaming System (NMWGS) creates a confrontation between the Naval Minefield planner and the Naval Mine Counter Measures (NMCM) Commander, the objective of the NMWGS is to provide instruction and training for Naval Mine Warfare Staff Officers in the areas of NMCM planning, decision-making and evaluation. The instruction and training is primarily given on the NMCM Tasking Authority level, eventually complemented by a superior command level.

Each year, over 200 NMCM staff officers train and exercise on the NMWGS as part of:

- The annual NATO Computer Assisted Exercise DYNAMIC MOVE
- The EGUERMIN NATO Principal Warfare Officer NMW and Staff Officer NMW courses;
- A wargaming period during a national NMW course (e.g. UK, NOR, DEU);
- A dedicated NMCM Staff Team Training (e.g. UK MCM squadrons, NLMARFOR)

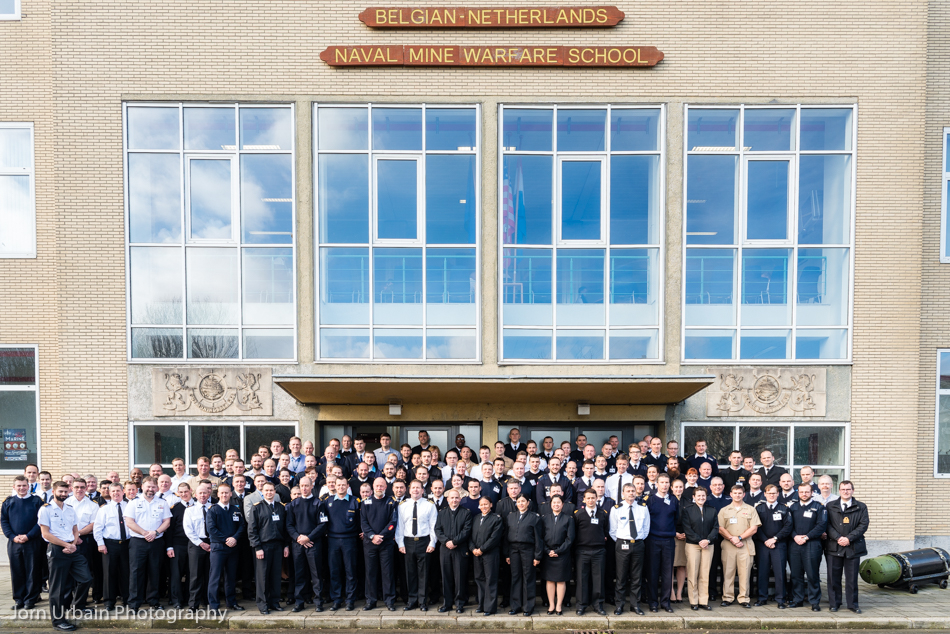
