= Davy Crockett (nuclear device) =

American nuclear recoilless gun

M28/M29 Davy Crockett
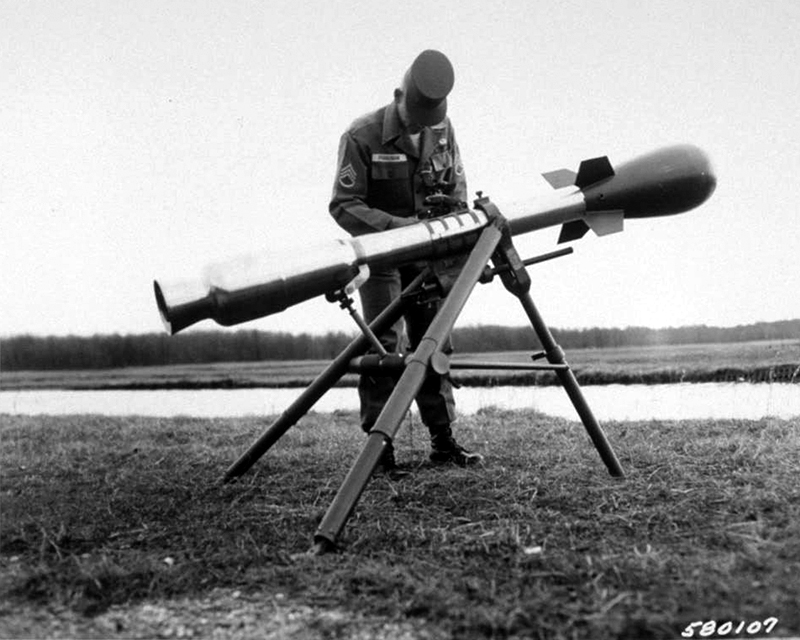
- A Davy Crockett at the Aberdeen Proving Ground, Maryland, 1961
- Type: Nuclear recoilless gun
- Place of origin: United States

Service history
- Used by: United States
- Wars: Cold War

Production history
- Designer: Ted Taylor
- Variants: M28; M29

Specifications
- Mass: M28 108.5 pounds (49.2 kg), unloaded; M29 316 pounds (143 kg), unloaded
- Crew: 5
- Elevation: 5-800 mils (0.3–45 degrees)
- Effective firing range: M28 1.25 miles (2.01 km); M29 2.5 miles (4.0 km)
- Blast yield: 20 tonnes of TNT (84 GJ)

The M28 or M29 Davy Crockett Weapon System was a tactical nuclear recoilless smoothbore gun for firing the M388 nuclear projectile, armed with the W54 nuclear warhead, that was deployed by the United States during the Cold War. It was the first project assigned to the United States Army Weapon Command in Rock Island, Illinois.

It remains one of the smallest nuclear weapon systems ever built, incorporating a warhead with yields of 10 to 20 tons of TNT (42 to 84 GJ). It is named after American folk hero, soldier, and congressman Davy Crockett.

== History ==
By 1950, there had been rapid developments made in the use of nuclear weapons after the detonation of "Little Boy" and "Fat Man" in 1945. These developments paved the way for nuclear warheads to be created at a smaller size.

Advances in nuclear weapons technology, spurred on by the first detonation of the Soviet nuclear bomb in 1949, led to great reductions in the size of nuclear weapons. In 1957, the United States Atomic Energy Commission (AEC) declared that it had created a small fission warhead that could be deployed for frontline use by infantrymen. AEC made Major General John H. Hinrichs the leader in turning the warhead into a weapon system under the Battle Group Atomic Delivery System (BGADS) program, which began at Picatinny Arsenal in New Jersey in January 1958.

In August 1958, the Army began to officially refer to the BGADS as the Davy Crockett, after the American folk hero who died at the Battle of the Alamo in 1836. After four years of testing at Forts Greeley and Wainwright in Alaska, and the Yuma Test Station in Arizona, the M28/M29 Davy Crockett entered service in May 1961.

Davy Crockett sections were assigned to United States Army Europe, which included the Seventh United States Army, and to Pacific Theater Eighth United States Army armor units and mechanized and non-mechanized infantry battalions. During alerts to the Inner German border in the Fulda Gap the Davy Crocketts accompanied their battalions. All Seventh Army's V Corps, including the 3rd Armored Division, combat maneuver battalions had preassigned positions in the Fulda Gap. These were known as GDP (General Defense Plan) positions. The Davy Crockett sections were included in these defensive deployment plans.

The Seventh Army's V Corps also had nuclear artillery rounds and atomic demolition munitions, for potential use in the Fulda Gap. On the Korean peninsula, Eighth Army units assigned the Davy Crockett weapons planned to use mountain passes that funneled armor as killing grounds, creating temporarily deadly radioactive zones roadblocked by destroyed tanks and other vehicles.

Production of the Davy Crockett began at Picatinny Arsenal following the August 15, 1958, approval of the design. There was approval for funding of 6,247 to be manufactured, but a total of 2,100 were actually made. 714 M101 depleted uranium finned spotter rounds were fired in training between 1962 and 1968 at the Pohakuloa Training Area on Hawaiʻi island. The weapon was deployed with US Army forces from 1961 to 1971.

The 55th and 56th Infantry Platoons, attached to the Division Artillery of the US 82nd Airborne Division, were the last units equipped with the M29 Davy Crockett weapons system. These two units were parachute deployed and, with a 1/2-short-ton (0.45 t) truck per section (three per platoon), were fully air droppable. The units were deactivated in mid-1968.

The Davy Crockett's nuclear warhead, the M388, was removed from US Army Europe (in West Germany) in August 1967. The last nuclear-equipped warhead was retired in 1971. Brigadier General Alvin Cowan, Assistant Division Commander of 3rd Armored Division, while stating the weapon was a "significant advance" in technical terms and that the laboratory responsible deserved "a great deal of credit", further stated that the Army retired the weapon due to the personnel costs associated with it as well as apparent "great fear that some sergeant would start a nuclear war".

Like all but the second and third nuclear weapons ever completed, the Davy Crockett was never used in combat. Many decommissioned Davy Crockett systems have been preserved in museums throughout the United States.

In 2005 the US Army announced that it uncovered 600 pounds (270 kg) of depleted uranium from the training sites used for the Davy Crockett's development. They said that 12,405 acres (5,020 ha) of land could likely be tainted by this.

== M388 nuclear round ==
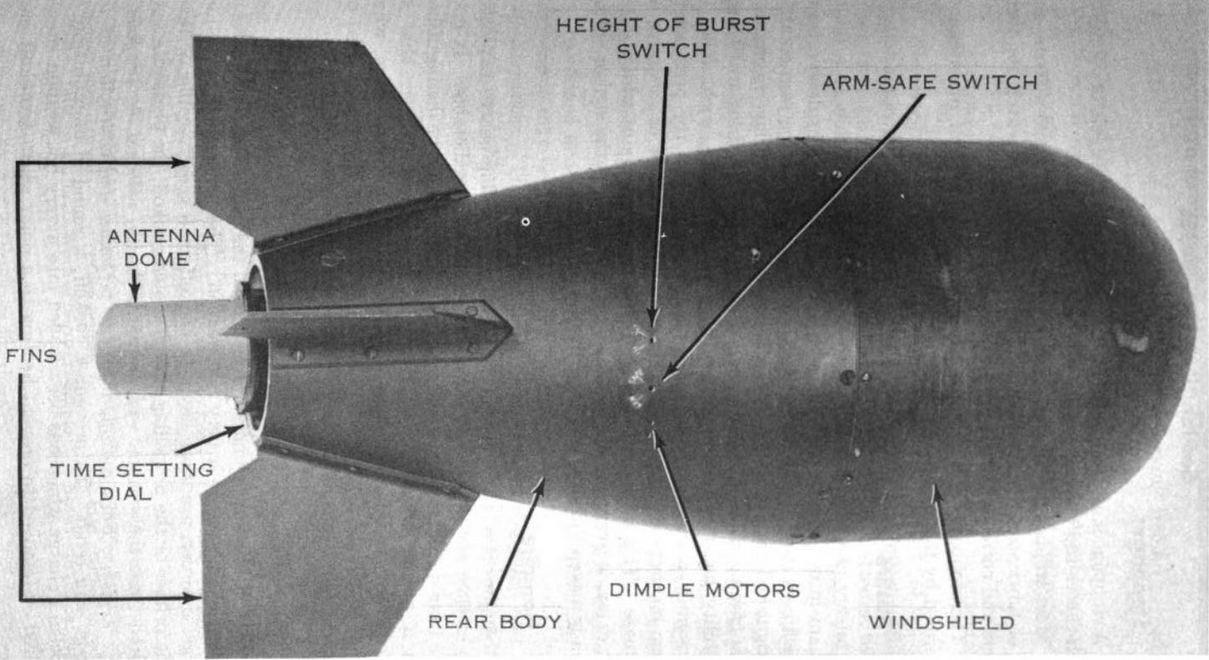
An annotated photograph of a training-dummy version of the M388 nuclear round.

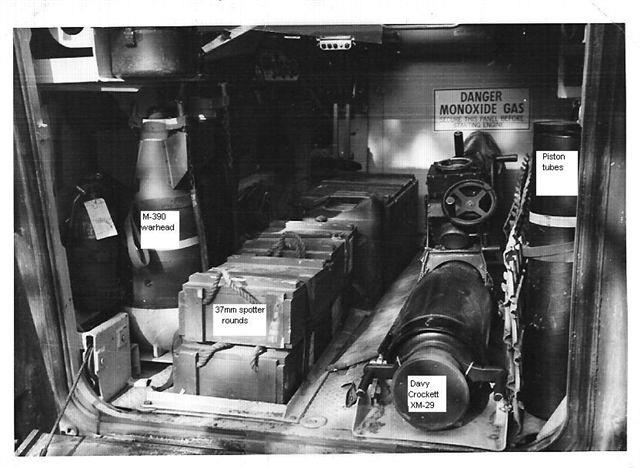
Stowage of the Davy Crockett weapon system in an M113 carrier

Projectile, Atomic, Supercaliber 279mm XM388 for the Davy Crockett contained a W54 Mod 2 nuclear warhead. It was a very compact pure fission device weighing 50.9 pounds (23.1 kg) and when packaged in the M388 round weighed 76 pounds (34 kg). The warhead had a yield equivalent to 20 tonnes of TNT (84 GJ) and contained 26 pounds (12 kg) of high explosives. There was also a 10 tonne, TNT equivalent, variant.

Controls on the projectile included a two-position height-of-burst switch that could be set to 2 feet (0.61 m) and 40 feet (12 m) airburst, a safety switch with 'safe' and 'arm' positions and a time setting dial that allowed a time delay between 1 and 50 seconds before the fuze armed. If the time delay was greater than the time-of-flight, the weapon would hit the ground before it armed and not detonate. The time dial also had a 'safe' setting, and so acted as a second safety switch.

The complete round was 31 inches (79 cm) long, with a diameter of 11 inches (28 cm) at its widest point; a subcaliber piston at the back of the shell was inserted into the launcher's barrel for firing. The M388 atomic projectile was mounted on the barrel-inserted spigot via bayonet slots. Once the propellant was discharged, the spigot became the launching piston for the M388 atomic projectile; this was necessary because the fission round was unable to tolerate the stress of heavy acceleration, something which the spigot/piston, acting as a "pusher tube", was able to facilitate. In flight, four fins on the end deployed to stabilize trajectory and flight.

== Practice rounds ==
The M390 practice round was outwardly similar to the nuclear round and was designed to be a ballistic match for it. It contained 16 pounds (7.3 kg) of Composition B high explosive that was detonated by an electrical switch on impact with the ground. The practice round had a significant destructive effect in its own right and was intended to be used in combat in an emergency situation. A further type of dummy training round, the M421, was completely inert and not intended to be fired.

== Launcher ==
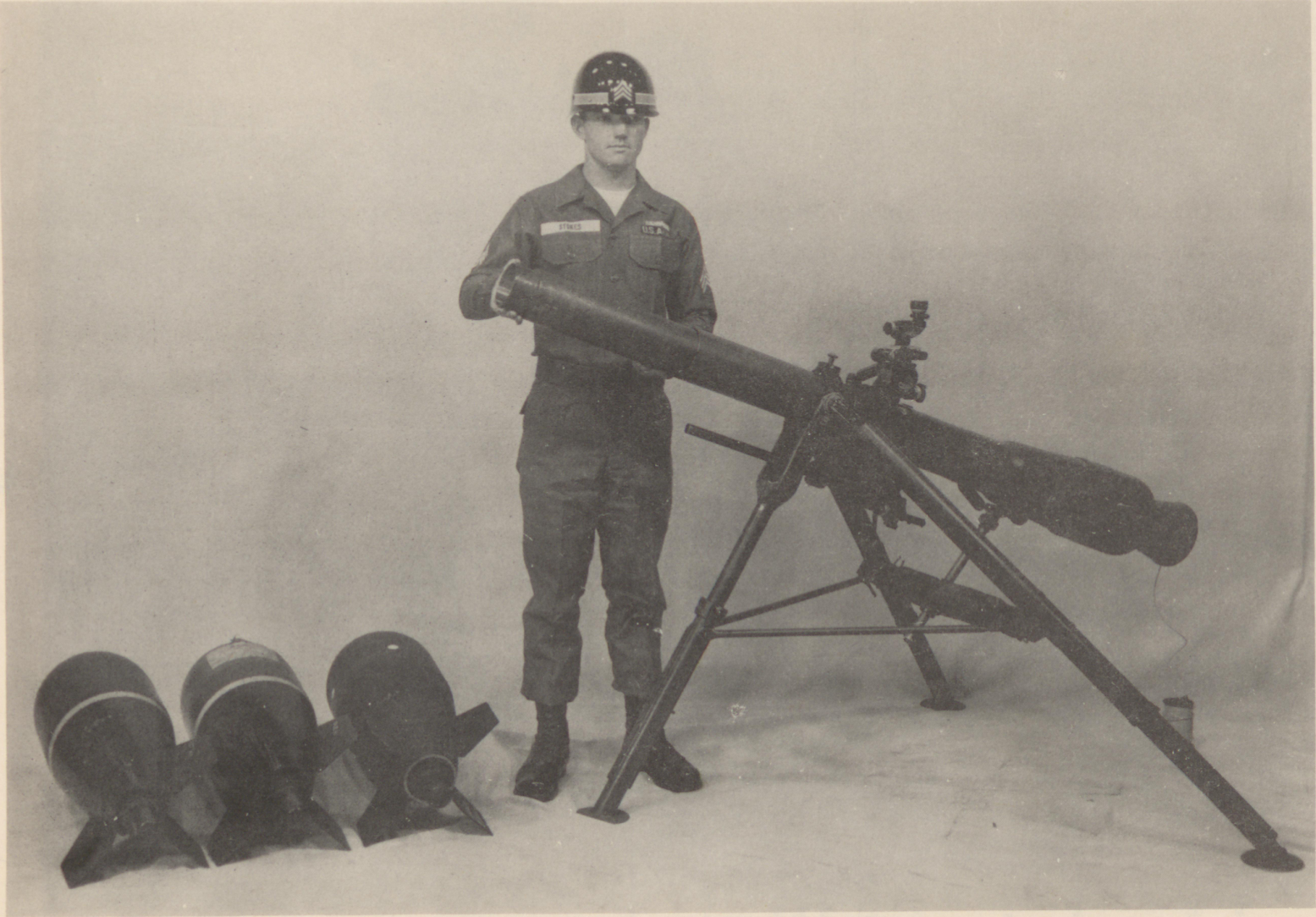
M-28 Launcher, 2km range

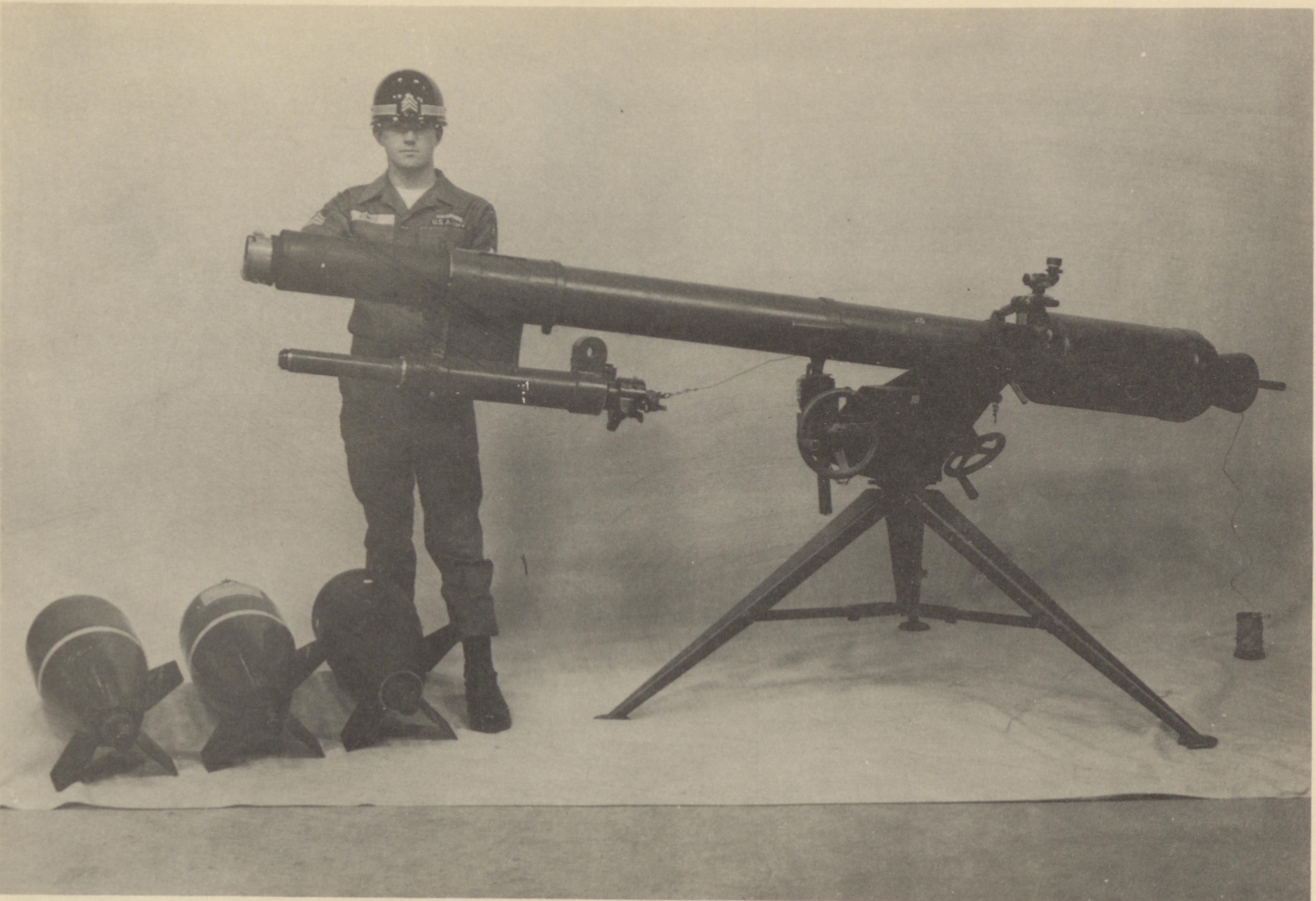
M-29 Launcher, 4km range

The two types of Davy Crocket launcher

The M388 could be launched from either of two launchers known as the Davy Crockett Weapon System(s): the 120 mm (4.7 in) M28, with a range of about 1.25 miles (2.01 km), or the 155 mm (6.1 in) M29, with a range of 2.5 miles (4.0 km).

The limited firing range was due to the combination of poor aerodynamics of the "watermelon with fins" (some soldiers referred to the warhead as the "atomic watermelon") type shape and the warhead's inability to withstand being fired like a traditional artillery round. This meant that it had to be fired out of a short range recoilless rifle.

Both weapons fired the same projectile, propelled using a separate cartridge. The smaller M28 used a 11 lb (5 kg) explosive cartridge to launch the warhead. The larger M29 used either a 11 lb or a 19 lb (8.5 kg) propellant charge, depending on the desired range. The launcher systems were muzzle loading weapons; a breechloading mechanism was unnecessary as they were intended for a very low rate of fire.

Davy Crockett launchers were either mounted on a tripod launcher transported by an M113 armored personnel carrier, or they were carried by a Jeep (the M38, and later the M38A1"D" variant). The Jeep was equipped with an attached launcher for the M28 or the M29, as required, whereas the Davy Crockett carried by an armored personnel carrier was set up in the field on a tripod away from the carrier. The M113 was equipped to carry up to ten nuclear rounds.

Weapons assigned to infantry units were carried in M113s, those allocated to airborne units were carried on Jeeps.

The M28 launcher was also equipped with a 20 mm spotting rifle – a single-shot weapon that fired depleted uranium rounds using a high–low system. These rounds flew a similar trajectory to the nuclear projectiles and produced white smoke when they landed, helping determine range.

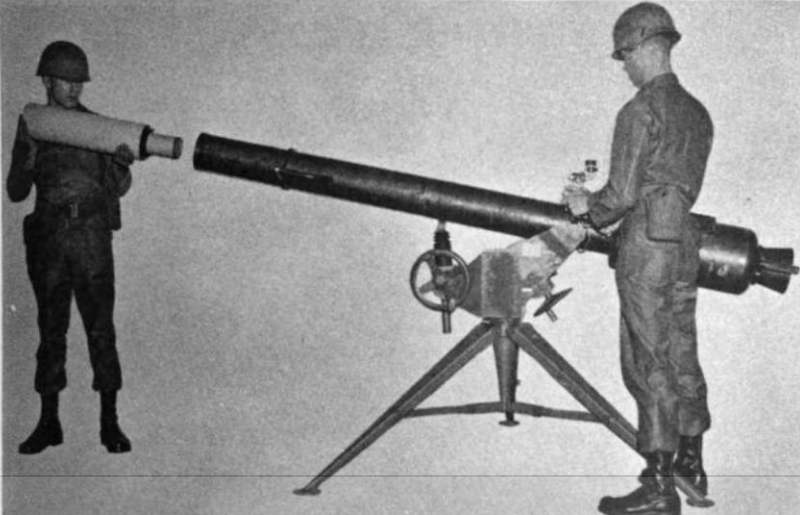
Propellant charge is loaded

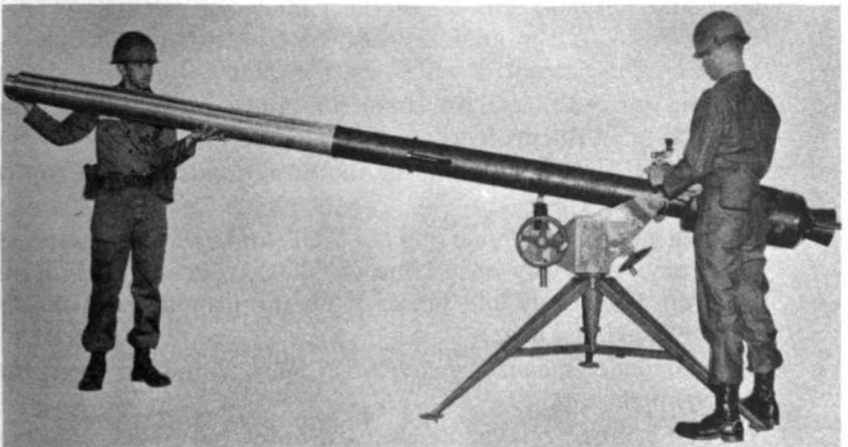
Launch piston is inserted

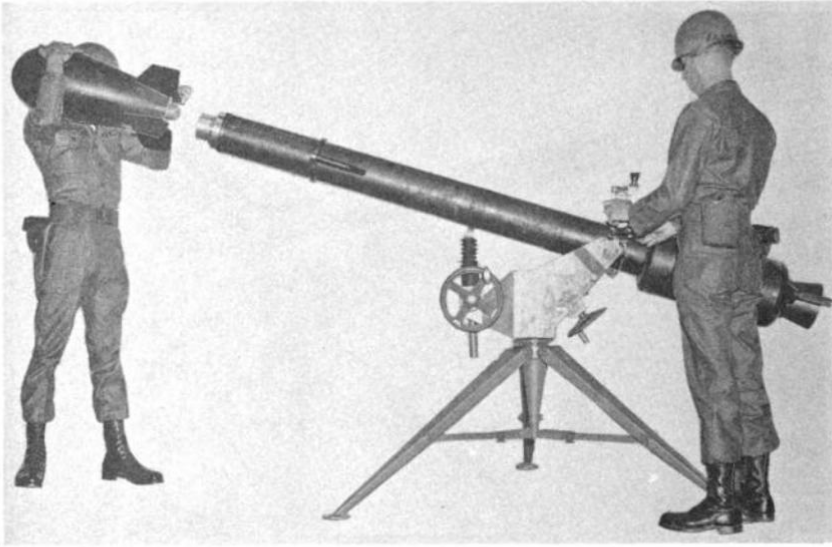
The M-388 nuclear round is attached to the launch piston

Loading a Davy Crockett M29 Launcher

The Davy Crockett was fired remotely. A mechanically-operated detonator at the end of 72 feet (22 m) of detonating cord led to the propellant charge. The M388 nuclear projectile was attached to a titanium piston by means of a bayonet mount. When fired, the piston was blown out of the tube by the detonating propellant. The piston was hollow and filled with high-pressure gas from the explosion, this pressure broke shear pins that connected the piston to the nuclear projectile, detaching it after a few meters of flight. The piston would hit the ground several hundred meters in front of the weapon while the projectile continued to the target.

The Davy Crocketts were operated by a five-man crew, the squad consisting of a Commander, Gunner, Assistant Gunner, Loader and Computer.

The commander of the M388 could issue use and have the weapon fired in a matter of minutes.

The weapon was made from lightweight metals – the tripod was aluminum, the barrel was titanium – and it was possible to break the smaller M28 weapon into three loads that could be carried by the crew, with the other two crew carrying two radios and accessories. The weight of the M28 launcher was 185 lb (84 kg) while the bigger M29 weighed 440 lb (200 kg).

Operating the M28 or M29 versions of the weapon with a three-man crew was also possible.

In the 3rd Armored Division in Germany in the 1960s many Davy Crockett Sections (all of which were in the Heavy Mortar Platoons, in Headquarters Companies of Infantry or Armor Maneuver Battalions) received what became a mix of M28 and M29 launchers (e.g., one of each per D/C section). Eventually, the M28s were replaced by M29s, so that both the armored personnel carriers and the Jeeps carried the M29.

== Effects ==
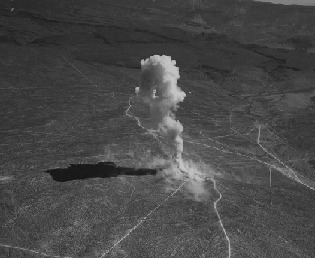
The weapon's mushroom cloud, July 17, 1962

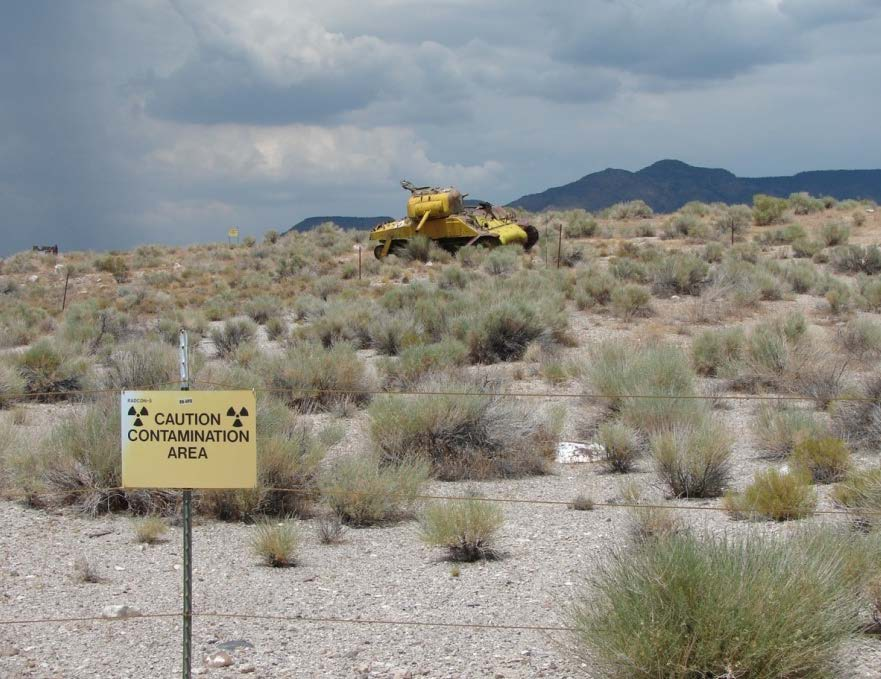
The Little Feller I nuclear test site in 2008.

Both recoilless guns proved to have good accuracy in testing, most training shots landing within ten feet (3.0 m) of the point of aim, and CEP under 160 feet (50 m), with a 100% instant casualty radius in excess of 520 feet (160 m). The shell's greatest effect would have been its extreme prompt neutron radiation which would have killed most of the enemy troops inside that circle within minutes. Its blast would do very little if any damage to the enemy's tracked vehicles. Troops further away would have died within hours, days and less than two weeks depending on their range from the point of burst and the effectiveness of their protection.

The weapon's blast was not a danger to the crew as long as they followed normal procedures. The Army created a standard for the crew to follow when firing the M388; they advised that the soldiers shelter their bodies behind a sloped hill and lie in prone position on the ground with their necks and heads covered.

The warhead was tested on July 7, 1962, in the Little Feller II weapons effects test shot, and again in an actual firing of the Davy Crockett from a distance of 1.7 miles (2.7 km) in the Little Feller I test shot on July 17, 1962. This was the last atmospheric test detonation at the Nevada Test Site.

== Spending ==
Development of this weapon proved to be costly in all aspects of design, modifications, and labor. From 1958 to 1963, total expenses soared to nearly $20 million (equivalent to $210 million in 2025). The initial allotted development costs varied from year to year, starting with $1.1 million in 1958, $9.15 million in 1959, $5 million in 1960, $2.4 million in 1961, $1.5 million in 1962, and $250,000 in 1963.

== Proposed German military use ==
In the late 1950s and early 1960s, one of the most fervent supporters of the Davy Crockett was West Germany's defense minister, Franz Josef Strauss. Strauss promoted the idea of equipping German brigades with the nuclear weapon, to be supplied by the US, arguing that this would allow German troops to become a much more effective factor in NATO's defense of Germany against a potential Soviet invasion. He argued that a single Davy Crockett could replace 40–50 salvos from a whole divisional artillery park – allowing the funds and troops normally needed for this artillery to be invested into further troops, or not having to be spent at all. US NATO commanders strongly opposed Strauss's ideas, as they would have made the use of tactical nuclear weapons almost mandatory in case of war, further reducing the ability of NATO to defend itself without resorting to atomic weapons.

== Concerns and potential problems ==
=== Radiation exposure ===
The Davy Crockett Weapon System's use of depleted uranium in the spotting round led to concerns about troop exposure to the material. Studies indicated that there was no risk of exposure to the material during use of the weapon.

As a nuclear munition, a strong safety program was required. This included providing render-safe procedure documentation to explosive ordnance personnel before delivery of the first warheads.

=== Accuracy ===
Program documentation for the weapon indicates that the weapon had a circular error probable (CEP) of less than 160 ft (50 m). Brigadier General Alvin Cowan, Assistant Division Commander of 3rd Armored Division, while discussing the weapon's retirement commended the technical design of the weapon.

== Other uses of the W54 warhead ==
The W54 warhead used by the Davy Crockett was initially developed for both the Davy Crockett and the AIM-4 Falcon air-to-air missile under the designation of XW-51. In January 1959, the development of the warhead was reassigned to Los Alamos Scientific Laboratory, and redesignated the XW-54. This produced the Mark 54 mod 0 and Mark 54 Mod 2 warheads for Falcon and Davy Crockett use respectively, which were only distinguishable by the environmental sensing device employed.

Later, the Special Atomic Demolition Munition (SADM – sometimes designated the B54) was developed and saw service between 1964 and 1989. SADM was so different from the W54 warhead that consideration was given to renaming the weapon with its own unique mark number. Mod numbers between the Mark 54/W54 and B54/SADM are not shared. A later development of the W54 was the W72 warhead for the AGM-62 Walleye television-guided glide bomb system.

== In popular culture ==
The Davy Crockett makes an appearance in the Metal Gear Solid 3: Snake Eater video game, where two of the devices are delivered to the Soviets by an American defector and used to destroy military bases in Russia.

The "Fatman" weapon seen in the Fallout series also shares many similarities with the Davy Crockett.

== Museum examples ==
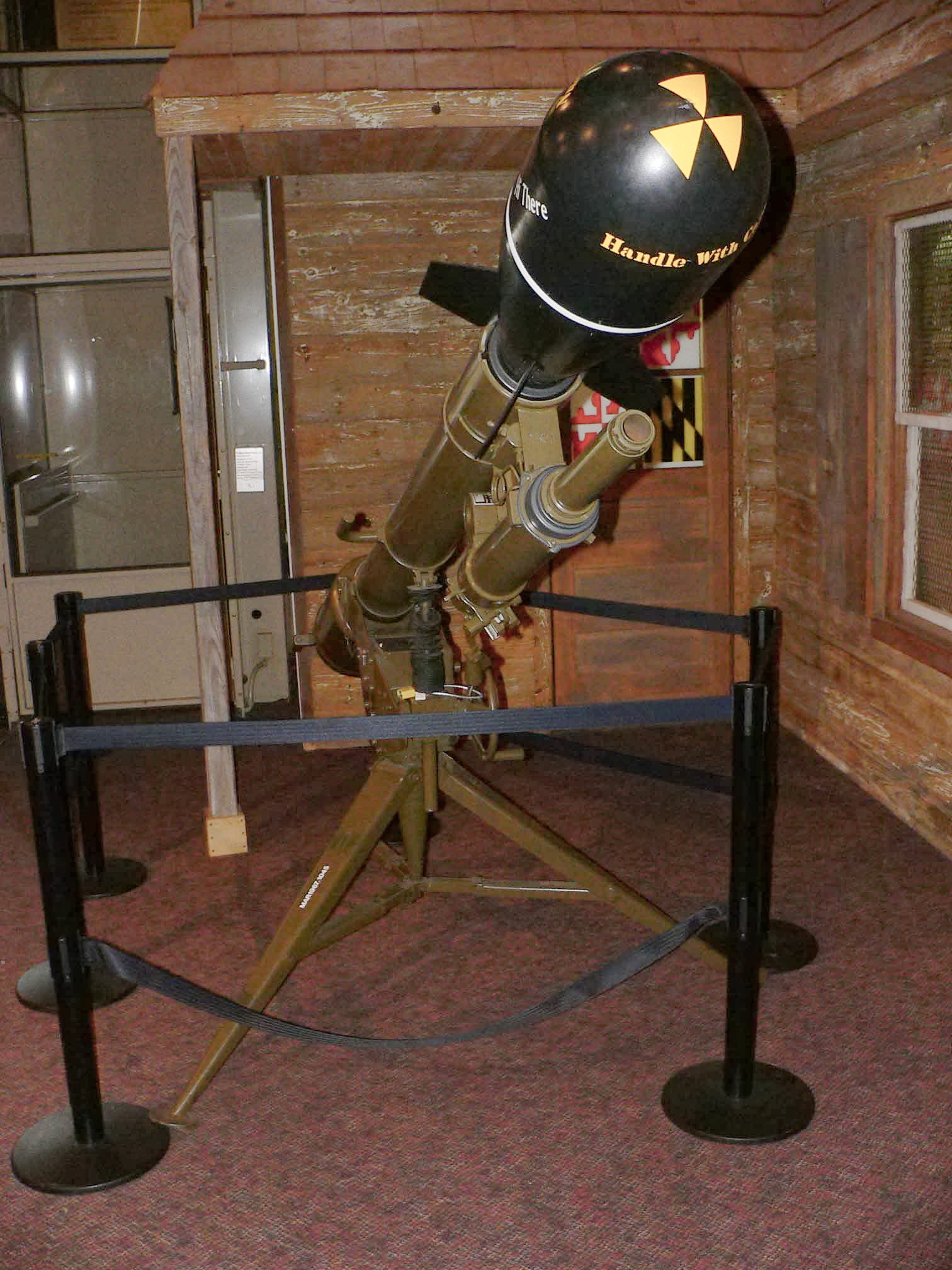
A Davy Crockett casing preserved in the United States Army Ordnance Museum

The following museums have a Davy Crockett casing in their collection:

- National Museum of the United States Army, Fort Belvoir, Fairfax County, Virginia
- Air Force Space and Missile Museum, Cape Canaveral Space Force Station, Florida
- National Museum of Nuclear Science & History, adjacent to Kirtland AFB, Albuquerque, New Mexico
- National Infantry Museum, Fort Benning, Georgia
- United States Army Ordnance Training and Heritage Center, Fort Gregg-Adams, Prince George County, Virginia (closed to public)
- Watervliet Arsenal Museum, Watervliet, New York
- West Point Museum, United States Military Academy, West Point, New York
- National Atomic Testing Museum, Las Vegas, Nevada
- Don F. Pratt Memorial Museum, Fort Campbell, Clarksville, Tennessee
