= Rob Verkerk =

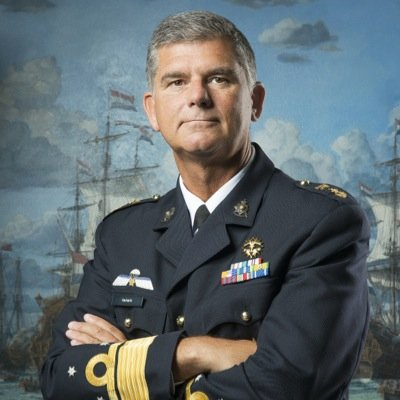
- Rob Verkerk, Commander of the Royal Netherlands Navy

Commander of the Royal Netherlands Navy
- In office 26 September 2014 – 22 September 2017
- Preceded by: Vice Admiral Matthieu Borsboom
- Succeeded by: Vice Admiral Rob Kramer

Personal details
- Born: 17 April 1960 (age 66) The Hague

Military service
- Allegiance: Netherlands
- Branch/service: Royal Netherlands Navy, Netherlands Marine Corps
- Years of service: 1978–2017
- Rank: Lieutenant General
- Battles/wars: Cold War; Bosnian War

Lieutenant general Robert (Rob) Verkerk (born 17 April 1960, The Hague) is a retired officer of the Netherlands Marine Corps who served as the 4th Commander of the Naval Forces from 26 september 2014 untl his retirement on 22 september 2017. he was succeeded by Rob Kramer

== Naval career ==
Verkerk began his career in the Royal Netherlands Navy in 1978 at the Koninklijk Instituut voor de Marine. In 1982 he became officer. After that he underwent commando, parachutist and ski instructor training among other things. He became commanding officer of different Marine platoons, companies and battalions. In the 1990s he was sent to Bosnia and Herzegovina.

Obtaining the rank of a brigadier general Verkerk became Director Operations CZSK in 2007 and Commander of the Marine Corps at the same time. In 2012 he was promoted to major general and became Deputy Commander of the Naval Forces.

On 26 September 2014 he followed vice admiral Matthieu Borsboom and became Commander Naval Forces and was promoted to lieutenant general.

On 22 September 2017 Verkerk retired and subsequently handed command over to his successor Rob Kramer.
