= Tactical nuclear weapon =

Nuclear weapon designed for use on a battlefield

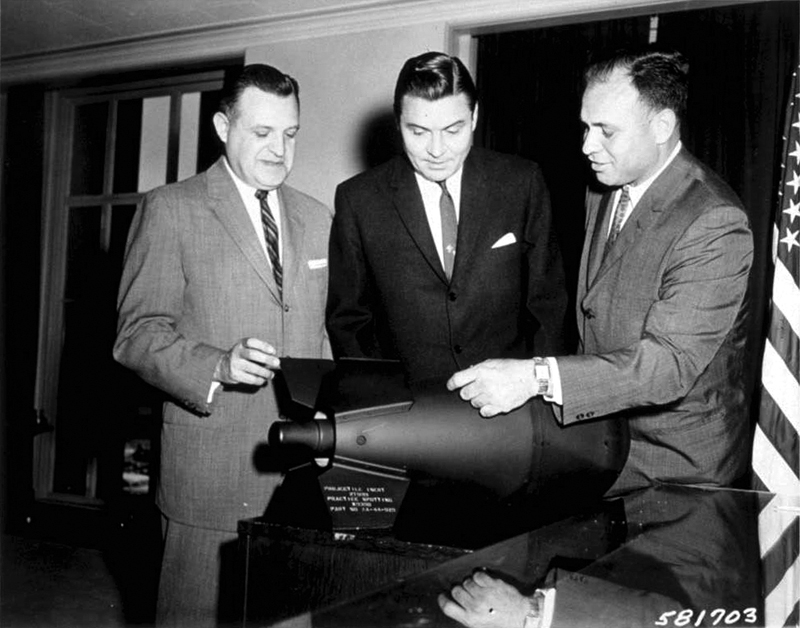
U.S. officials view a W54 nuclear warhead (with a 10- or 20-ton explosive yield) as used on the Davy Crockett recoilless gun, one of the smallest nuclear weapons ever made.

A tactical nuclear weapon (TNW) or non-strategic nuclear weapon (NSNW) is a nuclear weapon that is designed to be used on a battlefield in military situations. Generally lower in explosive power, TNW are defined in contrast to strategic nuclear weapons, which are mostly designed to be targeted against military bases, cities, industries, and other strategic forces. Though hundreds of types of tactical nuclear weapons have been developed and deployed since the 1950s, none have ever been used in combat.

Tactical nuclear weapons were first developed in the early Cold War for specific theorized military missions, and have included unguided bombs, shorter-range missiles, artillery shells, depth charges, torpedoes, surface-to-air missiles and air-to-air missiles. As of 2026, tactical nuclear weapons are explicitly present (in differing quantities) in the arsenals of the United States, Russia, and North Korea, and tactical capabilities which indicate non-strategic nuclear planning are known to exist in the arsenals of China, Israel, India, and Pakistan.

== Definition ==
There is no precise or universally held definition of tactical nuclear weapon, and most TNW systems are defined by their intended mission. In contrast to strategic nuclear weapons, TNW are typically understood to be lower-yield weapons (i.e., in the range of sub-kiloton to 50 kt TNT equivalent), delivered by battlefield-relevant systems (e.g. bombs carried on fighter-bombers or short-range ballistic missiles), and likely operated by lower-level troops, rather than strategic forces.

As a primarily mission-driven distinction, the presumed category of any given nuclear weapon depends largely on the statements of its government or military, as well as the context in which it may be used. This subjectivity may be complicated by ambiguity, fog-of-war, variable-yield systems and delivery system overlaps, and some weapons could be considered to be capable of both tactical or strategic missions, depending on the potential context for use. For example, an Indian nuclear missile with a 500-km range may be considered tactical when it is evaluated by Russia, but would be considered strategic if evaluated by Pakistan.

== History ==
Shortly after the development of the first nuclear weapons, military and political leaders sought to identify how the nuclear bomb could be leveraged for maximum military utility. While the earliest produced nuclear bombs offered explosive yields of around 15 to 20 kilotons, such weapons necessitated delivery by heavy bombers, and it would take further weapons and policy developments before distinctly tactical applications became clear.

=== Cold War ===
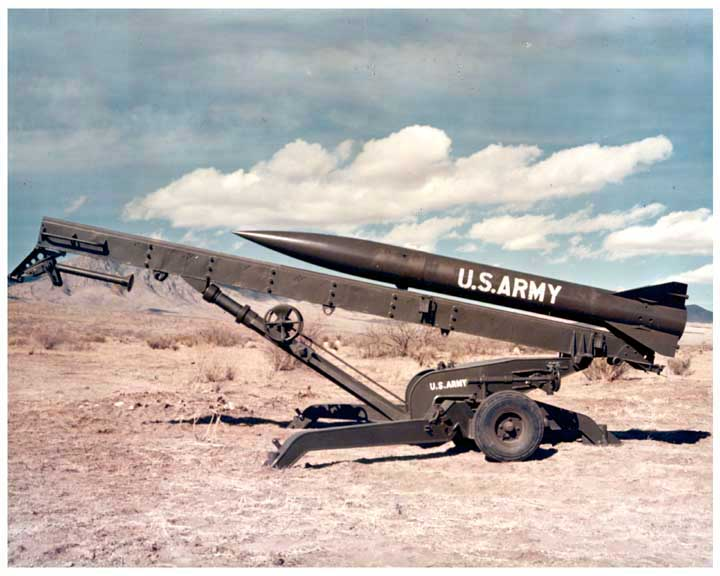
American MGR-3 Little John missile, measuring 4.4 meters long with a diameter of 32 cm and a weight of 350 kg. It was capable of firing a W45 warhead (10 kilotons) a distance of 19 km.

Besides the obvious capacity for city-destruction as demonstrated in the 1945 nuclear attacks against Hiroshima and Nagasaki, early American planners identified nuclear weapons as a potential way to balance the conventional numerical advantage of the Soviet Union. The first mass-produced nuclear weapon specifically built for tactical applications was the Mark-4 gravity bomb, introduced in 1949 and featuring yield options from 1 to 31 kilotons. Its introduction supported the American "offset strategy," in which a growing tactical nuclear stockpile was positioned to deter potential Soviet expansionism. The Soviet Union introduced its own TNW in 1951, arming the R-2 short-range ballistic missile with a nuclear warhead. The United Kingdom introduced its Mark 5 and Mark 7 tactical gravity bombs in 1958, and forward-deployed them to squadrons based in Germany.

The early period of the Cold War was thus characterized by a rapid build-up of all kinds of nuclear weapons as technologies surged. It was in these years that tactical nuclear warheads appeared in the greatest numbers and on the widest set of delivery systems, including some famous examples such as the Davy Crockett recoilless rifle, the "Genie" air-to-air rocket, and various man-portable demolitions devices. By 1970, the US, USSR, UK, and France had developed and deployed at least 86 kinds of TNW.

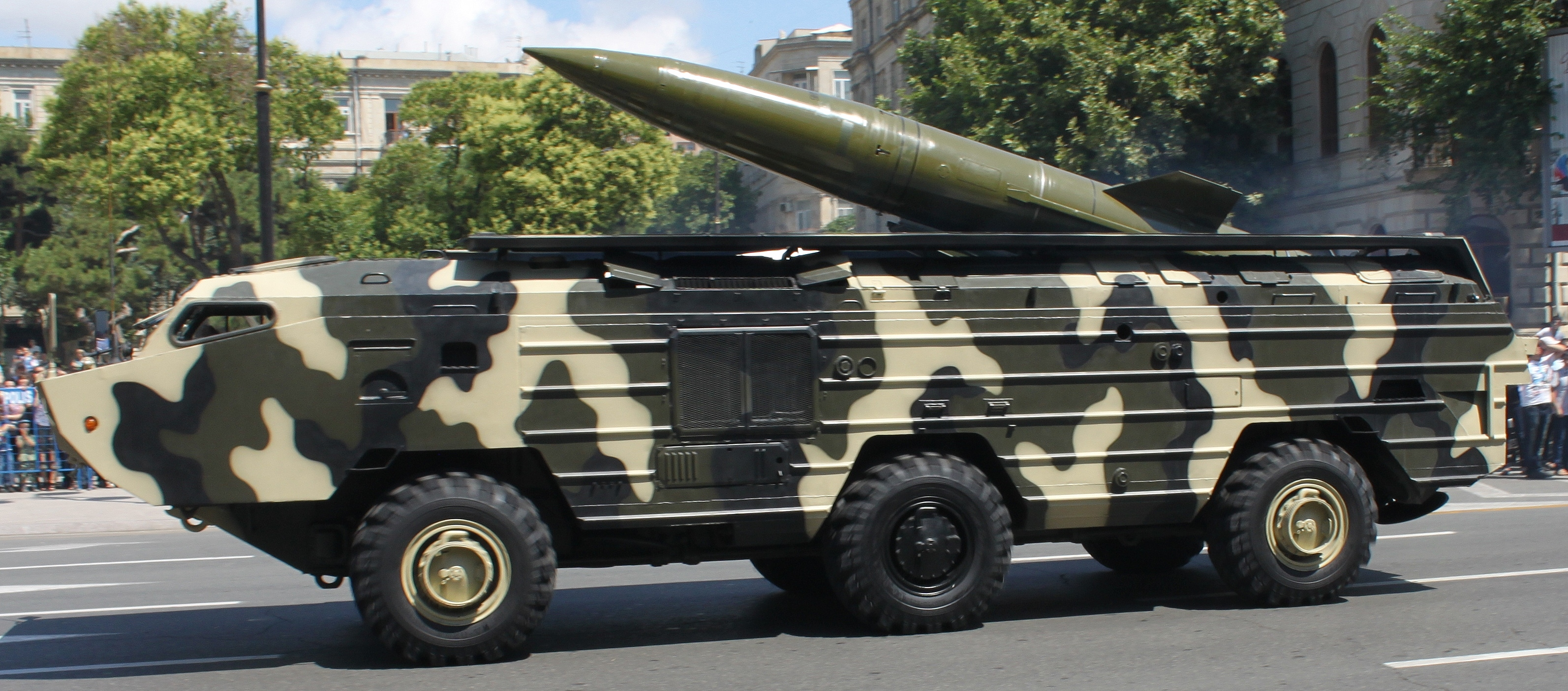
Soviet OTR-21 Tochka missile. Capable of firing a 100-kiloton nuclear warhead a distance of 185 km.

As the Cold War progressed and early arms control efforts were initiated, the number of TNW in the world began to fall. By the 1980s, first-generation tactical bombs and missiles were replaced by more advanced capabilities, and the eventual rise of precision-strike munitions reduced the number of targets which required the power of a nuclear explosion to be held at risk. The mid-1980s in particular were marked by high US-Soviet tensions, and resulting arms control initiatives recognized that TNW can introduce unique risks and strain a deterrence relationship. The Intermediate-range Nuclear Forces Treaty, in particular, addressed this by eliminating nuclear missile systems with ranges between 500 km and 5,500 km.

As the Cold War came to a close, both Soviet and American leaders undertook unilateral but reciprocal initiatives to drastically cut the number and types of TNW within their arsenals. By the end of the 1990s, the US and Russia had sharply reduced their number and types of TNW, and the UK had eliminated their stock entirely.

=== 21st Century Developments ===
Following the arms-reduction efforts of the 1990s, a period of relative cooperation between the US and Russia reduced the salience of nuclear weapons in general. By the early 2000s, the US maintained its legacy nuclear-sharing deployments of B61 bombs (versions of which are considered tactical) in Europe as well as tactical capabilities for its AGM-86 ALCM, while Russia maintained a more diverse set of built-for-purpose TNW systems in its naval and air force stocks.

Two B61-12 low-yield tactical nuclear gravity bomb joint test assemblies are loaded on a F-35A for a flight test on Aug. 19 2025.

Despite the calming trend between former Cold War rivals, this period also saw the proliferation of nuclear weapons to India, Pakistan, and North Korea. In South Asia, Indian and Pakistani defense strategies are shaped largely by geography, with direct and unique implications for the perceived need for weapon ranges, blast strengths, and signaling capacity. For North Korea, weapons developments following the 2017 long-range missile breakout and nuclear test have largely focused on building a TNW capability for short-ranged missiles and rockets, and a strategy focused on preemption.

From the 2010s, a steadily growing sense of competition between the US and Russia (especially following its 2022 invasion of Ukraine) became intensified by a growing American anxiety over perceptions of China's nuclear build-up. This has resulted in a renewed debate over the roles and value of TNW systems.

In 2018, Russian President Vladimir Putin announced a series of new "super weapons" notionally intended to evade American missile defenses. Of these, the 3M22 "Zircon" anti-ship missile and the Kh42 "Kinzhal" air-launched ballistic missile are considered to be tactical nuclear-capable systems, adding to a large number of existing Russian TNW systems and raising concerns over shifts within Russian nuclear strategy broadly. In 2023, the US Congress directed the development of a new sea-launched nuclear cruise missile intended to serve on currently non nuclear-armed submarines or surface vessels. In 2024, the US Air Force began replacing its B61 gravity bomb as stationed at its nuclear-sharing bases in Europe with a modernized version. While China has not publicly announced the development of TNW, its growing theater-range and dual-capable missile capabilities indicate a potential tactical mission.

== Roles in nuclear strategy ==
Upshot-Knothole Grable nuclear artillery test, May 25, 1953.

Tactical nuclear weapons have long sparked debate among strategists over the benefits and risks of introducing such systems to a nation's arsenal.

The earliest thinking in favor of TNW utility was around the "offset strategy," which argues that the military utility of local and smaller nuclear blasts could prove a decisive edge in a particular battle, and potentially favorably shape the overall prosecution of a war. As technologies and strategies matured during the Cold War, this military-utility argument gave way to wider strategic thinking: that building a capacity for nuclear use at a "lower level" might be necessary to support the credibility of a higher-level deterrent. In this way, TNWs gain a good deal of their perceived utility not as a munition, but as a signal. Advocates of this position see benefits in having more capability options as a way to potentially prevent strategic escalation by exercising escalation dominance at lower levels of fighting.

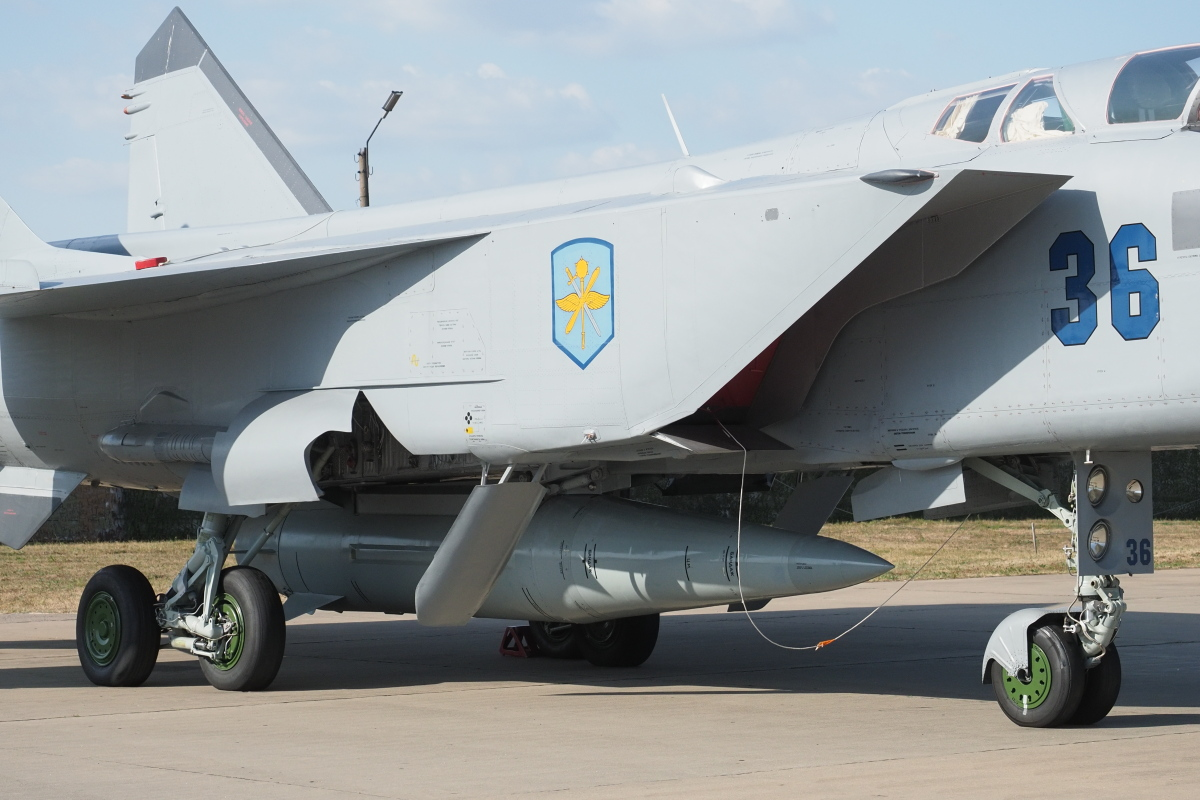
A training mockup of the Kh-47M2 Kinzhal hypersonic aero-ballistic air-to-surface missile mounted on a Russian Air Force MiG-31K.

Critics of TNW-leveraging strategies have long pointed to the risks of both fielding and potentially using such weapons. Even without nuclear use, the presence of TNW in national stockpiles may drive risk-exacerbating behaviors, such as forward-deploying critical resources and lowering the perceived threshold for nuclear use of any kind. The potential use of tactical nuclear weapons also presents an untested and unpredictable risk of escalating a conflict until it reaches a tipping point that provokes the use of strategic nuclear weapons. Critics also argue that the various strategic effects of nuclear weapons are not meaningfully reduced by limited or lower-yield use, and crossing the nuclear barrier in any conflict would create dangerous social and political reverberations, erasing any potential short-term gains.

Studies and exercises have long investigated the various risks of TNW strategies and potential scenarios for use.

== Threats of use ==
=== Russian invasion of Ukraine ===
During the Russian invasion of Ukraine, there was speculation in 2022 about whether Russia's president Vladimir Putin would use a tactical nuclear weapon either against Ukraine or in a demonstration strike over unpopulated areas, and several members of the Russian government have threatened the use of nuclear weapons.

On 25 March 2023, President Putin announced the stationing of tactical nuclear weapons in Belarus. Russia would maintain control of the weapons. As of May 2023 the weapons are a small number of Iskander missile warheads. Russia planned to finish a “storage facility” for tactical nuclear weapons by July 1. President Putin told Russian state television: "There is nothing unusual here either…Firstly, the United States has been doing this for decades. They have long deployed their tactical nuclear weapons on the territory of their allied countries." In December 2023, Belarusian president Alexander Lukashenko announced that the nuclear weapons deliveries were completed that October.

In May 2024, Putin announced that Russia would be holding drills with tactical nuclear weapons, days after responding to comments from senior Western officials.

=== 2025 India–Pakistan crisis ===
Between 23 April and 10 May 2025, a crisis emerged between India and Pakistan, sparked by the killing of 26 tourists by the militants in Kashmir. On 9 May After days of sharply escalating cross-border air strikes, Prime Minister Shehbaz Sharif convened Pakistan's National Command Authority, the governmental body responsible for decisions regarding its nuclear weapons capabilities. Analysts have since identified the move as an example of nuclear signaling, leveraging Pakistan's implicit TNW strategy to communicate within the crisis.

== In popular culture ==
Tactical nuclear weapons comprise a gameplay mechanic within the Call of Duty franchise in which a player can earn a "tactical nuke" strike call-in which ends the round with a win for the user.

Tactical nuclear weapons serve as the MacGuffin in Tom Clancy's 1991 novel The Sum of All Fears, as an Israeli TNW is misplaced and the material from it is later repurposed by terrorists to construct a crude fission bomb.

== See also ==
- List of nuclear weapons
- Strategic nuclear weapon
- Neutron bomb
- Nuclear strategy
