= Admiral Benelux =

Joint commanding officer of the Belgian and Dutch navies

- Standard of the ABNL

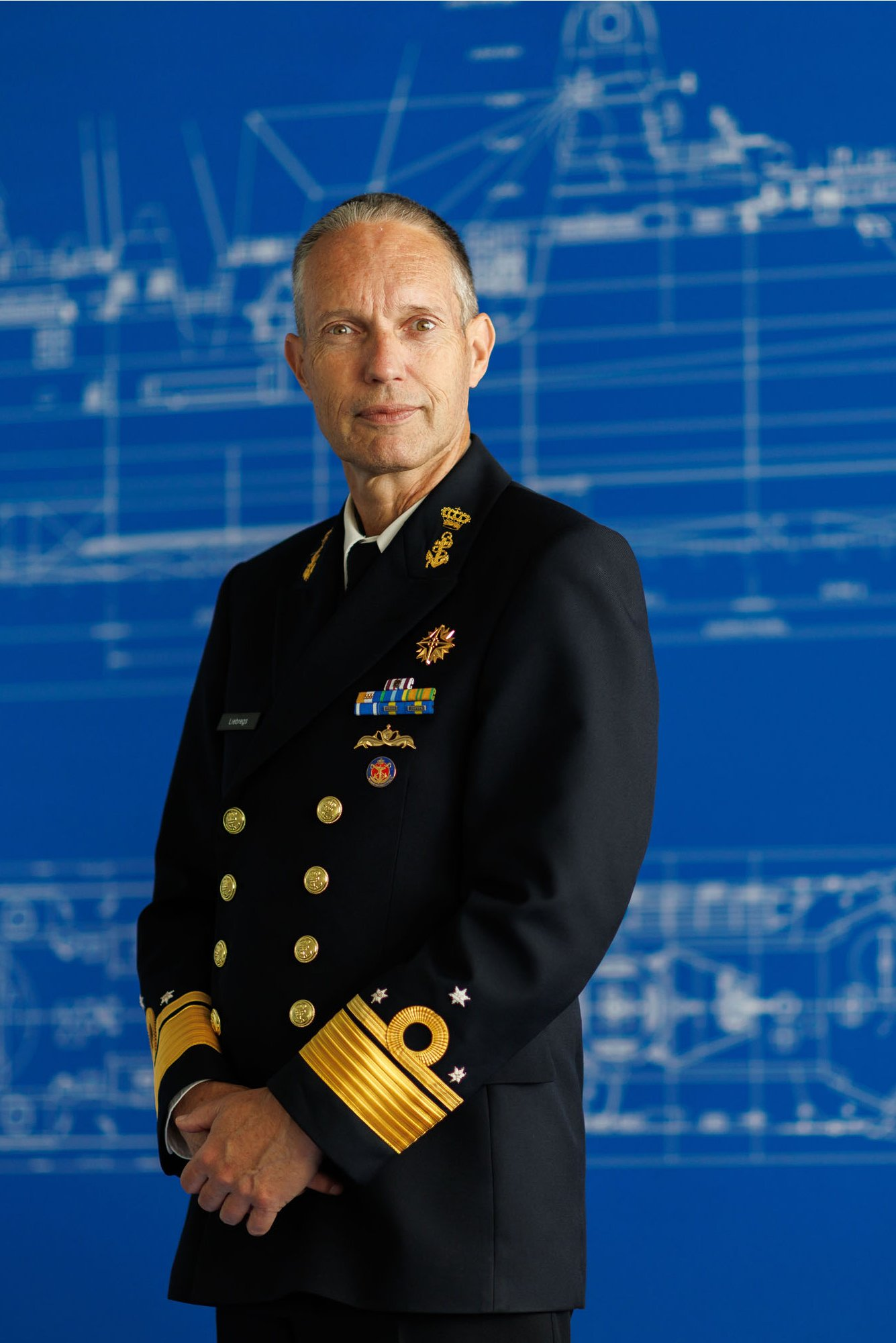
- Incumbent; Vice Admiral Harold Liebregs since September 2025
- Royal Netherlands Navy; Belgian Navy
- Abbreviation: ABNL
- Formation: 1 January 1996
- First holder: G.G. Hooft
- Deputy: Commander of the Belgian Navy

The Admiral Benelux (ABNL) is the commanding officer of the combined military staff of the Royal Netherlands Navy and the Belgian Navy.

The position of ABNL was created together with the combination of the Staffs of the two contributing navies on March 28, 1995, in the BeNeSam Accord. The ABNL is responsible for the combined operations of the Dutch and Belgian navies and can be tasked with the responsibility for the operational readiness and deployment of the combined fleets in joint operations, both in war- and peacetime operations. Most of all the ABNL is responsible for the efficient use of joint material and personnel and oversees the joint training programs of the two navies.

The current ABNL is Vice Admiral Harold Liebregs who is also serving as the Commander of the Royal Netherlands Navy.

== Organizational structure ==
The Admiral Benelux is the commanding officer of the joint staffs who, together, form the Directorate of Operations (DOPS). The ABNL is assisted by the Deputy ABNL (DABNL). Under the terms of the BENESAM Accord, the ABNL position is held by the Commander of the Royal Netherlands Navy. The DABNL position is held by the Commander of the Belgian Navy. The DOPS is headquartered with the Royal Netherlands Navy in Den Helder.

The main body of the ABNL command is the DOPS, although there is also a Directorate of Operational Support (DOST). The two together have operational control of the operational units of the two fleets. DOPS is divided into three branches: command, operational and support.

- The command section of DOPS consists of the Staff Bureau and the Maritime Situation Center (MARSITCEN). The MARSITCEN is organized into a NATO standard N-structure and functions as the link of DOPS to the Belgian and Dutch Naval Command Centers.
- The operations branch of DOPS consists mainly of the Netherlands Maritime Force (NLMARFOR). NLMARFOR consists of the operational staff that can take direct command to execute missions and is equipped with the logistics facilities to coordinate naval missions and exercises. In addition to NLMARFOR, the operations branch of DOPS consists of the joint training programs for naval personnel: the Sea Training Command (STC) for the navies and the Marine Training Command (MTC) for the marine corps.
- The support branch of DOPS consists of the Marine Warfare Centre (MWC). This center comprises two different groups (the Maritime Doctrine and Tactics Centre and the Centre for Operational Data, Analysis and METOC). The MWC is responsible for analysis and management of operational, tactical and strategic data used by DOPS.

== History of the ABNL command ==
The combined staff (sometimes referred to as the Benelux Admiralty) is a result of developing naval cooperation between the Royal Netherlands Navy and the Belgian Navy. This cooperation was first geared at mutual battlefield cooperation and later at mutual defense in the Cold War as part of NATO's Allied Command Channel (ACCHAN). One of ACCHAN's subordinate commands was the Benelux Sub-Area Channel Command (BENECHAN) based in Den Helder and consisting of the Belgian and Dutch navies. After the end of the Cold War the focus of the Dutch-Belgian cooperation turned more and more to the efficient use of equipment and personnel (also driven by cutbacks in military spending after the collapse of the Soviet Union).

The ABNL was created in a series of treaties known as the Belgium-Netherlands Cooperation Accord (BENESAM, for Belgisch-Nederlandse Samenwerking), starting in 1948:

- 10 May 1948: Signing of the first BENESAM Accord.
- 27 March 1975: The ABNL is established for wartime operations.
- 15 October 1985: Revision of the BENESAM Accord.
- 28 March 1995: The Dutch State Secretary of Defence and the Belgian Minister of Defence sign the ABNL Accord.
- 29 May 1995: The Commander of Dutch Naval Forces (Commandant Zeemacht Nederland (CZMNED)) and the Belgian Chief of Naval Staff (Stafchef Zeemacht (ZS)) sign an accord regarding operational cooperation.
- 1 January 1996: The ABNL command is established in the Naval Headquarters and Coast Guard Centre (MHKC) in Den Helder.
- 1 May 1996: The Commander of Dutch Naval Forces (Commandant Zeemacht Nederland (CZMNED)) and the Belgian Chief of Naval Staff (Stafchef Zeemacht (ZS)) sign an accord regarding joint training.

The BENESAM Accord is currently undergoing revision, with an eye towards even closer cooperation between the two fleets.
