= Tom Middendorp =

Dutch general (born 1960)

General Tom Middendorp
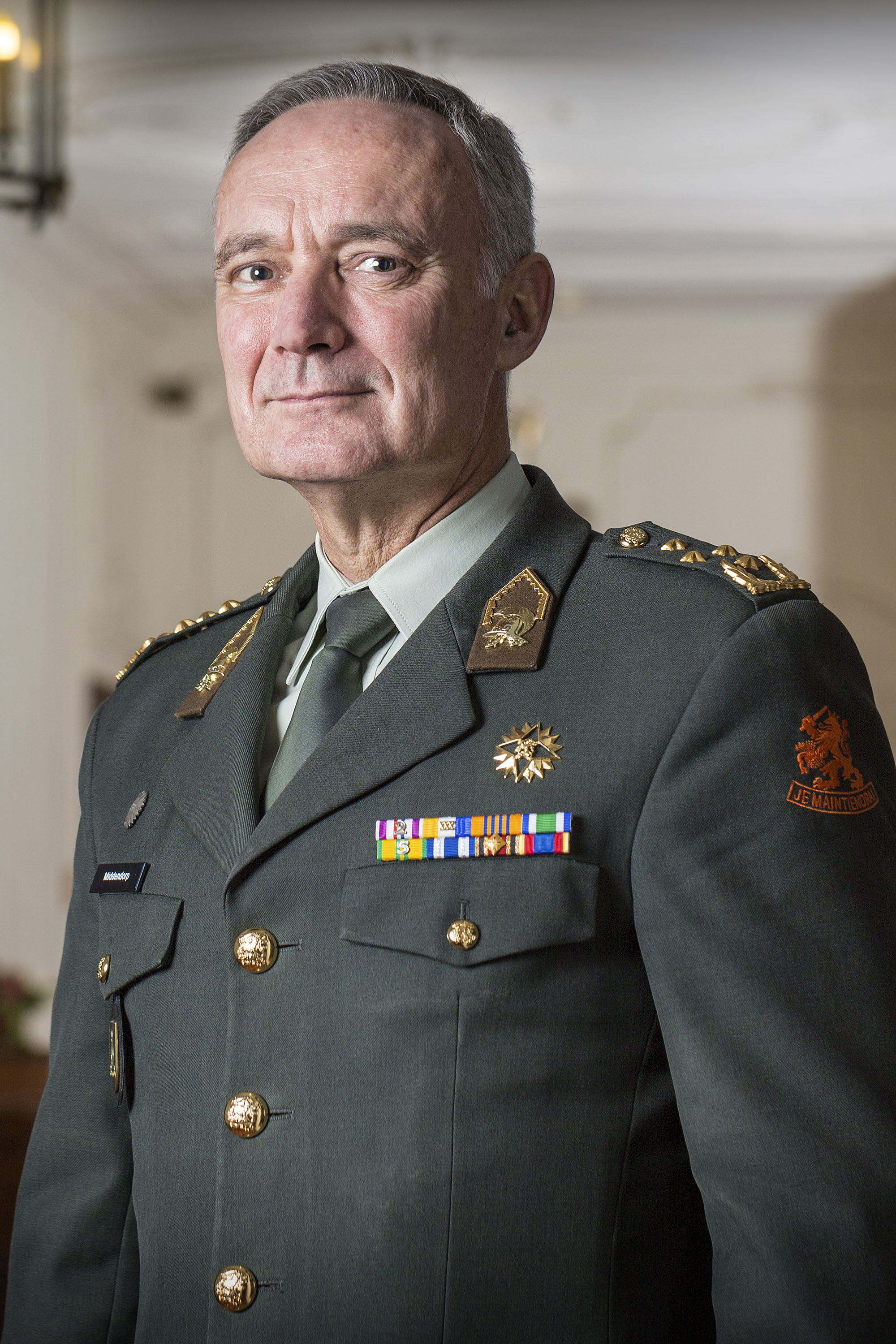
- Middendorp in 2015

Chief of Defence
- In office 28 June 2012 – 3 October 2017
- Preceded by: General Peter van Uhm
- Succeeded by: Lieutenant admiral Rob Bauer

Personal details
- Born: Thomas Antonius Middendorp; 6 September 1960 (age 66) Rheden, Netherlands
- Awards: Officer of the Order of Australia; Adjutant to the King

Military service
- Allegiance: Netherlands
- Branch/service: Royal Netherlands Army
- Years of service: 1979–2017
- Rank: General
- Commands: Chief of Defence; Task Force Uruzgan; 13th Light Brigade
- Battles/wars: Cold War; Bosnian War; Stabilisation Force (SFOR); War on terror; Iraq War; War in Afghanistan; Northern Mali conflict

Thomas Antonius Middendorp (born 6 September 1960) is a retired general of the Royal Netherlands Army. He served as Chief of Defence of the Armed forces of the Netherlands from 28 June 2012 until 3 October 2017. He previously served as the commander of Task Force Uruzgan part of the International Security Assistance Force from 2 February 2009 until 3 August 2009.

== Early life ==
Middendorp was born on 6 September 1960 in Rheden in the Province of Gelderland.

== Military career ==
Middendorp joined the Dutch Army in 1979, attending officers training at the Koninklijke Militaire Academie in Breda. Opting to join the Engineering Corps, he followed up his academy training with an additional one-year course at the Engineering Training Centre in Vught.

Having completed his training, Middendorp was posted to Ermelo in 1984 where he was given command of an armored engineering unit. He held this command for two years, after which (in 1986) he was transferred to Breda. He was posted to the Defence Real Estate Management Agency regional directorate as head of the project management agency. In 1989 he was transferred to the Dutch Army base in Seedorf, where he assumed the command of the B company, 41st Engineering Battalion.

From 1992 to 1994 Middendorp attended Command School (in Dutch): Hogere Militaire Vorming. Following this training he was posted to the Army staff and put in charge of developing and implementing new real estate management policy in light of the deactivation of the Dutch draft. Completing this posting Middendorp attended the United States Army Command and General Staff College starting in 1996.

In 1997 Middendorp was assigned the post of military assistant to the Deputy Chief of the Netherlands Defence Staff. Following this posting he was reassigned to Münster in 1999, as chief of the National Planning Bureau for the I. German/Dutch Corps. He held this post until 2001, when he was given command of the 101 Engineering Battalion in Wezep. As first commander of this battalion he was responsible for setting up the battalion and during the next 2 1/2 years commanded it through missions in Bosnia-Hercegovina, the Republic of Macedonia and Iraq.

Following this command, Middendorp was promoted to colonel and posted to the Ministry of Defence as policy coordinator for the chief director of general affairs. In this posting he advised the minister of defence on national deployment of the armed forces and established several cooperation agreements between the Ministry of Defence and other ministries.

Towards the end of 2006, Middendorp was posted overseas for his first tour in Afghanistan, as Senior Political Advisor and Deputy NATO Senior Civil Representative (SCR). Mid-2007 he did a short stint with the Dutch Army Command as head of the Command Support Department; he was given command of the 13th Mechanised Brigade in Oirschot on 11 January 2008.

He was posted back to Afghanistan in February 2009 as commanding officer of the multinational Task Force Uruzgan (TFU6, specifically). Returning to the Netherlands he was promoted to major-general in August 2009, and was appointed director of operations of the Royal Netherlands Defence Staff on 24 December.

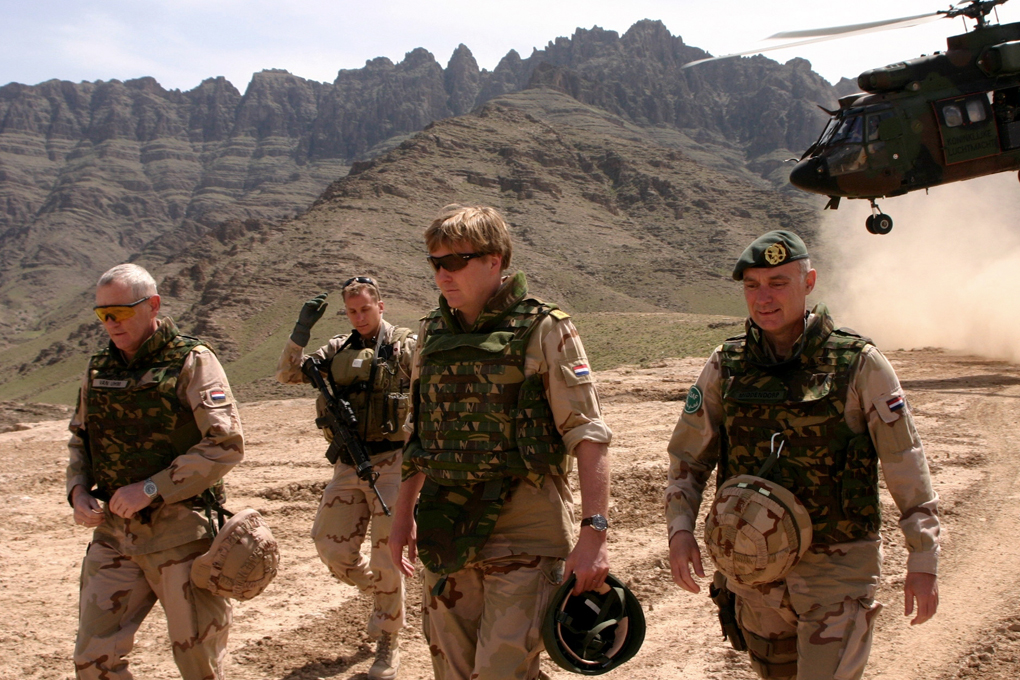
Middendorp (right) and King Willem-Alexander (centre), 2014

The minister of defence announced Middendorp's selection as next chief of defence on 28 September 2011. In preparation for his new role, Middendorp was promoted lieutenant general on 1 January 2012 and placed in charge of projects and operations at the Defence Staff. He was promoted Four-star general on 28 June 2012, the date on which general Peter van Uhm transferred command of the Netherlands Defence Staff to him.

In 2014 he carried the sword of state during the inauguration of Willem-Alexander in his capacity as Chief of Defense.

On 28 February 2017 Middendorp was appointed an honorary Officer of the Order of Australia (AO). He was invested by the Governor General of Australia Sir Peter Cosgrove.

On 11 January 2018 King Willem-Alexander of the Netherlands appointed Middendorp as adjutant in extraordinary service of the King.

== Resignation ==
Middendorp resigned on 3 October 2017 following the publication of a critical report into the death of two Dutch soldiers in a training accident in Mali and the resignation of Minister of Defence Jeanine Hennis-Plasschaert. Lieutenant admiral Rob Bauer took on as Chief of Defence.

== Honors and awards ==
- Commander of the Order of Legion of Honour
- Grand Officer of the Order of the Crown (Belgium)
- Commander of the Order of Orange-Nassau
- Grand Commander Order of Merit of the Federal Republic of Germany

Military offices
Preceded by Leen Noordzij	Commander of the 13th Light Brigade; 2008–2009	Succeeded by Michiel van der Laan
Preceded by Kees Matthijssen	Commander of Task Force Uruzgan; 2009	Succeeded by Marc van Uhm
Preceded by Peter van Uhm	Chief of Defence of the Armed forces of the Netherlands; 2012–2017	Succeeded by Rob Bauer
