= Rob Bauer =

Dutch 4-star Admiral (born 1962)

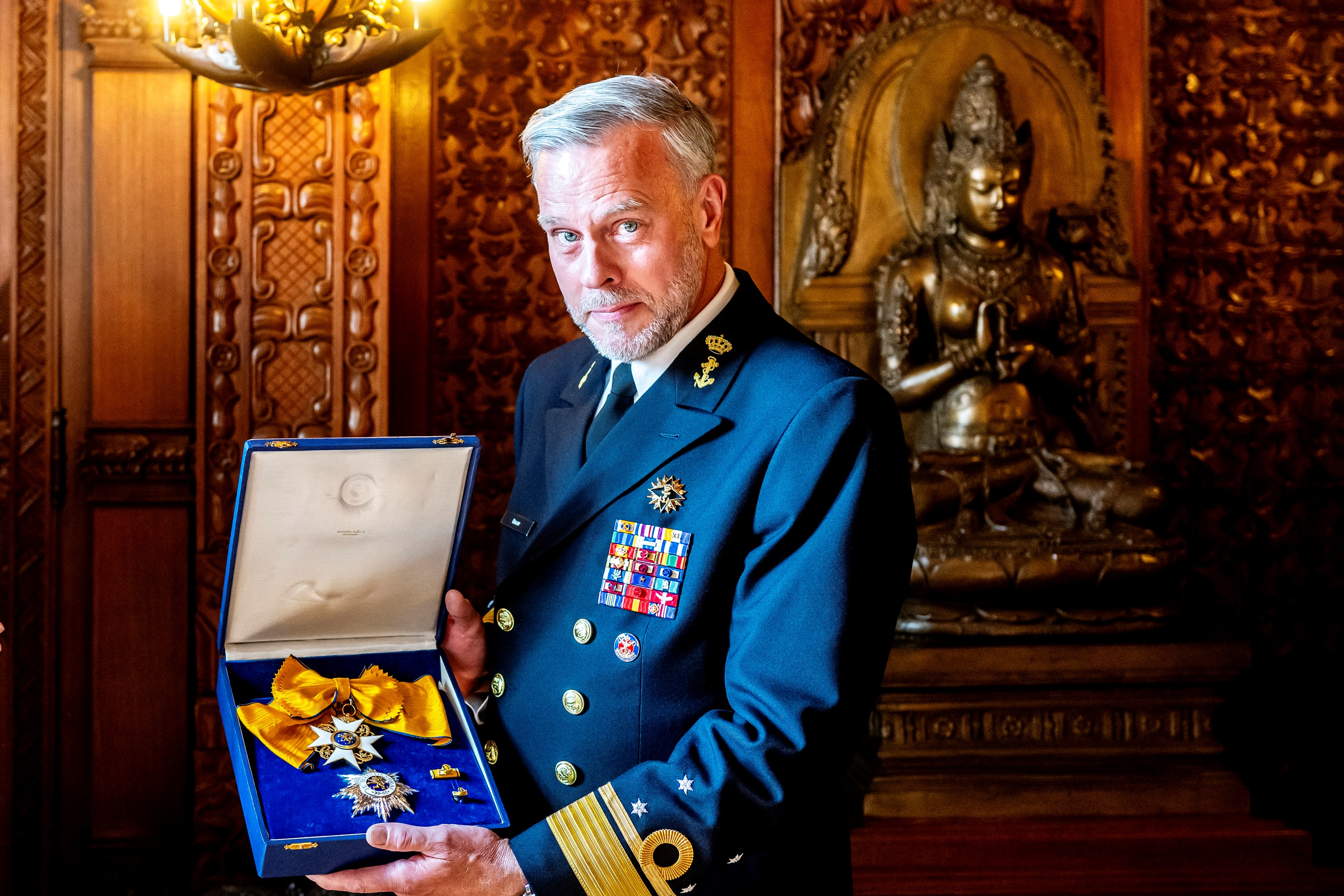
- Bauer in 2025
- Born: 11 November 1962 (age 63); Amsterdam, Netherlands
- Spouse: Maaike Bauer
- Children: 3
- Military career
- Allegiance: Netherlands
- Branch: Royal Netherlands Navy
- Service years: 1981–2025
- Rank: Admiral (Admiral)
- Commands: Chair of the NATO Military Committee; Chief of Defence; Vice Chief of Defence; Director of Plans for Operational Policy and Innovation; HNLMS Johan de Witt; HNLMS De Ruyter
- Conflicts: War on terror; Operation Enduring Freedom; Piracy in Somalia; Operation Active Endeavour
- Awards: Commander of the Order of Orange-Nassau

Robert Peter Bauer (born 11 November 1962) is a Dutch retired military officer of the Royal Netherlands Navy who served as Chair of the NATO Military Committee from 2021 to 2025, after succeeding Air Chief Marshal Stuart Peach. Bauer formerly served as the Chief of Defence (Dutch: Commandant der Strijdkrachten) from October 2017 to April 2021, and as the Vice Chief of Defence of the Netherlands of the from 1 September 2015 to 13 July 2017. Bauer was also involved in counter-terrorist and anti-piracy operations in the Mediterranean Sea, and in the Horn of Africa.

== Early life and education ==
Bauer entered the Royal Netherlands Navy through the Royal Naval College in 1981 until commissioned as a sub-lieutenant (Lieutenant ter Zee der 3de klasse) in 1984. He also completed the Advanced Strategic and General Studies Programme in 1998.

== Career ==
Throughout his career, Bauer was placed in shipborne missions and was eventually tasked in foreign assignments. Bauer commanded HNLMS De Ruyter, a De Zeven Provinciën-class air defense and command frigate from 2005 to 2007. During his term as commander of HNLMS De Ruyter, his deployments also included the operational deployment in the Mediterranean Sea with the Standing NATO Maritime Group 2 as part of the NATO Response Force, as part of Operation Active Endeavour, where he took park on Dutch operations during the war on terror. HNLMS De Ruyter was also deployed in Bahrain in 2006 where Bauer served as the Deputy Commander of Task Force 150 in the Operation Enduring Freedom in the Arabian Sea. He also took part in anti-piracy operations in the Horn of Africa during their deployment as part of Operation Atalanta, primarily focused on protecting sea lanes and bound for Somalia and neighboring waters. Bauer also commanded HNLMS Johan de Witt, a Rotterdam-class landing platform dock (LPD) amphibious warfare ship, from 2010 to 2011.

Bauer was promoted to commodore in 2011 and appointed as deputy director of Plans for Operational Policy and Innovation, focusing on the future defense fields of The Netherlands. In 2012, he was promoted to rear admiral and appointed as Director of Plans, which is in charge of overall defense and war-planning policies, as well as organizational structure measures being taken by the Dutch Armed Forces, which included the creation of the Defence Cyber Command, which is specialized in cyber warfare. He was also a member of the Council for Defence Research and Development, the National Council for Cyber Security and the Netherlands Coast Guard Council. Bauer also served as the Chairman of the Defence Business Platform and also became a board member of the National Committee for 4 and 5 May.

Bauer was appointed Vice Chief of Defence, and promoted to vice admiral, on 22 September 2015. In July 2017, he handed his position as the Vice Chief of Defence to Lieutenant General Martin Wijnen, in order to prepare for his posting as Chief of Defence. During his term as Vice Chief of Defence, Bauer initiated reforms towards the collaboration between the Dutch Armed Forces and the private sector. Bauer eventually became the Chief of Defence on 5 October 2017, after the resignation of Tom Middendorp and then-Minister of Defence Jeanine Hennis-Plasschaert in the aftermath of the death of two Dutch soldiers in a training accident in Mali. He was promoted to luitenant-admiraal (admiral) – the highest rank in the Royal Netherlands Navy, equivalent to a NATO OF-9 flag officer (i.e., four stars) – on October 5, 2017. As the overall commander of the Dutch Armed Forces, Bauer pushed for additional funding in the armed forces and initiated modernization efforts. Bauer also spearheaded transformations for organizational effectiveness, emphasized more modern strategic defense policies and strengthened the trust between all sectors in the armed forces.

=== Chair of the NATO Military Committee ===
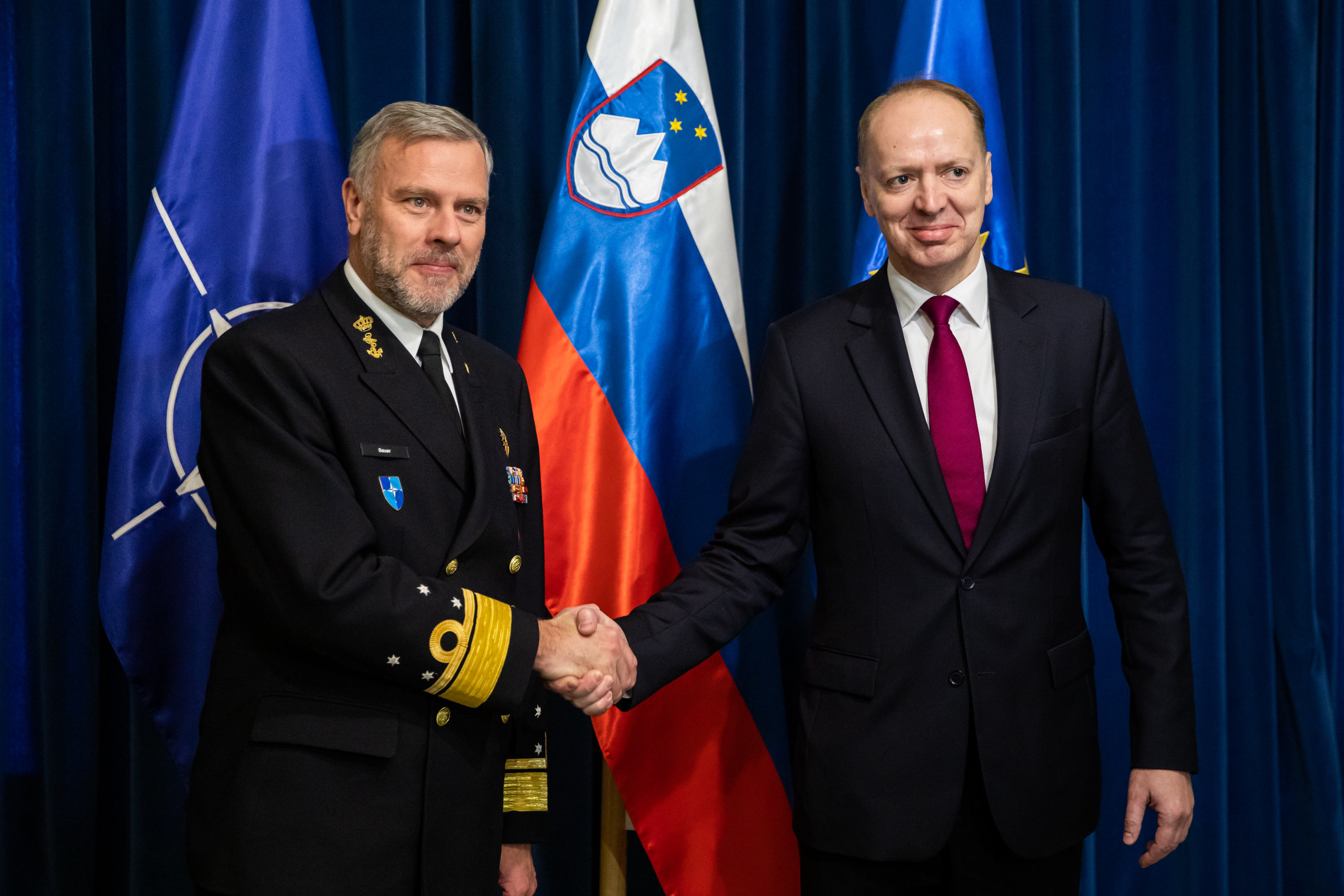
Chair of the NATO Military Committee Admiral Bauer meets with Slovenian State Secretary Andrej Benedejčič (2023)

On 9 October 2020, Bauer was elected by various Allied Chiefs of Defence from the NATO Military Committee as the new Chairman of the NATO Military Committee, the senior military adviser to the Secretary General of NATO. He took up the position replacing Air Chief Marshal Sir Stuart Peach, on 25 June 2021.

During the Russian invasion of Ukraine, Bauer initiated measures aimed at strengthening the alliance's defense measures in Eastern Europe, such as the Baltic States and former members of the Warsaw Pact through the expansion of the rapid reaction forces from 40,000 soldiers to as much as 300,000 soldiers, and the creation and deployment of four new battlegroups in Romania, Slovakia, Bulgaria, and the Czech Republic. Bauer also made efforts to hasten Finland's application to the alliance, while also assisting Sweden's accession, despite Turkey and Hungary's opposition. The measures were also aimed at strengthening NATO's deterrence policies which aims to prevent a potential spillover in the conflict. Bauer also emphasized that the Russian Army could "still pose a huge threat and must not be underestimated" due to the overall capabilities.

Bauer also spearheaded measures which allowed various members to donate weapons, ammunition, equipment, and supplies to Ukraine aimed in continuing their strong support to Ukraine throughout the conflict, which also resulted to a declining ammunition supply towards various NATO members and the challenges facing the alliance's overall weapons stockpiles. Bauer also called on fellow members to continue increasing their defense budgets in terms of allocating at least 2% of each country's GDP to defense preparations. In addition to the war in Ukraine, Bauer is also monitoring China's activity in the Taiwan Strait, as well as Russia's potential affairs in the Arctic and also tackled against rising Chinese influence in the Global Order. On 17 January 2025 Admiral Giuseppe Cavo Dragone took over the position as Chair of the NATO Military Committee.

== Retirement Life ==
After retiring as the Chair of the NATO Military Committee, Bauer currently serves as an Fellow at the Centre for the Edge of Deloitte, where his task focuses on boosting national and international cooperation between the public and private sectors while helping boost the Netherlands' defense and security.

== Honours ==
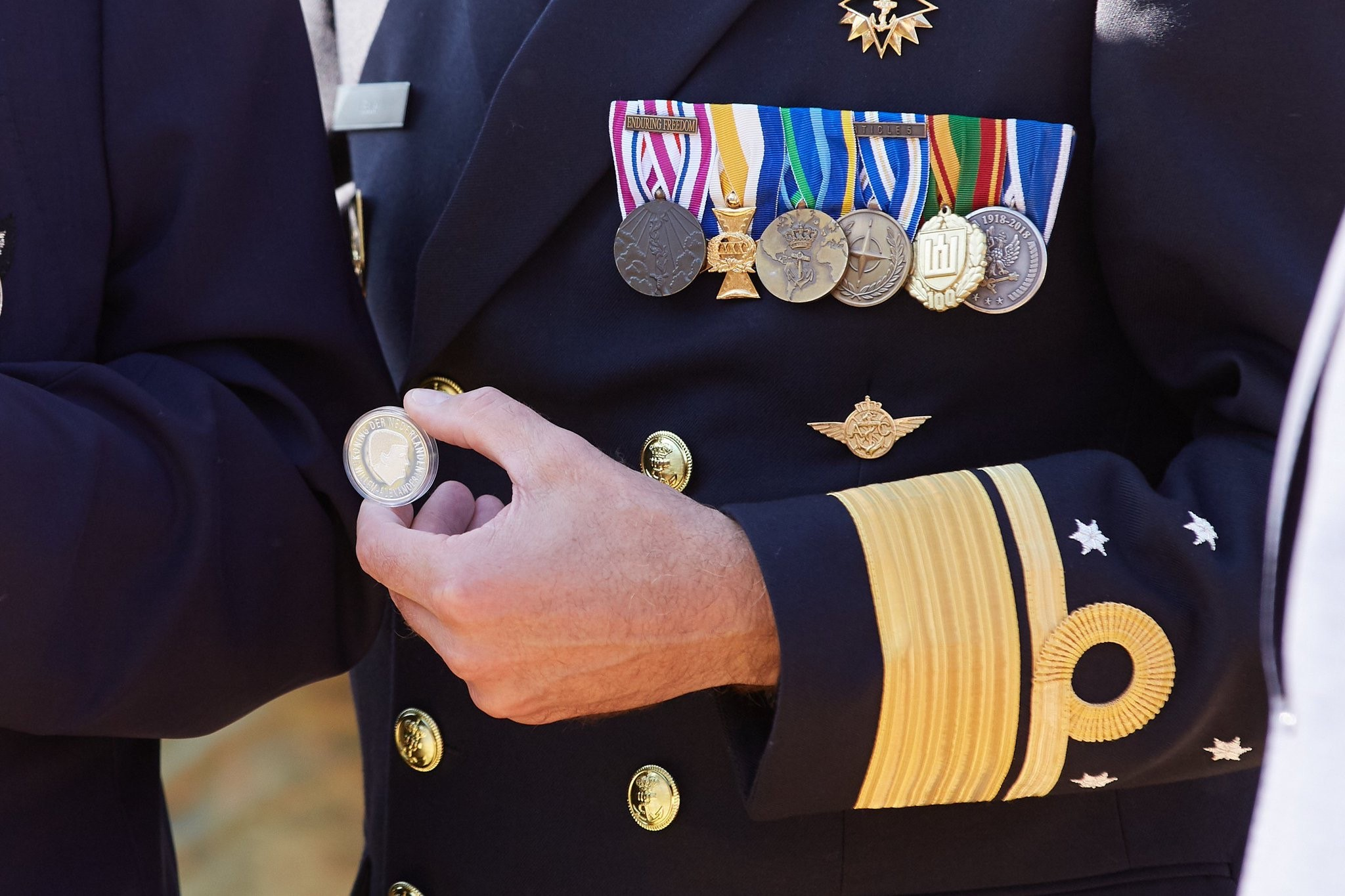
A closeup look at Bauer's medals and badges throughout his career (2019)

=== National honours ===
- Commander of the Order of Orange-Nassau
- Knight of the Order of the Gold Lion of the House of Nassau (awarded on 22 April 2025)
- Officer's Cross for long and faithful service
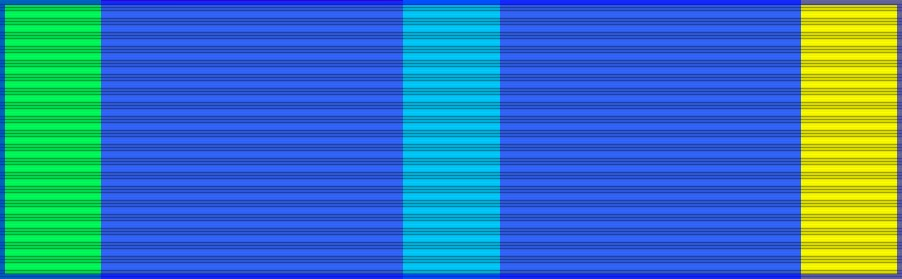
- Royal Netherlands Navy Service Medal
- Commemorative Medal for Peace Operations

=== Foreign honours ===
- NATO Medal (Operation Active Endeavour, Article 5)
- Grand Cross with White Decoration of the Cross of Naval Merit (Spain, 2022)
- Commander of the Order of Merit of the Grand Duchy of Luxembourg
- Officier of the Legion of Honour (France)
- Grand Officer of the Order of the Crown (Belgium)
- Grand Cross of the Order for Merits to Lithuania (Lithuania)
- Defence Service Medal with Laurel Branch (Norway)
- Armed Forces Medal "For Faith in the Cause" (Colombia, 21 May 2024)
- NATO Meritorious Service Medal (16 July 2024)
- Commander's Cross with Star of the Order of Merit of the Republic of Poland (15 August 2024)
- Interallied Confederation of Reserve Officers (CIOR) 75th Anniversary Medal (15 November 2023)
- Grand Cross, Order of the Lion of Finland (7 June 2025)
- 1st class with Swords, Order of Viesturs (Latvia) (24 June 2025)

=== Badges ===
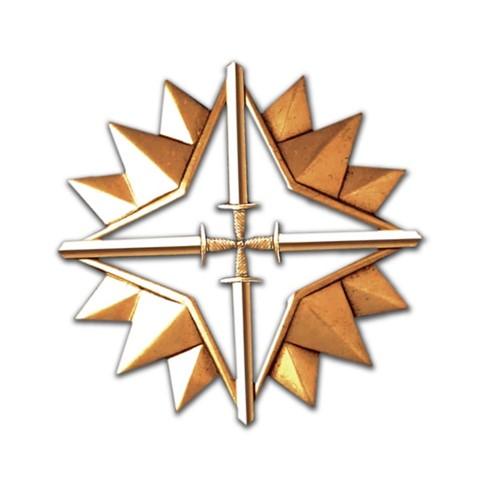
- Golden Sun of the Higher Defence Command Formation
- Maritime Air Controller Skill Badge
- NATO Chair of the Military Committee Badge

== Personal life ==
Bauer comes from a family of engineers. He is married to Maaike Bauer and they have three children.

Military offices
Preceded by Tom Middendorp	Chief of Defence; 2017–2021	Succeeded by Onno Eichelsheim
Preceded by Sir Stuart Peach	Chair of the NATO Military Committee; 2021–2025	Succeeded by Giuseppe Cavo Dragone
