= Clara Feyoena fan Raesfelt-van Sytzama =

Dutch poet (1729–1807)

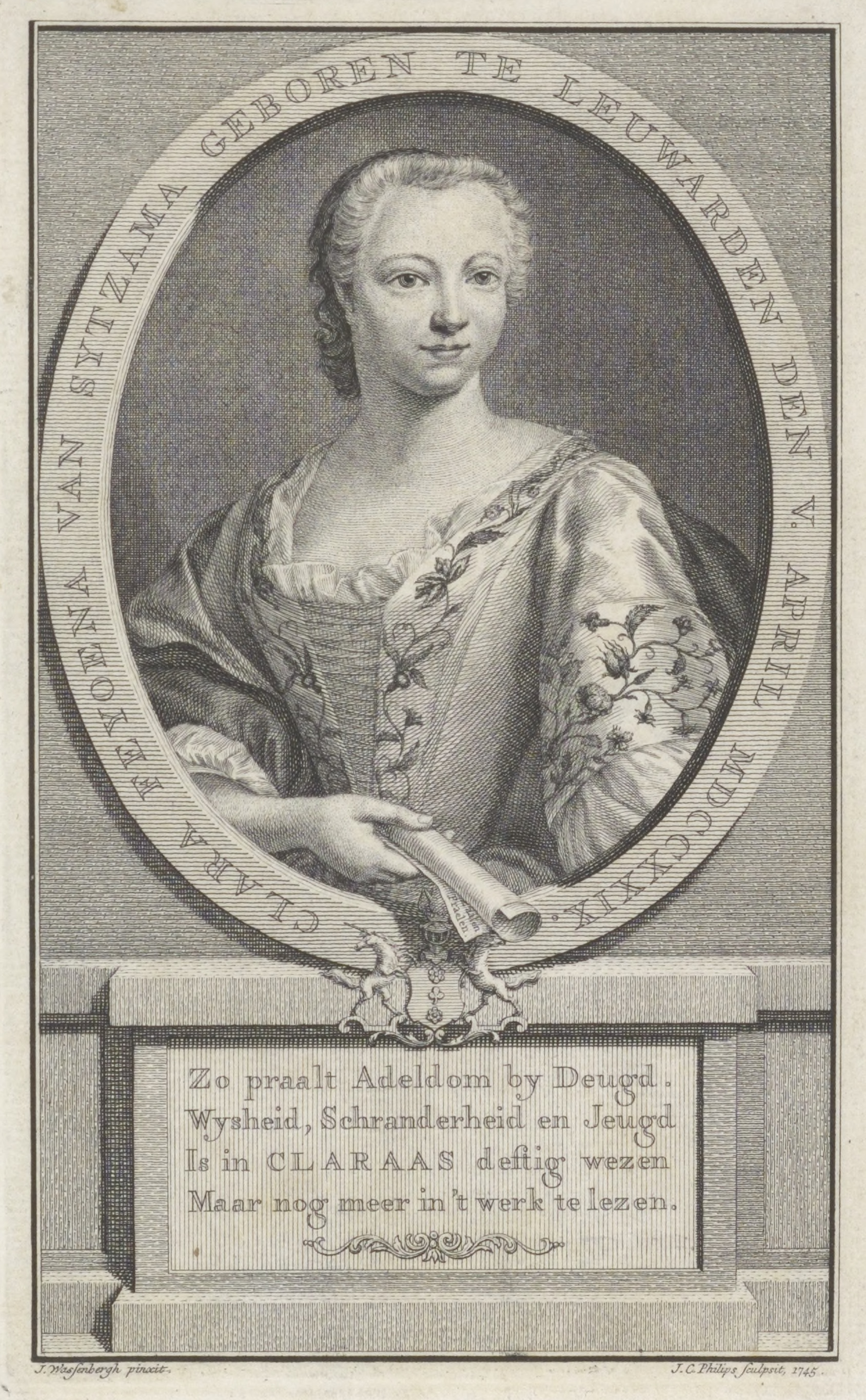

Clara Feyoena fan Raesfelt-van Sytzama (1729–1807) was born to Pier Willem van Sytzama and Ebella Juliana Aebinga van Humalda. Her father, Pier Willem van Sytzama, was the deputy to the States General and a member of the Dutch military. Clara Feyoena fan Raesfelt-van Sytzama was a poet, and often wrote hymns for Protestant worship, such as, 'We Kneel Before Your Seat.'

== Bibliography ==
1. djr. “Sytzama, Clara Feyoena van (1729-1807).” Knaw.nl, 2024, resources.huygens.knaw.nl/vrouwenlexicon/lemmata/data/RaesfeltVanSytzama. Accessed 25 Apr. 2025.
2. Bouwman, Willem. “Het Lied van de Ongelukkige Douairière van Raesfelt.” Www.nd.nl, Nederlands Dagblad, 23 July 2007, www.nd.nl/geloof/geloof/652960/het-lied-van-de-ongelukkige-douairiere-van-raesfelt. Accessed 25 Apr. 2025.
3. Blok, P.J, and P.C. Molhuysen. “Nieuw Nederlandsch Biografisch Woordenboek. Deel 5.” DBNL, 26 Apr. 2025, www.dbnl.org/tekst/molh003nieu05_01/molh003nieu05_01_1105.php. Accessed 25 Apr. 2025.
4. DBNL. “Clara Feyoena van Raesfelt van Sytzama.” DBNL, 2025, www.dbnl.org/auteurs/auteur.php?id=raes002. Accessed 25 Apr. 2025.
5. Mulder, Marten. “Sytzama, Clara Feyoena van - Stichting Dodenakkers.nl.” Dodenakkers.nl, 2020, www.dodenakkers.nl/artikelen-overzicht/beroemd/letteren/sytzama.html. Accessed 25 Apr. 2025.
6. Piet Couttenier, et al. “Met En Zonder Lauwerkrans. Schrijvende Vrouwen Uit de Vroegmoderne Tijd 1550-1850: Van Anna Bijns Tot Elise van Calcar.” DBNL, 25 Apr. 2025, www.dbnl.org/tekst/sche038mete01_01/sche038mete01_01_0113.php. Accessed 25 Apr. 2025.
