= Chief of Defence (Netherlands) =

Chief of defence of the Dutch military

- Commandant der Strijdkrachten (Dutch)
- Flag of the Chief of Defence

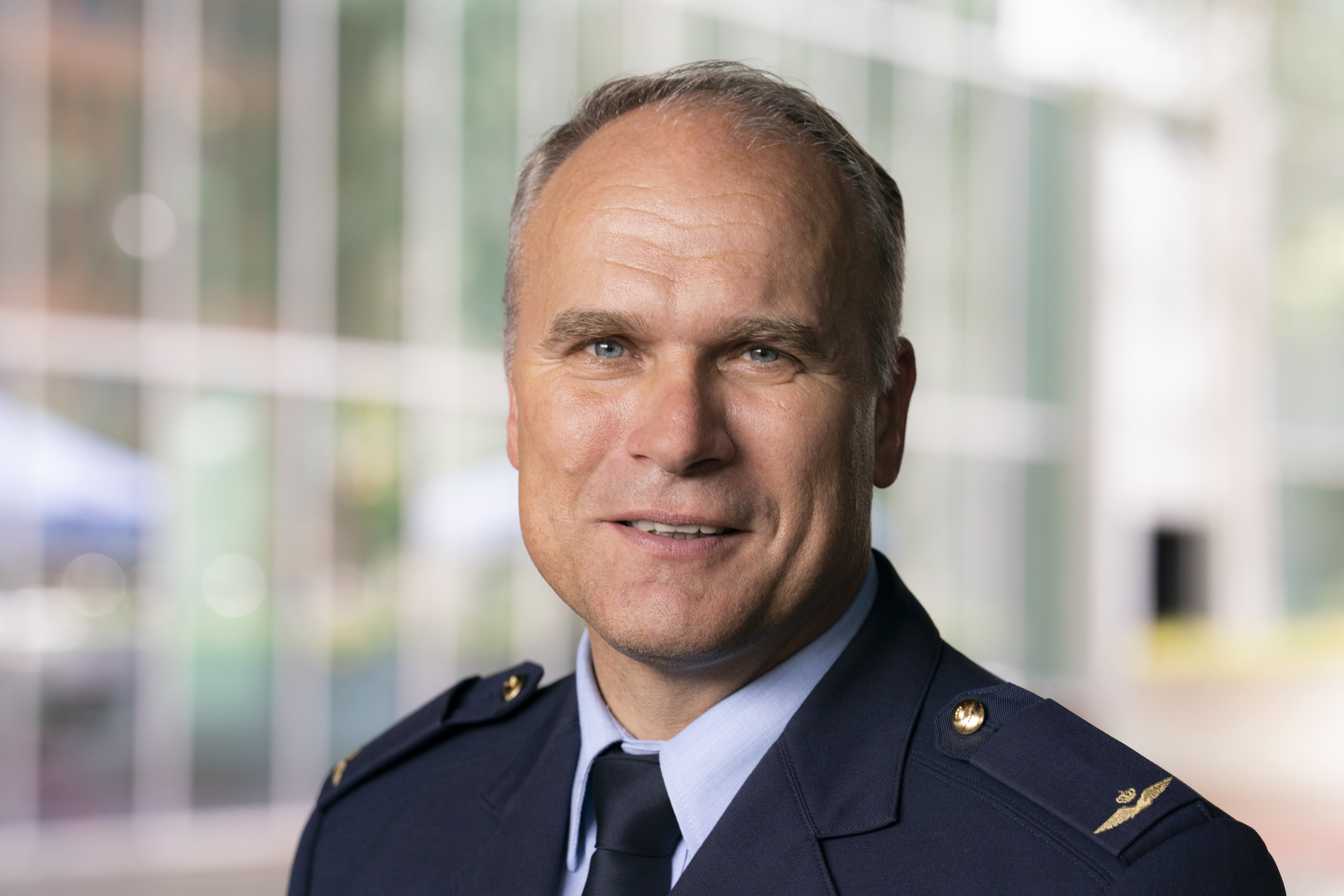
- Incumbent; General Onno Eichelsheim since 15 April 2021
- Armed forces of the Netherlands
- Style: His Excellency
- Abbreviation: CDS
- Member of: Central Staff
- Reports to: Minister of Defence
- Precursor: Chief of the Defence Staff
- Formation: 5 September 2005
- First holder: General Dick Berlijn
- Deputy: Vice Chief of Defence
- Website: Chief of Defence

The Chief of Defence (Dutch: Commandant der Strijdkrachten, CDS) is the highest-ranking officer in the Netherlands Armed Forces and is the principal military advisor to the minister of defence. On behalf of the minister of defence, he is responsible for operational policy, strategic planning and for preparing and executing military operations carried out by the armed forces. The chief of defence is in charge of the central staff and is the direct commanding officer of all the commanders of the branches of the armed forces. In this capacity, the chief of defence directs all the activities of the Royal Netherlands Army, the Royal Netherlands Navy and Royal Netherlands Air and Space Force. He is also in charge of the Royal Netherlands Marechaussee, when it is operating under the guise of the minister of defence.

== History ==
The current position of Chief of Defence (CHOD) was created on 5 September 2005, when it replaced the existing role of Chef-Defensiestaf (Chief of the Defence Staff) and was abbreviated as CDS. Just like its predecessor role the position of Chief of Defence will rotate between the branches of the military; the first Chief of Defence was General Dick Berlijn, of the Royal Netherlands Air Force. The position of Chief of Defence is subsequently held by a Four-star officer with the rank of General or Lieutenant Admiral

== Responsibilities ==
The main role of the chief of defence is as an intermediary between the Minister of Defence and the Central Staff of the Armed Forces of The Netherlands. He makes operational policy and is responsible to the minister for military-strategic planning, operations and deployment of the armed forces. The chief of defence is the direct commanding officer of the commanders of the branches of the Armed forces.

- The commander of the Royal Netherlands Army
- The commander of the Royal Netherlands Air and Space Force
- The commander of the Royal Netherlands Navy

The branch commanders are responsible for preparedness and actual deployment of their military personnel in the Netherlands and the rest of the world. Regarding operational planning and deployment, the branch commanders take their orders directly from the Chief of Defence.

The Royal Marechaussee (Gendarmerie) does not answer to the Chief of Defence directly, but rather to the secretary-general for the Ministry of Defence. The current secretary-general is Maarten Schurink.

== List of chiefs of the defence staff / chiefs of defence ==
=== Commander-in-chief of the Armed forces (1914–1949) ===
No.	Portrait	Commander-in-chief of the Armed forces	Took office	Left office	Time in office	Defence branch
1	Cornelis Snijders	General; Cornelis Snijders (1852–1939)	31 July 1914	9 November 1918	4 years, 101 days	Royal Netherlands Army / Royal Netherlands East Indies Army
2	Willem Frederik Pop	Lieutenant general Willem Frederik Pop (1852–1939)	9 November 1918	20 November 1919	1 year, 11 days	Royal Netherlands Army
Vacant; Interbellum
3	Izaak Reijnders	General; Izaak Reijnders (1879–1966)	28 August 1939	6 February 1940	162 days	Royal Netherlands Army
4	Henri Winkelman	General; Henri Winkelman (1876–1952)	6 February 1940	15 May 1940	99 days	Royal Netherlands Army
Vacant; German occupation
5	Prince Bernhard of Lippe-Biesterfeld	General; Prince Bernhard of Lippe-Biesterfeld (1911–2004)	3 September 1944	13 September 1945	1 year, 10 days	Royal Netherlands Army / Royal Netherlands East Indies Army / Royal Netherlands Navy
6	Hendrik Johan Kruls	General; Hendrik Johan Kruls (1902–1975)	13 September 1945	1 January 1949	3 years, 110 days	Royal Netherlands Army

=== Chairman of the United Defence Staff (1949–1976) ===
No.	Portrait	Chairman of the United Defence Staff	Took office	Left office	Time in office	Defence branch
1	Hendrik Johan Kruls	General; Hendrik Johan Kruls (1902–1975)	1 January 1949	5 January 1951	2 years, 4 days	Royal Netherlands Army
2	Edzard Jacob van Holthe	Vice admiral Edzard Jacob van Holthe (1896–1967)	5 January 1951	10 January 1953	2 years, 5 days	Royal Netherlands Navy
3	Fons Aler	Lieutenant general Fons Aler (1896–1981)	10 January 1953	1 October 1953	264 days	Royal Netherlands Air Force
4	Ben Hasselman	General; Ben Hasselman (1898–1984)	1 October 1953	1 November 1957	4 years, 31 days	Royal Netherlands Army
5	Heije Schaper	Lieutenant general Heije Schaper (1906–1996)	1 November 1957	10 May 1959	1 year, 190 days	Royal Netherlands Air Force
6	Henry Pröpper	Lieutenant admiral Henry Pröpper (1906–1995)	10 May 1959	10 May 1962	3 years, 0 days	Royal Netherlands Navy
7	Gillis le Fèvre de Montigny	General; Gillis le Fèvre de Montigny (1901–1982)	10 May 1962	5 May 1965	2 years, 360 days	Royal Netherlands Army
8	Hein Zielstra	General; Hein Zielstra (1908–1985)	5 May 1965	30 December 1968	3 years, 239 days	Royal Netherlands Air Force
9	Hugo van den Wall Bake	Lieutenant admiral Hugo van den Wall Bake (1913–1981)	5 January 1969	15 January 1972	3 years, 10 days	Royal Netherlands Navy
10	Willem van Rijn	Lieutenant general Willem van Rijn (1915–1997)	15 January 1972	1 November 1973	1 year, 290 days	Royal Netherlands Army
11	Robbie Wijting	General; Robbie Wijting (1925–1986)	1 November 1973	10 December 1976	3 years, 39 days	Royal Netherlands Air Force

=== Chiefs of the Defence Staff (1976–2005) ===
No.	Portrait	Chief of the Defence Staff	Took office	Left office	Time in office	Defence branch
1	Robbie Wijting	General; Robbie Wijting (1925–1986)	10 December 1976	1 November 1980	3 years, 327 days	Royal Netherlands Air Force
2	Cor de Jager	General; Cor de Jager (1925–2001)	1 November 1980	5 July 1983	2 years, 246 days	Royal Netherlands Army
3	Govert Huijser	General; Govert Huijser (1931–2014)	5 July 1983	10 December 1988	5 years, 158 days	Royal Netherlands Army
4	Peter Graaff	General; Peter Graaff (1936–2014)	10 December 1988	10 May 1992	3 years, 152 days	Royal Netherlands Army
5	Arie van der Vlis	General; Arie van der Vlis (1940–2020)	10 May 1992	15 August 1994	2 years, 97 days	Royal Netherlands Army
6	Henk van den Breemen	General; Henk van den Breemen (1941–2024)	15 August 1994	5 June 1998	3 years, 294 days	Royal Netherlands Marine Corps
7	Luuk Kroon	Lieutenant admiral Luuk Kroon (1942–2012)	5 June 1998	5 June 2004	6 years, 0 days	Royal Netherlands Navy
8	Dick Berlijn	General; Dick Berlijn (born 1950)	5 June 2004	5 September 2005	1 year, 92 days	Royal Netherlands Air Force

=== Chiefs of the Defence (2005–present) ===
No.	Portrait	Chief of the Defence	Took office	Left office	Time in office	Defence branch
1	Dick Berlijn	General; Dick Berlijn (born 1950)	5 September 2005	17 April 2008	2 years, 225 days	Royal Netherlands Air Force
2	Peter van Uhm	General; Peter van Uhm (born 1955)	17 April 2008	28 June 2012	4 years, 72 days	Royal Netherlands Army
3	Tom Middendorp	General; Tom Middendorp (born 1960)	28 June 2012	3 October 2017	5 years, 97 days	Royal Netherlands Army
4	Rob Bauer	Admiral; Rob Bauer (born 1962)	5 October 2017	15 April 2021	3 years, 192 days	Royal Netherlands Navy
5	Onno Eichelsheim	General; Onno Eichelsheim (born 1966)	15 April 2021	Incumbent	5 years, 145 days	Royal Netherlands Air and Space Force

== List of vice chiefs of defence ==
Vice Chiefs of Defence		Military branch	Term of office
	Lieutenant general Hans Sonneveld	Royal Netherlands Army	5 September 2005 – 1 December 2006 (1 year, 87 days)
	Lieutenant general Rob Bertholee (Born 1955)	Royal Netherlands Army	1 December 2006 – 3 March 2008 (1 year, 93 days)
	Lieutenant general Freek Meulman	Royal Netherlands Air Force	3 March 2008 – 3 March 2012 (2 years, 0 days)
	Vice admiral Wim Nagtegaal	Royal Netherlands Navy	3 March 2010 – 14 May 2012 (2 years, 72 days)
	Lieutenant general Hans Wehren	Royal Netherlands Air Force	14 May 2012 – 1 September 2015 (3 years, 110 days)
Rob Bauer	Vice admiral Rob Bauer (born 1962)	Royal Netherlands Navy	1 September 2015 – 13 July 2017 (1 year, 315 days)
	Lieutenant general Martin Wijnen (Born 1966)	Royal Netherlands Army	13 July 2017 – 1 July 2019 (1 year, 353 days)
	Lieutenant general Onno Eichelsheim (Born 1966)	Royal Netherlands Air Force	1 July 2019 - 8 March 2021 (1 year, 250 days)
Boudewijn Boots	Vice admiral Boudewijn Boots (born 1964)	Royal Netherlands Navy	8 March 2021 - (5 years, 183 days)
Ludy Schmidt	Lieutenant general Ludy Schmidt	Royal Netherlands Army	27 October 2024 - (1 year, 315 days)
