= Peter Graaff =

Dutch military officer (1936–2014)

General Peter Graaff
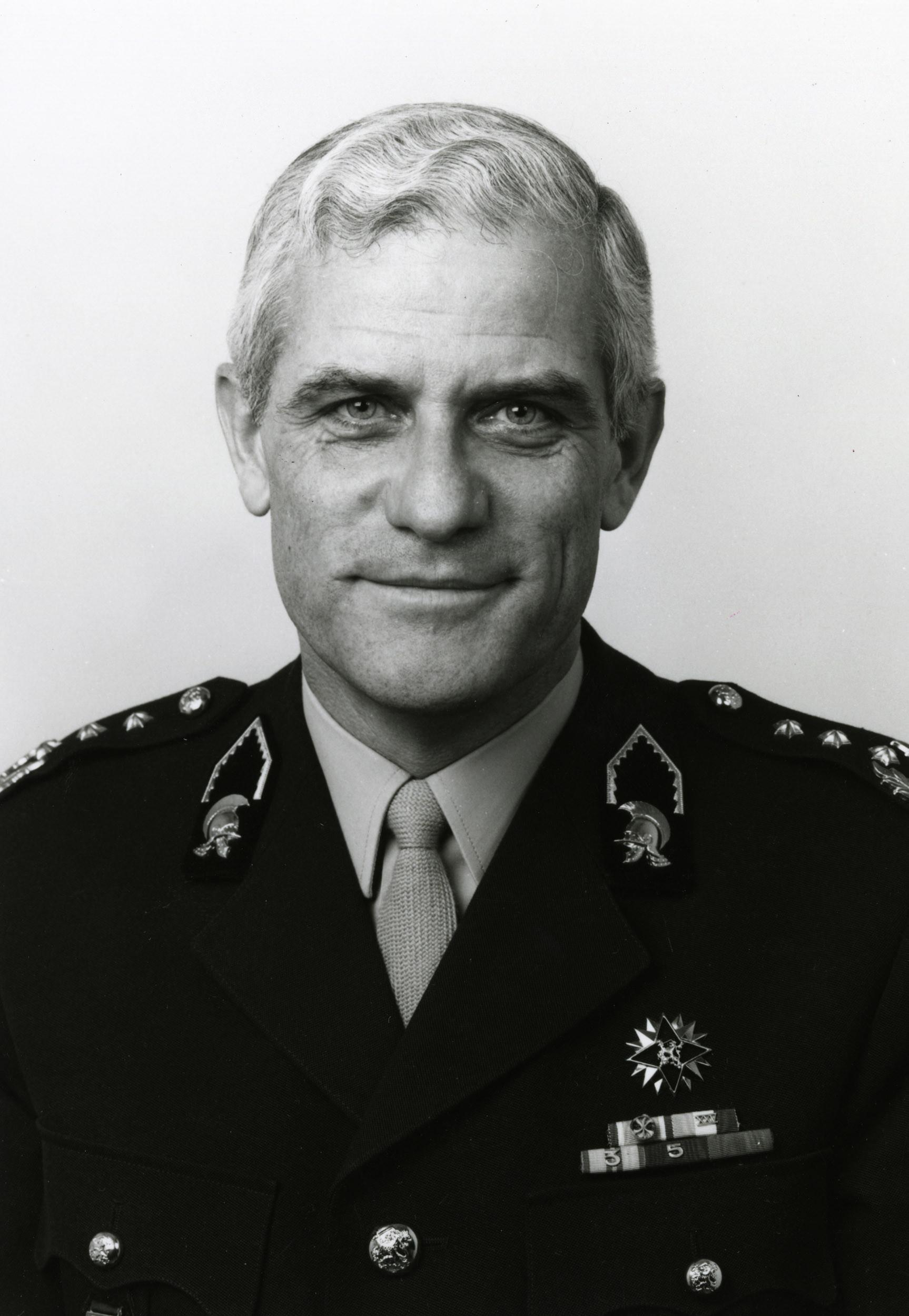

Chiefs of the Defence Staff
- In office 10 December 1988 – 10 May 1992
- Preceded by: General Govert Huijser
- Succeeded by: General Arie van der Vlis

Commander of the Royal Netherlands Army
- In office 31 oktober 1985 – 10 December 1988
- Preceded by: Lieutenant general Han Roos
- Succeeded by: Lieutenant general Rien Wilmink

Personal details
- Born: Peter Jan Graaff; 21 January 1936 Bandung, Indonesia
- Died: 24 April 2014 (aged 78) Emmen, Netherlands

Military service
- Allegiance: Netherlands
- Branch/service: Royal Netherlands Army
- Years of service: 1955-1992
- Rank: General

General Peter Graaff (21 January 1936 – 24 March 2014) was a Dutch military officer who served as Chief of the Defence Staff between 1988 and 1992.
