= Netherlands Armed Forces =

Combined military forces of the Netherlands

- Nederlandse krijgsmacht
- Logos of the Netherlands Armed Forces
- Founded: 1572; 454 years ago
- Service branches: Royal Netherlands Navy; Royal Netherlands Army; Royal Netherlands Air and Space Force; Royal Netherlands Marechaussee
- Headquarters: Ministry of Defence, The Hague
- Website: defensie.nl

Leadership
- Supreme Command: The Government
- Minister of Defence: Dilan Yeşilgöz
- State Secretary of Defence: Derk Boswijk
- Chief of Defence: General Onno Eichelsheim

Personnel
- Military age: 17
- Conscription: Inactive since 1996
- Active personnel: 44,245 (1 September 2025)
- Reserve personnel: 8,510 (1 September 2025)

Expenditure
- Budget: €26.9 billion (2026)
- Percent of GDP: 2.2% (2026)

Industry
- Domestic suppliers: Damen Group; Thales Nederland; Defenture
- Foreign suppliers: Lockheed Martin; Rheinmetall; KNDS Deutschland; BAE Systems Hägglunds

Related articles
- History: Military history of the Netherlands
- Ranks: Military ranks of the Netherlands

The Netherlands Armed Forces (Dutch: Nederlandse krijgsmacht) are the military forces of the Kingdom of the Netherlands (mainland Netherlands in Europe and islands of the Dutch Caribbean). The armed forces consist of four service branches: the Royal Netherlands Navy (Koninklijke Marine), the Royal Netherlands Army (Koninklijke Landmacht), the Royal Netherlands Air and Space Force (Koninklijke Luchtmacht) and the Royal Netherlands Marechaussee (Koninklijke Marechaussee). The service branches are supplemented by various joint support organizations. In addition, local conscript forces exist on the Dutch Caribbean islands of Aruba and Curaçao. These operate under the auspices of the Royal Netherlands Navy and the Netherlands Marine Corps. The armed forces are part of the Ministry of Defence.

Supreme command of the armed forces is determined in Article 97 of the constitution, which states "The Government shall have supreme authority over the armed forces". Service members swear allegiance to the King in his role as head of state.

The military ranks of the Netherlands armed forces are similar to those of fellow NATO member states and were established by Royal Decree. The highest-ranking officer in the Dutch military is the Chief of Defence, who is a four-star officer (NATO OF-9).

After initial cooperation with the German army in 1995 through a Münster-located corps and increasing cross-linking during the following decades, all three Royal Netherlands Army combat brigades have fully integrated into German divisions as of March 2023.

In 2024 the Netherlands Armed Forces was awarded the Wateler Peace Prize.

== Foundation in law and purpose ==
The Netherlands armed forces exist by declaration in the constitution of the Netherlands. Article 97 of the constitution determines that the armed forces exist

- To defend the Kingdom of the Netherlands and its interests in the world; and
- To protect and advance the international rule of law.

This means that the role and responsibility of the Dutch military in international stability and peacekeeping is constitutionally determined.

The same article of the constitution determines that supreme command of the Dutch military resides with the Government of the Netherlands. This has been the case since the constitution was changed in 1983; before then, supreme command of the armed forces of the Netherlands was held by the Monarch.

== Overview ==
=== Organization ===
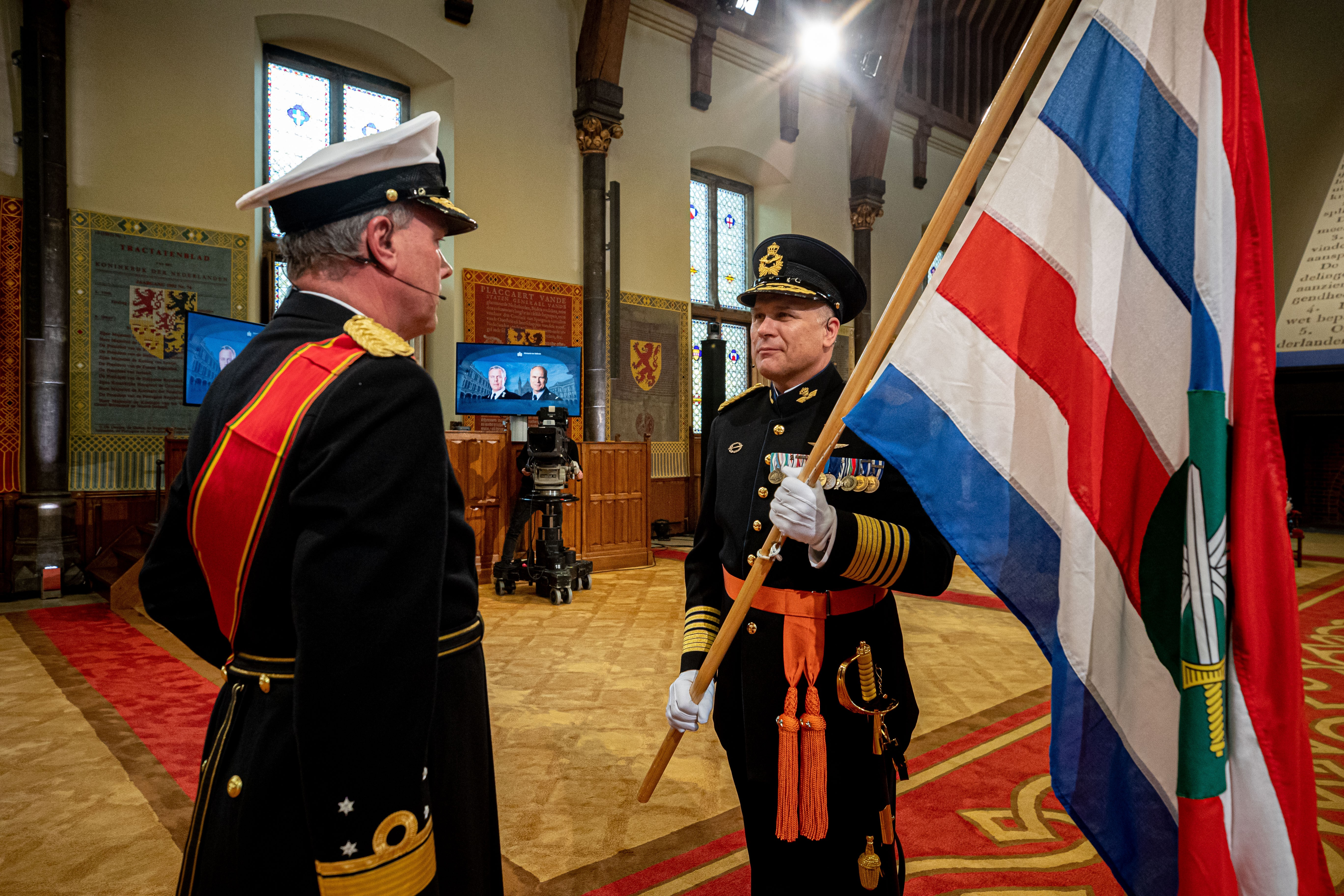
Chief of Defence general Onno Eichelsheim during the acceptance ceremony of the command over the Netherlands Armed Forces, April 2021.

The existence of, authority over, and tasks of the armed forces are determined in the constitution of the Netherlands. The Government, which consists of cabinet members led by the Prime Minister and the King, functions as the head of the armed forces. Although service members swear allegiance to the King of the Netherlands, the monarch does not hold the position of commander-in-chief. Therefore, in practice, important decisions are made by Cabinet, while the Minister of Defence assumes political responsibility over the Ministry.

The Ministry of Defence is the government ministry which is responsible for formulating and executing defence policy. The ministry consists of the Minister, State Secretary, the Central Staff, the Netherlands Armed Forces and two independent support organizations. The Central Staff (Bestuursstaf) of the Ministry comprises several directorates responsible for executing policy, advising the Minister and State Secretary, and controlling the Defence organization. The Central Staff is led by the highest civil servant of the defence organization, the Secretary General. Moreover, the Central Staff incorporates the Defence Staff, which is the highest military organ under command of the Chief of Defence. The Chief of Defence is the military leader of the Netherlands Armed Forces and the most senior military adviser to the Minister of Defence. The Chief of Defence has command over the Armed Forces, the Netherlands Special Operations Command (NLD SOCOM) and the Defence Cyber Command. Several special executive organizations, including the Military Intelligence and Security Service and the office of the Inspector General, are incorporated into the Central Staff as well.

=== Personnel ===
The Netherlands Armed Forces are a professional military, conscription in the Netherlands having been suspended in 1996 with the exception of Aruba and Curaçao. All military branches are open to female recruits. In 2018 the Ministry of Defence announced that the submarine service will begin accepting female recruits for positions as officer, NCO and sailor.

The Dutch Ministry of Defence employs over 70,000 personnel, including both civilian and military personnel. The distribution of personnel in the Defence organization, including the Armed Forces, on 1 September 2025 was as follows:

Service	Military	Reserve	Civilian	Total
Navy	7324	1826	3226	12,411
Army	17806	4873	3,927	26,606
Air and Space Force	7051	1067	1349	9,467
Marechaussee	7405	484	986	8,874
Central Staff	1,336	32	3116	4,484
Defence Support Command	2,602	179	8023	10,804
Materiel and IT Command	721	14	5941	6,776
Total	44,245	8,510	26,568	79,323

In March 2025 it was announced that the Dutch government wants to increase the size of the Netherlands Armed Forces from 70,000 to 200,000 personnel.

=== Ranks ===
The Dutch military is part of the NATO militaries and therefore conforms to the structure of a NATO military. It also uses conforming rank structures.

=== Oath ===
All Dutch military personnel, officers and enlisted personnel, are required to take an oath of allegiance. This oath is recorded in the law on General Military Personnel Regulations (Algemeen Militair Ambtenarenregelement) in Article 126a and states the following:

"Ik zweer (beloof) trouw aan de Koning, gehoorzaamheid aan de wetten en onderwerping aan de krijgstucht. Zo waarlijk helpe mij God Almachtig (Dat beloof ik)."

Translated in English:

"I swear (pledge) loyalty to the King, obedience to the law and submission to martial discipline. So help me God (That, I pledge)."

=== Unionized military ===
Unlike many military organizations, Dutch military members are allowed to form and join unions.

There is a wide variety of unions, including unions exclusive to officers or particular service branches. Some of the larger unions include:

- Algemene Federatie van Militair Personeel (AFMP, General Federation of Military Personnel), which was recognized by the Dutch government in 1966. The AFMP is a member of the Federation of Dutch Trade Unions (FNV).
- Algemeen Christelijke Organisatie van Militairen (ACOM, General Christian Organization for Military Personnel). The ACOM is a member of the Christian National Trade Union Federation (CNV).
- Gezamenlijke Officieren Verenigingen en Middelbaar en Hoger Burgerpersoneel bij Defensie (GOV/MHB, United Officers Associations and Middle- and Senior level Civilian Personnel)
- Vakbond voor Defensiepersoneel VBM (VBM, Union for Defence Personnel).

== Service branches ==
=== Royal Netherlands Navy ===
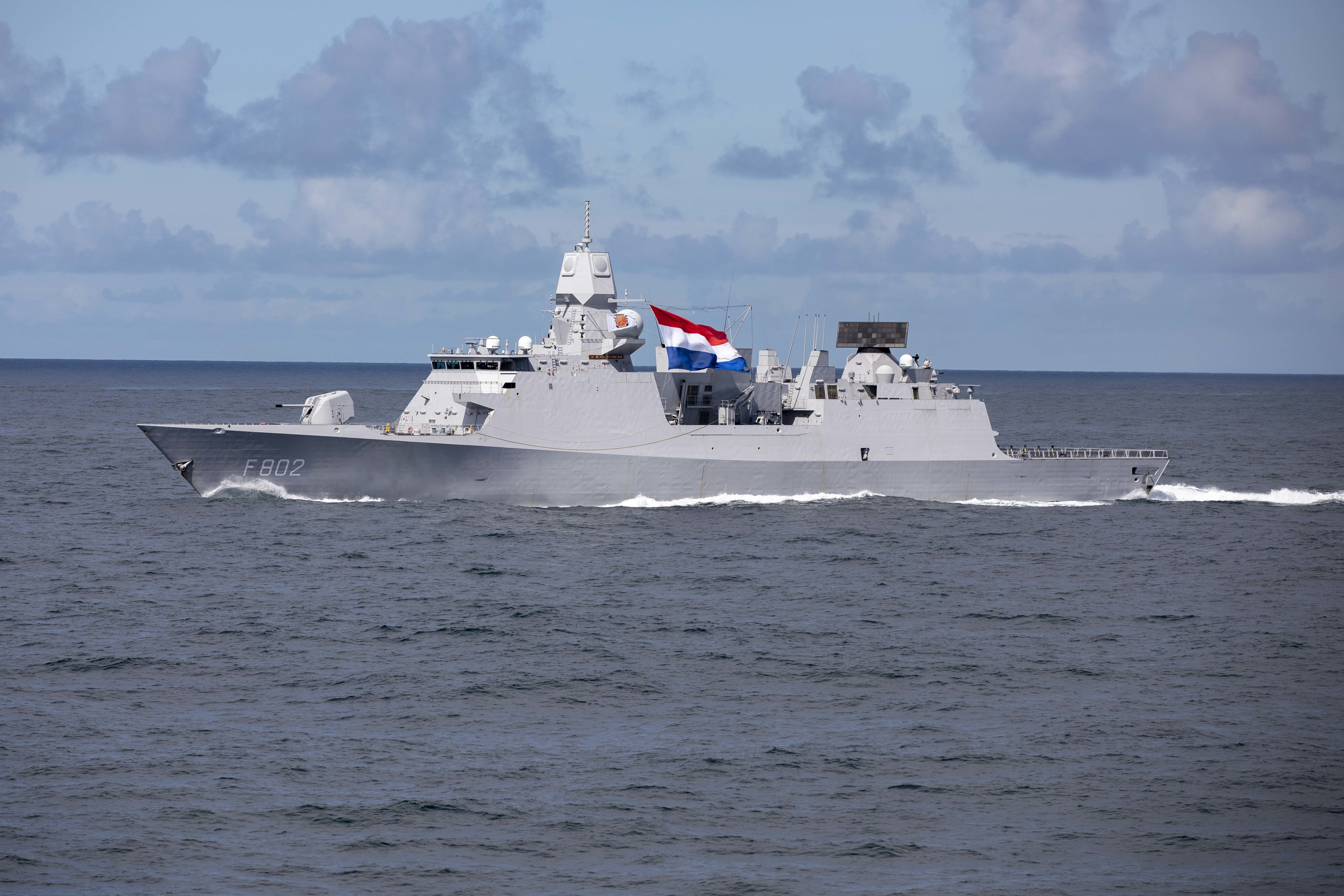
HNLMS De Zeven Provinciën during exercise At-Sea Demo/Formidable Shield 2021 on the Atlantic Ocean.

The Royal Netherlands Navy (Dutch: Koninklijke Marine) is the Netherlands Armed Forces' maritime force which consists of 24 commissioned ships and an additional number of support ships of various types. The Navy is commanded by the Commander of the Royal Netherlands Navy (Dutch: Commandant Zeestrijdkrachten), an officer in the rank of Vice Admiral or Lieutenant General of the Marines, who reports directly to the Chief of Defence. In addition to being the commanding officer of the Royal Netherlands Navy, the Commandant Zeestrijdkrachten holds the position of Admiral Benelux. As such, the Commandant Zeestrijdkrachten is the commanding officer of the operational units of the Royal Netherlands Navy and the Belgian Naval Component.

The surface fleet of the Navy consist of frigates, amphibious warfare ships, patrol vessels, mine-countermeasure vessels and multiple auxiliary ships. All major surface vessels of the Royal Netherlands Navy are constructed at the Dutch shipyard Damen Schelde Naval Shipbuilding. This includes the technologically advanced air-defence frigates of the De Zeven Provinciën-class. Thales Nederland produces various types of high-end sensors and radars for the Dutch fleet.

The Royal Netherlands Navy Submarine Service (Dutch: Onderzeedienst) was established in 1906 and is responsible for the operation of all Dutch submarines. As of 2021, the Onderzeedienst operates four Walrus-class submarines and one submarine tender, HNLMS Mercuur. The Dutch submarines fulfill a considerable role within NATO as their small size and expeditionary capacities allow them to operate in waters that are off-limits to larger submarines. The Ministry of Defence initiated a replacement program in November 2014. in March 2024 the winning bid was announced with the newer class being called Orka-class and are planned to enter service in the late 2030s.The Netherlands Select Naval Group for its New Submarines

==== Netherlands Marine Corps ====
The Netherlands Marine Corps is the Navy's naval infantry corps. The Corps consist of two battalion-sized Marine Combat Groups, various support units and the Netherlands Maritime Special Operations Forces. The Marines are specialized in amphibious, arctic and mountain warfare as well as special operations. The Corps operates a fleet of landing craft that can operate from one of the two Navy's amphibious transport docks.

On 7 July 2026, on the sidelines of the NATO summit in Ankara, UK Prime Minister Keir Starmer and Dutch Prime Minister Rob Jetten signed a £2.4 billion (US$3.2 billion) maritime partnership agreement to strengthen bilateral naval cooperation and support the joint procurement of new amphibious transport ships. The deal equips British and Dutch forces with eight advanced amphibious transport ships (four for each nation) to strengthen allied.

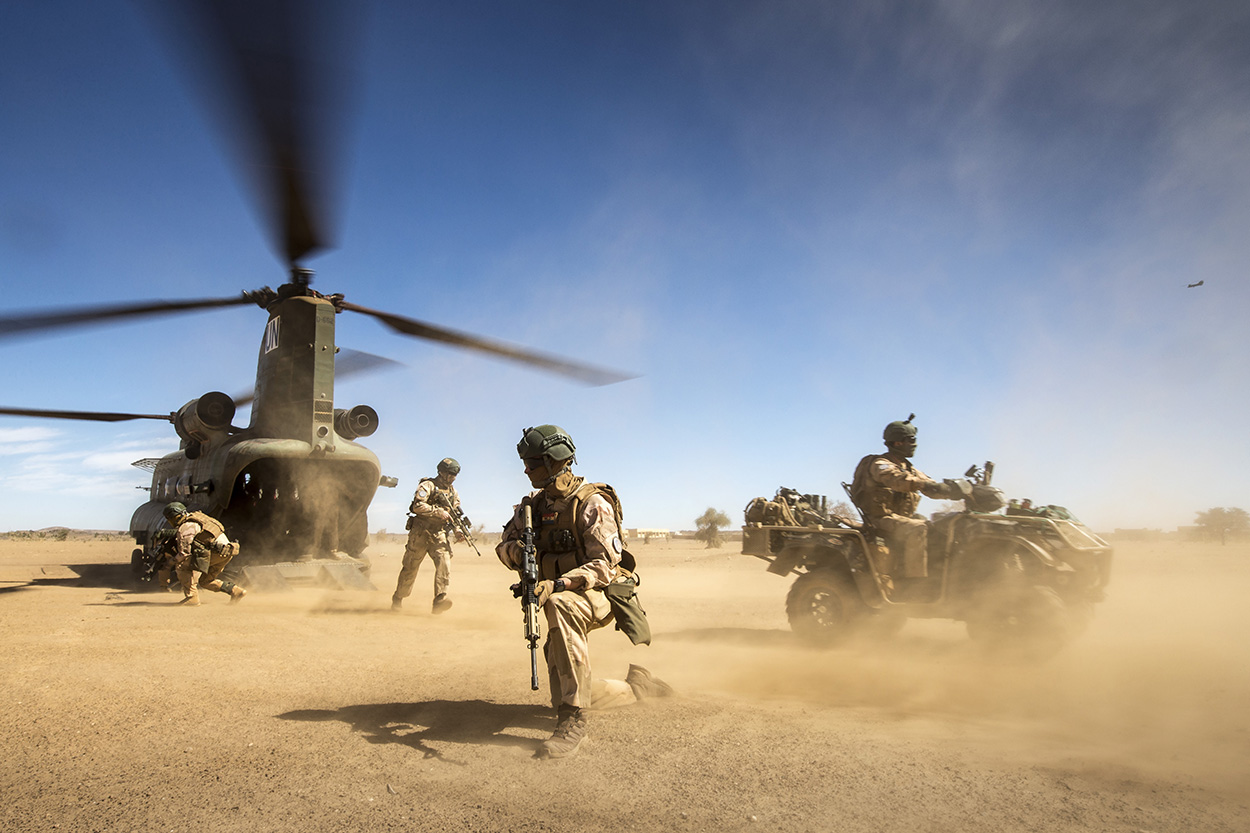
Troops of 11 Air Assault Brigade disembarking a CH-47D Chinook in Mali.

=== Royal Netherlands Army ===
The Royal Netherlands Army (Dutch: Koninklijke Landmacht) consists of regular Army personnel and the National Reserve Corps. The Army is headed by the Commander of the Royal Netherlands Army (Dutch: Commandant Landstrijdkrachten), its headquarters are located on the Kromhoutkazerne in Utrecht. The core fighting element of the Army consist of three combat brigades: 11 Airmobile Brigade, 13 Light Brigade and 43 Mechanized Brigade. The brigade-sized Operational Support Command Land fields a variety of combat support and combat service support units while the Army's special operations forces are part of the Korps Commandotroepen. The Army's infantry regiments fulfil several distinct roles, these include air assault, armoured infantry, light infantry and special operations. Furthermore, the Army fields cavalry, artillery, engineering and medical regiments.

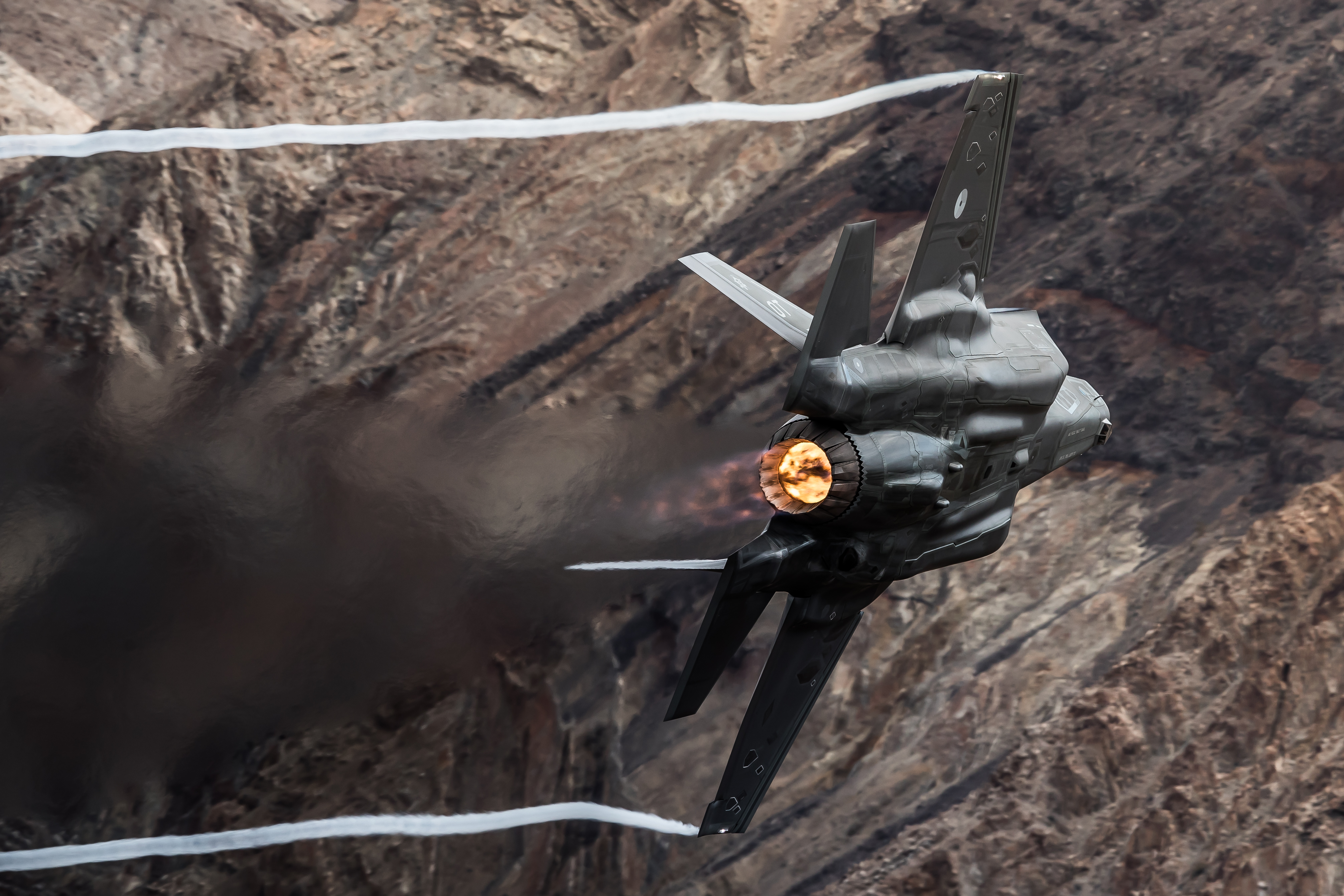
RNLASF F-35A Lightning II during cannon trials in October 2018.

=== Royal Netherlands Air and Space Force ===
The Royal Netherlands Air and Space Force (Dutch: Koninklijke Luchtmacht) is the military aviation and space warfare branch of the Netherlands Armed Forces and is led by the Commander of the Royal Netherlands Air and Space Force (Commandant Lucht-en Ruimtestrijdkrachten). The Air and Space Force operates a diverse fleet of fixed-wing and rotary aircraft, in addition to operating and maintaining multiple airbases. Moreover, Air and Space Force personnel contributes to the Joint Ground-based Air Defence Command by operating various air-defence systems while other units are dedicated to force protection. The Air and Space Force operates modern fighter aircraft, such as the F-16 Fighting Falcon and F-35 Lightning II, tankers, transports, helicopters, unmanned aerial vehicles, and various types of training aircraft. Until 2025, the Royal Netherlands Air and Space Force was called the Royal Netherlands Air Force.

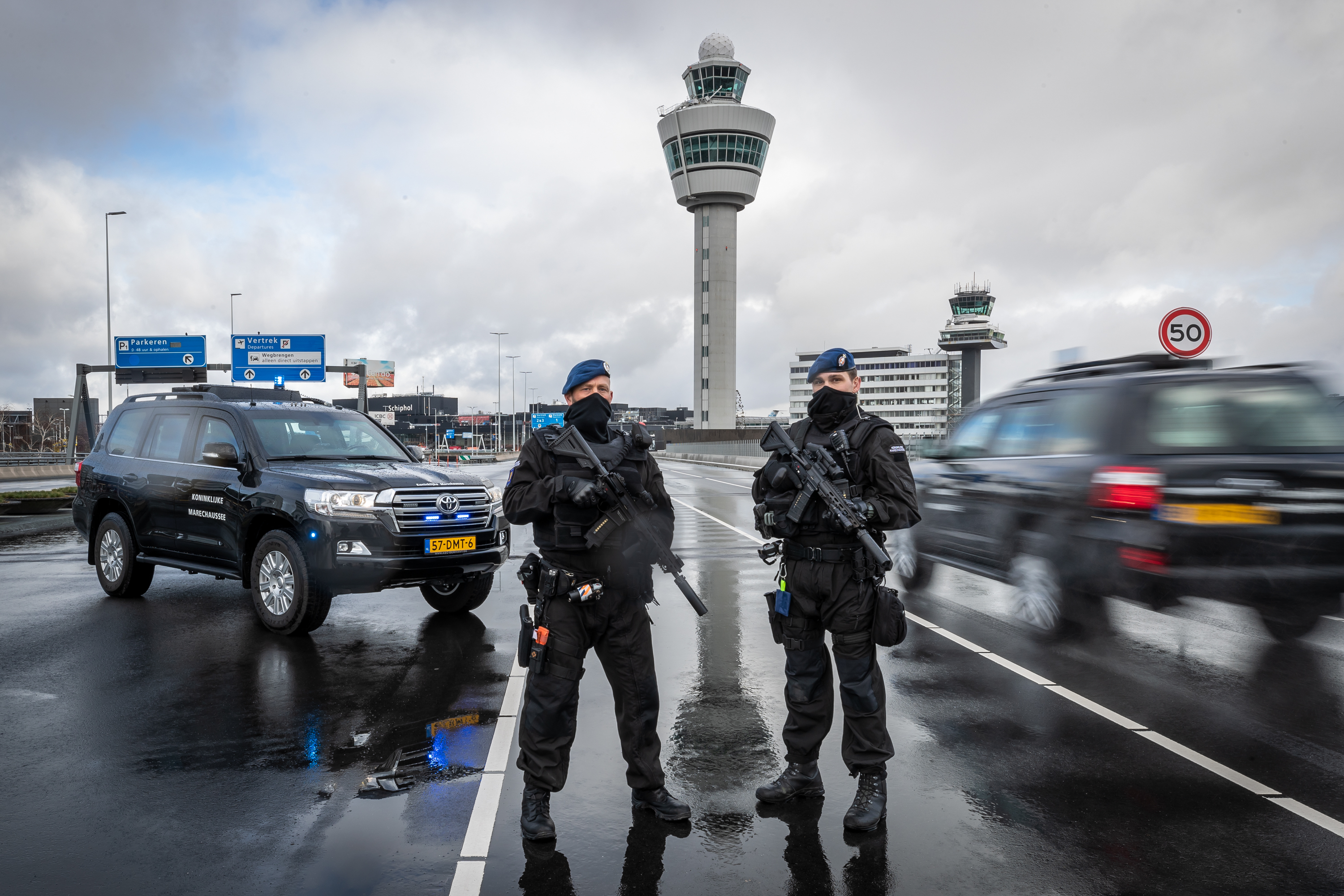
Marechaussee providing security at Amsterdam Airport Schiphol with armoured Toyota Land Cruiser.

=== Royal Netherlands Marechaussee ===
The Royal Netherlands Marechaussee (Dutch: Koninklijke Marechaussee) is a gendarmerie force which performs both military and civilian police duties. In addition to the military police duties, the Marechaussee has a wide variety of duties and responsibilities. This includes guarding the national borders and airports, fighting illegal immigration and transnational crime and guarding the royal palaces.

The Marechaussee was established as one of the separate Armed Forces in 1998; before then the Marechaussee was organized as one of the arms within the Army. While the Royal Netherlands Marechaussee operates under the jurisdiction of the Ministry of Defence, the branch often performs duties delegated by the Ministry of Justice and Security and the Ministry of the Interior and Kingdom Relations. Moreover, several brigades of the Marechaussee are permanently stationed in the Dutch Caribbean.

== Contemporary campaigns ==
Since the 1990s, the Dutch military has been involved in several military campaigns and peace-keeping missions, these include:

- Bosnian War
- Kosovo War
- International Security Assistance Force in Afghanistan leading the effort in Uruzgan Province.
- Multinational force in Iraq
- United Nations Multidimensional Integrated Stabilization Mission in Mali
- Combined Joint Task Force
- Resolute Support Mission

=== Afghanistan ===
==== Contribution to ISAF ====
As part of Operation Enduring Freedom, the Netherlands deployed aircraft which were integrated in the European Participating Air Force (EPAF) in support of ground operations in Afghanistan. Additionally, Dutch naval frigates were tasked with policing the waters of the Middle East and Indian Ocean. Between 2001 and 2003, a reinforced army company was deployed to Afghanistan to provide support in maintaining public order and providing security in and around the capital Kabul. Furthermore, military assistance was provided to the Afghan National Army and local security forces. The troops were deployed under the command of NATO's International Security Assistance Force mission.

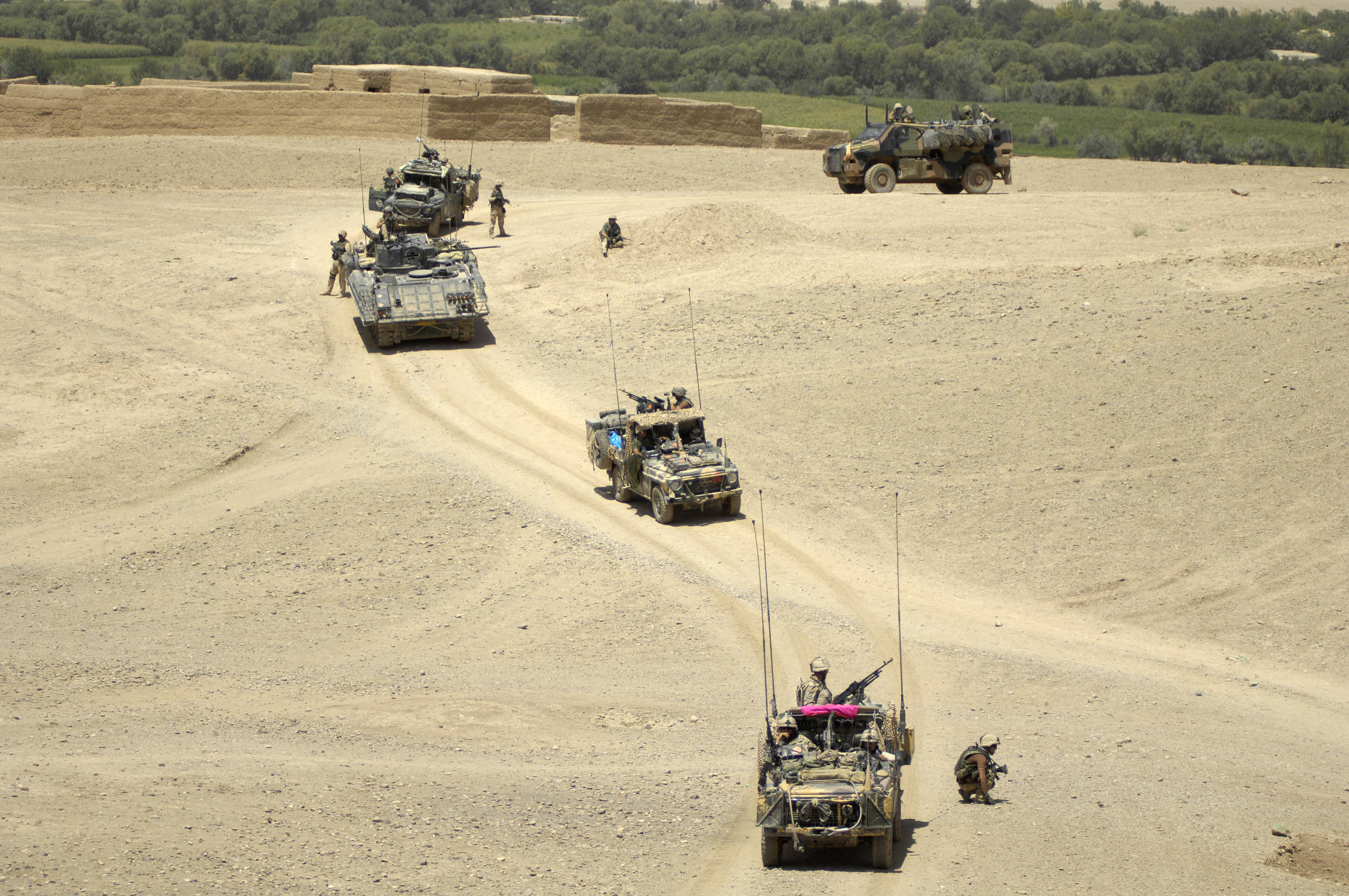
A patrol of Task Force Uruzgan moving towards an over-watch position near Mirabad Valley, in 2008.

The Netherlands deployed further troops and helicopters to Afghanistan in 2006 as part of a new security operation in the south of the country. In mid-2006, Dutch special forces of the Korps Commandotroepen as part of the Deployment Task Force successfully deployed to Tarin Kowt to lay the ground for the increasing numbers of engineers who were due to build a base there. By August 2006 the Netherlands had deployed the majority of 1,400 troops to Uruzgan province in southern Afghanistan at Kamp Holland in Tarin Kowt (1,200) and Kamp Hadrian in Deh Rahwod (200). PzH 2000 self-propelled artillery pieces were deployed and used in combat for the first time. The Dutch forces operated under the command of the ISAF Task Force Uruzgan and were involved in some of the more intensive combat operations in southern Afghanistan, including Operation Medusa and the Battle of Chora. On 18 April 2008, on the second day of his command, the son of then-Chief of Defence general Peter van Uhm, Lieutenant Dennis van Uhm, was one of two servicemen killed by a road-side explosion. As of 1 September 2008, the Netherlands had a total of 1,770 troops in Afghanistan excluding special forces troops.

Between 2002 and 2021, Dutch military personnel worked successively in the Afghan provinces of Kabul, Baghlan, Kandahar, Uruzgan, Kunduz and Balkh, with the aim, among other things, to bring stability and to build up the security apparatus, the army and the police. In total, 25 Dutch servicemen were killed in action during the deployment.

==== Resolute Support Mission ====
From 2015 until 2021, approximately 160 Dutch troops of the Korps Commandotroepen, NLMARSOF and multiple conventional support elements were deployed to the city of Mazar-e-Sharif as part of NATO's Resolute Support Mission. Dutch troops co-operated with personnel of the German Kommando Spezialkräfte as part of the German-Dutch lead Special Operations Advisory Team (SOAT). The SOAT provided advice and assistance during operations of the Afghan police tactical unit, the Afghan Territorial Force-888 (ATF-888). The SOAT was granted authority to deploy in the entirety of Afghanistan in 2019. The operations ended with the withdrawal of all United States and allied troops from Afghanistan in 2021.

=== Iraq ===
==== Multinational force in Iraq ====
A contingent of 1,345 Army and Marines Corps personnel, supported by Royal Netherlands Air Force helicopters, was deployed to Iraq in 2003, based at Camp Smitty near As Samawah (southern Iraq) with responsibility for the Muthanna Province, as part of the Multinational force in Iraq. On June 1, 2004, the Dutch government renewed their stay through 2005. The Netherlands removed its troops from Iraq in March 2005, leaving half a dozen liaison officers until late 2005. The Netherlands lost two soldiers in separate attacks.

==== Intervention against ISIL ====
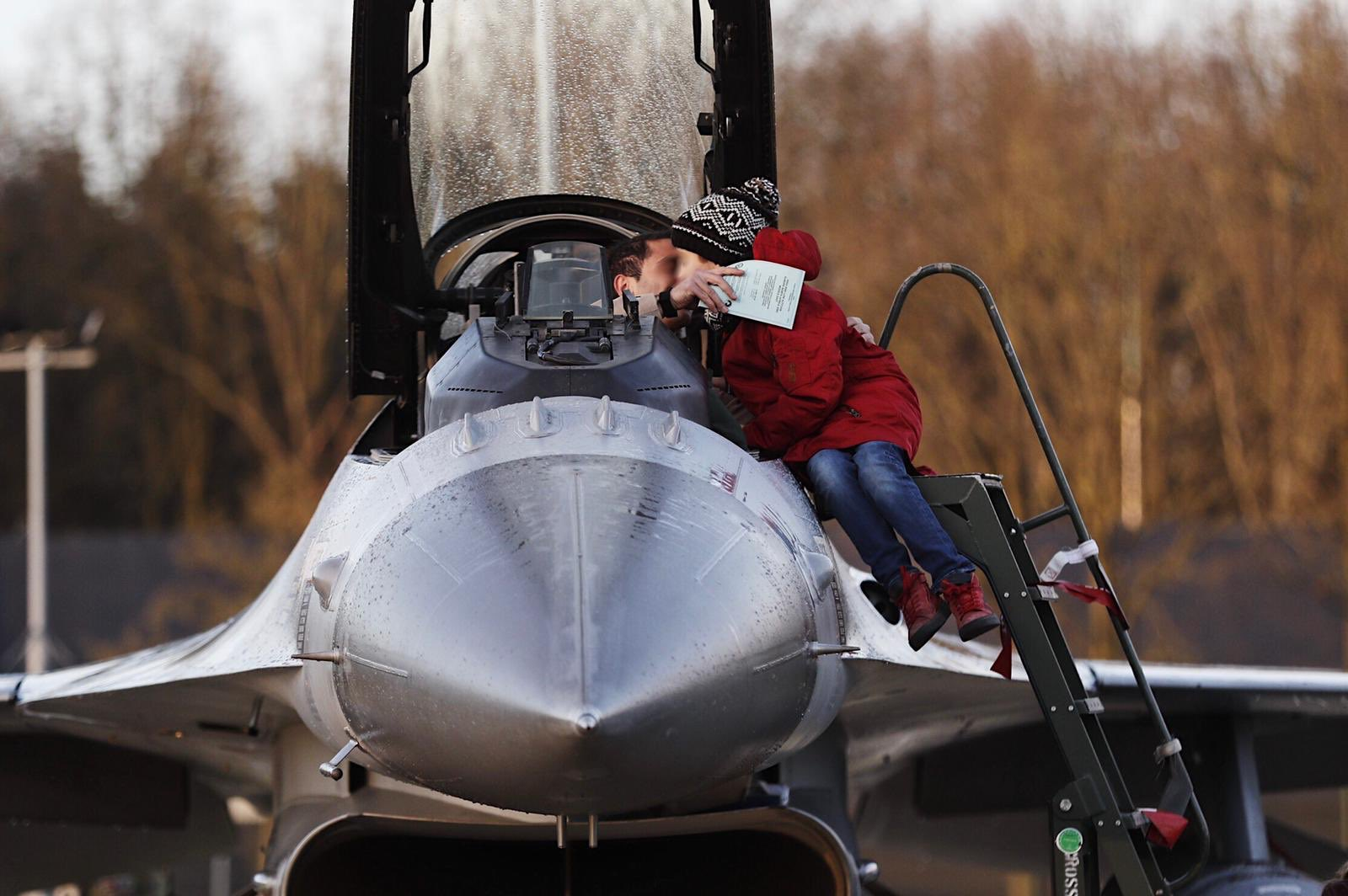
The last Dutch F-16 detachment of Air Task Force Middle East returning home from Jordan.

On 24 September 2014, the Dutch government announced its participation in the military campaign against ISIL, and sent six F-16 fighter jets to Iraq to bomb ISIL. Their motivations to join this war: ISIL's advance in Iraq and Syria, while displaying "unprecedented violence" and "perpetrating terrible crimes against population groups", formed "a direct threat for that region"; ISIL's advance in Iraq and Syria "causes instability at the borders of Europe" which threatens "our own [Dutch] safety". Figures requested by RTL Nieuws in August 2015 showed that the Netherlands was among the most active countries within the coalition, third behind only the United States and the United Kingdom. In January 2016, the Netherlands extended their bombings of ISIL to Syrian territory. By the end of July 2016 the Dutch Air Task Force flew more than 2100 missions and carried out over 1800 air strikes. At the end of the Dutch contribution to the Air Task Force, in December 2018, the Royal Netherlands Air Force had flown over 3000 missions and conducted approximately 2100 air strikes.

From 2015 until the spring of 2018, KCT and NLMARSOF special operations forces deployed advice and assist teams to northern Iraq in cooperation with the Belgian Special Forces Group. During this deployment, they provided support to Kurdish Peshmerga and Iraqi Army forces before, during and after operations in the battle against ISIL, as part of the Combined Joint Task Force – Operation Inherent Resolve.

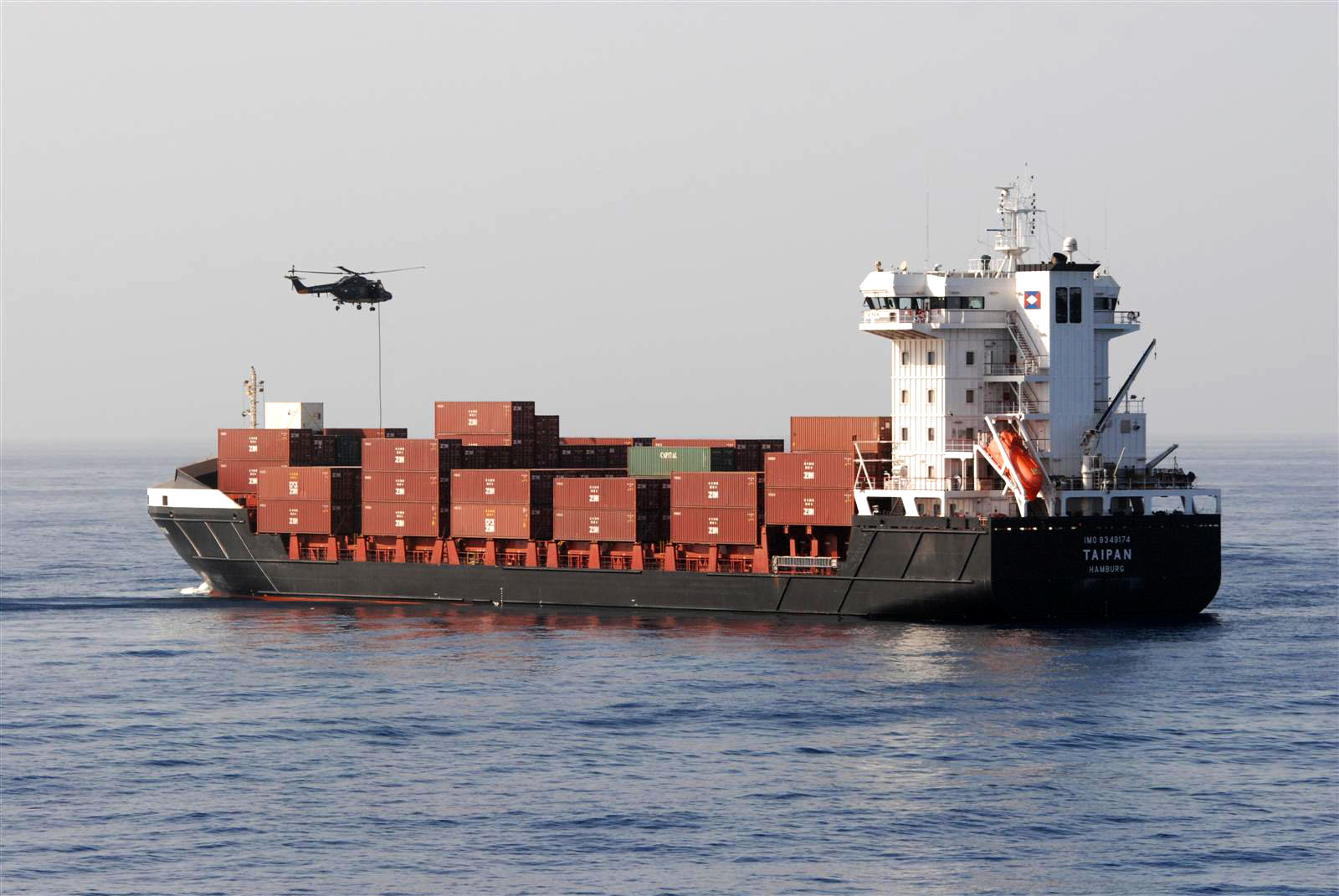
Lynx helicopter hovering over MV Taipan during the liberation operation, the boarding team rappelled onto one of the containers aboard the ship.

=== Counterpiracy ===
As a maritime nation and birthplace of the earliest maritime law, the Netherlands have historically highly valued the mare liberum principle. Hence, the Dutch government decided to contribute a significant amount of naval assets to combating piracy off the coast of Somalia since its most recent surge starting in 2005. The Royal Netherlands Navy was an active contributor to NATO's Operation Allied Protector and Operation Ocean Shield, as well as to the European Union's Operation Atalanta. Ships partaking in these missions included De Zeven Provinciën-class frigates, landing platform docks HNLMS Rotterdam and HNLMS Johan de Witt, and submarines of the Walrus-class. Additionally, surface combatants permanently carried boarding teams of the Netherlands Marine Corps. These boarding parties were often composed of operators of the Netherlands Maritime Special Operations Forces (NLMARSOF). In addition, conventional marine units supply Vessel Protection Detachments (VPDs) which continue to guard Dutch merchant vessels during transits through piracy-prone waters as of 2021.

The Dutch naval forces were regularly engaged in combat. Firefights between the naval ships and Somali pirates have cost the lives of pirates on multiple occasions. During the Action of 5 April 2010, a boarding team of the Unit Interventie Mariniers liberated container ship MV Taipan after rappelling down from HNLMS Tromp's helicopter onto containers on the ship's deck under the cover of machine gun fire. The successful operation was filmed with a helmet camera, the video footage reached worldwide news media and gained millions of views on YouTube. Moreover, NLMARSOF frogmen have successfully conducted sabotage operations of pirates' motherships by clandestinely attaching explosives to the ships' bilge.

=== Mali ===
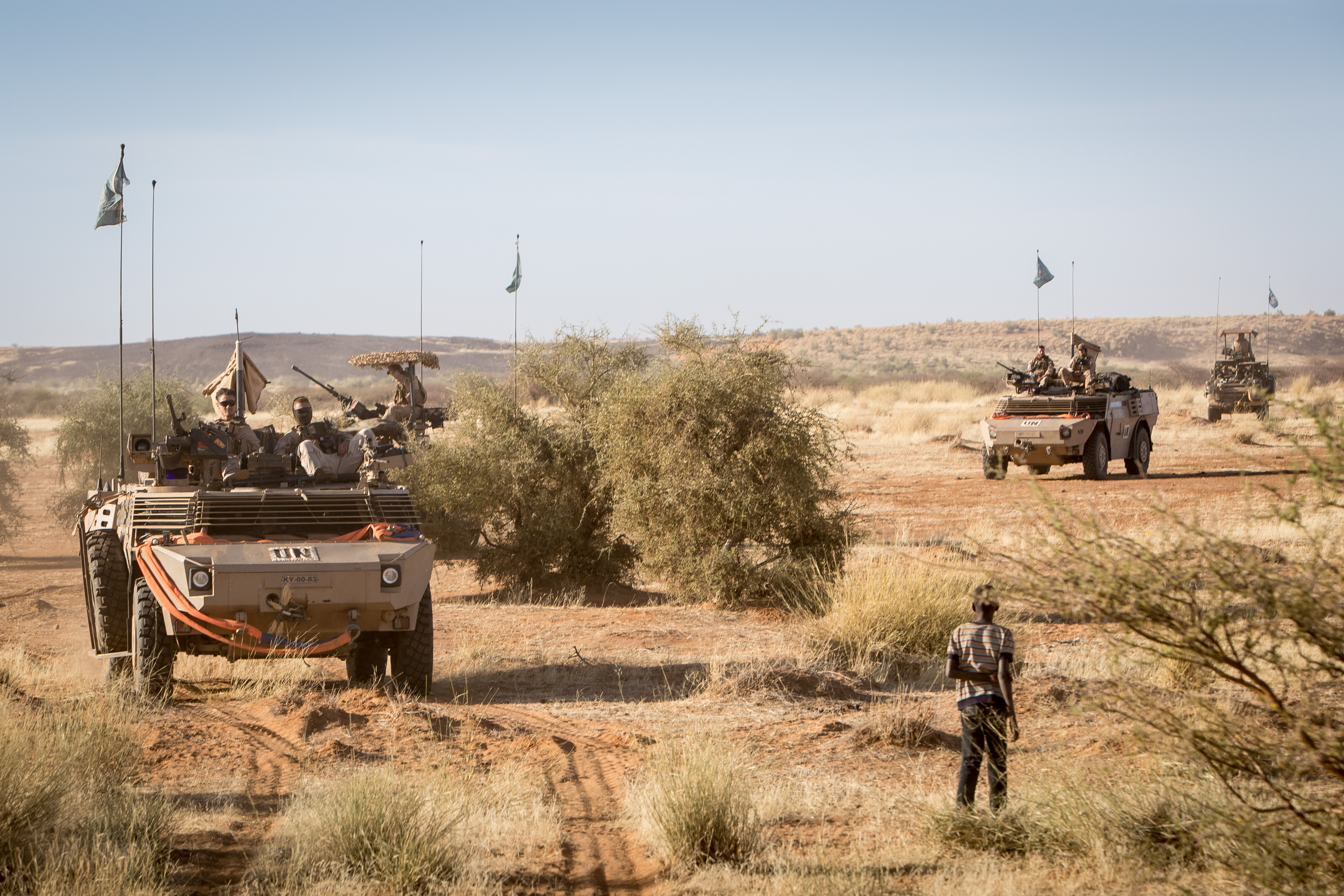
Dutch forces patrolling the plains north of Gao using Fennek reconnaissance vehicles.

Special forces of the Korps Commandotroepen were deployed to Mali since 2014 as part of the UN mission MINUSMA. The primary task of the Dutch forces was to gather intelligence on local Islamist and rebel groups and to protect the people of Mali against said groups. Since 2016, conventional detachments consisting of 11 Air Assault Brigade and 13 Light Brigade troops were part of the MINUSMA rotations as well. Additionally, the Dutch contribution consisted of a RNLAF AH-64 Apache and CH-47 Chinook detachment which provided the necessary air support and transport for the infantry units on the ground.

On 16 March 2015, a Dutch AH-64D Apache attack helicopter of the Dutch MINUSMA air detachment crashed during a firing exercise, killing the two pilots. On 6 July 2016, two servicemen of 11 Air Assault Brigade were killed during a mortar-firing exercise, while a third serviceman was severely wounded. The incident lead to the resignation of the minister of Defence Jeanine Hennis-Plasschaert and Chief of Defence General Tom Middendorp after a critical report by the Dutch Safety Board found that the safety standards were subpar. The Netherlands ended their sizable contribution to the peacekeeping mission in May 2019 to send additional troops to Afghanistan instead.

== Central staff ==
Chief of Defence		Appointed	Branch
Onno Eichelsheim	General; Onno Eichelsheim (Born 1966)	15 April 2021 (5 years, 193 days)	Royal Netherlands Air and Space Force (Attack helicopters)
Vice Chief of Defence		Appointed	Branch
Ludy Schmidt	Lieutenant general Ludy Schmidt	27 October 2024 (1 year, 363 days)	Royal Netherlands Army (Infantry)
Commander of the Army		Appointed	Branch
Jan Swillens	Lieutenant general Jan Swillens (Born 1967)	8 March 2024 (2 years, 83 days)	Royal Netherlands Army (Commandos)
Commander of the Navy		Appointed	Branch
Harold Liebregs	Vice admiral Harold Liebregs (Born 1968)	18 September 2025 (1 year, 37 days)	Royal Netherlands Navy (Submarine Service)
Commander of the Air Force		Appointed	Branch
André Steur	Lieutenant general André Steur (Born 1970)	14 April 2023 (3 years, 193 days)	Royal Netherlands Air and Space Force (Fighters)
Commander of the Royal Marechaussee		Appointed	Branch
Annelore Roelofs	Lieutenant general Roger Costongs (Born 1973)	27 August 2026 (59 days)	Royal Marechaussee (South Netherlands District)
