= Henk van den Breemen =

Dutch military officer (1941–2024)

General Henk van den Breemen
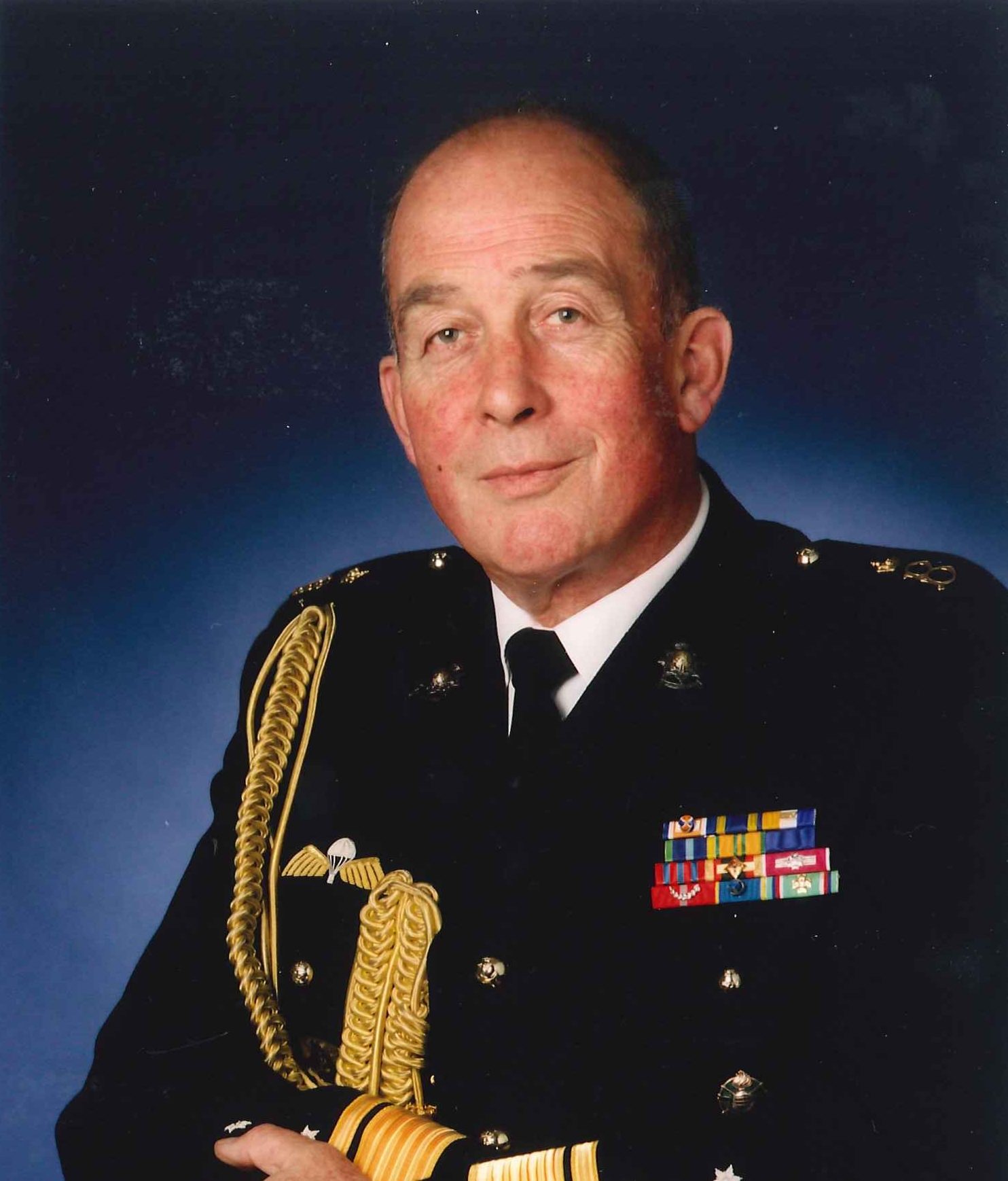

Chief of the Defence Staff
- In office 15 August 1994 – 5 June 1998
- Preceded by: General Arie van der Vlis
- Succeeded by: Lieutenant admiral Luuk Kroon

Personal details
- Born: Hendrik Gijsbert Bernhard Henk van den Breemen; 23 March 1941 Valkenswaard, German-occupied Netherlands
- Died: 20 January 2024 (aged 82) Mijnsheerenland, Netherlands

Military service
- Allegiance: Netherlands
- Branch/service: Netherlands Marine Corps
- Years of service: 1960–1998
- Rank: General

Hendrik Gijsbert Bernhard "Henk" van den Breemen (23 March 1941 – 20 January 2024) was a Dutch military officer.

== Biography ==
Van den Breemen started his military career as a Midshipsman for the Marines in 1960. From June 1987 till June 1998 he served as Chief of Staff and Deputy Commander of the Royal Netherlands Marine Corps. As Vice Chief of Defence Staff he was actively involved with the reorganization of the Defence Staff, being responsible for the Defence Priority Papers ("Quality for Quantity") (1991–1994). Van den Breemen ended his military career as Chief of Defence Staff (August 1994 – June 1998). Former minister Henk Kamp said that one of the reasons to appoint van den Breemen as CoD was his role as Commanding Officer of the first Amphibious Combat Group (1981–1982) and the development of the Dutch-British "Amphibious Force" which became a "Battlegroup" between 2006 and 2010.

Van den Breemen was appointed Commander of the Order of Orange-Nassau with Swords and as Knight of the Order of the Netherlands Lion. He was also decorated as Commander of the Legion of Merit (USA) and the "Grosse Verdienstkreuz mit Stern und Schulterband des Verdienstordens der Bundesrepublik Deutschland". Sweden, Norway and the Czech Republic also decorated van den Breemen.

Latterly, van den Breemen, together with four former colleagues, wrote a pamphlet entitled: "Towards a Grand Strategy for an Uncertain Word; Renewing Transatlantic Partnership". The "Gang of five", as they were called when the pamphlet was presented in Washington DC (January 2008), consisted of General (ret.) John Shalikashvili (USA), General (ret.) Dr. Klaus Naumann (Germany), Admiral (ret.) Jacques Lanxade and Field Marshal the Lord Inge (UK).

In the pamphlet an analyses of trends and challenges is given as well as an analyses of the present capabilities of institutions, organizations and politics. Based on this, a Grand Strategy is suggested and an Agenda for Change is given. The whole idea is about restoring certainty by renewing the Transatlantic Partnership. The pamphlet was presented in Washington DC and in Brussels. It was also presented to presidents, prime-ministers, ministers and the leadership of the NATO and the EU.

Van den Breemen acted among other activities as an advisor, e.g. of the Noaber Foundation, where he was Chairman of the Advisory Board. The Noaber Foundation is a Dutch Philanthropic and Social Venture.

On 18 March 2010, the general was named as the source for general John J. Sheehan's claim that the Srebrenica massacre was caused because the Dutch UN troops included gays. In a Dutch Defense Ministry statement, van den Breemen responded that this claim was "absolute nonsense"; Sheehan later issued a full retraction and apology to van den Breemen by e-mail, stating that the failure of Dutch UN troops "was in no way the fault of the individual soldiers".

Van den Breemen died on 20 January 2024, at the age of 82.
