= Dick Berlijn =

Dutch general

General Dick Lodewijk Berlijn
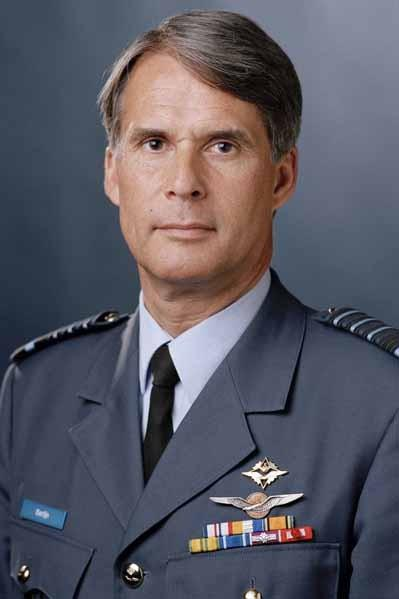
- Berlijn in 2005

Chief of Defence
- In office 5 June 2004 – 17 April 2008
- Preceded by: Lieutenant admiral Luuk Kroon
- Succeeded by: General Peter van Uhm

Personal details
- Born: March 18, 1950 (age 76) Amsterdam
- Awards: Legion of Merit, NATO Medal, Order of Orange-Nassau, Légion d´honneur
- Nickname: "Quicky"

Military service
- Allegiance: Netherlands
- Branch/service: Royal Netherlands Air and Space Force
- Years of service: 1969–2008
- Rank: General
- Commands: Chief of the Netherlands Defence Staff
- Battles/wars: Lebanon (UNIFIL); Operation Deny Flight; War in Afghanistan; International Security Assistance Force

General Dick Lodewijk Berlijn (born March 18, 1950, in Amsterdam) is a retired Royal Netherlands Air Force four-star general, who served as Chief of Defence of the Netherlands (Chief of the Netherlands Defence Staff) from 2004, when he succeeded Lt. Adm. Luuk Kroon, until 2008, when he was succeeded by Gen. Peter van Uhm. In 2005, the post was renamed from Chef-Defensiestaf to Commandant der Strijdkrachten ("Commander of the Armed Forces") following a reorganisation, but the term "Chief of Defence Staff" is still the one usually used in English translations. His office saw Dutch military presence in Uruzgan with ISAF, as well as naval contributions to the United Nations Interim Force in Lebanon, among other interventions. He has been awarded with the Légion d'honneur and the Legion of merit, and the Order of Orange-Nassau, all in the degree of commander, and the Order of Orange-Nassau with swords. Berlijn graduated from the Koninklijke Militaire Academie in 1973.

== Awards and honours ==
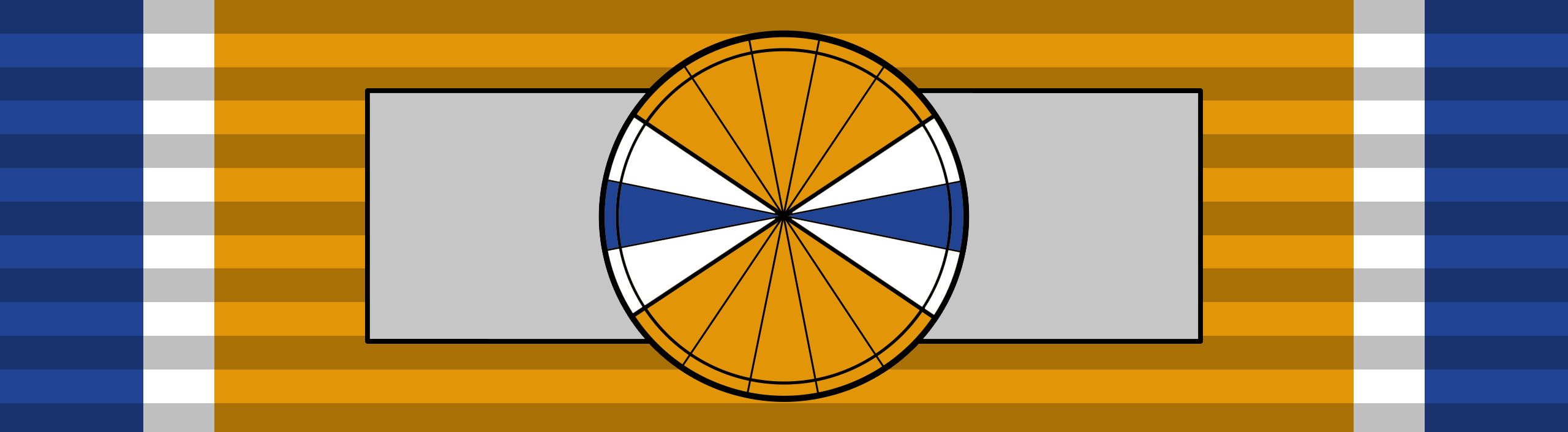
Commander in the Order of Orange-Nassau with the Swords
Commander in the Legion of Merit
Commander in the Legion of Honour
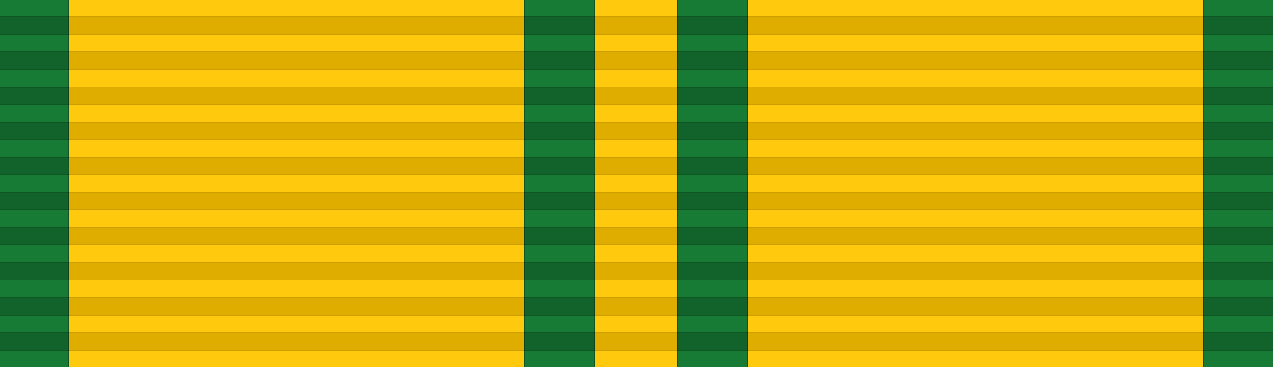
Cross for the Four Day Marches
Officers Cross
NATO Medal for the former Yugoslavia

New title	Chief of Defence; 5 September 2005-17 April 2008	Succeeded by Peter van Uhm
Preceded by Luuk Kroon	Chief of the Netherlands Defence Staff (old, Chef-Defensiestaf); 2004-5 September 2005	Position discontinued
