= Govert Huijser =

Dutch military officer (1931–2014)

General Govert Huijser
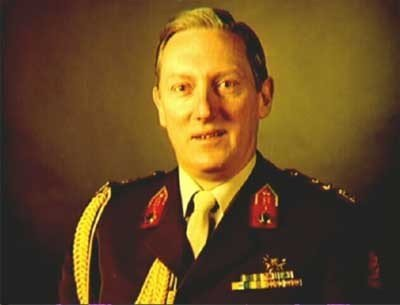
- Huijser in 1986

Chiefs of the Defence Staff
- In office 5 July 1983 – 10 December 1988
- Preceded by: General Cor de Jager
- Succeeded by: General Peter Graaff

Personal details
- Born: Govert Lambertus Johan Huijser; February 6, 1931 Surabaya, Indonesia
- Died: January 5, 2014 (aged 82) Roosendaal, Netherlands

Military service
- Allegiance: Netherlands
- Branch/service: Royal Netherlands Army
- Years of service: 1952-1988
- Rank: General

Govert Huijser (6 February 1931 – 5 January 2014) was a Dutch general and Chief of the Defence Staff between 1983 and 1988.

Huijser was born in Surabaya, in the then Dutch East Indies. During World War II he was imprisoned in a Japanese internment camp. In 1949 he enrolled in the Royal Military Academy of the Netherlands. He graduated as a second lieutenant.

As major general he served as commanding officer of the First Division "7 December".

In 1983 he was promoted to Chief of the Defence Staff (Dutch:Chef Defensiestaf). During this time he was the only four-star general of the Netherlands. In 1986 he was made aide-de-camp to Queen Beatrix of the Netherlands. In 1988 he reached the mandatory age of retirement, he was succeeded as Chief of the Defence Staff by Peter Graaff.

He died on 5 January 2014 in Roosendaal.
