= Luuk Kroon =

Lieutenant admiral Luuk Kroon
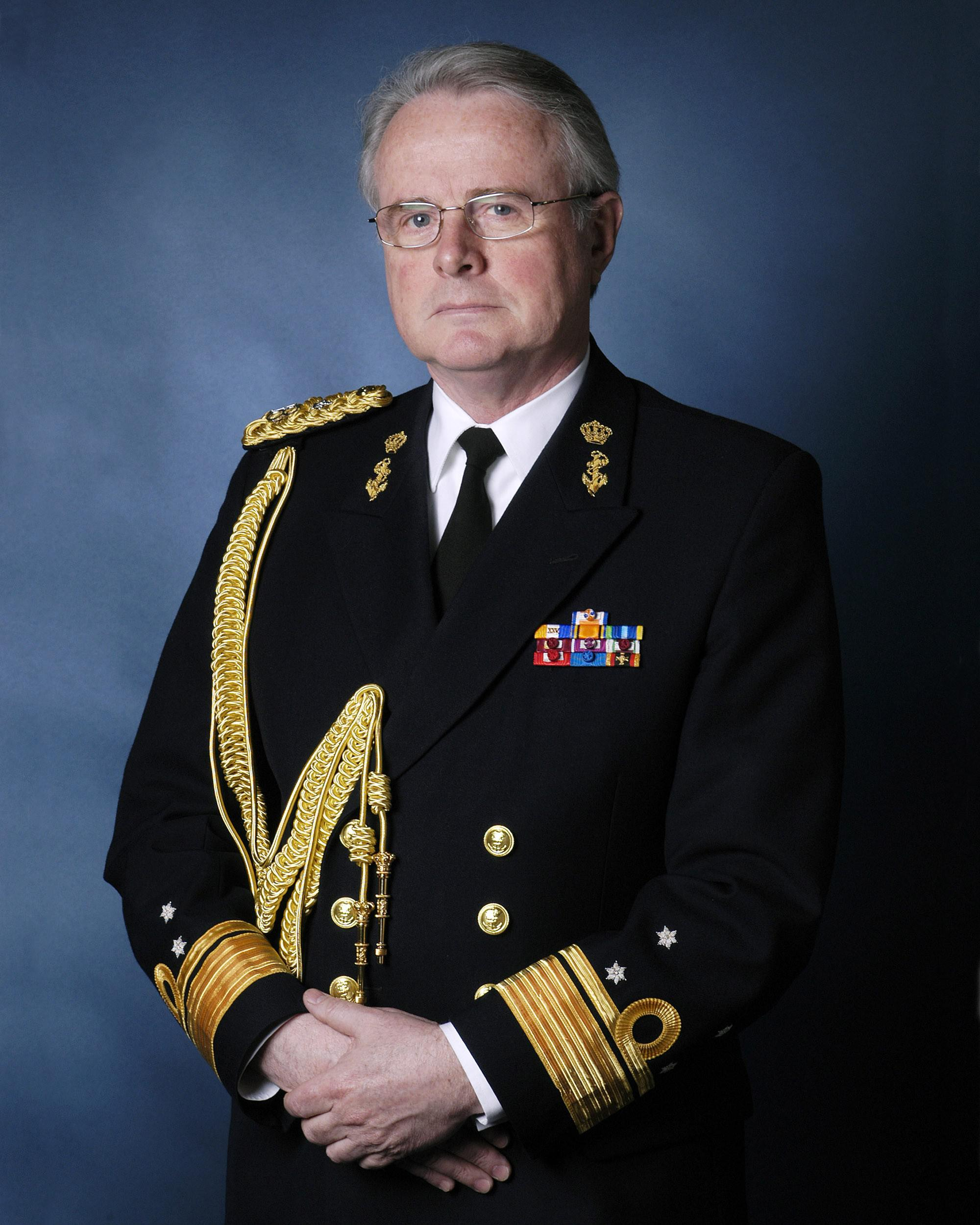
- Kroon in 2004

Chiefs of the Defence Staff
- In office 5 June 1998 – 5 June 2004
- Preceded by: General Henk van den Breemen
- Succeeded by: General Dick Berlijn

Personal details
- Born: 13 December 1942 Ridderkerk, Netherlands
- Died: 19 June 2012 (aged 69) The Hague, Netherlands

Military service
- Allegiance: Netherlands
- Branch/service: Royal Netherlands Navy
- Years of service: 1961–2004
- Rank: Lieutenant admiral

Luuk Kroon (13 December 1942, Ridderkerk – 19 June 2012) was a Dutch naval officer. Kroon served as the Commander of the Royal Netherlands Navy from 1995 to 1998 and Chief of the Netherlands Defence Staff from 1998 until 2004. He died in The Hague on 19 June 2012, at the age of 69.

== Awards and decorations ==
- Commander of the Order of Orange-Nassau with Swords
- Officer's Long Service Cross
- Marriage Medal 2002 (celebrates the wedding of Willem-Alexander of the Netherlands and Máxima Zorreguieta)
- Navy Medal
- Grand Officer of the Order of the Crown of Belgium
- Commander of the Legion of Merit (United States)
- Commander of the Legion of Honour (France)
- Officer of the National Order of Merit (France) (Ordre National du Mérite)
- Cross of Honour of the Bundeswehr in Gold (Germany)
