= Arie van der Vlis =

Dutch military officer (1940–2020)

General Arie van der Vlis
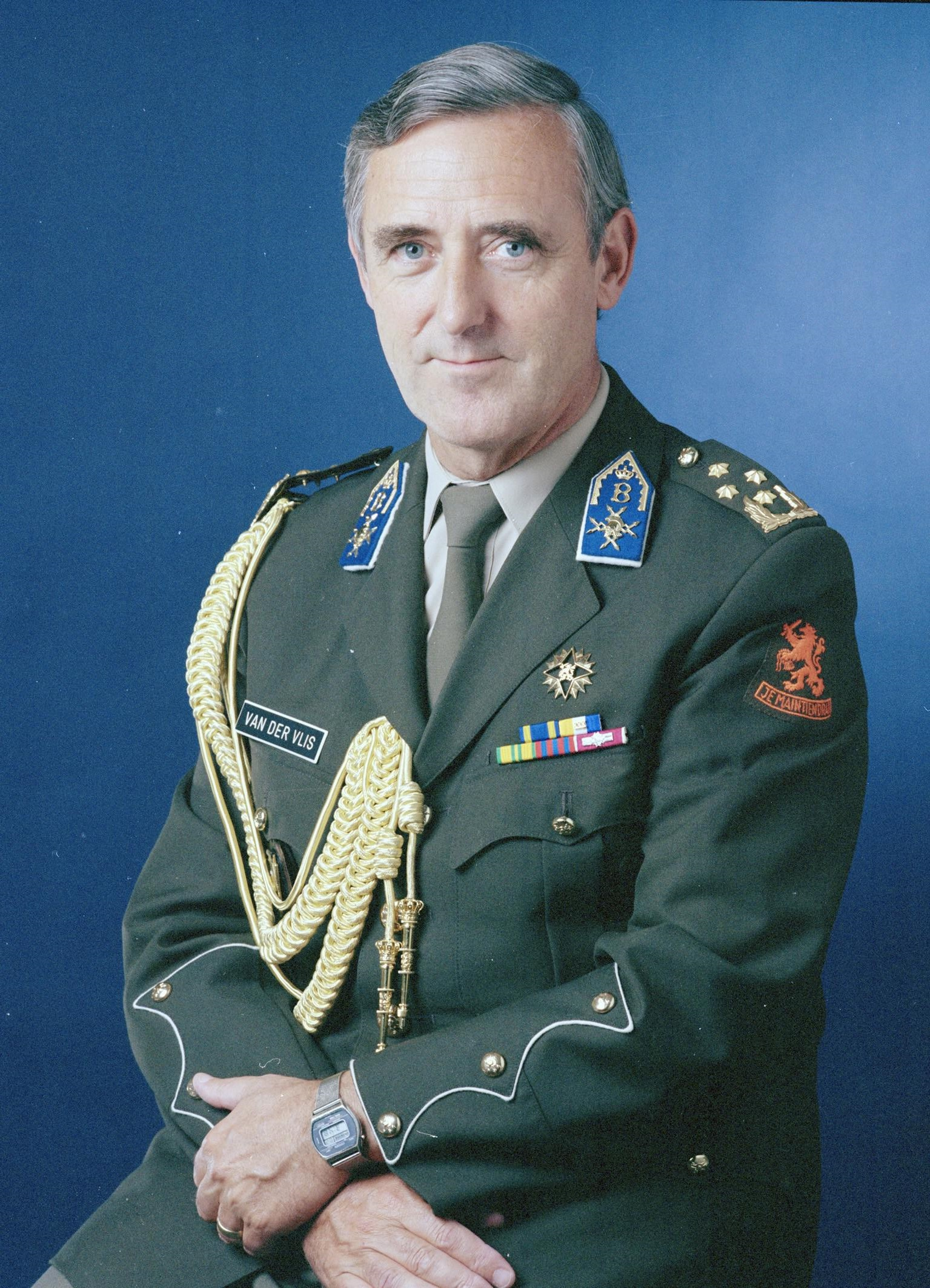

Chiefs of the Defence Staff
- In office 10 May 1992 – 15 August 1994
- Preceded by: General Peter Graaff
- Succeeded by: General Henk van den Breemen

Personal details
- Born: August 20, 1940 Leeuwarden, Netherlands
- Died: July 4, 2020 (aged 79) Rijnsburg, Netherlands
- Nickname: The smiling General

Military service
- Allegiance: Netherlands
- Branch/service: Royal Netherlands Army
- Years of service: 1958-1994
- Rank: General

General Arie van der Vlis (20 August 1940 – 4 July 2020) was a Dutch military officer who served as Chief of the Defence Staff between 1992 and 1994.
