= Conscription in the Netherlands =

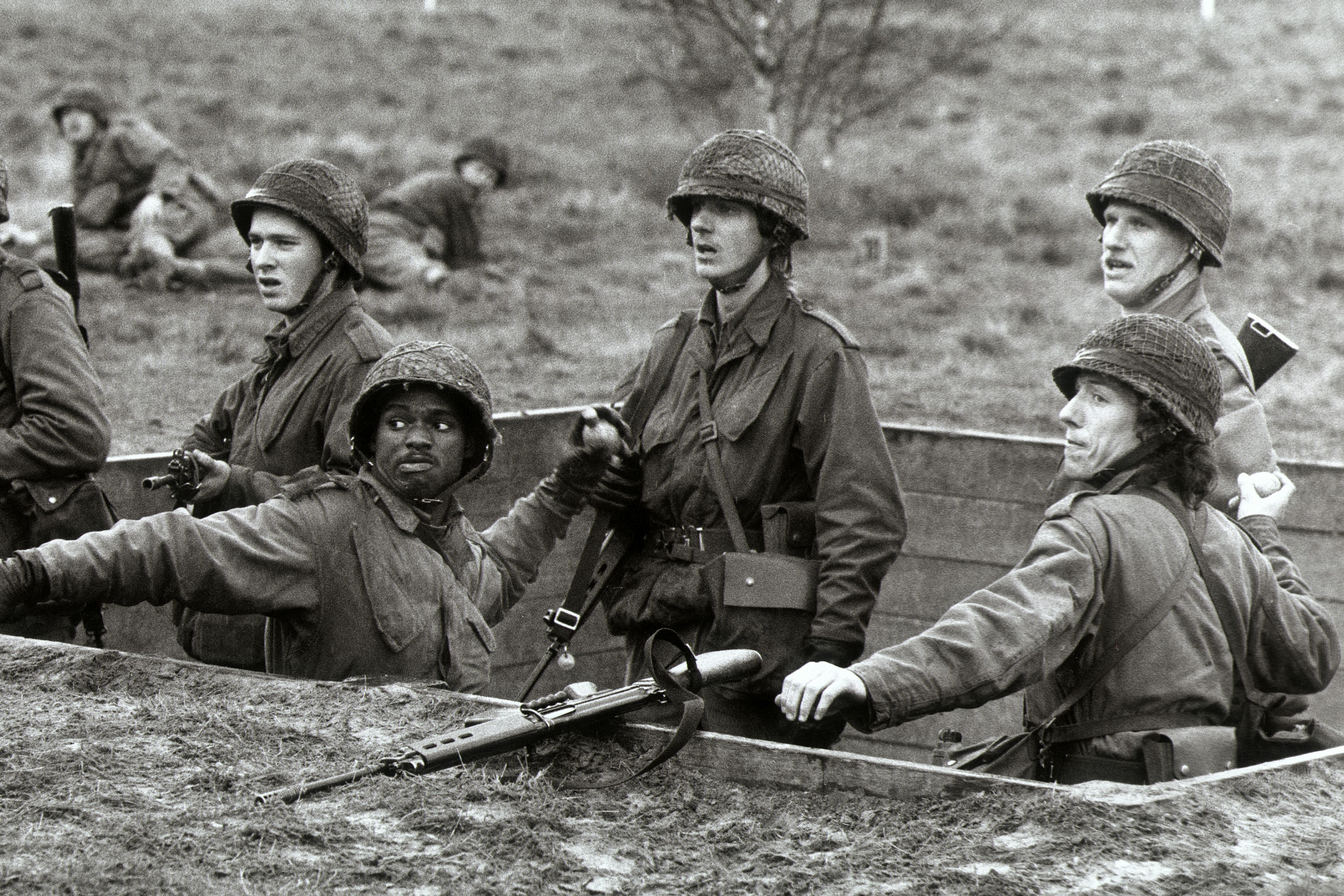
Dutch conscripts practice throwing hand grenades, 1985

Conscription in the Netherlands (Dutch: dienstplicht) was first employed in 1810 by French occupying forces. Napoleon's brother Louis Bonaparte, who was King of Holland from 1806 to 1810, had tried to introduce conscription a few years earlier, unsuccessfully. Every man aged 20 years or older had to enlist. By means of drawing lots it was decided who had to undertake service in the French army. It was possible to arrange a substitute against payment.

But later on, conscription was used for all men over the age of 18. Once called to serve, recruits typically served 14 or 16 months. During the months of service recruits receive basic training for two and half months and are on active duty for the remainder of the period. Following service, conscripts are placed in reserve. Postponement was possible but that has never been stated, due to study, for example. Conscientious objectors could perform an alternative civilian service instead of military service. For various reasons, this forced military service was criticized at the end of the twentieth century. Since the Cold War was over, so was the direct threat of a war. Instead, the Dutch army was employed in more and more peacekeeping operations. The complexity and danger of these missions made the use of conscripts controversial. Furthermore, the conscription system was thought to be unfair as only men were drafted.

In the European part of Netherlands, compulsory attendance has been officially suspended since 1 May 1997. Between 1991 and 1996, the Dutch armed forces phased out their conscript personnel and converted to an all-volunteer force. The last conscript troops were inducted in 1995 and demobilized in 1996. The suspension means that citizens are no longer forced to serve in the armed forces, as long as it is not required for the safety of the country.

Even though it is generally thought that conscription has been abolished in the Netherlands, this perception is, in fact, incorrect. The compulsory attendance was abolished, not the conscription. The laws and systems which provide for the conscription of armed forces personnel still remain in place. As of 2020 conscription was changed to also include women. Every citizen aged 17 gets a letter in which they are told that they have been registered, but that they do not have to present themselves for service. In Curaçao, active conscription is still in existence.
