= Onno Eichelsheim =

Dutch air force general (born 1966)

General Onno Eichelsheim
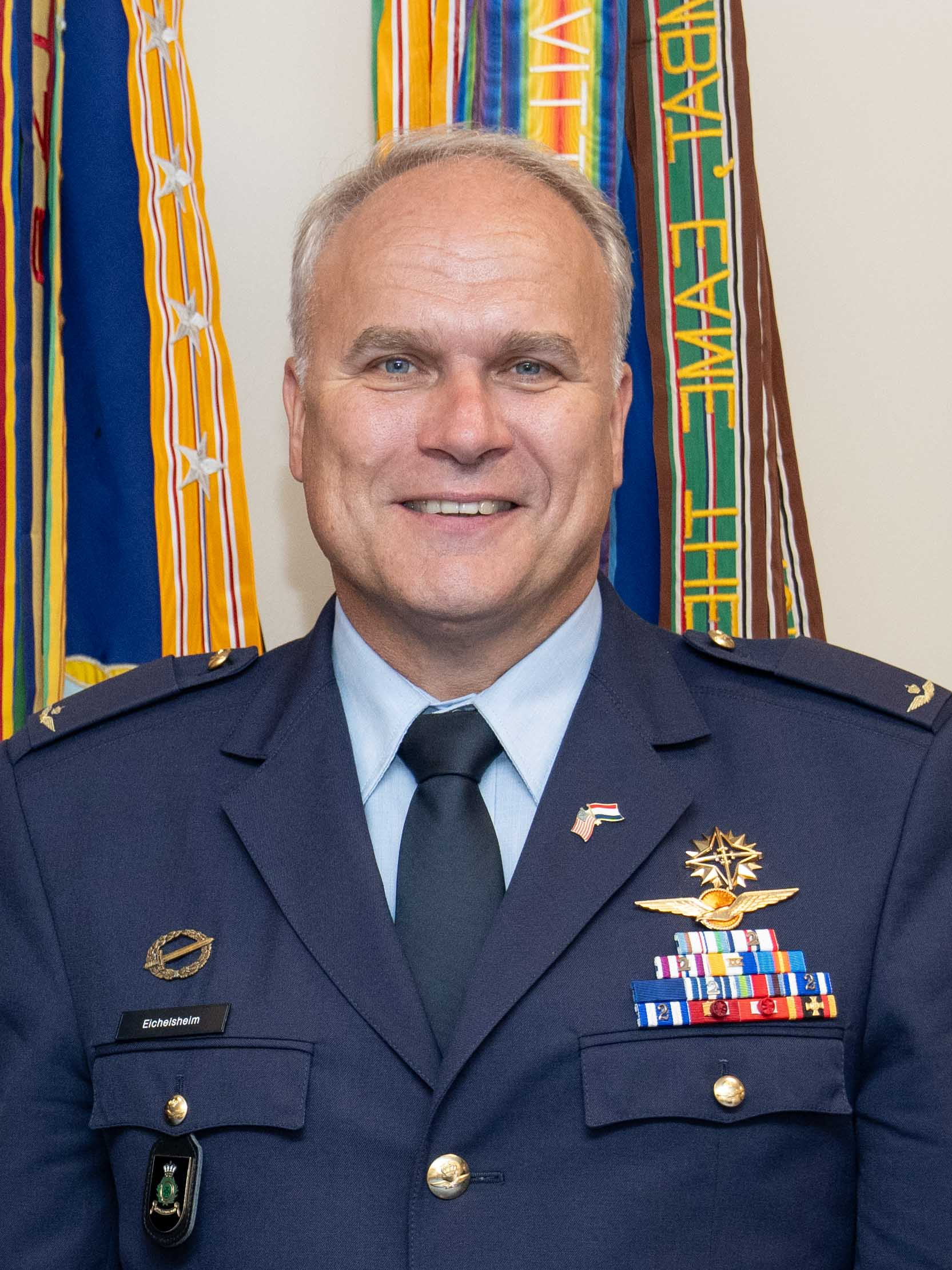
- Eichelsheim in 2024

Chief of Defence
- Incumbent
- Assumed office 15 April 2021
- Preceded by: Lieutenant admiral Rob Bauer

Personal details
- Born: 1966 (age 59–60) Schiedam, Netherlands

Military service
- Allegiance: Netherlands
- Branch/service: Royal Netherlands Air and Space Force
- Years of service: 1986-present
- Rank: General
- Commands: Chief of Defence; Vice Chief of Defence; Director MIVD; Director of Operations RNLAF; Helicopter Operations Department, Defence Helicopter Command; 301 Squadron
- Battles/wars: Yugoslav Wars; United Nations Protection Force; Stabilisation Force (SFOR); Ethiopia & Eritrea (UNMEE); War in Afghanistan

Onno Eichelsheim (born 1966) is a general in the Royal Netherlands Air Force serving as Chief of Defence (Dutch: Commandant der Strijdkrachten) of the Netherlands Armed Forces since 15 April 2021. Prior to his post, he served as the Vice Chief of Defence from 1 July 2019 to 8 March 2021.

== Career ==
Eichelsheim was born in Schiedam, grew up in Bergambacht and attended high school in Schoonhoven. His military career commenced in August 1986 at the Koninklijke Militaire Academie as a cadet of the Royal Netherlands Air Force (RNLAF), destined for a position as helicopter pilot. In 1990 he graduated at the military academy, and completed the elementary helicopter pilot training to become a pilot at Deelen Air Base's 299 Squadron, which was equipped with MBB Bo 105 helicopters. Consequently, Eichelsheim completed training to become an AH-64 Apache pilot after which he served at 301 Squadron, the first RNLAF squadron to be equipped with the Apache attack helicopters in 1995. He subsequently served as the deputy flight commander of the first Dutch Apache Squadron to train at Fort Hood, Texas, as part of the unit's training programme with the .

In 2000, Eichelsheim was responsible for the planning of the first deployment of an Apache detachment to Djibouti for the United Nations peacekeeping mission UNMEE. Thereafter, he was appointed commander of the Apache Helicopter Group of 11th Airmobile Brigade. In 2005, Eichelsheim took over the command of 301 Squadron, which was amalgamated with two AH-64D Squadrons. From 2009 until August 2011, Eichelsheim was responsible for Operational Policy and Acquisitions in the rank of lieutenant-colonel, where he spearheaded the replacement and the modernization of the CH-47F Chinook helicopters, and the acquisition of the NH90 NFH helicopters.

From 2011 to 2013, Eichelsheim was head of the Helicopter Operations Department of the Defence Helicopter Command.

Eichelsheim was appointed Director of Operations of the RNLAF in June 2014 and was promoted to commodore. In this function, he was responsible for the planning and execution of foreign operations.

In early April 2016, Eichelsheim was appointed director of the Dutch Military Intelligence and Security Service (Dutch: Militaire Inlichtingen- en Veiligheidsdienst, MIVD) and promoted to major general. Eichelsheim made several news media appearances in October 2018, when the MIVD publicised a disrupted close-access cyberattack at the headquarters of the OPCW in The Hague by the Russian military intelligence service GRU.

On 1 July 2019, Eichelsheim was succeeded by Major General Jan Swillens as director of the MIVD, and was promoted to lieutenant general to serve as Vice Chief of Defence. He also served as a member of the Cyber Security Council, the Dutch Government's primary and independent advisory body, in charge of cyber security matters in the country. Eichelsheim stepped down as the Vice Chief of Defence on 5 March 2021, in order to prepare for his post as the new Chief of Defence. He remained in his post until 8 March 2021, as he was replaced by Vice Admiral Boudewijn Boots.

On 15 April 2021, Eichelsheim was named as the Chief of Defence of the Netherlands Armed Forces, and promoted to general, replacing Lieutenant Admiral Rob Bauer.

== Deployments ==
In his operational career, Eichelsheim has gone on five peacekeeping deployments: three deployments to Bosnia and two deployments to Afghanistan. Among others, he served as commander of the Apache Detachment of SFOR in Tuzla from 15 June 1999 to 15 September 1999.

In 2004, he served as commander of the Apache Detachment of ISAF as a lieutenant-colonel in the Afghan capital of Kabul.

His most recent deployment was in 2006 with TFU-1 in Tarin Kowt, in the province of Uruzgan, where he served as the commander of the Air Taskforce (ATF) at Kamp Holland within Multi National Base Tarin Kot. On 26 February 2007, Eichelsheim transferred his command of the ATF to his successor.

== Awards ==
Eichelsheim is entitled to wear the following (military) awards and decorations:

Insignia	Name
	Commemorative Medal for UN Peacekeeping Operations
	Commemorative Medal for Multinational Peacekeeping Operations with digit "2"
	Commemorative Medal for Peacekeeping Operations with digit "2"
	Officer's Cross with digit "XXX"
	Elfstedenkruis with digit "2"
	Skill Medal of the Dutch Sports Federation
	Commander in the Legion of Honour
	United Nations UNPROFOR medal
	NATO Medal for Former Yugoslavia with digit "2"
	NATO Non-Article 5 Medal with digit "2"
	Order of Merit with digit "3" (Ukraine)
	Decoration of Honor of the Commander-in-Chief of the Armed Forces of Ukraine – "Cross of Merit"

Eichelsheim is entitled to wear the following insignia:

Insignia	Name
	Military Pilot Wings
	Combat Badge
	Golden Sun of the Higher Defence Command Formation

== Personal life ==
Eichelsheim is married, and father to a daughter and two sons.

Military offices
Preceded by Rob Bauer	Chief of Defence; 2021–present	Incumbent
