= Ministry of Defence (Netherlands) =

Government ministry of the Netherlands

- Ministerie van Defensie
- Logo of the Ministry of Defence

- Ministry of Defence

Department overview
- Formed: 1 September 1928; 98 years ago
- Jurisdiction: Kingdom of the Netherlands
- Headquarters: Plein 4, The Hague, Netherlands
- Employees: 46,936 active duty 9,859 reserve forces 29,245 civilian staff
- Annual budget: €26,8 billion (2026)
- Minister responsible: Dilan Yeşilgöz, Minister of Defence
- Deputy Minister responsible: Derk Boswijk, State Secretary for Arms Procurement and Personnel
- Department executives: Maarten Schurink, Secretary-General; General Onno Eichelsheim, Chief of the Defence
- Website: https://www.defensie.nl

The Ministry of Defence (Dutch: Ministerie van Defensie; MinDef) is the Dutch ministry responsible for the armed forces of the Netherlands and veterans' affairs. The ministry was created in 1813 as the Ministry of War and in 1928 was combined with the Ministry of the Navy. After World War II the ministries were separated again, in this period the Minister of War and Minister of the Navy were often the same person and the state secretary for the Navy was responsible for daily affairs of the Royal Netherlands Navy. In 1959 the ministries were merged once again. The ministry is headed by the Minister of Defence, currently Dilan Yeşilgöz, assisted by the Chief of the Defence, Onno Eichelsheim.

== Responsibilities ==
The ministry is responsible for:

- protecting the territory of the Kingdom of the Netherlands (which includes the Netherlands, Curaçao, Sint Maarten and Aruba) and her allies;
- protecting and enhancing the international legal system and stability;
- supporting civil authorities in maintaining order, in case of emergencies and in giving humanitarian aid, both national and international.

== Organisation ==
The ministry consists of the Minister (Dilan Yeşilgöz) and the State Secretary of Defence (Derk Boswijk), the so-called Central Staff, the Netherlands Armed Forces and two supporting organisations.

The Central Staff of the ministry is led by the Secretary-General, the highest civil servant. The most important elements of the Central Staff are:

- several directorates for policy, personnel, materiel and finance
- the Defence Staff
- the Defence Audit Service
- the Security Authority
- the Military Intelligence and Security Service
- the Military Aviation Authority

The highest military official is the Chief of Defence (Dutch: Commandant der Strijdkrachten). He is a four-star general or admiral and controls the branches of the armed forces, which are organised in three operational commands:

- the Royal Netherlands Navy Command;
- the Royal Netherlands Army Command;
- the Royal Netherlands Air and Space Force Command.

The fourth branch of service, the Royal Netherlands Marechaussee, is a gendarmerie force that falls directly under the Secretary-General.

The armed forces are supported by two civil organisations that reside under the Ministry of Defence:

- the Joint Support Command (Dutch: Defensie Ondersteuningscommando); and
- the Materiel and IT Command (Dutch: Commando Materieel en IT).

The ministry employs around 86,000 civil and military personnel.

== See also ==
- List of ministers of defence of the Netherlands
- Defence diplomacy
