= Royal insignia (Netherlands) =

Military insignia of the King of the Netherlands

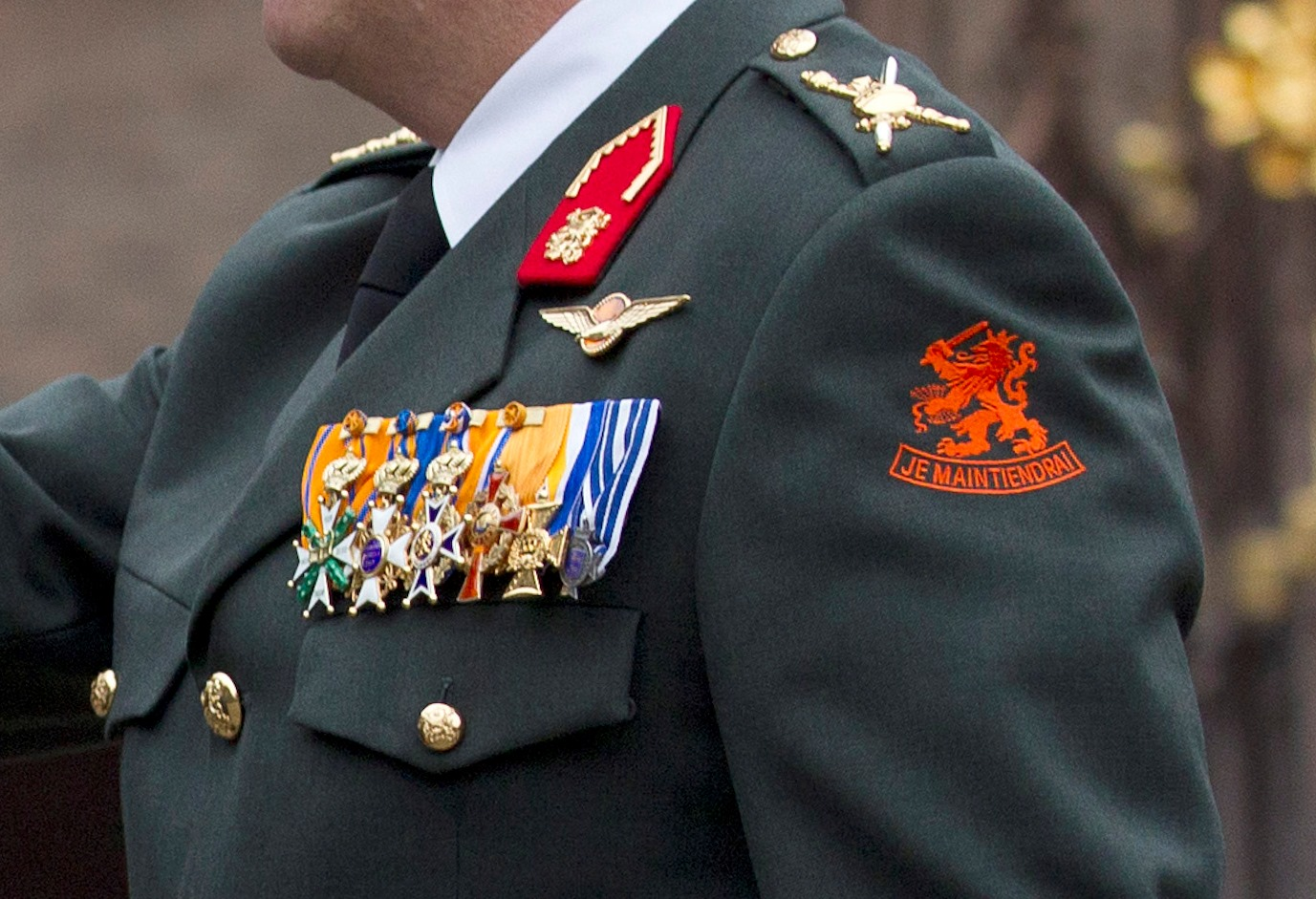
Close-up of the king's military uniform with the royal insignia

The royal insignia (Dutch: koninklijk distinctief) is the military insignia specially designed for Willem-Alexander of the Netherlands for use on his military uniforms after his investiture as King of the Netherlands in 2013. The insignia depicts a globus cruciger (orb and cross) with the sword of state and a sceptre crossed behind it. The King wears the insignia on his shoulder straps in lieu of the shoulder marks used as rank insignia in the Dutch Armed Forces.

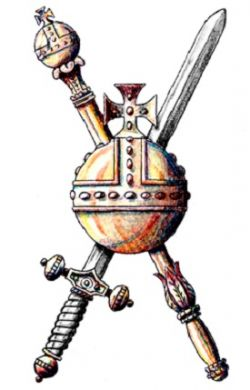
Royal insignia drawing

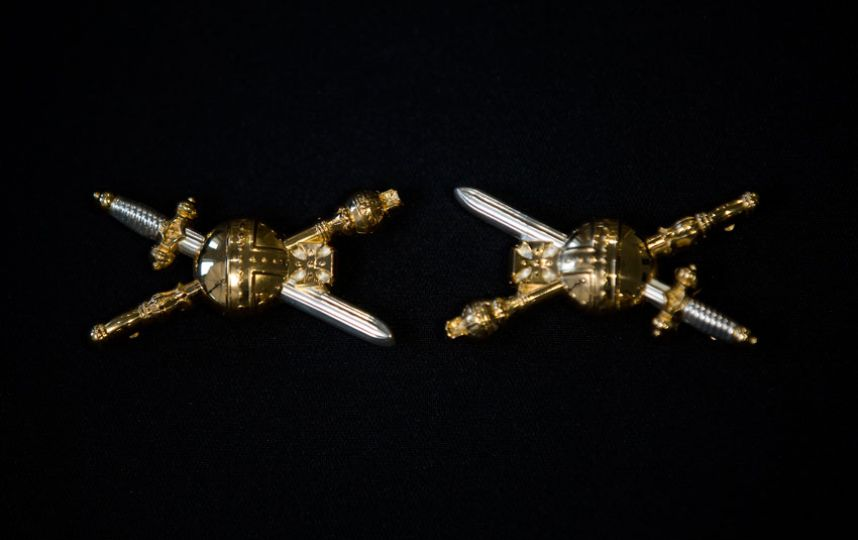
Royal insignia

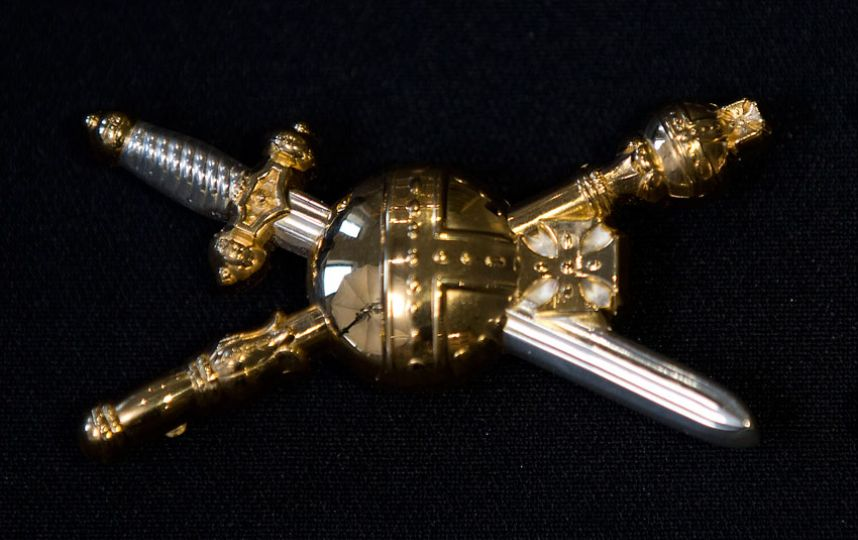
Royal insignia
