= Military ranks of the Netherlands armed forces =

The Military ranks of the Netherlands Armed Forces are the military insignia used by the Netherlands Armed Forces.

== Current ranks ==
Officer ranks

NATO code	OF-10	OF-9	OF-8	OF-7	OF-6	OF-5	OF-4	OF-3	OF-2	OF-1
Royal Netherlands Army
Royal Netherlands Army		Generaal	Luitenant-generaal	Generaal-majoor	Brigadegeneraal	Kolonel	Luitenant-kolonel	Majoor	Kapitein/ Ritmeester	Eerste luitenant	Tweede luitenant
Royal Netherlands Navy
Royal Netherlands Navy		Luitenant-Admiraal	Vice-Admiraal	Schout-bij-Nacht	Commandeur	Kapitein ter zee	Kapitein-luitenant ter zee	Luitenant ter zee der 1^{ste} klasse	Luitenant ter zee der 2^{de} klasse oudste categorie	Luitenant ter zee der 2^{de} klasse	Luitenant ter zee der 3^{de} klasse
Netherlands Marine Corps
Netherlands Marine Corps		Generaal	Luitenant-generaal	Generaal-majoor	Brigade-generaal	Kolonel	Luitenant-kolonel	Majoor	Kapitein	1e Luitenant	2e Luitenant
Royal Netherlands Air and Space Force
Royal Netherlands Air and Space Force		Generaal	Luitenant-generaal	Generaal-majoor	Commodore	Kolonel	Luitenant-kolonel	Majoor	Kapitein	Eerste luitenant	Tweede luitenant
Royal Marechaussee
Royal Marechaussee			Luitenant-generaal	Generaal-majoor	Brigade-generaal	Kolonel	Luitenant-kolonel	Majoor	Kapitein	Eerste-luitenant	Tweede-luitenant
NATO code	OF-10	OF-9	OF-8	OF-7	OF-6	OF-5	OF-4	OF-3	OF-2	OF-1

Enlisted ranks

NATO code	OR-9	OR-8	OR-7	OR-6	OR-5	OR-4	OR-3	OR-2		OR-1
Royal Netherlands Army
Infantry ranks	Adjudant-onderofficier		Sergeant-majoor	Sergeant der 1e klasse	Sergeant	Korporaal der 1e klasse	Korporaal	Soldaat der 1e klasse	Soldaat der 2e klasse	Soldaat der 3e klasse
Artillery ranks	Adjudant-onderofficier		Opperwachtmeester	Wachtmeester der 1e klasse	Wachtmeester	Korporaal der 1e klasse	Korporaal	Kanonier der 1e klasse	Kanonier der 2e klasse	Kanonier der 3e klasse
Royal Netherlands Army
Cavalry ranks	Adjudant-onderofficier		Opperwachtmeester	Wachtmeester der 1e klasse	Wachtmeester	Korporaal der 1e klasse	Korporaal	Huzaar der 1e klasse	Huzaar der 2e klasse	Huzaar der 3e klasse
Administration ranks	Adjudant-onderofficier		Sergeant-majoor	Sergeant der 1e klasse	Sergeant	Korporaal der 1e klasse	Korporaal	Soldaat der 1e klasse	Soldaat der 2e klasse	Soldaat der 3e klasse
NATO code	OR-9	OR-8	OR-7	OR-6	OR-5	OR-4	OR-3	OR-2		OR-1
Royal Netherlands Navy										No insignia
Royal Netherlands Navy	Adjudant-onderofficier/ Opperschipper		Sergeant-majoor/ Schipper	Sergeant/ Bootsman		Korporaal/ Kwartiermeester		Matroos der 1e klasse	Matroos der 2e klasse	Matroos der 3e klasse
Netherlands Marine Corps										No insignia
Netherlands Marine Corps	Adjudant-onderofficier		Sergeant-majoor	Sergeant		Korporaal		Marinier der 1e klasse	Marinier der 2e klasse	Marinier der 3e klasse
Royal Netherlands Air and Space Force
Royal Netherlands Air and Space Force	Adjudant-onderofficier		Sergeant-majoor	Sergeant der 1e klasse	Sergeant	Korporaal der 1e klasse	Korporaal	Soldaat der 1ste klasse	Soldaat der 2de klasse	Soldaat der 3de klasse
Royal Marechaussee
Royal Marechaussee	Adjudant-onderofficier		Opperwachtmeester	Wachtmeester der 1e klasse	Wachtmeester	Marechaussee der 1e klasse	Marechaussee der 2e klasse	Marechaussee der 3e klasse		Marechaussee der 4e klasse
NATO code	OR-9	OR-8	OR-7	OR-6	OR-5	OR-4	OR-3	OR-2		OR-1

In 2003 the appointments of Stafadjudant-onderofficier were introduced.

Rank group	Senior NCO
Royal Netherlands Army
Royal Netherlands Army	Stafadjudant-onderofficier (Landmachtadjudant)	Stafadjudant-onderofficier (Brigadeadjudant)	Stafadjudant-onderofficier (Bataljonsadjudant)

The Dutch titles for privates are:

	Name
Infantry	Soldaat, Stoter, Grenadier, Jager, Fusilier, Commando, Pontonnier
Cavalry	Huzaar
Artillery	Kannonier, Rijder

== Cadet ranks at the Royal Military Academy and Royal Naval College ==
NATO code	OF(D)	Student officer
NATO code	OF(D)	OR-5	OR-4	OR-3	OR-1
	5th year	4th year	3rd year	2nd year	1st year
Royal Netherlands Army
Royal Netherlands Army	Vaandrig/Kornet	Sergeant/ Wachtmeester	Korporaal der 1e klasse	Korporaal	Soldaat/ Huzaar/ Kanonier der 3e klasse
Royal Netherlands Air and Space Force
Royal Netherlands Air and Space Force	Vaandrig	Sergeant	Korporaal der 1e klasse	Korporaal	Soldaat der 3de klasse
Royal Netherlands Navy & Netherlands Marine Corps
Royal Netherlands Navy & Netherlands Marine Corps		Sergeant-Adelborst	Korporaal-Adelborst	Adelborst der 1e klasse	Adelborst
Royal Marechaussee
Royal Marechaussee	Kornet	Cadet Wachtmeester	Cadet Marechaussee der 1e klasse	Cadet Marechaussee der 2e klasse	Cadet Marechaussee der 4e klasse

== Overseas forces ==
Officer ranks

NATO code	OF-10	OF-9	OF-8	OF-7	OF-6	OF-5	OF-4	OF-3	OF-2	OF-1
Vrijwilligers Korps; Curaçao
Vrijwilligers Korps; Curaçao						Kolonel	Luitenant-kolonel	Majoor	Kapitein	1e Luitenant	2e Luitenant
Vrijwilligers Korps; Sint Maarten
Vrijwilligers Korps; Sint Maarten						Kolonel	Luitenant-kolonel	Majoor	Kapitein	1e Luitenant	2e Luitenant

Student officers

NATO code	OF(D)
Vrijwilligers Korps; Curaçao
Vrijwilligers Korps; Curaçao	Vaandrig
Vrijwilligers Korps; Sint Maarten
Vrijwilligers Korps; Sint Maarten	Vaandrig

Enlisted ranks

NATO code	OR-9	OR-8	OR-7	OR-6	OR-5	OR-4	OR-3	OR-2		OR-1
Vrijwilligers Korps; Curaçao
Vrijwilligers Korps; Curaçao	Staf adjudant onderofficier	Adjudant onderofficer	Sergeant-majoor	Sergeant		Korporaal		Soldaat 1ste klas	Soldaat 2de klas	Soldaat
Vrijwilligers Korps; Sint Maarten
Vrijwilligers Korps; Sint Maarten	Staf adjudant onderofficier	Adjudant onderofficer	Sergeant-majoor	Sergeant		Korporaal		Soldaat 1ste klas	Soldaat 2de klas	Soldaat

== Royal insignia ==
In 2013, the King of the Netherlands was given special insignia (Note: Since 1983 the Dutch constitution article 97 names the government as a whole as commander in chief of the armed forces instead of a single individual. The monarch as head of state is part of the government, and holds no military ranks as individual) showing the regalia orb, scepter and sword for army and navy. Although it indicates no rank, it shows his lasting connection to the armed forces.

Rank group	the Monarch
Royal Netherlands Army
Royal Netherlands Navy
Royal Netherlands Air and Space Force

== Historic ranks ==
=== Royal Netherlands Army ===
Officer ranks

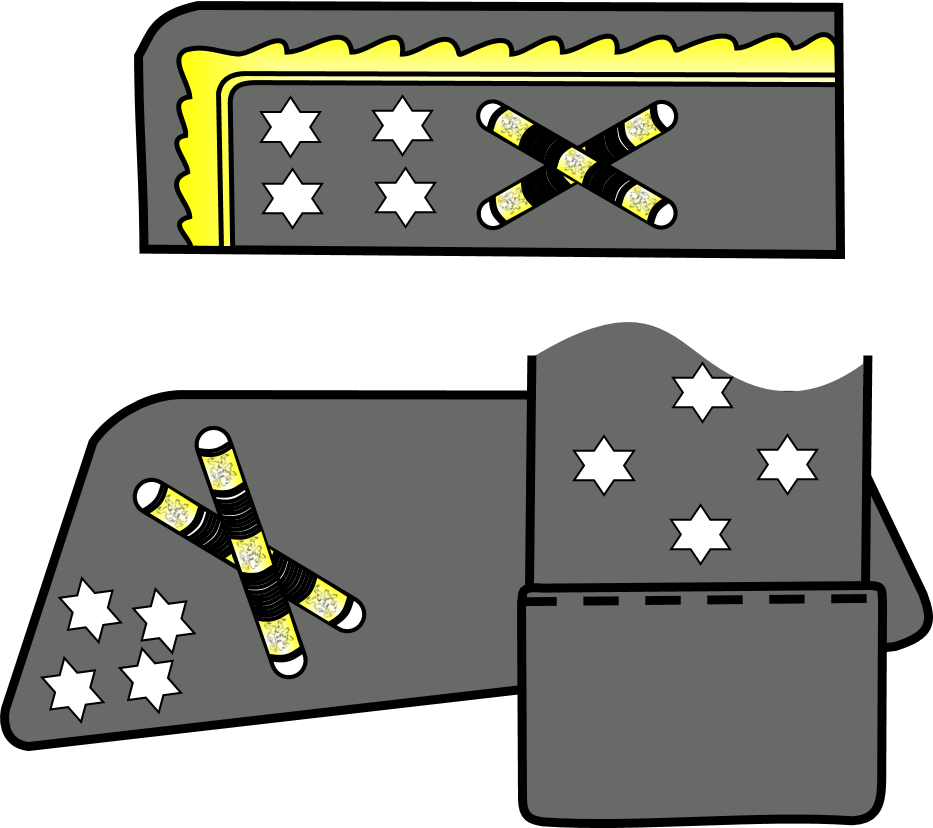
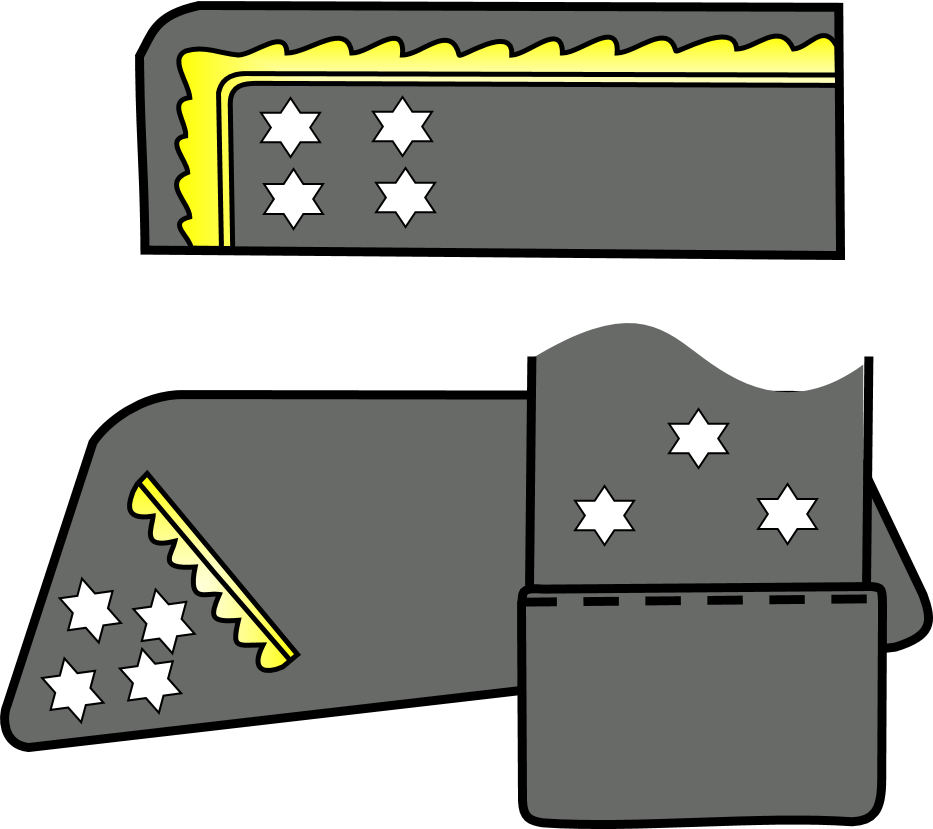
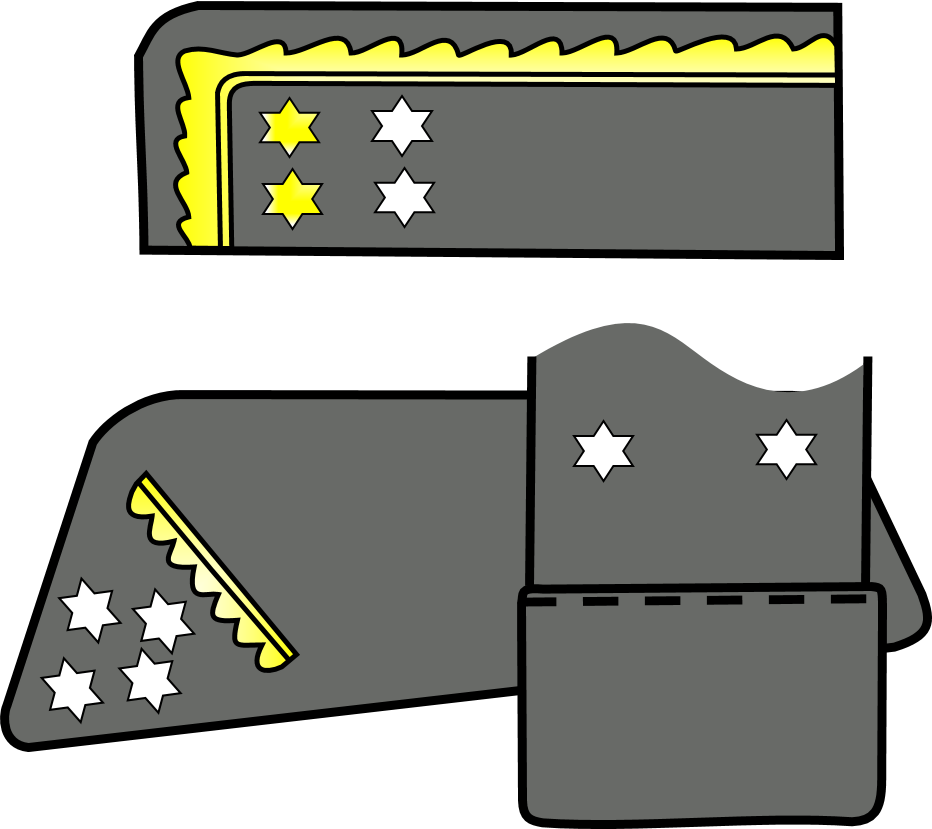
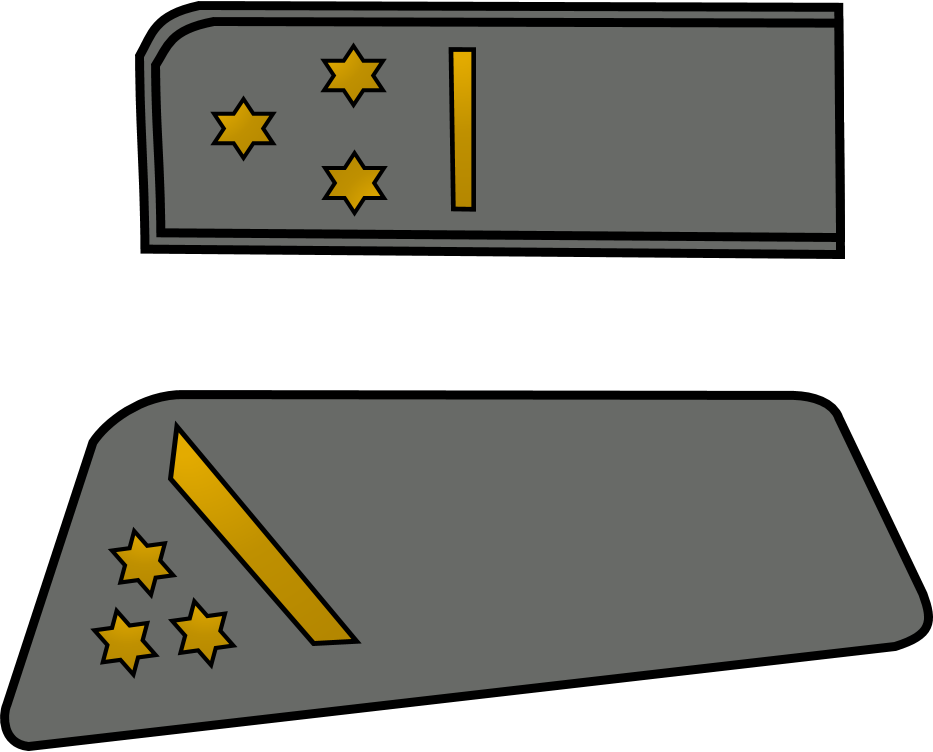
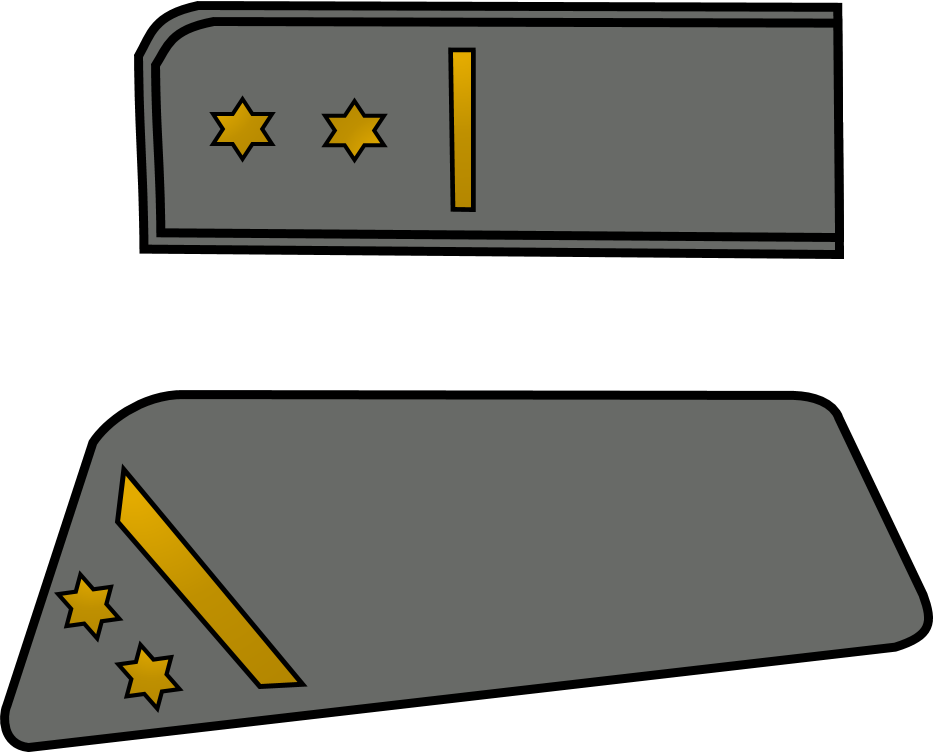
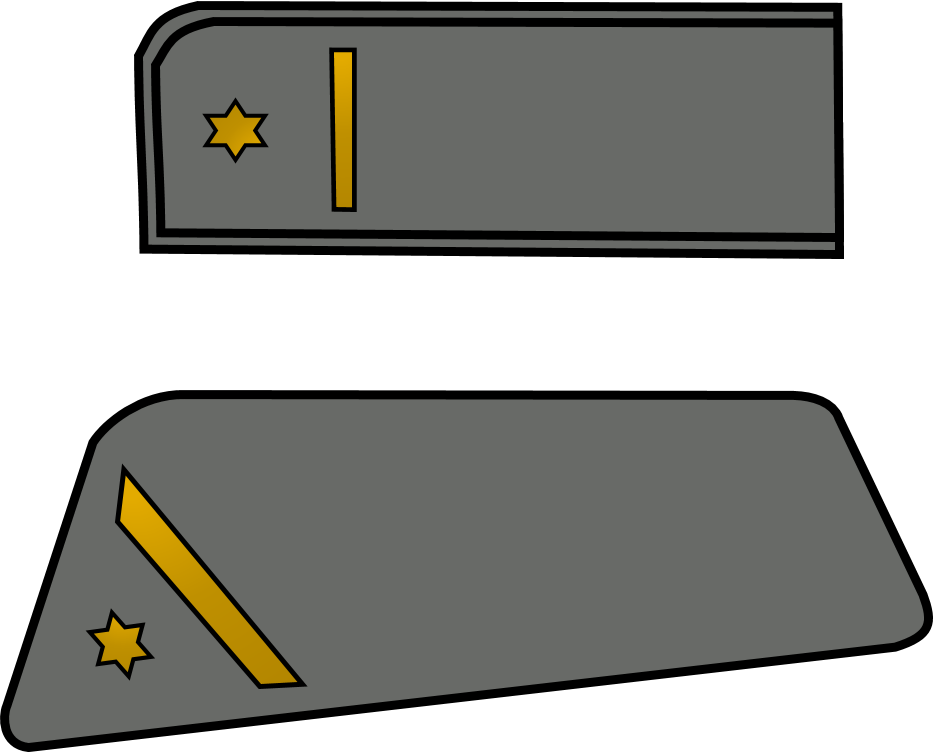
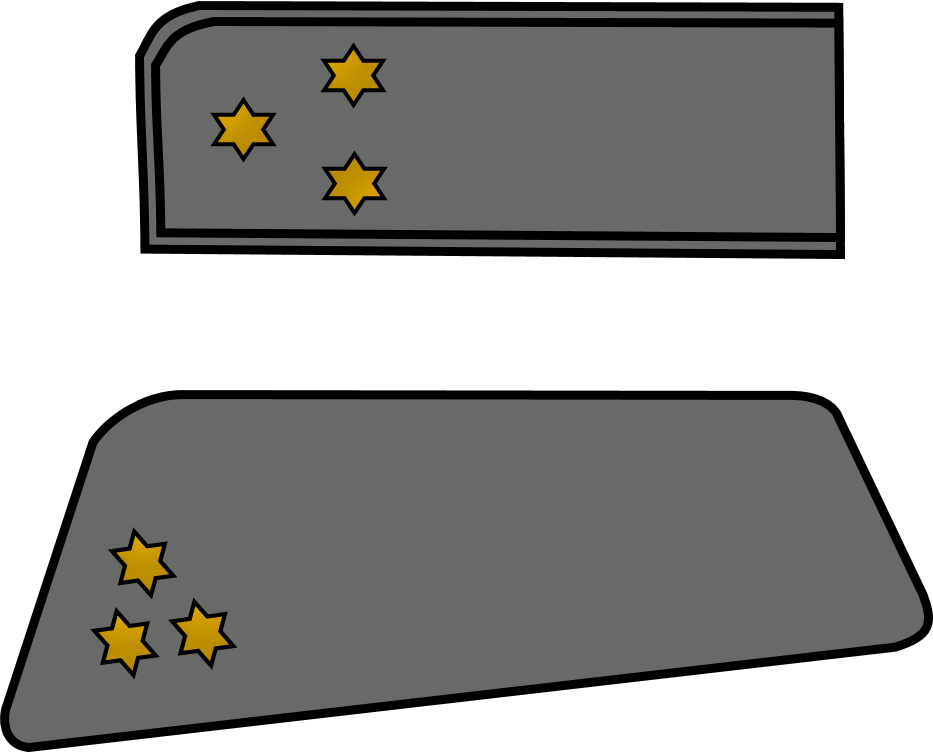
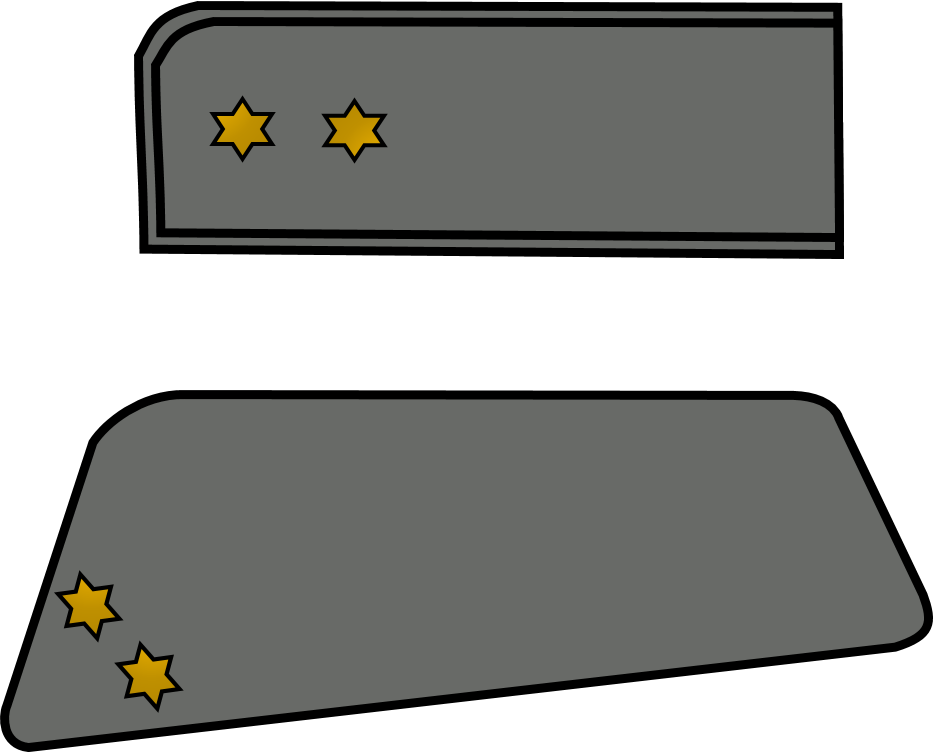
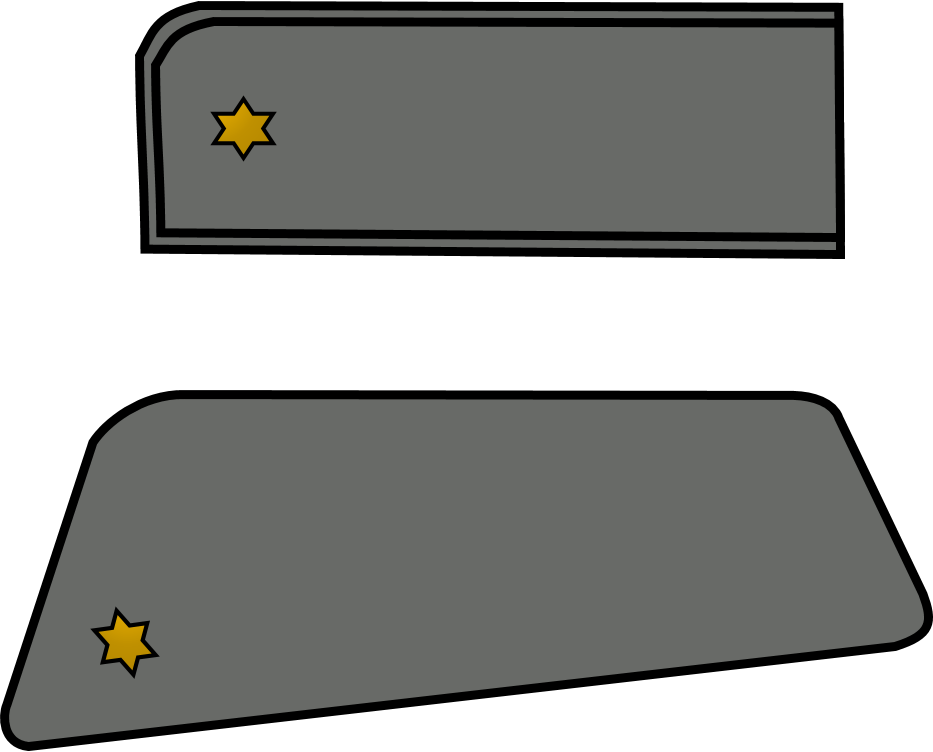
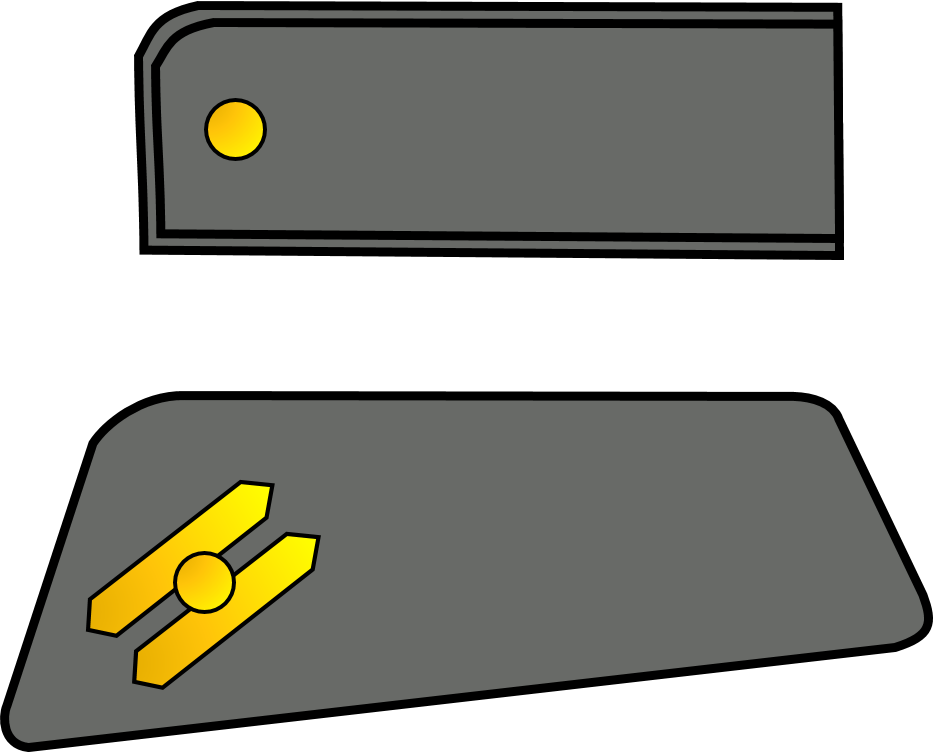
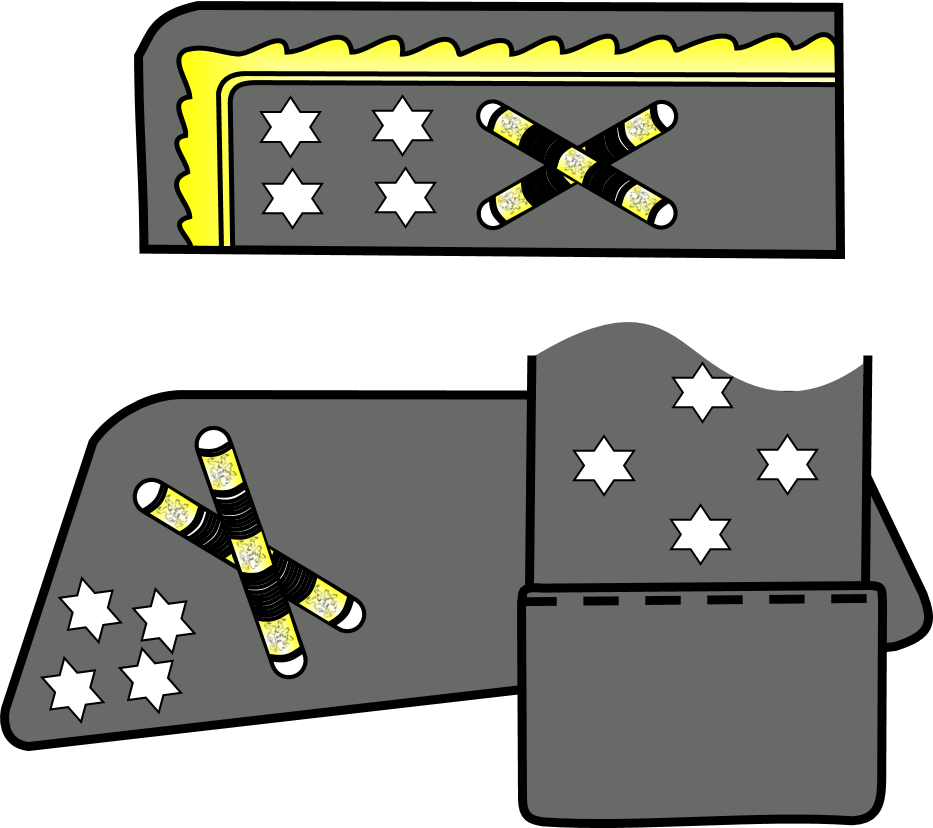
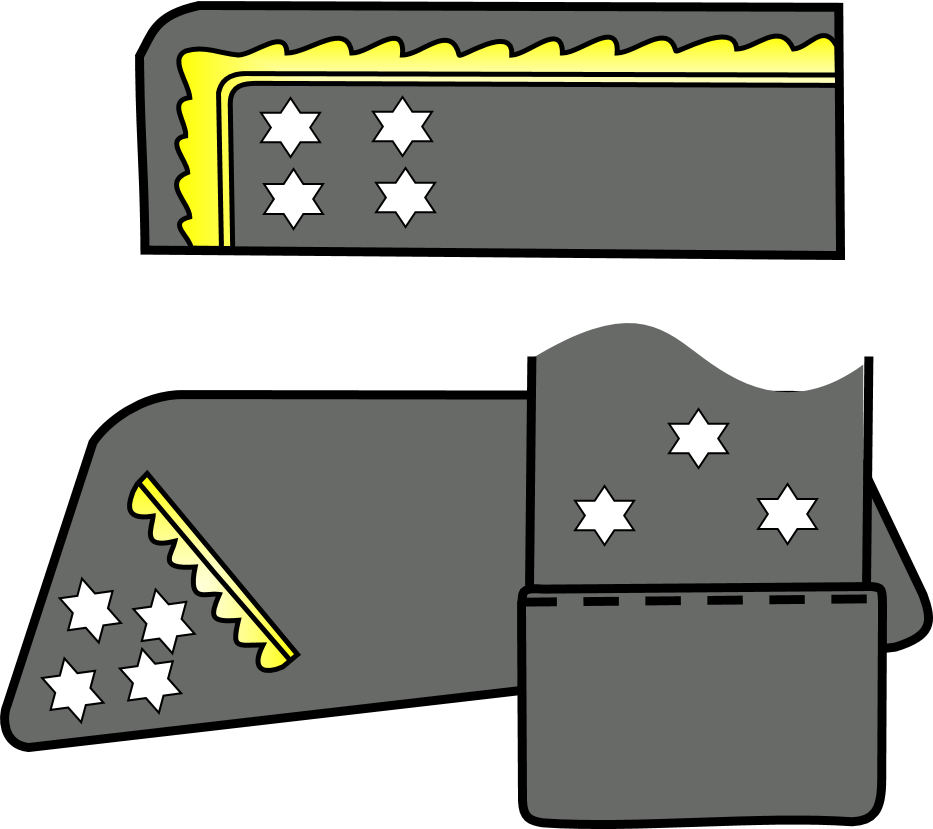
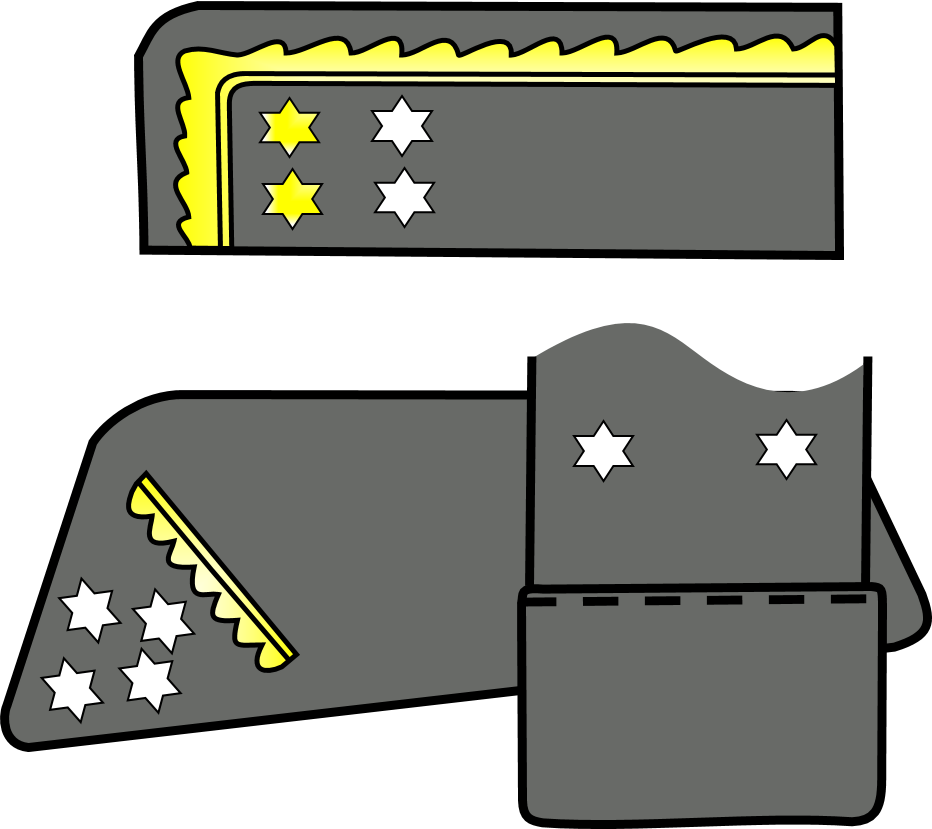
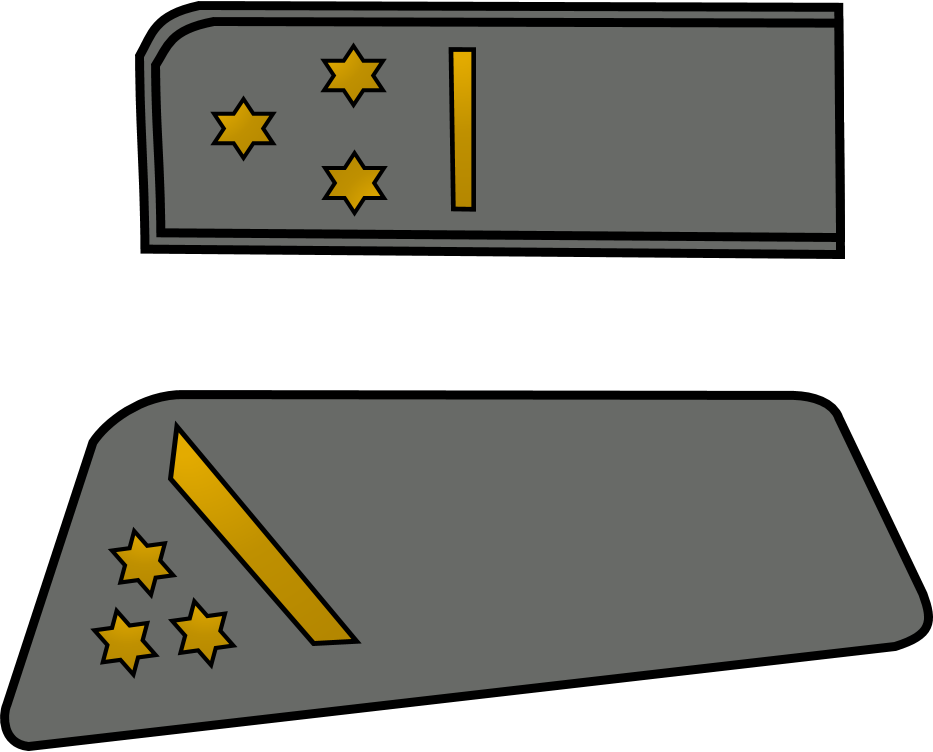
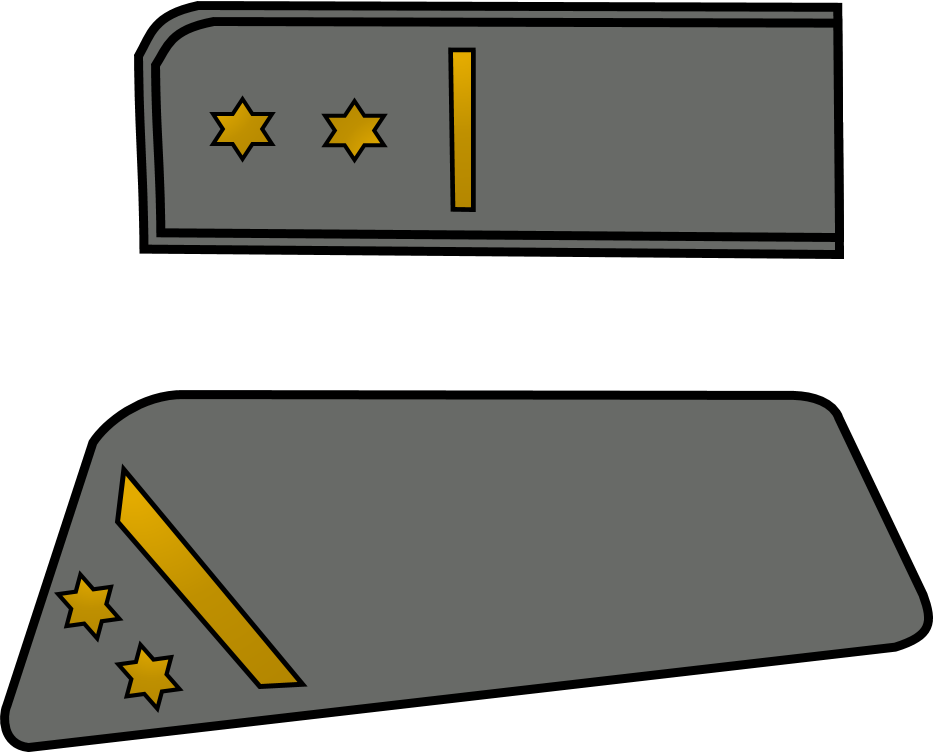
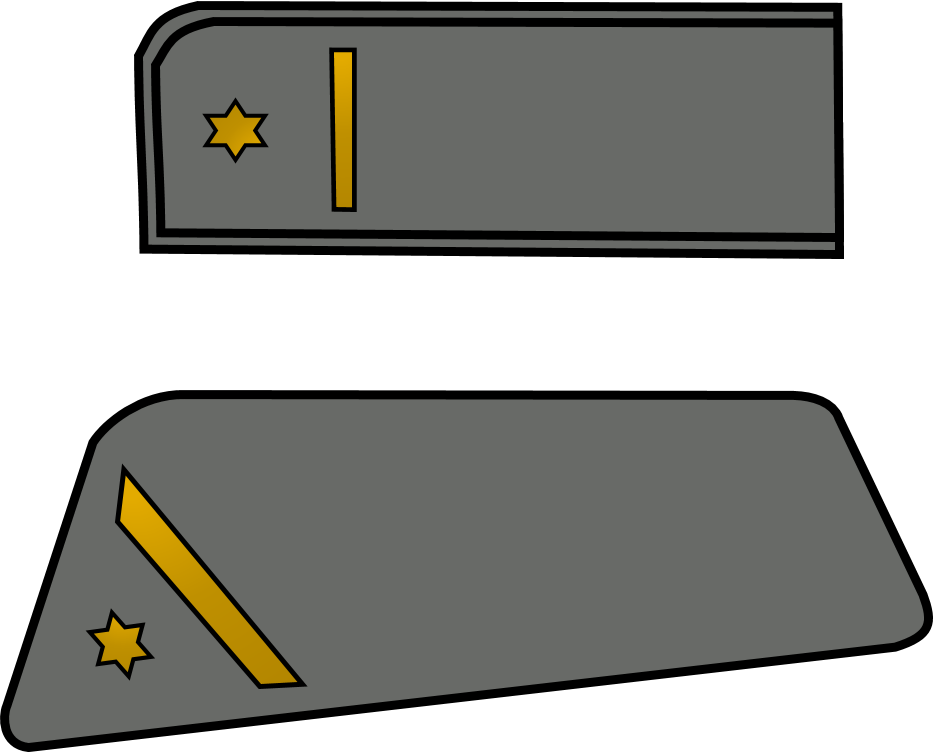
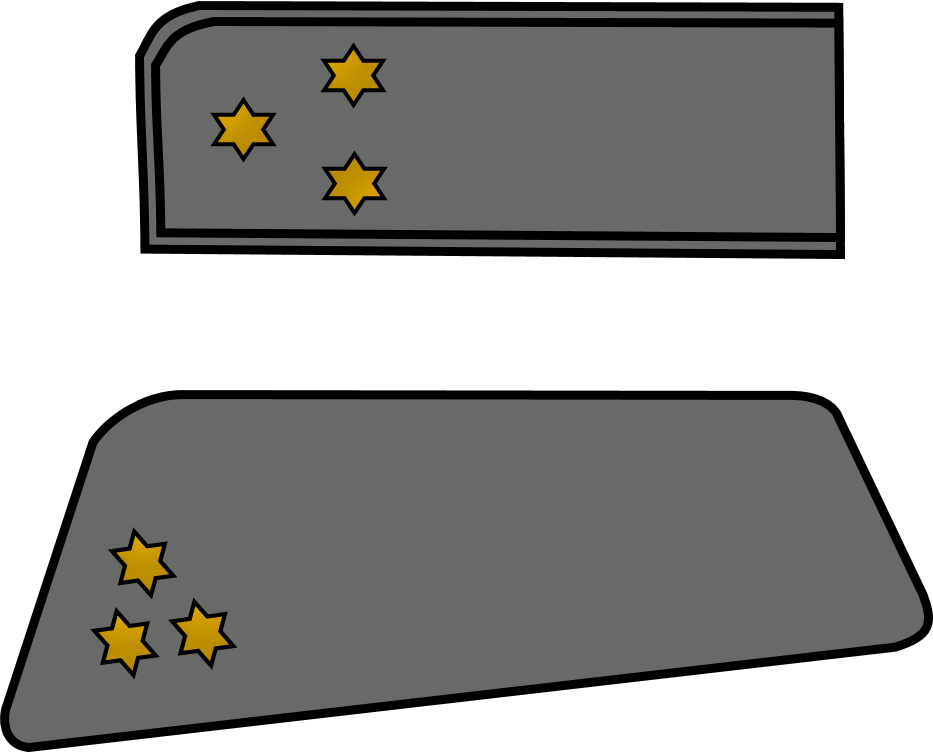
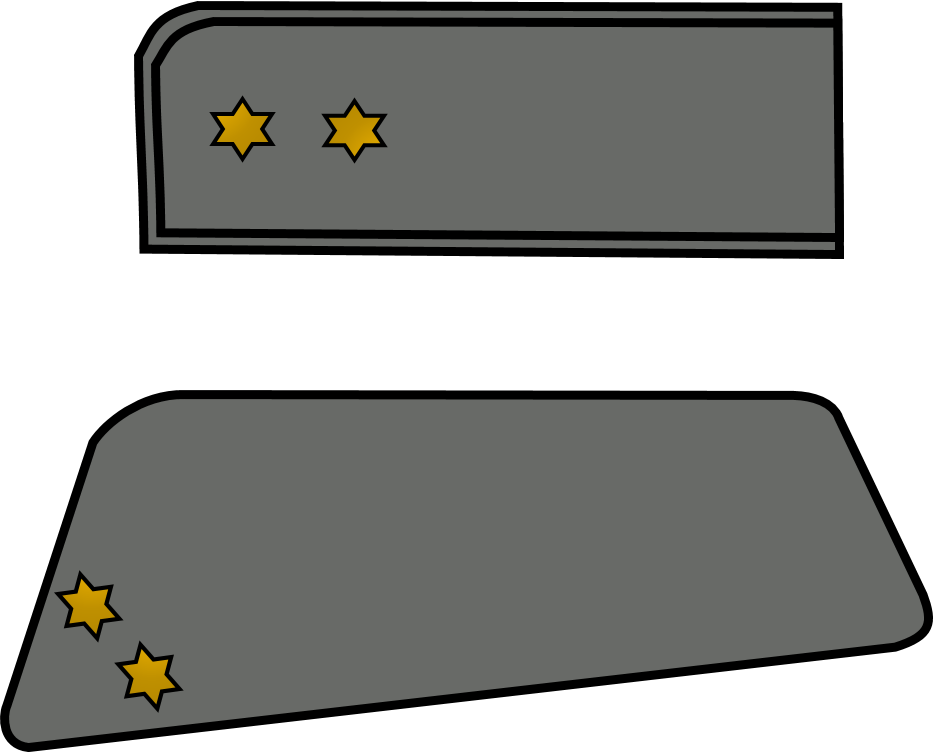
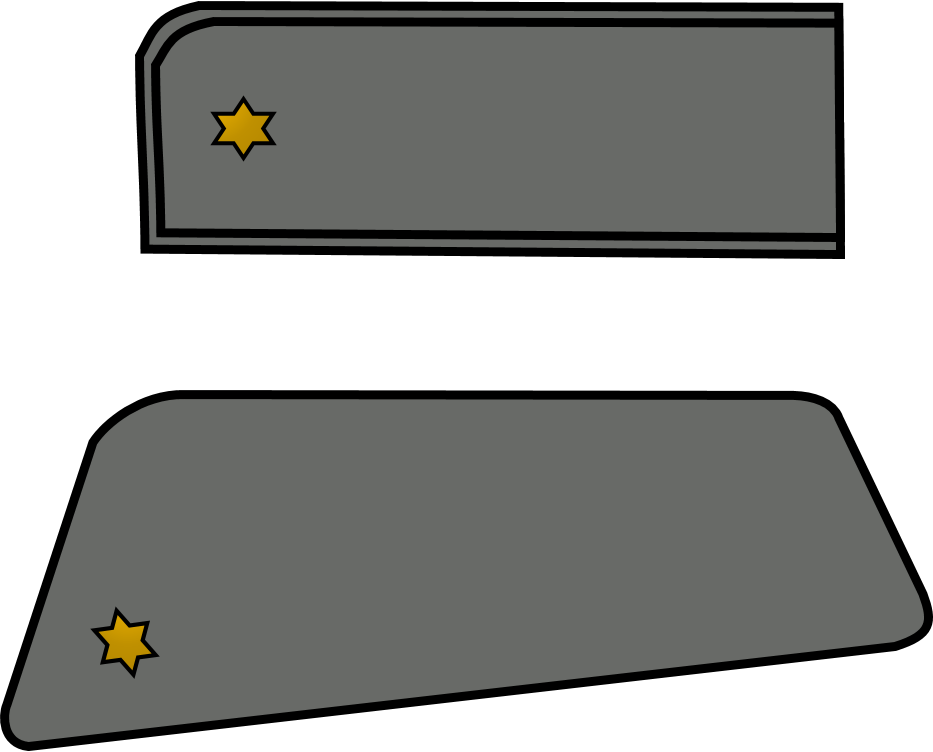
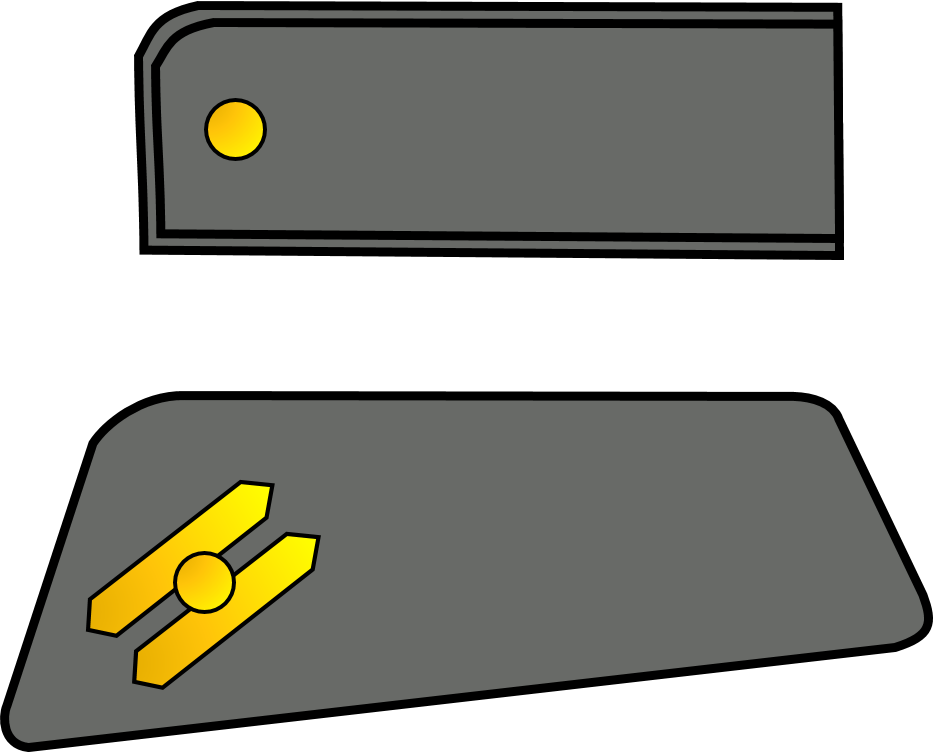
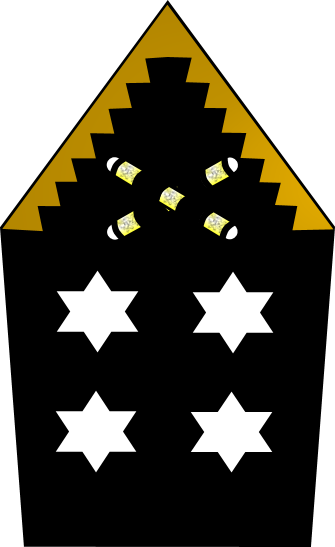
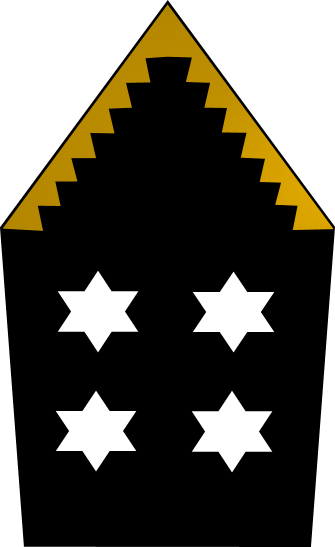
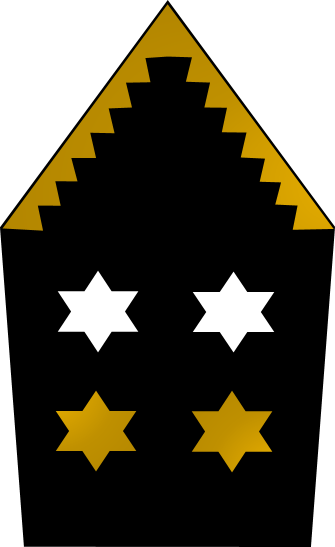
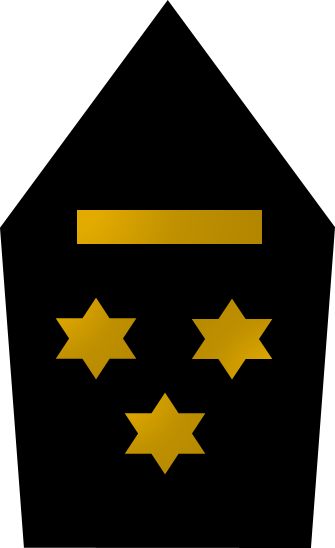
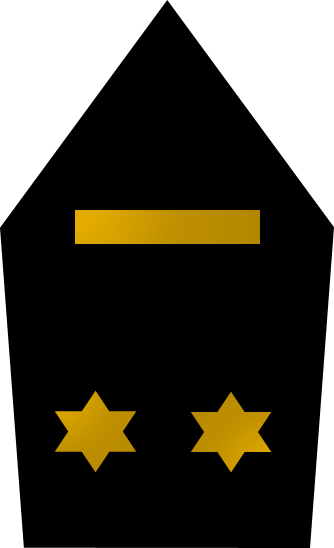
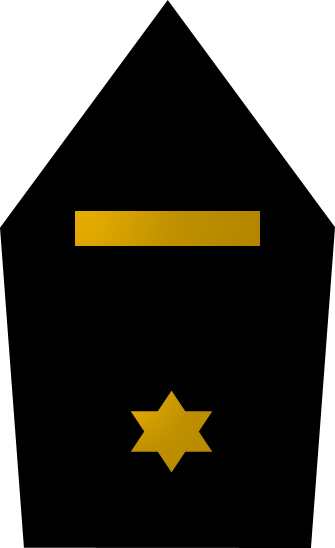
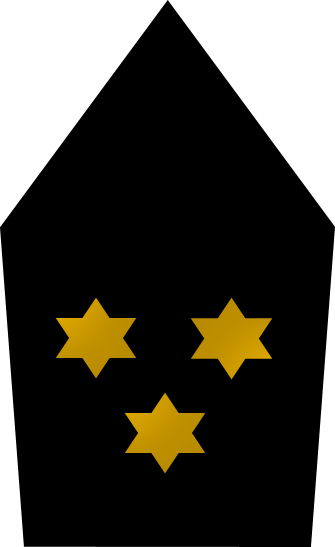
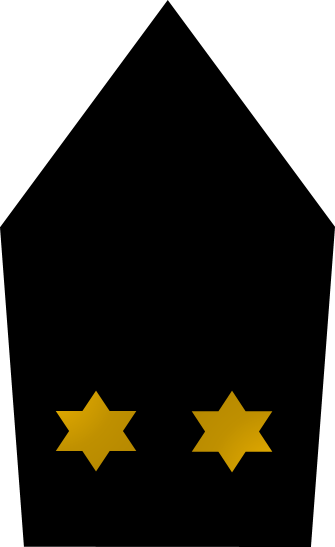
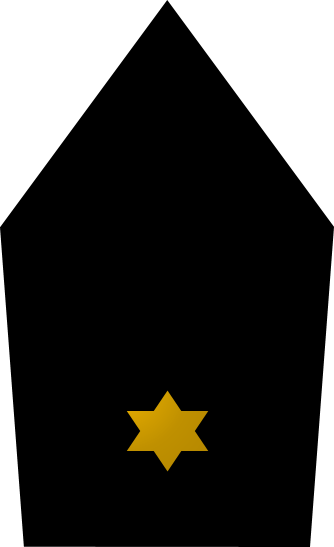
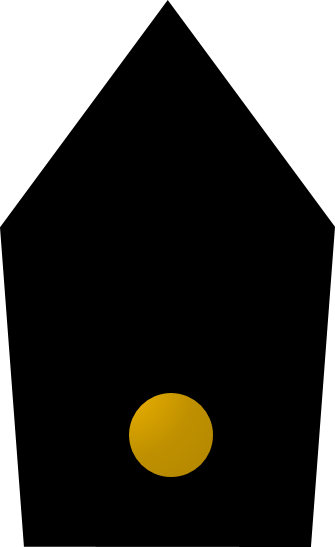
Rank group	General / flag officers				Senior officers			Junior officers
Royal Netherlands Army; 1856–1914
Royal Netherlands Army; 1856–1914	(Veld)Maarschalk	Generaal	Luitenant-generaal	Generaal-majoor	Kolonel	Overste/Luitenant-kolonel	Majoor	Kapitein/Ritmeester	1e Luitenant		2e Luitenant	Vaandrig/Kornet
Royal Netherlands Army; 1914–1940
Royal Netherlands Army; 1914–1940		Generaal	Luitenant-generaal	Generaal-majoor	Kolonel	Overste/Luitenant-kolonel	Majoor	Kapitein/Ritmeester	1e Luitenant	2e Luitenant	Kapelmeester	Vaandrig/Kornet
Royal Netherlands Army; 1941–1955
Royal Netherlands Army; 1941–1955		Generaal	Luitenant-generaal	Generaal-majoor	Kolonel	Overste/Luitenant-kolonel	Majoor	Kapitein/Ritmeester	1e Luitenant	2e Luitenant	Kapelmeester	Vaandrig/Kornet
Rank group	General / flag officers				Senior officers			Junior officers

Enlisted ranks

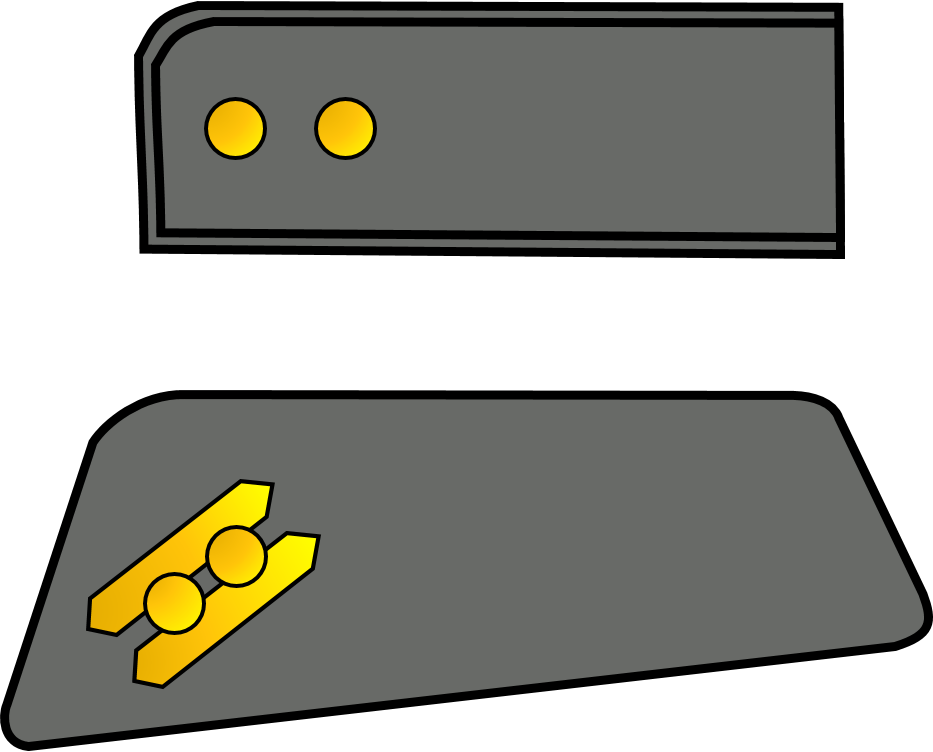
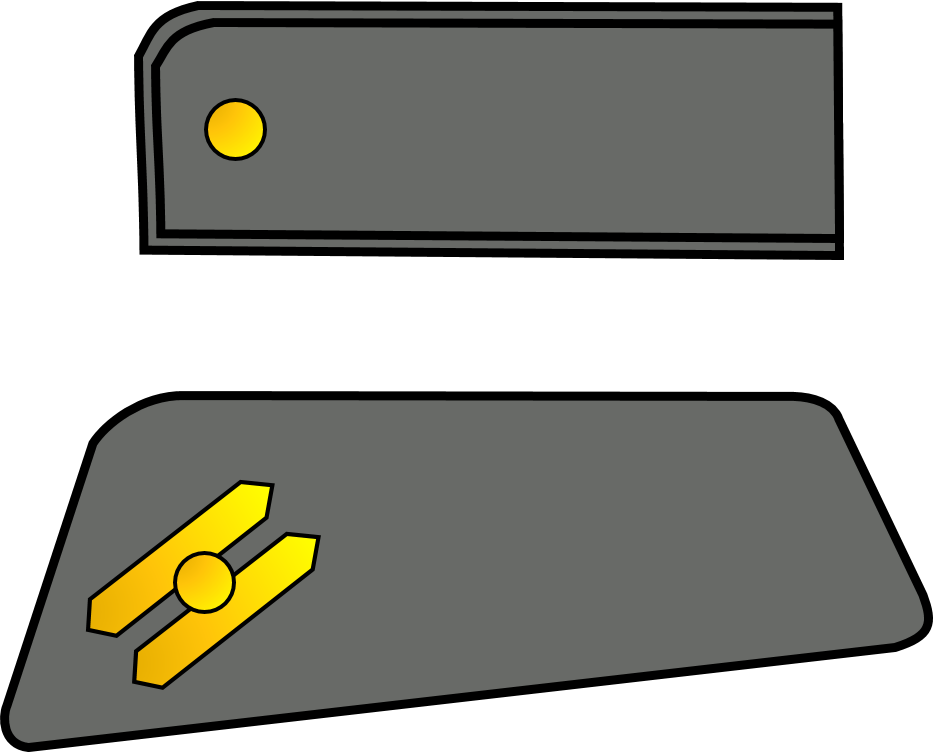
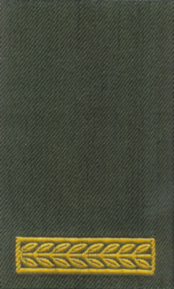
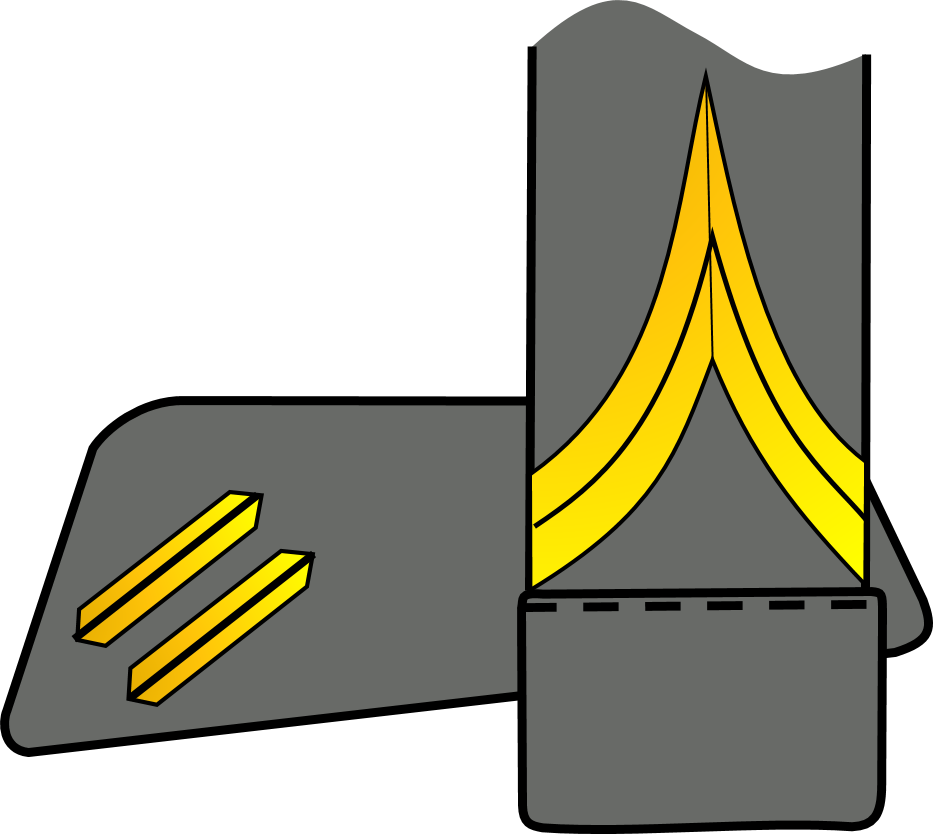
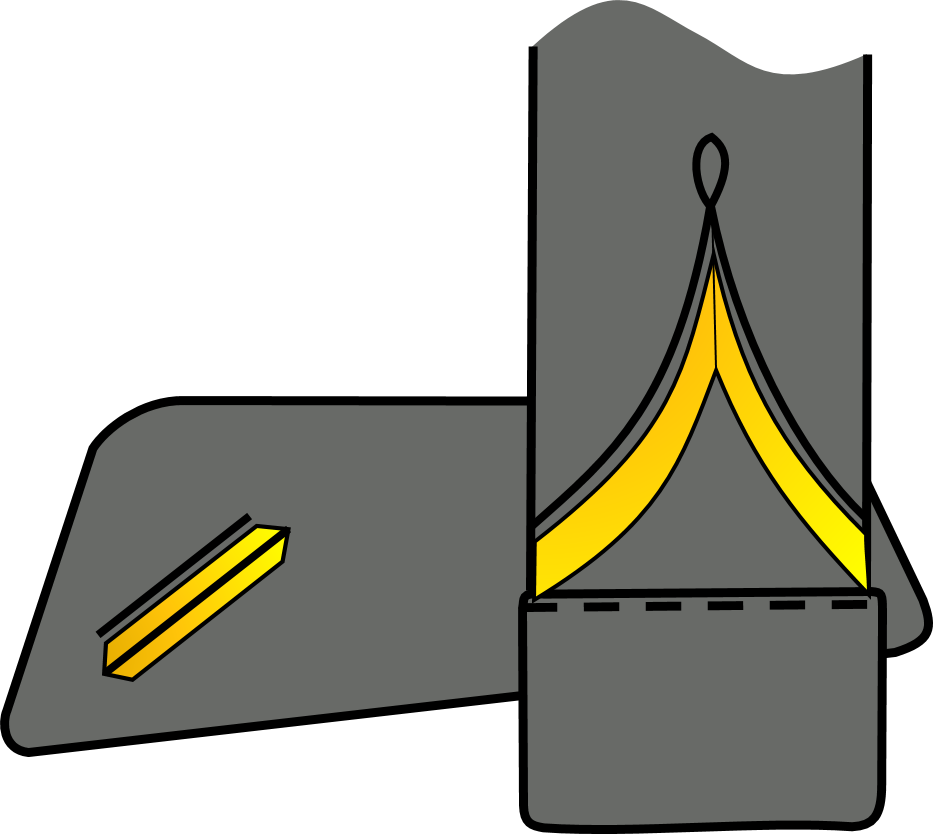
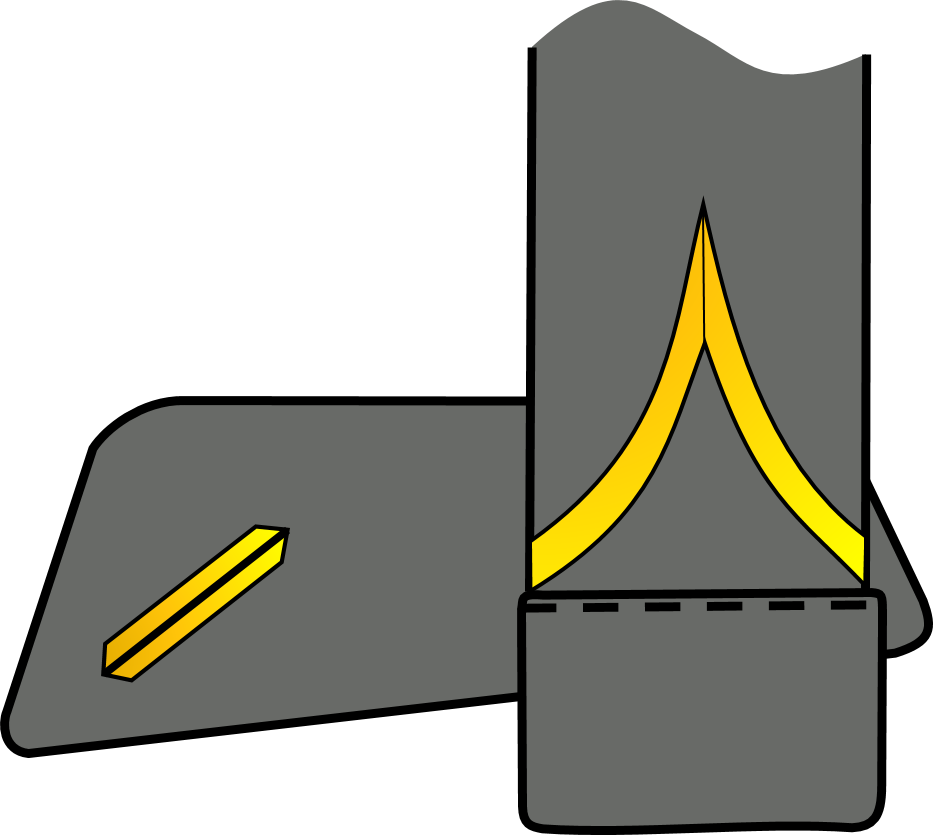
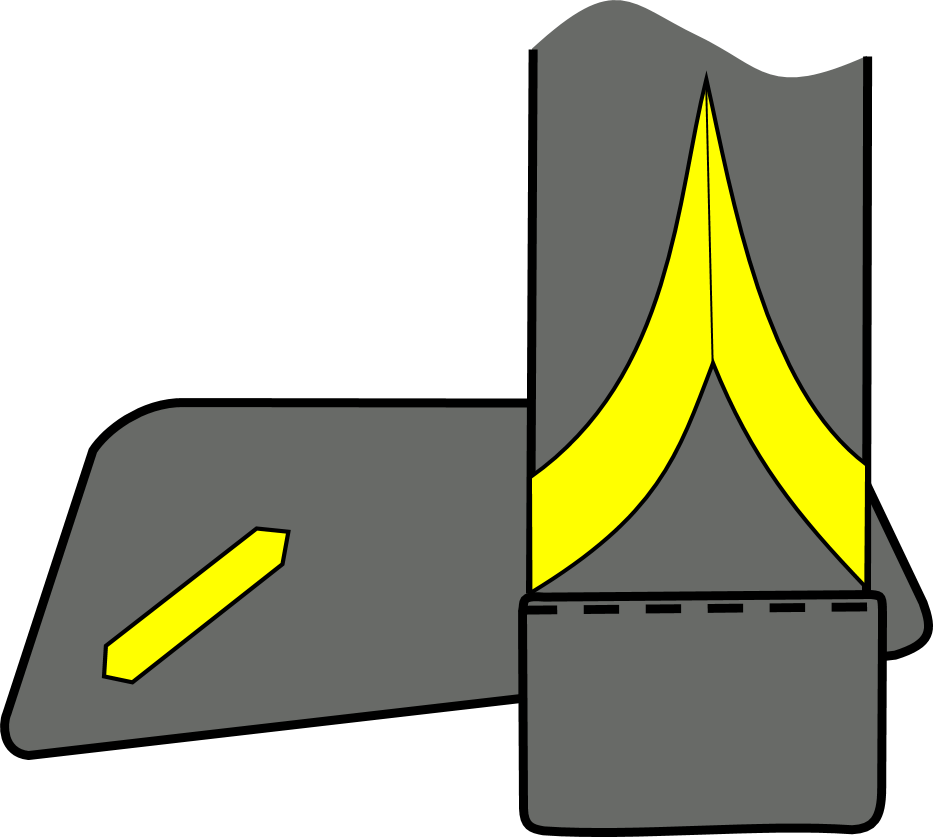
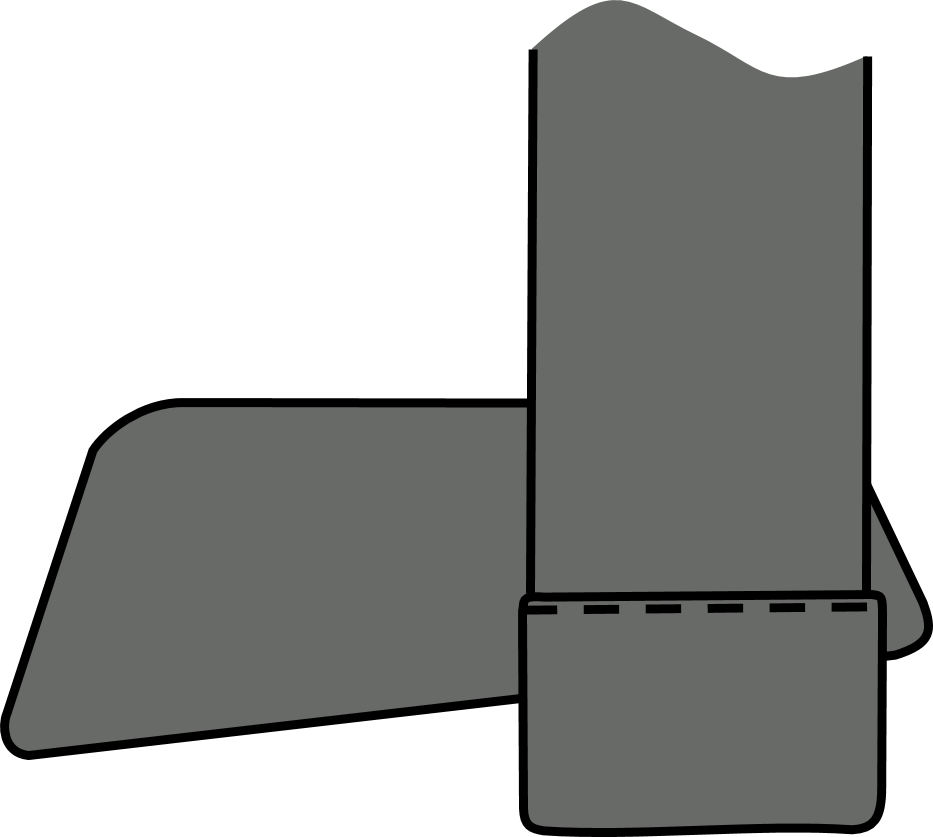
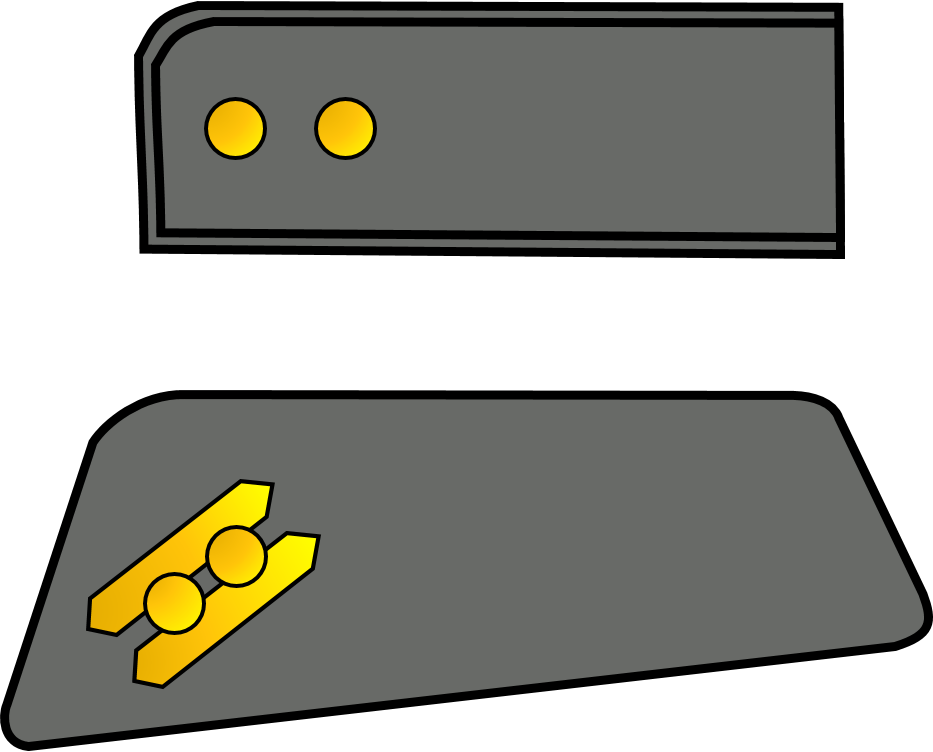
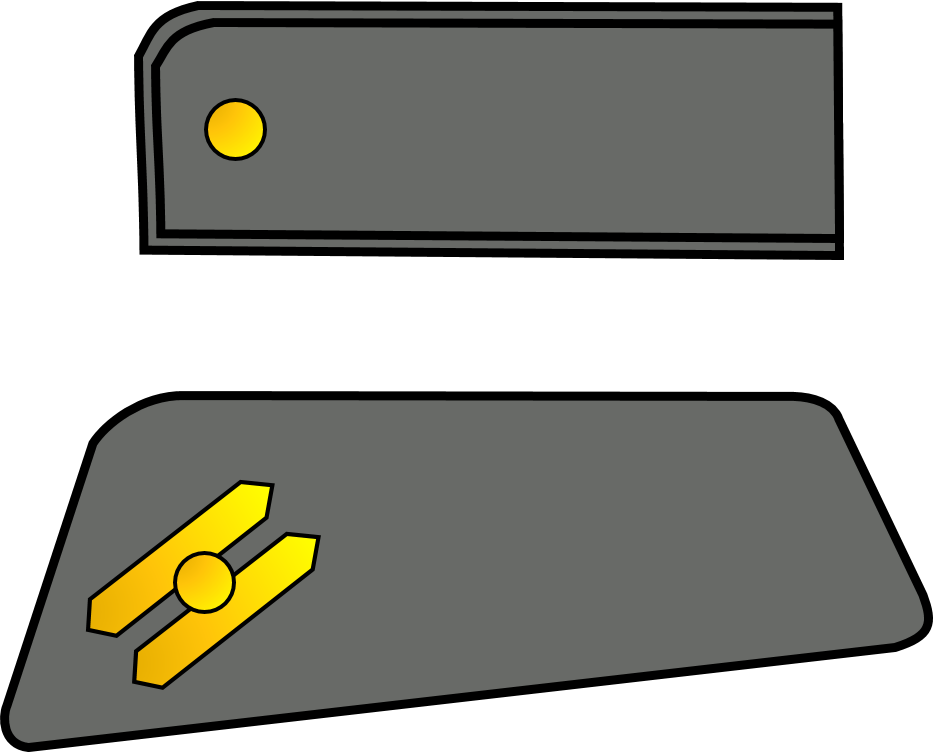
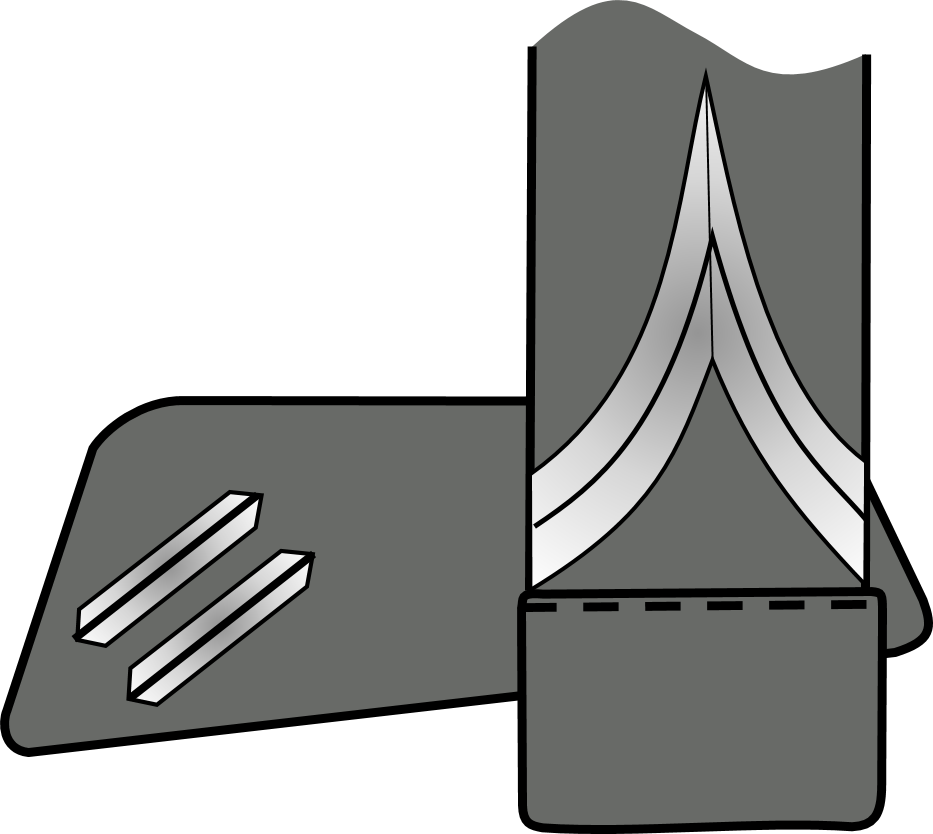
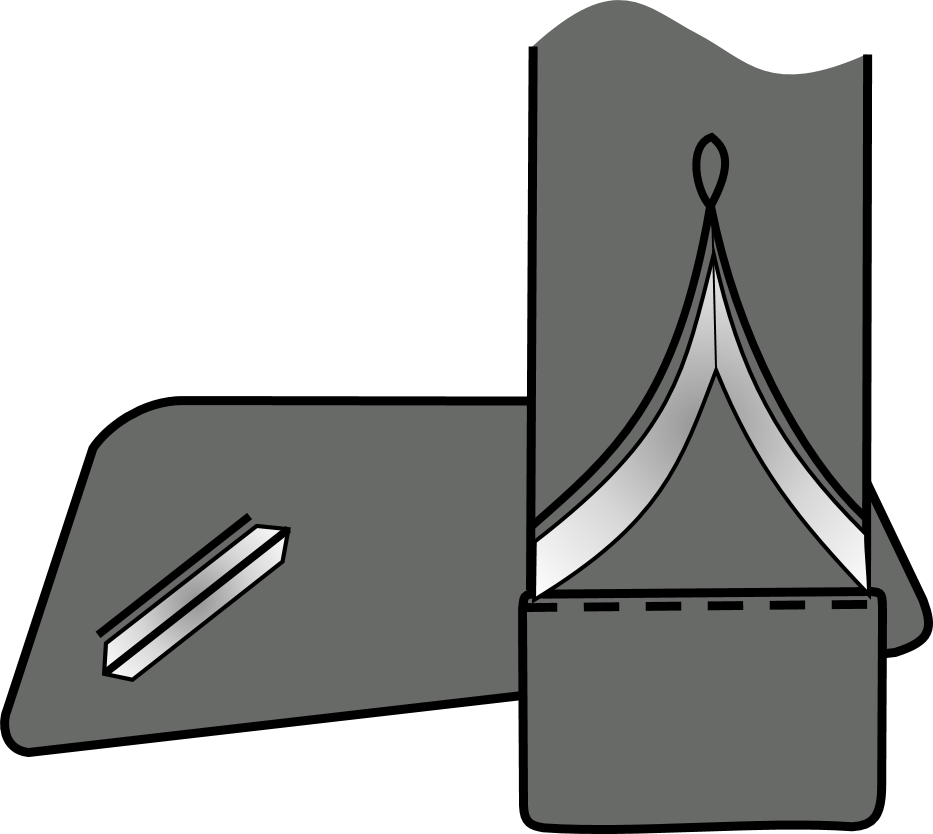
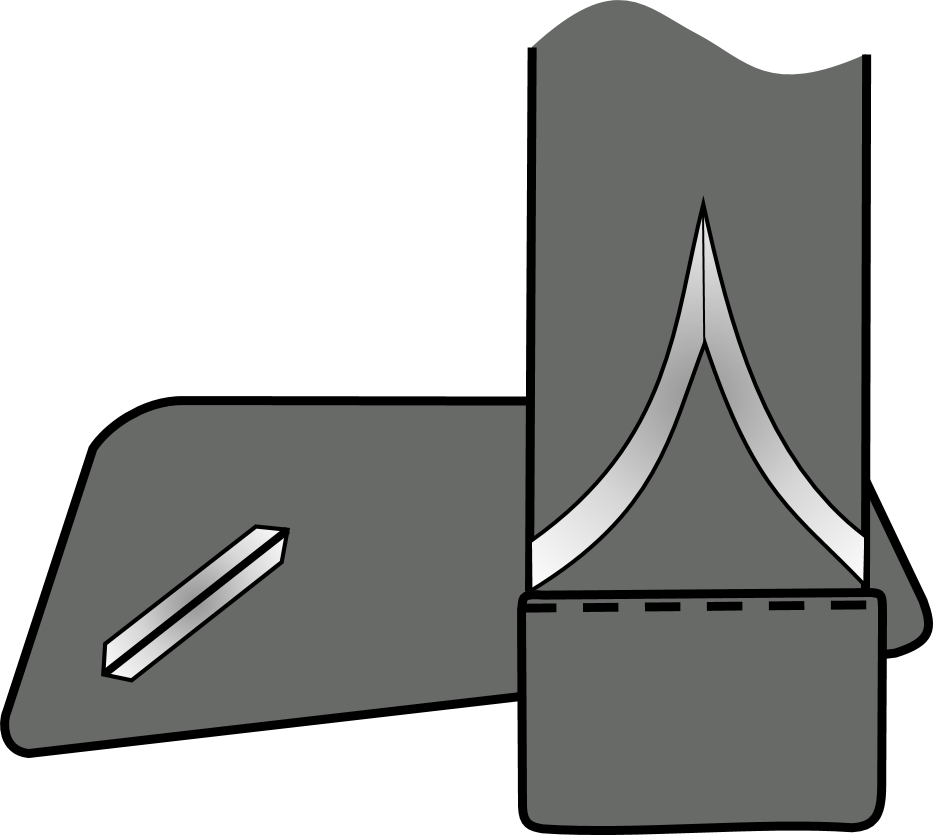
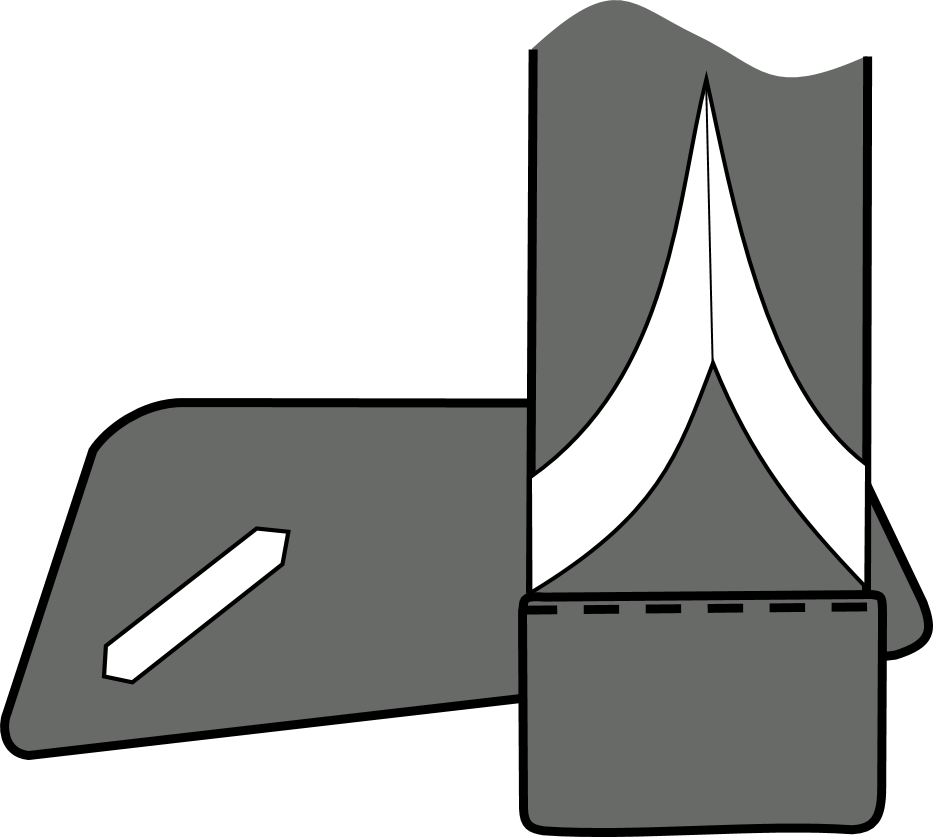
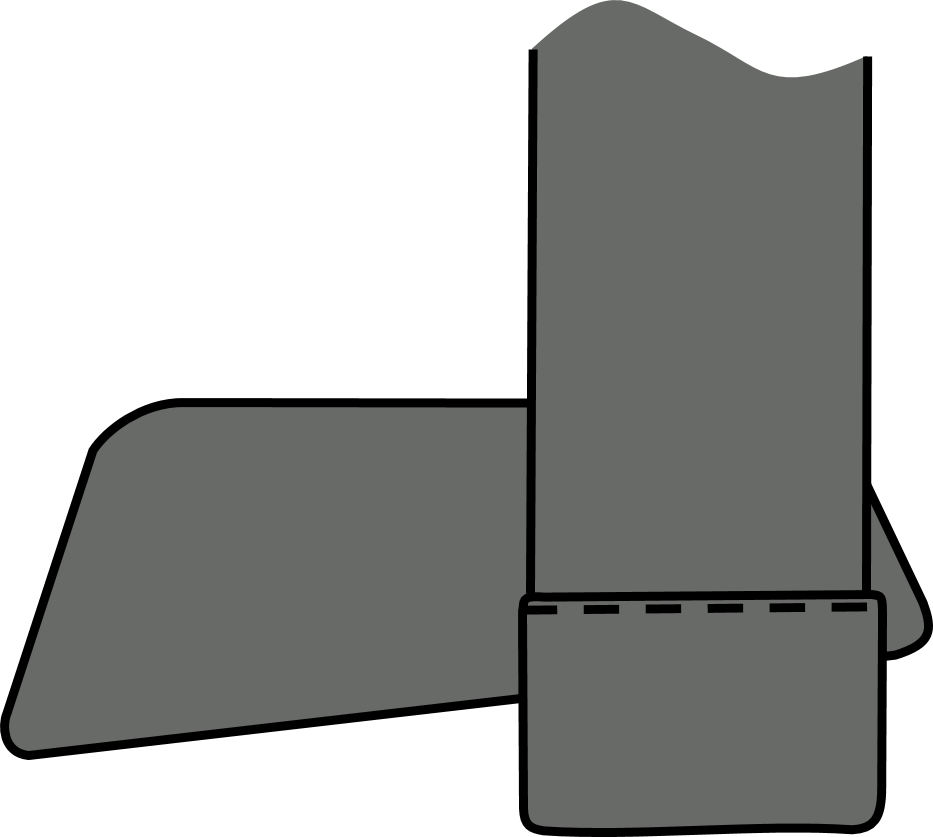
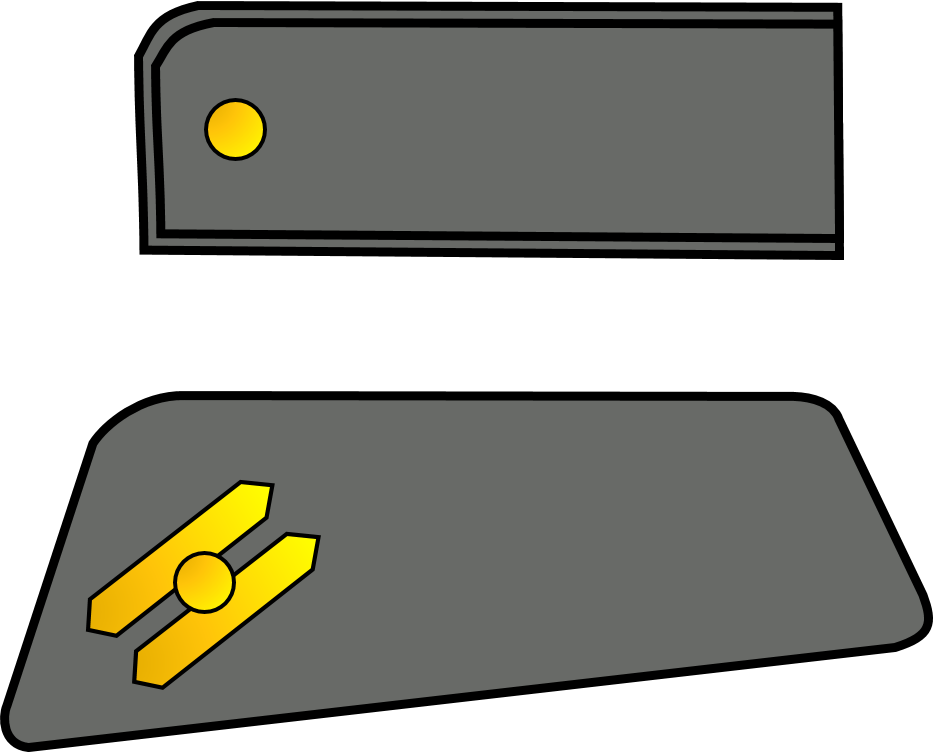
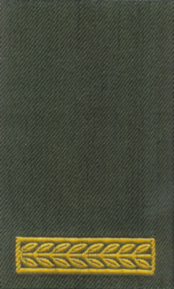
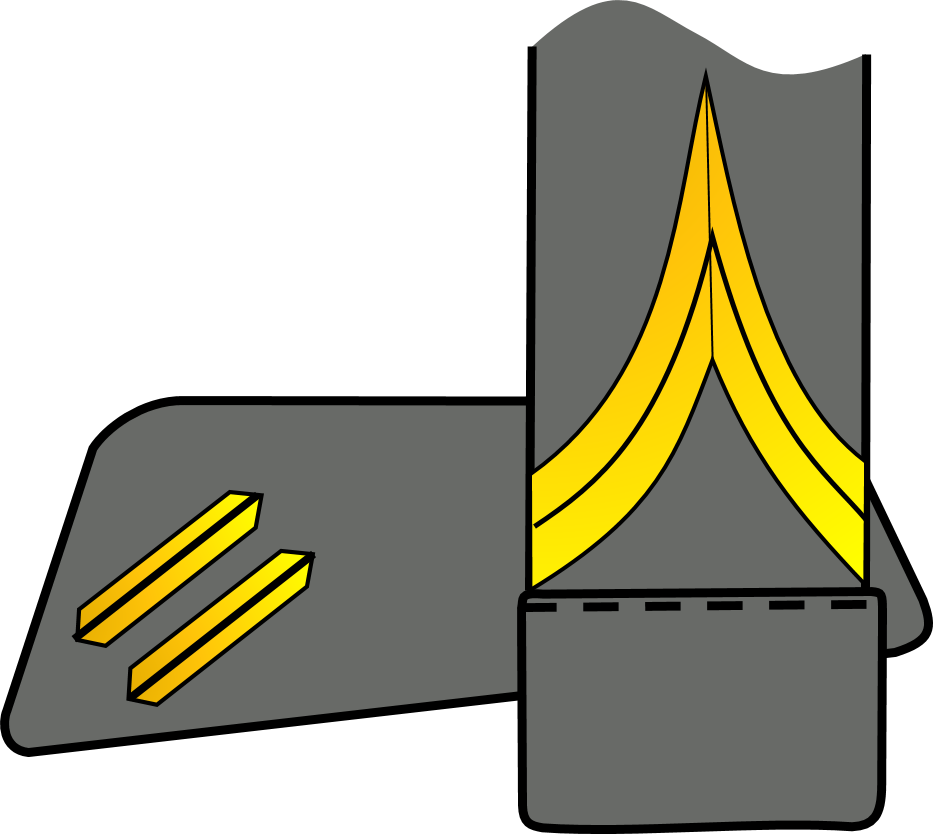
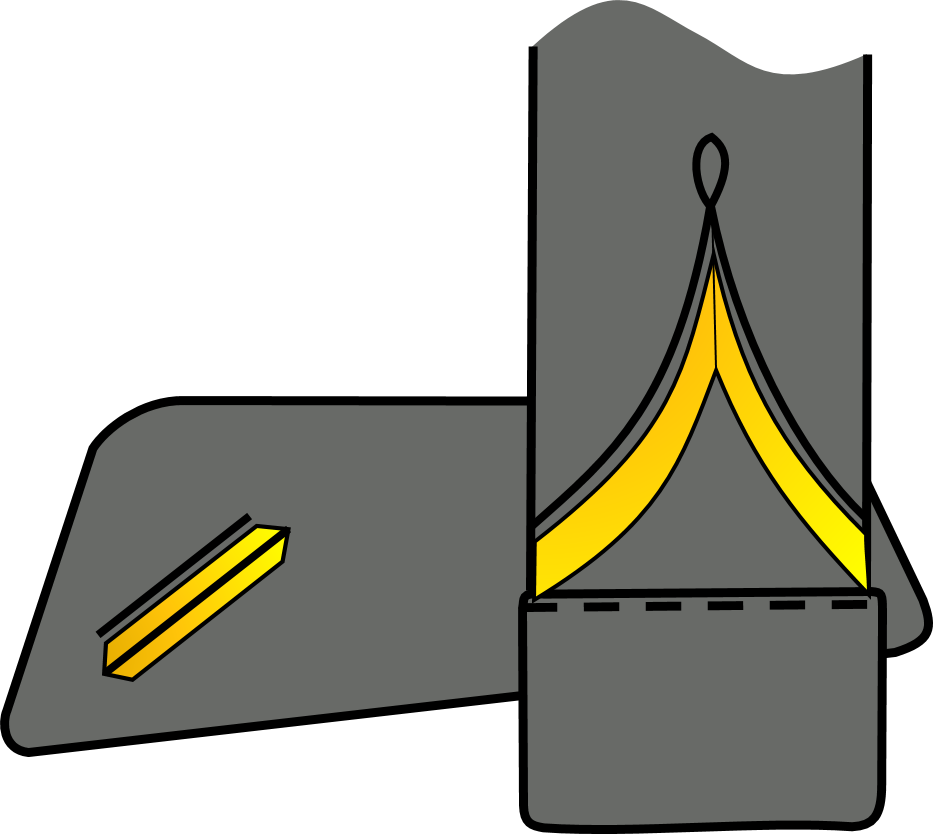
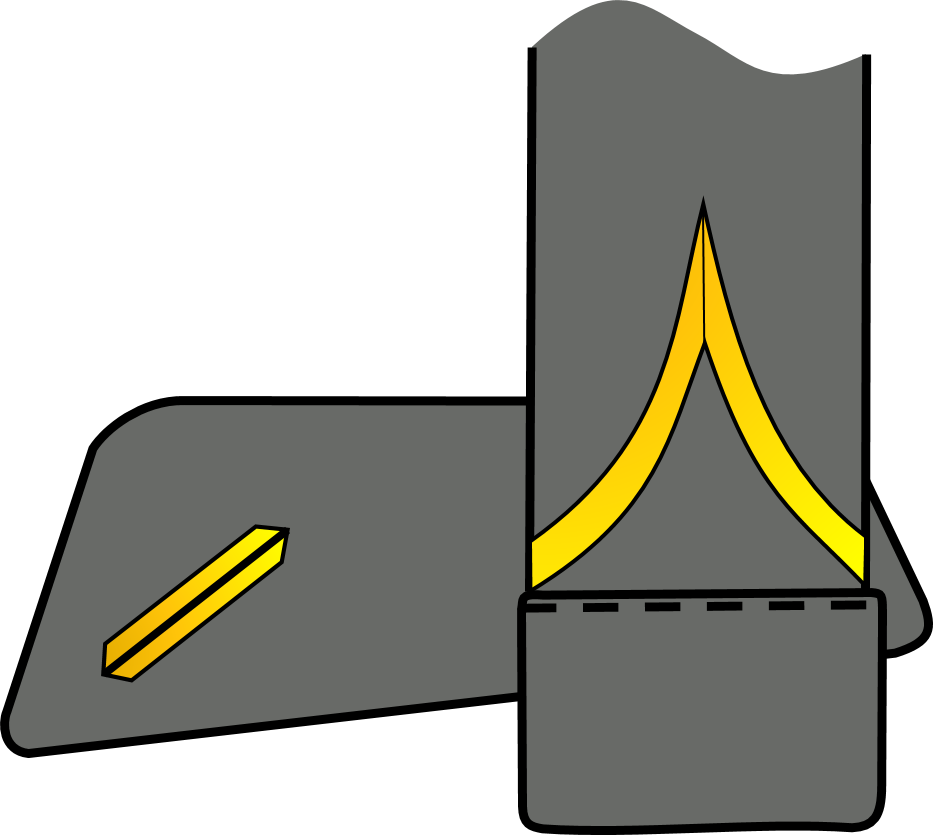
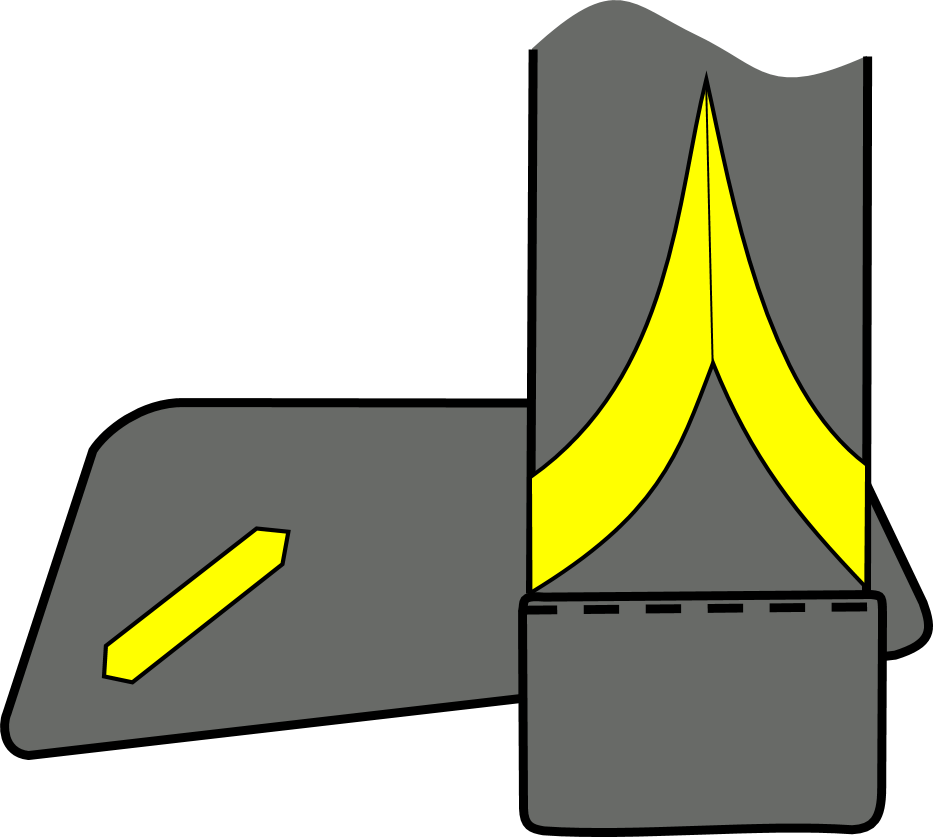
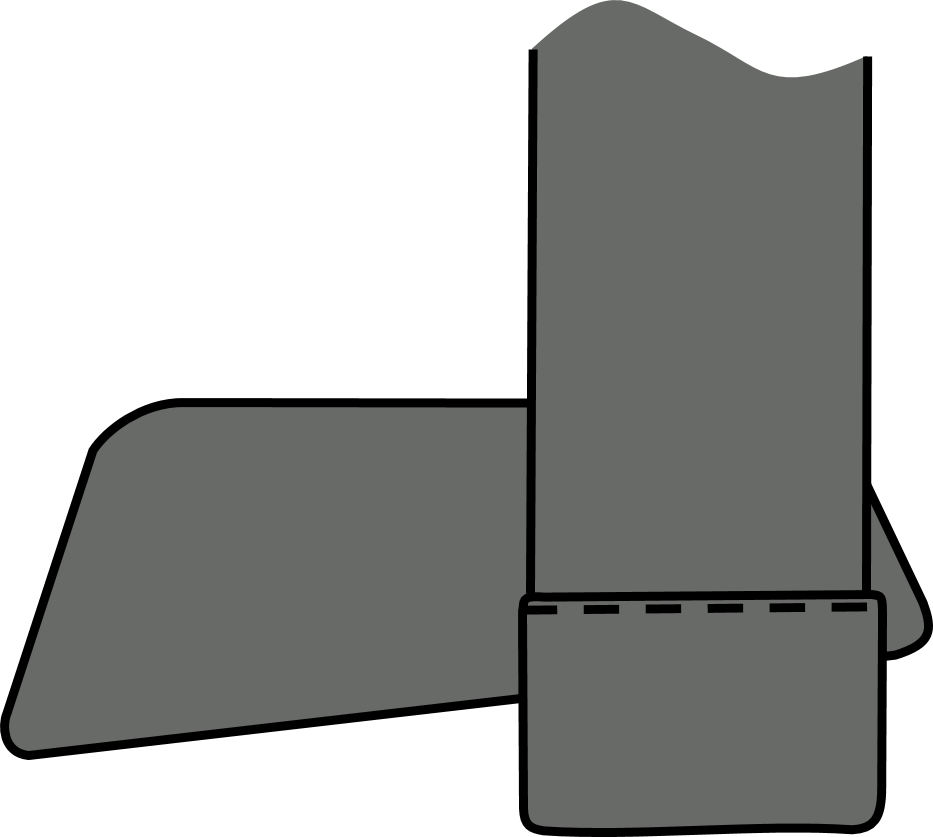
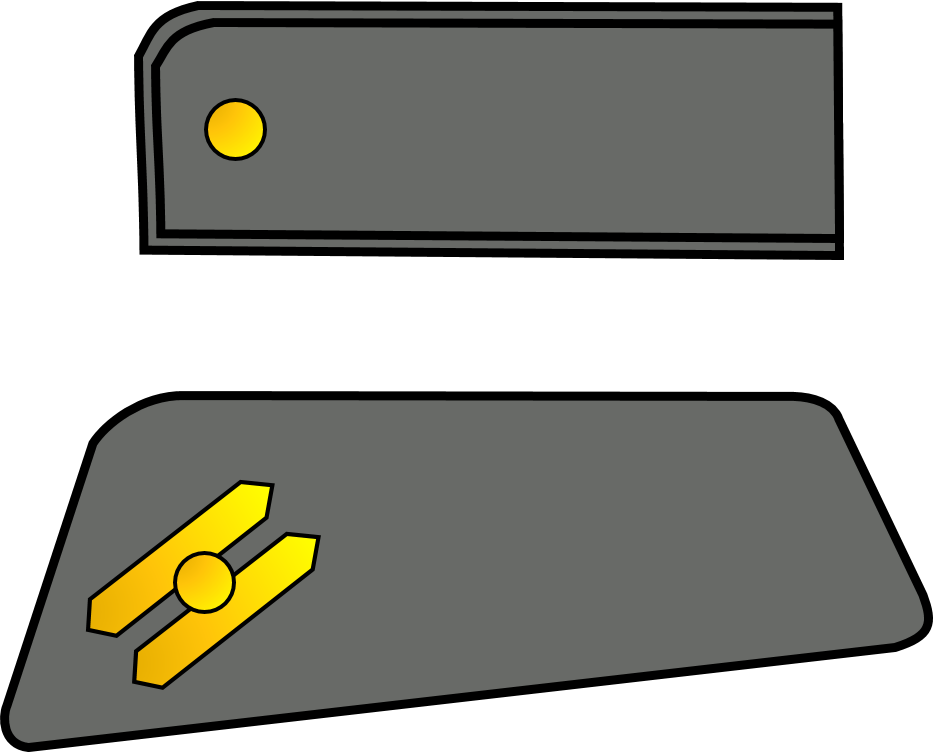
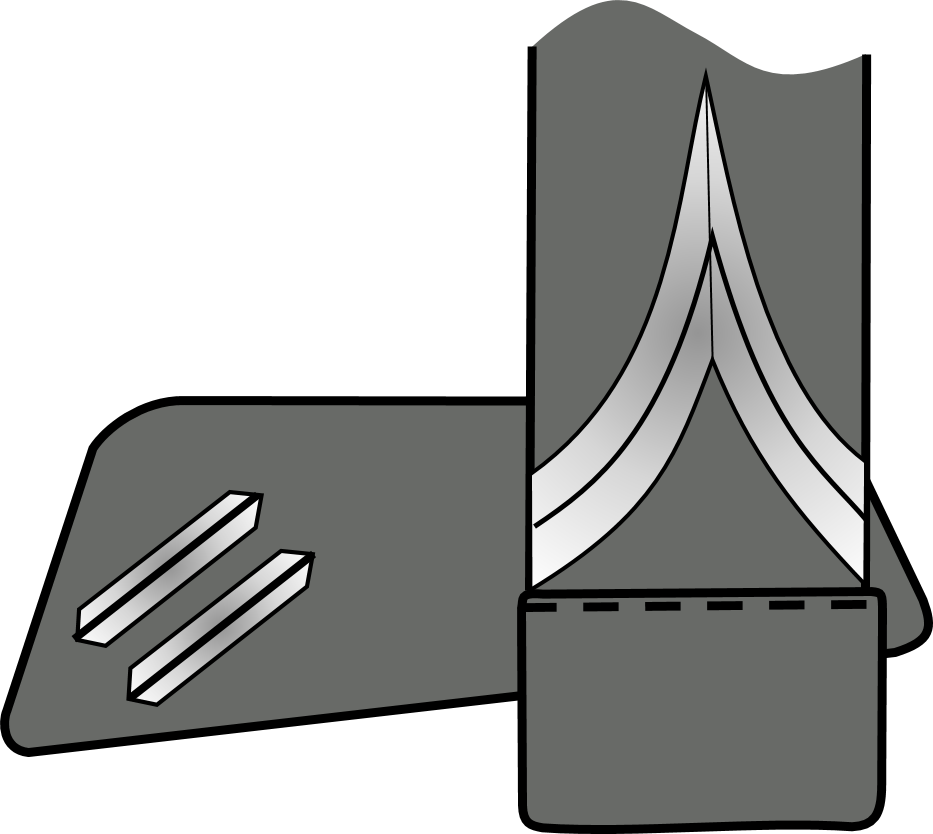
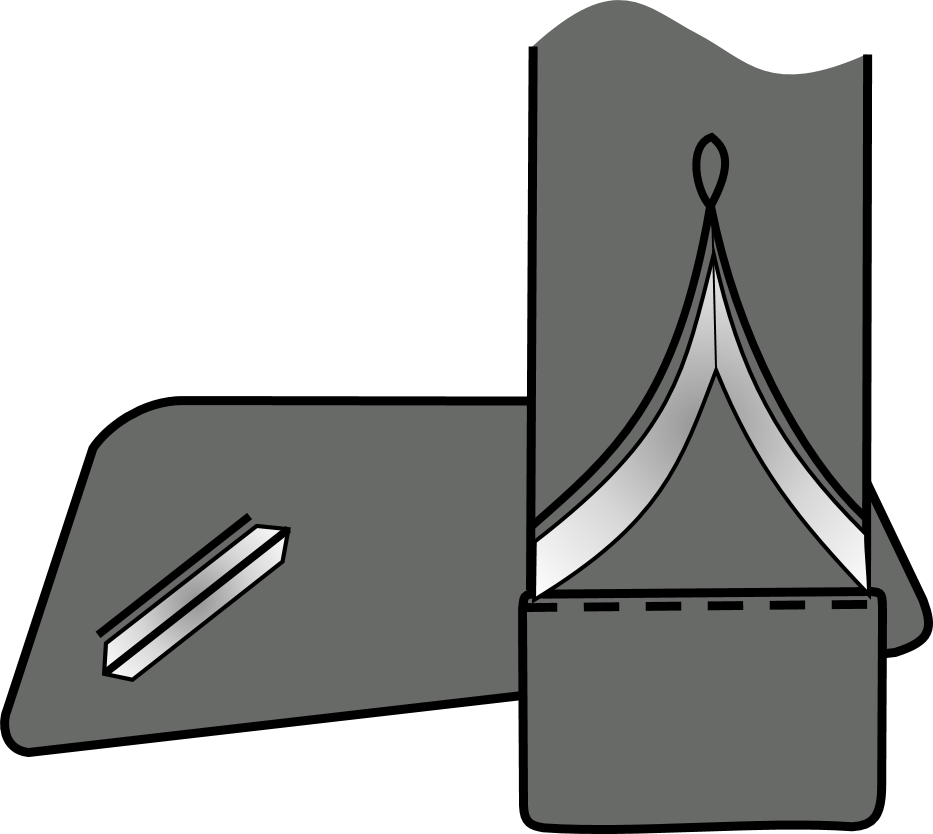
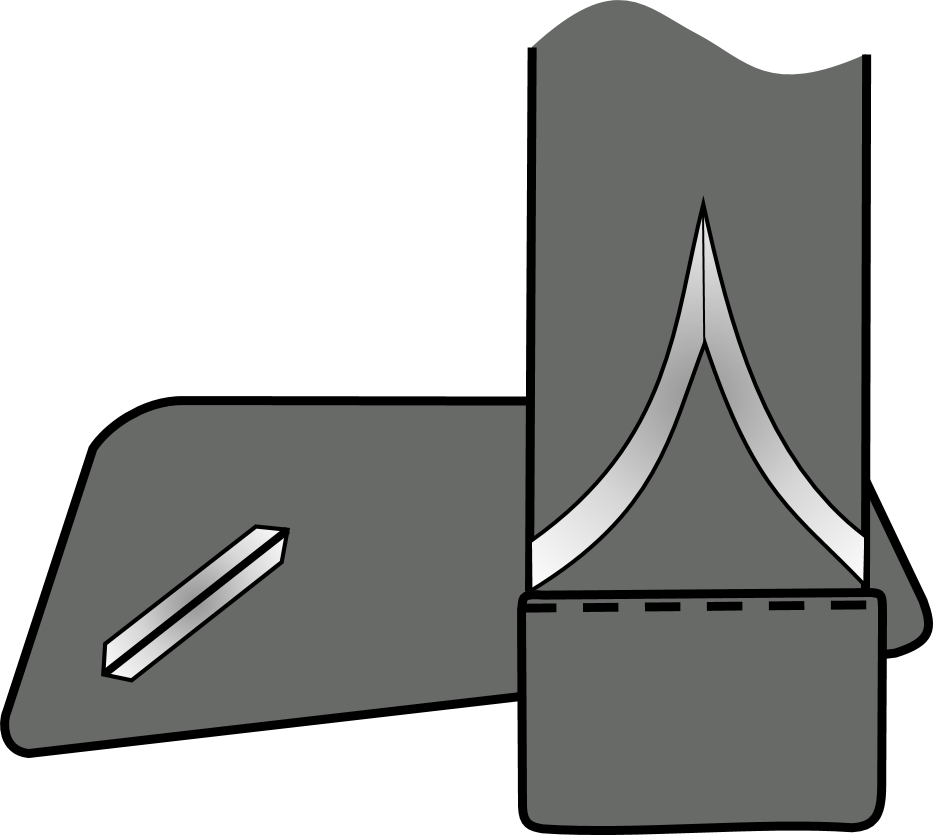
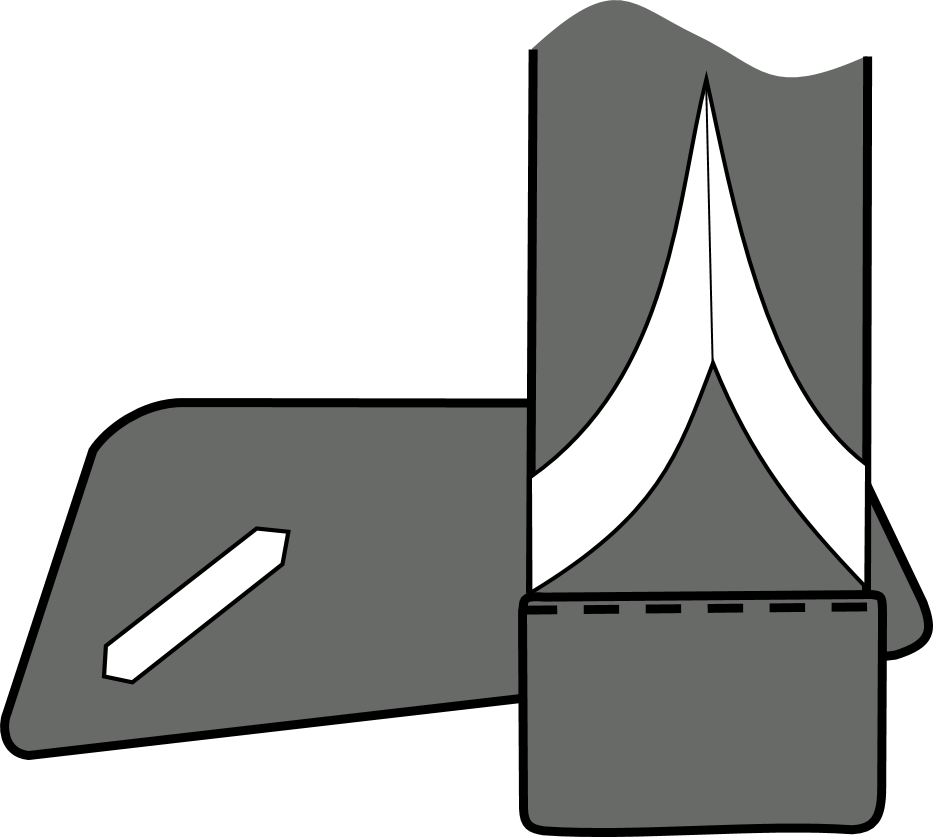
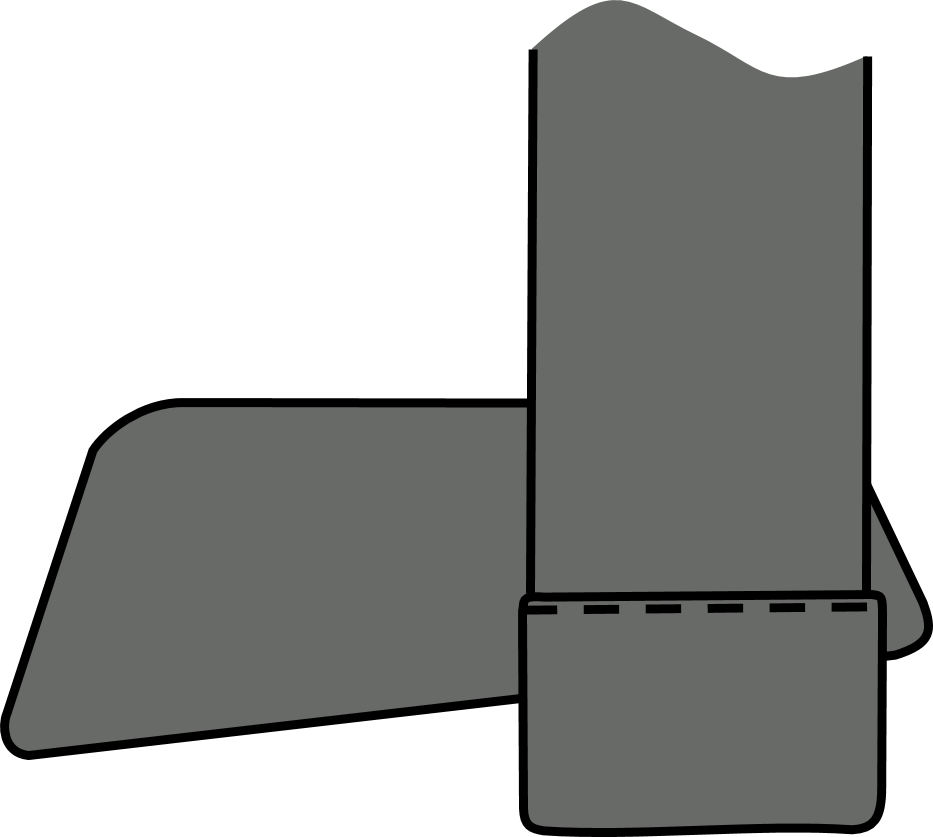
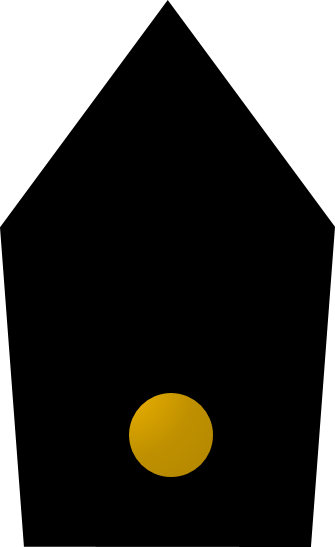
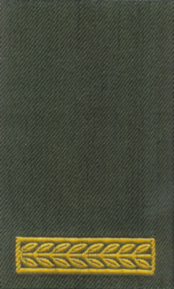
Rank group	Senior NCOs						Junior NCOs		Enlisted
Royal Netherlands Army; 1856–1922
Royal Netherlands Army; 1856–1922	Vaandeldrager	Adjudant	Opzichter	Sergeant-majoor	Sergeant der 1e klasse	Sergeant	Korporaal				Soldaat/ Kanonier
Royal Netherlands Army; 1856–1922	Vaandeldrager	Adjudant		Opperwachtmeester	Wachtmeester der 1e klasse	Wachtmeester	Brigadier				Huzaar
Rank group	Senior NCOs						Junior NCOs		Enlisted
Royal Netherlands Army; 1923–1940
Royal Netherlands Army; 1923–1940	Adjudant		Opzichter	Sergeant-majoor	Sergeant der 1e klasse	Sergeant	Korporaal				Soldaat/ Kanonier
Royal Netherlands Army; 1923–1940	Adjudant			Opperwachtmeester	Wachtmeester der 1e klasse	Wachtmeester	Brigadier				Huzaar
Rank group	Senior NCOs						Junior NCOs		Enlisted
Royal Netherlands Army; 1941–1955
Royal Netherlands Army; 1941–1955	Adjudant			Sergeant-majoor/ Opperwachtmeester	Sergeant/Wachtmeester		Korporaal		Soldaat/Huzaar/ Kanonier der 1e klasse		Soldaat/Huzaar/ Kanonier
Royal Netherlands Army; 1961–1990
Royal Netherlands Army; 1961–1990	Adjudant		Opzichter	Sergeant-majoor/ Opperwachtmeester	Sergeant der 1e klasse/ Wachtmeester der 1e klasse	Sergeant/Wachtmeester	Korporaal der 1e klasse	Korporaal	Soldaat/Huzaar/ Kanonier der 1e klasse	Soldaat/Huzaar/ Kanonier der 2e klasse	Soldaat/Huzaar/ Kanonier der 3e klasse
NATO code	OR-9		OR-8	OR-7	OR-6	OR-5	OR-4	OR-3	OR-2		OR-1

=== Royal Netherlands Air Force ===
Officer ranks

Rank group	General / flag officers					Senior officers			Junior officers
Royal Netherlands Air Force c. 1961–1988
Royal Netherlands Air Force c. 1961–1988		Generaal	Luitenant-generaal	Generaal-majoor	Commodore	Kolonel	Luitenant-kolonel	Majoor	Kapitein	Eerste-luitenant	Tweede-luitenant
NATO code	OF-10	OF-9	OF-8	OF-7	OF-6	OF-5	OF-4	OF-3	OF-2	OF-1

Student officers

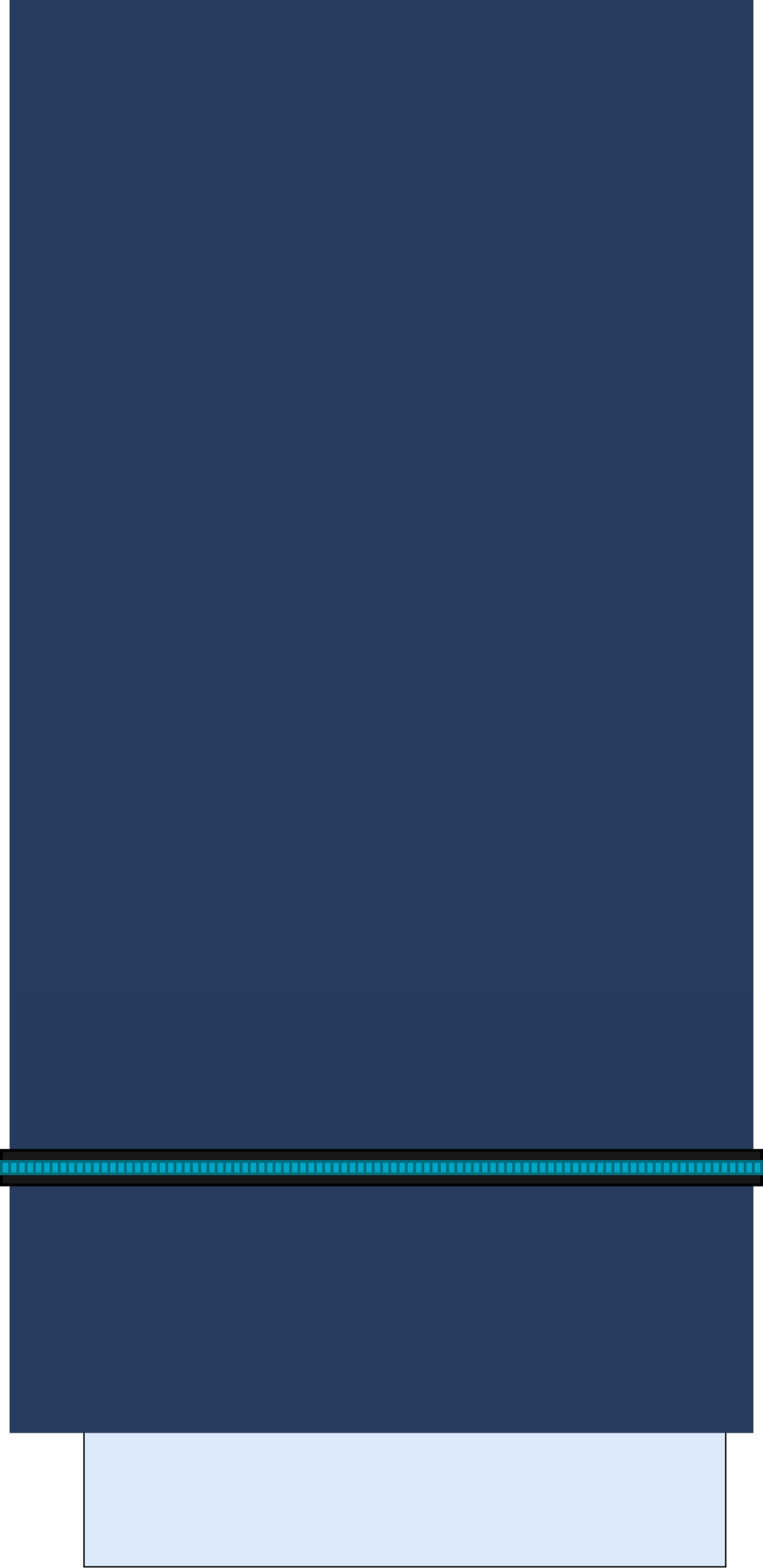
NATO code	OF(D)
Royal Netherlands Air Force c. 1961/1963
Royal Netherlands Air Force c. 1961/1963	Vaandrig	Kadet
Royal Netherlands Air Force c.1988–2002
Royal Netherlands Air Force c.1988–2002	Vaandrig

Enlisted ranks

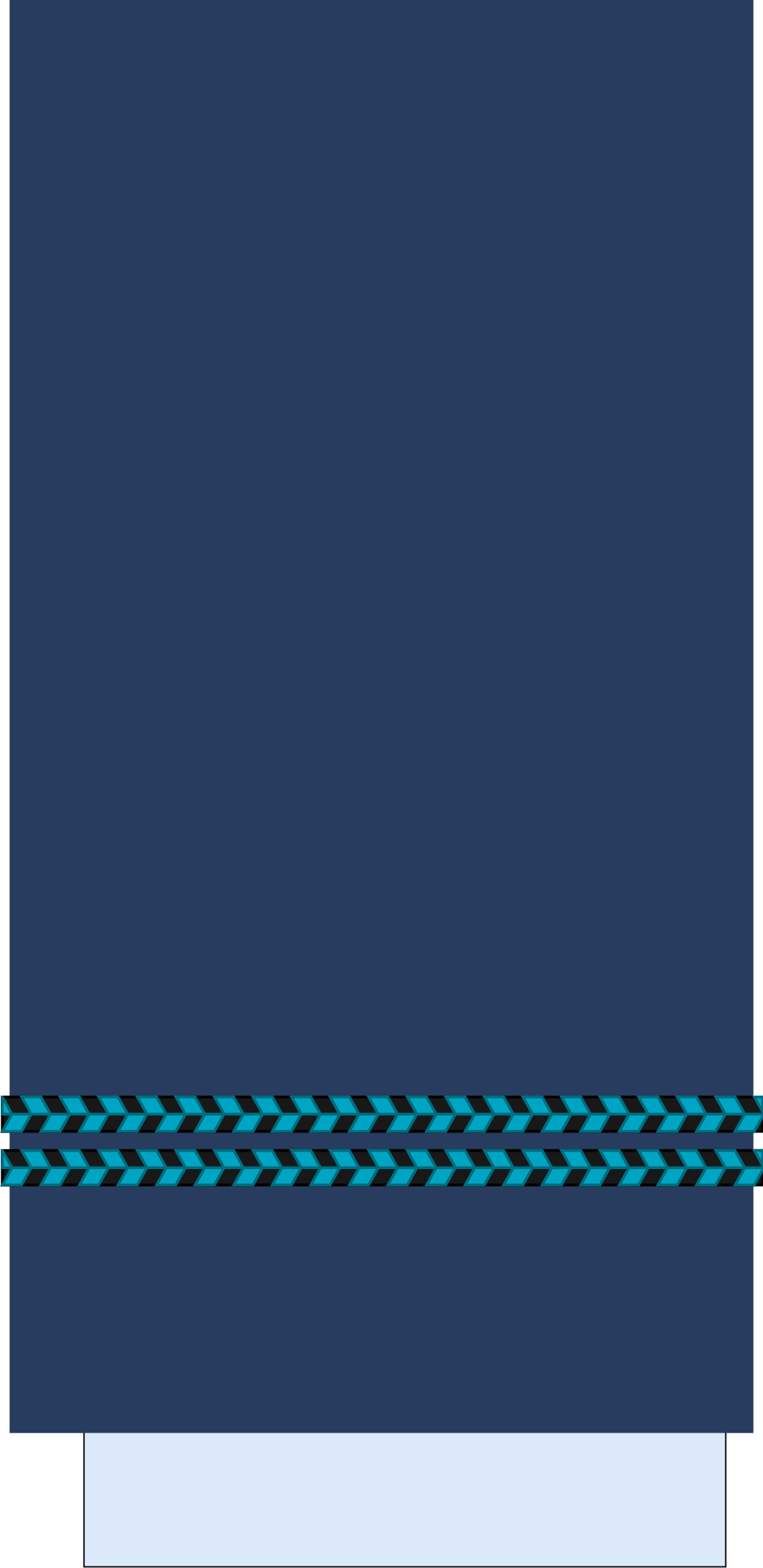
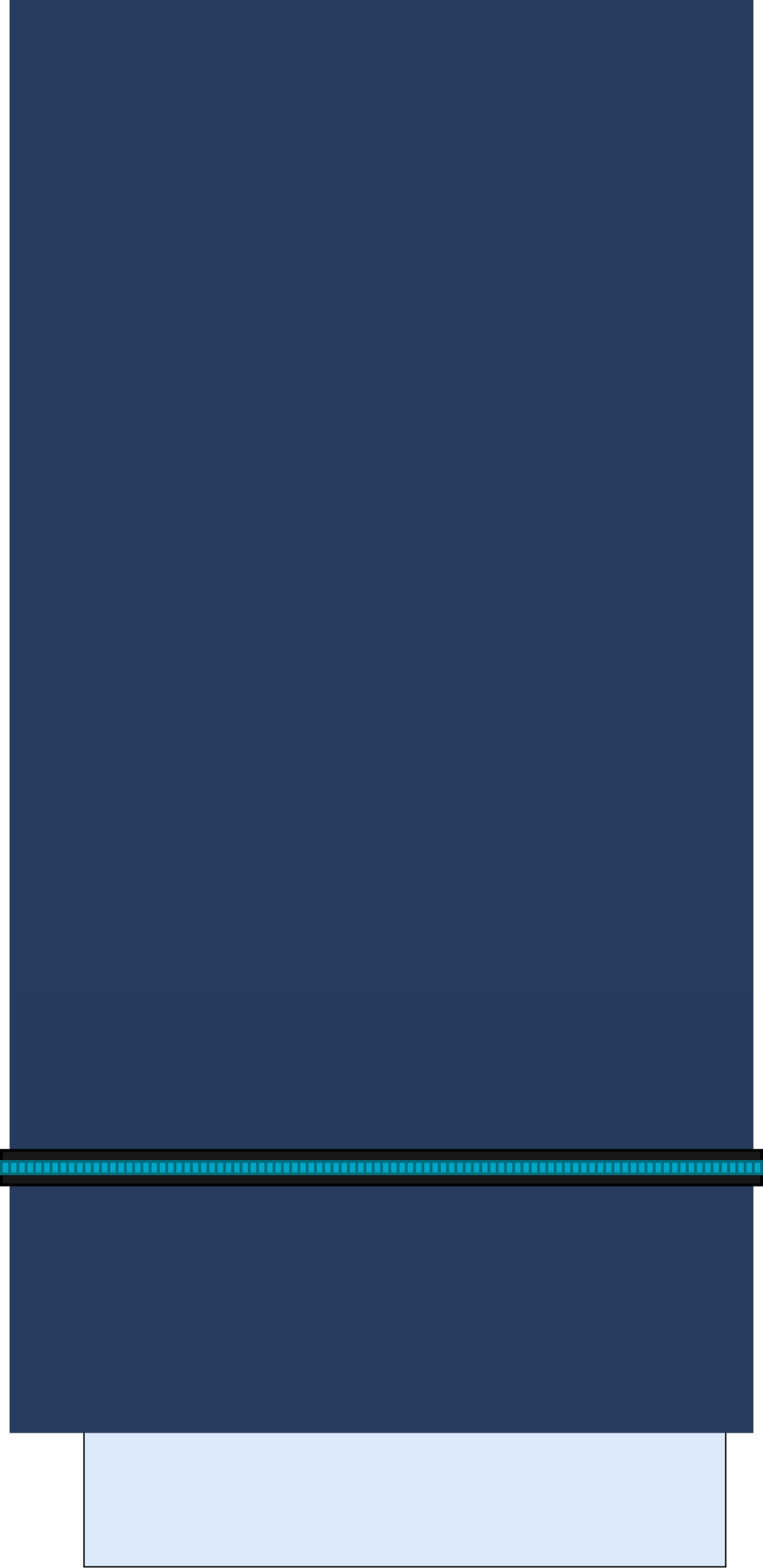
Rank group	Senior NCOs					Junior NCOs		Enlisted
Royal Netherlands Air Force c. 1963–1977
Royal Netherlands Air Force c. 1963–1977	Technisch Opzichter	Adjudant-Onderofficier/Opzichter	Sergeant-majoor	Sergeant der 1e klasse	Sergeant	Korporaal der 1e klasse	Korporaal	Soldaat der 1ste klasse	Soldaat
Royal Netherlands Air Force; 1977–unknown
Royal Netherlands Air Force; 1977–unknown	Adjudant-Onderofficier		Sergeant-majoor	Sergeant der 1e klasse	Sergeant	Korporaal der 1e klasse	Korporaal	Soldaat der 1ste klasse	Soldaat
Royal Netherlands Air Force c.1988–2002
Royal Netherlands Air Force c.1988–2002	Adjudant-Onderofficier		Sergeant-majoor	Sergeant der 1e klasse	Sergeant	Korporaal der 1e klasse	Korporaal	Soldaat der 1ste klasse	Soldaat
NATO code	OR-9	OR-8	OR-7	OR-6	OR-5	OR-4	OR-3	OR-2	OR-1

=== Royal Netherlands Navy ===
Officer ranks

Rank group	General / flag officers					Senior officers			Junior officers
Royal Netherlands Navy (–1944)
Royal Netherlands Navy (–1944)	Admiraal	Luitenant-Admiraal	Vice-Admiraal	Schout-bij-Nacht		Kapitein ter zee	Kapitein-luitenant ter zee	Luitenant ter zee der 1^{ste} klasse		Luitenant ter zee der 2^{de} klasse	Luitenant ter zee der 3^{de} klasse
Marine ranks	Kapitein-Generaal	Generaal	Luitenant-Generaal	Generaal-Majoor		Kolonel	Luitenant-Kolonel	Kapitein		1e Luitenant	2e Luitenant
Royal Netherlands Navy (1945–1955)
Royal Netherlands Navy (1945–1955)	Admiraal	Luitenant-Admiraal	Vice-Admiraal	Schout-bij-Nacht		Kapitein ter zee	Kapitein-luitenant ter zee	Luitenant ter zee der 1^{ste} klasse	Luitenant ter zee der 2^{de} klasse oudste categorie	Luitenant ter zee der 2^{de} klasse	Luitenant ter zee der 3^{de} klasse
Marine ranks	Kapitein-Generaal	Generaal	Luitenant-Generaal	Generaal-Majoor		Kolonel	Luitenant-Kolonel	Majoor	Kapitein	1e Luitenant	2e Luitenant
Royal Netherlands Navy (1955–1956)
Royal Netherlands Navy (1955–1956)	Admiraal	Luitenant-Admiraal	Vice-Admiraal	Schout-bij-Nacht	Commandeur	Kapitein ter zee	Kapitein-luitenant ter zee	Luitenant ter zee der 1^{ste} klasse	Luitenant ter zee der 2^{de} klasse oudste categorie	Luitenant ter zee der 2^{de} klasse	Luitenant ter zee der 3^{de} klasse
Marine ranks	Kapitein-Generaal	Generaal	Luitenant-Generaal	Generaal-Majoor		Kolonel	Luitenant-Kolonel	Majoor	Kapitein	1e Luitenant	2e Luitenant
Rank group	General / flag officers					Senior officers			Junior officers

=== Royal Marechaussee ===
Officer ranks

Rank group	General / flag officers					Senior officers			Junior officers
Royal Marechaussee; 1945–1961
Royal Marechaussee; 1945–1961				Generaal-Majoor	Brigade-Generaal	Kolonel	Luitenant-Kolonel	Majoor	Kapitein	Eerste-Luitenant	Tweede-Luitenant
Royal Marechaussee; 1962–1995
Royal Marechaussee; 1962–1995				Generaal-Majoor	Brigade-Generaal	Kolonel	Luitenant-Kolonel	Majoor	Kapitein	Eerste-Luitenant	Tweede-Luitenant
NATO code	OF-10	OF-9	OF-8	OF-7	OF-6	OF-5	OF-4	OF-3	OF-2	OF-1

Enlisted ranks

Rank group	Senior NCOs					Junior NCOs		Enlisted
Royal Marechaussee; 1945–1961
Royal Marechaussee; 1945–1961	Adjudant		Opperwachtmeester	Wachtmeester der 1e klasse	Wachtmeester	Marechaussee der 1e klasse	Marechaussee der 2e klasse		Marechaussee der 3e klasse
Royal Marechaussee; 1962–1995
Royal Marechaussee; 1962–1995	Adjudant	Opperwachtmeester Adm.	Opperwachtmeester	Wachtmeester der 1e klasse	Wachtmeester	Marechaussee der 1e klasse	Marechaussee der 2e klasse	Marechaussee der 3e klasse	Marechaussee der 4e klasse
NATO code	OR-9	OR-8	OR-7	OR-6	OR-5	OR-4	OR-3	OR-2	OR-1

== Former ranks ==
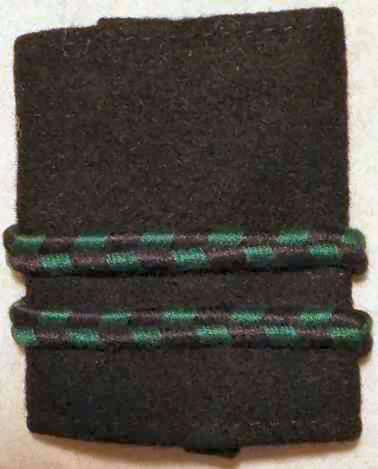
Epaulette of a Technisch Opzichter in the RNLAF.

- (Veld)Maarschalk (Field) Marshal), OF-10 of the Royal Netherlands Army, abolished in 1914.
- Further in the past there were other ranks: Admiraal-generaal (General admiral), Luitenant-admiraal-generaal (Lieutenant General Admiral), and Kapitein-generaal (Captain General).
- The Technisch Opzichter (Technical Supervisor) and Opzichter (Supervisor) ranks were discontinued in 1977.
- The rank of Kapelmeester (Bandmaster) has been discontinued (the insignia was the same as that of Adjudant).
- The rank of Onderluitenant (Under Lieutenant) existed in the Royal Netherlands East Indies Army. An Onderluitenant was the highest non-commissioned officer rank, between adjudant-onderofficier and tweede luitenant. After demobilizing the KNIL, professional soldiers were allowed to return or transfer to the Royal Netherlands Army or the Militaire Luchtvaart (the predecessor of the Royal Netherlands Air and Space Force), while maintaining their rank. The rank insignia for Onderluitenant in the KNIL (and later the Royal Army) consisted of two dots. Onderluitenant Jacques Willem van Asdonck (Rangkasbitung, West Java, 1914) was the last Onderluitenant to leave active service in 1969.

=== Admiral ===
Admiraal

== See also ==
- Royal Netherlands East Indies Army
- Admiral (Netherlands)
