= Commander of the Royal Netherlands Army =

- Commandant Landstrijdkrachten (Dutch)
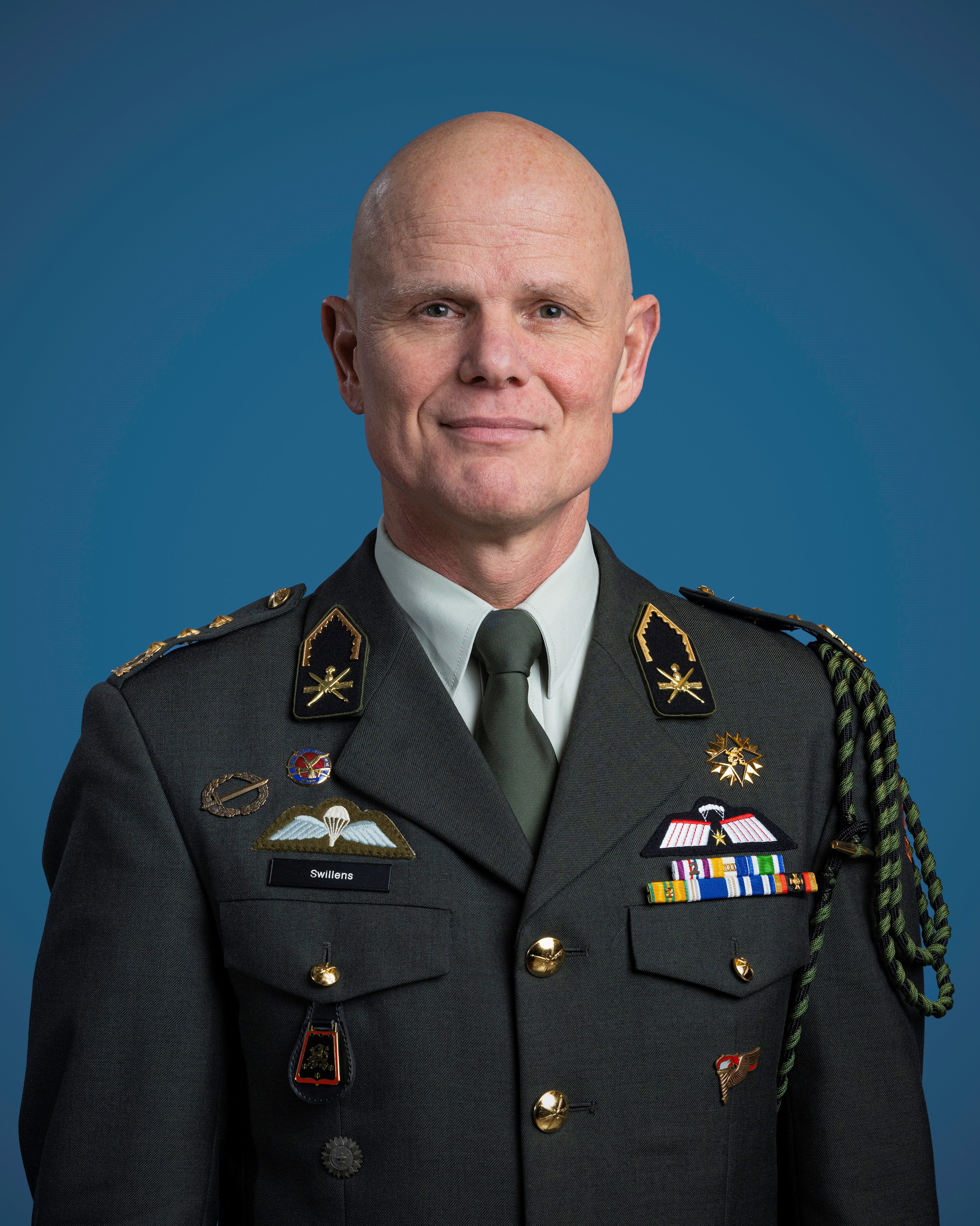
- Incumbent; Lieutenant-general Jan Swillens since 8 march 2024
- Royal Netherlands Army
- Abbreviation: C-LAS
- Reports to: Chief of Defence
- Formation: 1954
- First holder: Ben Hasselman
- Deputy: Deputy Commander
- Website: Official website

The commander of the Royal Netherlands Army (C-LAS, Dutch: Commandant Landstrijdkrachten) is the highest-ranking officer of the Royal Netherlands Army and reports directly to the chief of defence. The commander of the Royal Netherlands Army is statutorily a three-star general. The current C-LAS is Lieutenant General Jan Swillens.

== History of the C-LAS ==
The position of C-LAS was created on 5 September 2005 as part of a thorough reorganization within the Dutch Ministry of Defence in which the staffs (military and civilian) were reduced in size and an entire organizational layer was dropped. prior to the reorganization the commanding officer of the Army was the "Bevelhebber der Landstrijdkrachten" (abbreviated BLS; the term also translates into English as Commander of the Royal Netherlands Army).

== Officeholders ==
=== Commanders of the Royal Netherlands Army (pre-2005) ===
- 1954 - 1957 General Ben Hasselman
- 1957 - 1962 Lieutenant General Gillis le Fèvre de Montigny
- 1962 - 1963 Lieutenant General A.V. van den Wall Bake
- 1964 - 1968 Lieutenant General Frans van der Veen
- 1968 - 1971 Lieutenant General Willem van Rijn
- 1972 - 1973 Lieutenant General Gerrit IJsselstein
- 1973 - 1977 Lieutenant General Jan van der Slikke
- 1977 - 1980 Lieutenant General Cor de Jager
- 1980 - 1985 Lieutenant General Han Roos
- 1985 - 1988 Lieutenant General Peter Graaff
- 1988 - 1992 Lieutenant General Rien Wilmink
- 1992 - 1996 Lieutenant General Hans Couzy
- 1996 - 2001 Lieutenant General Maarten Schouten
- 2001 - 2002 Lieutenant General Ad van Baal
- 2002 - 2005 Lieutenant General Marcel Urlings

=== Commanders of the Royal Netherlands Army ===
No.	Portrait	Name (birth–death)	Term of office			Ref.
No.	Portrait	Name (birth–death)	Took office	Left office	Time in office	Ref.
1		Lieutenant general Peter van Uhm (born 1955)	5 September 2005	13 March 2008	2 years, 190 days	
2		Lieutenant general Rob Bertholee (born 1955)	13 March 2008	25 October 2011	3 years, 226 days	
3		Lieutenant general Mart de Kruif (born 1958)	25 October 2011	24 March 2016	4 years, 151 days	
4		Lieutenant general Leo Beulen (born 1960)	24 March 2016	28 August 2019	3 years, 157 days	
5		Lieutenant general Martin Wijnen (born 1966)	28 August 2019	8 march 2024	4 years, 193 days	
6		Lieutenant general Jan Swillens (born 1967)	8 march 2024	Incumbent	2 years, 183 days	

== Deputy Commanders ==
- Major General Lex Oostendorp (5 September 2005 – 25 November 2007)
- Major General Marcel van den Broek (26 November 2007 – March 2010)
- Major General Mart de Kruif (March 2010 – October 2011)
- Major General Marc van Uhm (October 2011 – January 2016)
- Major General Martin Wijnen (January 2016 – July 2017)
- Major General Kees Matthijssen (July 2017 – October 2019)
- Major General Rob Jeulink (October 2019 – present)

== See also ==
- Commander of the Royal Netherlands Air and Space Force
- Commander of the Royal Netherlands Navy
