= Heije Schaper =

Dutch politician

His Excellency Heije Schaper
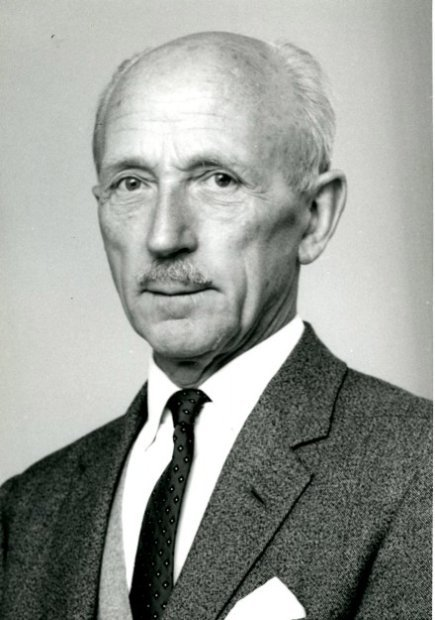
- Heije Schaper in 1966

State Secretary for Defence
- In office 22 June 1966 – 5 April 1967 Serving with Gerard Peijnenburg; Adri van Es
- Prime Minister: Jo Cals (1966); Jelle Zijlstra (1966–1967)
- Preceded by: Jan Borghouts
- Succeeded by: Bob Duynstee

Chairman of the United Defence Staff of the Armed Forces of the Netherlands
- In office 1 November 1957 – 10 May 1959
- Preceded by: Ben Hasselman
- Succeeded by: Henry Pröpper

Commander of the Royal Netherlands Air Force
- In office 1 May 1956 – 1 September 1961
- Preceded by: Anton Baretta
- Succeeded by: Hein Zielstra

Personal details
- Born: Heije Schaper; 8 September 1906 Joure, Netherlands
- Died: 26 May 1996 (aged 89) The Hague, Netherlands
- Party: Independent Liberal
- Spouse: Titia Feenstra (m. 1942)
- Children: Herman Schaper (born 1949); 2 other sons
- Education: Royal Naval College
- Occupation: Officer · Aviator

Military service
- Allegiance: Netherlands
- Branch/service: Royal Netherlands Navy (1929–1954); Royal Netherlands Air and Space Force (1954–1961)
- Years of service: 1929–1961 (Active duty); 1961–1964 (Reserve)
- Rank: Lieutenant general
- Unit: 320 Dutch Squadron RAF
- Commands: 321 Dutch Squadron RAF (1945–1946); Royal Netherlands Air Force (1956–1961); Armed forces of the Netherlands (1957–1959)
- Battles/wars: World War II; Battle of the Netherlands; Battle of France; Battle of Britain
- Chief military adjutant to the: Monarch of the Netherlands (1962–1978)

Heije Schaper (8 September 1906 – 26 May 1996) was a Dutch naval and air force officer and lieutenant general of the Royal Netherlands Air Force.

A highly decorated World War II officer, Schaper was awarded the Military Order of William, the highest honour of the Netherlands on 15 November 1940. Schaper served in the Royal Netherlands Navy and later the Royal Netherlands Air Force. He was the Commander of the Royal Netherlands Air Force from 1 May 1956 until 1 September 1961 and the Chairman of the United Defence Staff of the Armed Forces of the Netherlands (highest-ranking military officer) from 1 November 1957 until 10 May 1959. He retired from active service in 1961 and served as State Secretary for Defence, tasked with Air Force affairs from 22 June 1966 until 5 April 1967.

== Decorations ==
Military decorations
Ribbon bar	Decoration	Country	Date	Comment
	Knight 4th Class of the Military Order of William	Netherlands	15 November 1940	Highest honour of the Netherlands
	War Memorial Cross	Netherlands	5 May 1946	
	Medal for Order and Peace	Netherlands		
	Mobilisation War Cross	Netherlands	1 June 1945	
	Distinction sign for Long-term, Honest and Loyal Service	Netherlands	22 June 1966	Honorable discharge
	Distinguished Flying Cross	United Kingdom	10 January 1941	
Honours
Ribbon bar	Honour	Country	Date	Comment
	Commander of the Order of the Netherlands Lion	Netherlands	17 April 1967	
	Grand Officer of the Order of Orange-Nassau	Netherlands		

Political offices
Preceded by Jan Borghouts	State Secretary for Defence; 1966–1967; Served alongside: Gerard Peijnenburg; Adri van Es	Succeeded by Bob Duynstee
Military offices
Preceded by Anton Baretta	Commander of the Royal; Netherlands Air Force; 1956–1961	Succeeded by Hein Zielstra
Preceded by Ben Hasselman	Chairman of the United Defence Staff of the Armed Forces of the Netherlands; 1957–1959	Succeeded by Henry Propper
