= Commander of the Royal Netherlands Air and Space Force =

Professional head of the Royal Netherlands Air and Space Force

- Commandant Lucht-en Ruimtestrijdkrachten (Dutch)

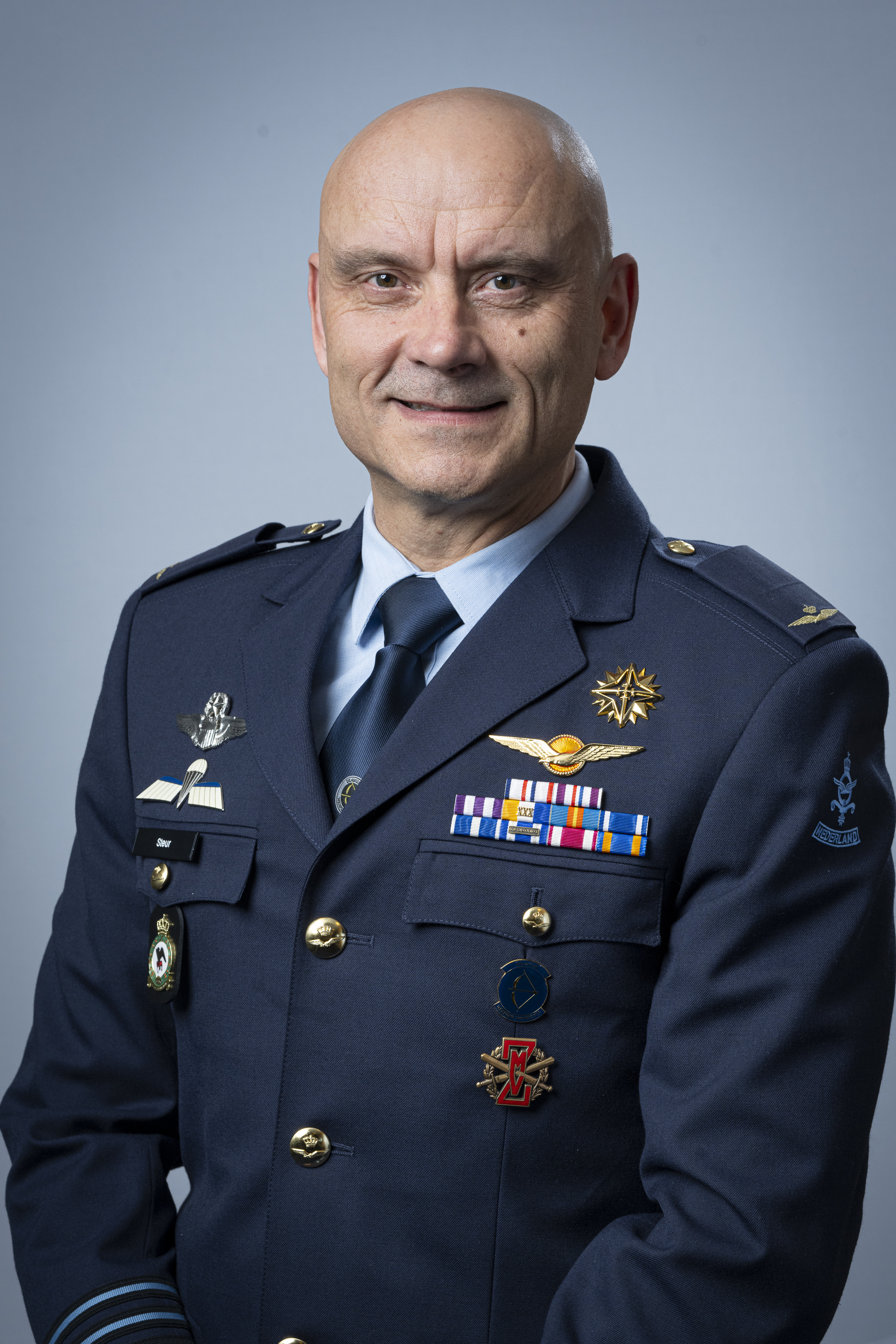
- Incumbent; Lieutenant-general André Steur since 14 April 2023
- Royal Netherlands Air and Space Force
- Abbreviation: C-LRS
- Reports to: Chief of Defence
- Formation: 1954
- First holder: Anton Baretta
- Deputy: Deputy commander
- Website: Official website

The Commander of the Royal Netherlands Air and Space Force (C-LRS) (Dutch: Commandant Lucht-en Ruimtestrijdkrachten) is the highest-ranking officer of the Royal Netherlands Air and Space Force. He reports directly to the Chief of the Defence (CDS).

Before being renamed to C-LRS in Dutch on 1 June 2025 due to the addition of a space force to the air force, the position of C-LSK (Commandant Luchtstrijdkrachten) was head of the air force. The position of C-LSK had been in use since 5 September 2005 as part of a reorganization within the Dutch Ministry of Defence in which staff were reduced in size and an entire organizational layer was dropped. Before this reform the commanding officer of the Air Force was called Bevelhebber der Luchtstrijdkrachten.

The Commander of the Royal Netherlands Air and Space Force is statutorily a lieutenant general and is the head of the Air and Space Force Command (CLRS). They are responsible for preparation, operational command and completion of Air and Space Force operations. In addition, at the request of the CDS, the C-LRS can take joint-command of air operations carried out together with other branches of the Dutch armed forces or foreign militaries, and render support to civilian authorities (foreign and domestic) to maintain the rule of law, combat disasters, provide humanitarian aid, transport patients and firefighting.

== List of officeholders ==
1954–2005 (Bevelhebber der Luchtstrijdkrachten)

- 1954–1956 Anton Baretta
- 1956–1961 Heije Schaper
- 1961–1965 Hein Zielstra
- 1965–1970 Bertie Wolff
- 1970–1973 Flip van der Wolf
- 1973–1976 Hans Knoop
- 1976–1981 Rien Geschiere
- 1981–1985 Cas Baas
- 1985–1989 Fred de Jong
- 1989–1992 Willy Cornelis Louwerse
- 1992–1995 Heinz Manderfeld
- 1995–2000 Ben Droste
- 2000–2004 Dick Berlijn
- 2004–2005 Dirk Starink

No.	Portrait	Name (lifespan)	Term of office			Ref.
No.	Portrait	Name (lifespan)	Took office	Left office	Time in office	Ref.
Commander of the Air Force (Dutch: Commandant Luchtstrijdkrachten)
1		Lieutenant-General; Hans de Jong	5 September 2005	29 May 2008	2 years, 267 days	
2		Lieutenant-General; Jac Jansen (born 1956)	29 May 2008	9 March 2012	3 years, 285 days	
3		Lieutenant-General; Sander Schnitger (1958–2020)	9 March 2012	10 June 2016	4 years, 93 days	
4		Lieutenant-General; Dennis Luyt (born 1963)	10 June 2016	14 April 2023	6 years, 308 days	
5		Lieutenant-General; André Steur (born 1970)	14 April 2023	1 July 2025	2 years, 78 days	
Commander of the Air and Space Force (Dutch: Commandant Lucht-en Ruimtestrijdkrachten)
1		Lieutenant-General; André Steur (born 1970)	1 July 2025	Incumbent	1 year, 68 days	

== See also ==
- Commander of the Royal Netherlands Army
- Commander of the Royal Netherlands Navy
