= 52nd Munich Security Conference =

The 52nd Munich Security Conference took place from 12 to 14 February 2016. 600 international guests attended the event, including 30 heads of state, 70 foreign and defence ministers, directors of various intelligence agencies and 700 journalists from 48 countries.

== Welcome ==
The chairman of the Munich Security Conference, Wolfgang Ischinger, described in his welcoming speech the central themes of the conference. Ischinger warned that the international order was in its worst shape since the end of the Cold War, and described the outlook as "grim" and urged the international community, especially Europe, to expand their efforts to cooperate.

== Opening speeches ==
For the first time, the defence ministers of Germany and France, Ursula von der Leyen and Jean-Yves Le Drian, opened the conference together. In her speech, von der Leyen focused on the challenges associated with the European refugee crisis. She stressed that helping refugees was a humanitarian obligation. The defence minister reported that the Bundeswehr participated, as part of a NATO mission in the eastern Mediterranean, in the fight against people smuggling and contributed to the integration of refugees in Germany by training refugees in civilian occupations. Von der Leyen also stressed that the influx of refugees had to be reduced as a whole, in order to help focus on those people in actual need of protection. In his part of the opening speech, Le Drian focused on the war in Syria and international terrorism. Against the backdrop of the recent terrorist attacks in France, he called for a strengthening of the fight against the 'Islamic State' terrorist militia. A ceasefire in Syria, he said, could only be reached if Russia put an end to its bombing attacks in the country.

== Conflict between NATO and the Russian Federation ==
Le Drian stressed the importance of the agreement that the Syria Contact Group had reached before the conference. According to this accord, within one week, a ceasefire in Syria should be put into place. Special importance was placed on this agreement, since despite the tense political situation between NATO and Russia, all participants in the contact group had agreed on this goal.

During a speech on the second conference day, NATO Secretary General Jens Stoltenberg described the situation between the West and Russia from the Alliance's perspective. He called Russia's actions an attempt to destabilize and intimidate the Western security order and Russia's western-oriented neighbours. In response to this strategy, Stoltenberg reaffirmed the joint solidarity among NATO members and stressed the readiness of the Alliance for collective defence. He also called for the examination of renewed talks within the NATO-Russia Council. Stoltenberg stated: "We do not want a new Cold War with Russia".

The tensions between the West and Russia were the subject of much debate at the conference. An additional point of contention was the speech by Russian Prime Minister Dmitry Medvedev, whose remarks were understood by some participants as indicating that it was Moscow's conviction that the West and Russia had "slipped into a new Cold War". Medvedev complained that "Russophobia" had become "fashionable", and that from Russia's point of view, the West had stopped the dialogue with Russia and treated the country in an arbitrary way. He denounced NATO's deterrence doctrine and interpreted the sanctions against Russia as having an aggressive intent. Despite these allegations, the Prime Minister announced that Russia was working on a "European Peace Union" and that they also gathered in Munich in the interests of European security. He promised a constructive role for Moscow in the Syria conflict and attributed Russia's military involvement in the country to the high number of IS fighters hailing from Russia and emphasized that they "must not be allowed to return to their home country." He also stressed that there was no evidence of alleged Russian attacks on Syrian civilians. He criticized the West's euphoria about the Arab Spring as naive and asked where the hopes for democracy had gone. Medvedev blamed political developments in the Middle East for the rise of IS. He called on the Syrian opposition to start negotiations with President Assad. At the same time he rejected a distinction between IS and other groups because all terrorist groups identified by Moscow had to be fought equally.

In a debate between the Presidents of countries neighbouring Russia, Poland and Latvia urged a strengthening of NATO and a greater leadership role for the US in the Alliance. Lithuanian President Dalia Grybauskaitė stated that Russia had already started a "hot war". President of the European Parliament Martin Schulz, who also participated in the debate, warned against attempts by the Russian Federation to drive a wedge into the EU.

Ukrainian President Petro Poroshenko finally turned to the absent Russian President Vladimir Putin, stressing that he believes that it is not a civil war in Ukraine, but the consequences of Russian aggression and Russian occupation, due to a clash of different value systems. He also warned against the intention by Russia to try to destabilize and divide Europe with the support of populist parties.

Russian Foreign Minister Sergey Lavrov reiterated the accusation already expressed by Prime Minister Medvedev that NATO and EU refused cooperation with Russia and treated the country as an enemy. He also expressed the frustrations of his government about Western demands for a cessation of Russian air raids on moderate rebels. German Foreign Minister Frank-Walter Steinmeier finally expressed his belief that NATO and Russia were not in a Cold War. According to Steinmeier, it was important for the EU "to keep intact". If successful, the Foreign Minister continued, a lot would be won.

During the conference, a telephone conversation between US President Barack Obama and Russian President Vladimir Putin was brought to attention, in which both parties assessed the results regarding Syria as positive.

US Secretary of State John Kerry said at the security conference that the international community had never been faced with so many crises simultaneously. The Foreign Minister recalled the situation in 1963, the year of the first security conference in Munich. Back then, Kerry declared, the Cold War was "pretty hot", yet the world had overcome the crisis. Kerry described the optimism of former US President John F. Kennedy Jr., who had demanded in Berlin in 1963 to look beyond the current dangers "to the hopes of tomorrow". Drawing on this, Kerry continued, he finds courage for the ongoing fight against terrorism.

== Syria and the fight against IS ==
The situation in Syria and the fight against terrorism was another important issue of the security conference. King Abdullah of Jordan reiterated in this context that the war on terror was not merely a task for the countries of the Middle East. The King pointed to the European dimension of the problem, since the Balkans had ultimately served as a save haven for IS. Jordan’s King stated that the fight against terrorism was a Third World War being fought through other means. Afghan President Ashraf Ghani criticized Europe in his speech, saying that it had failed to grasp the rise of IS. Observers viewed the allegations from Ghani as an attempt to divert attention away from his own inadequacies.

Iraqi Prime Minister Haider al-Abadi mentioned the efforts by his country in the fight against IS and added that further measures by the Iraqi government would follow. In addition to positive developments such as the improved security situation in Baghdad, which he referred to as the best since 2003, the prime minister described the existence of groups that are no longer controlled by the Iraqi state, as worrying. He was also highly critical of unauthorized troop deployments by Turkey in Iraqi territory. Saudi Arabia's Foreign Minister Adel al-Jubeir attacked Syrian ruler Assad and stated that IS consisted of "psychopaths without religion".

== Middle East situation ==
During a panel discussion on the situation in the Middle East, US Senator John McCain described the global political landscape in clear terms. Because of eroding balances of power, McCain stated that the current world order was in a state of decay. The senator accused the West of being weak vis-à-vis Russia and criticized the diplomatic approach pursued by US Secretary of State Kerry. This attitude, according to McCain, would only promote the military aggression of Russia. The Senator also expressed skepticism towards the Syria agreement, which he said rewarded aggression and was just another sign of Western weakness. McCain also stated that this agreement was insufficient to end the refugee crisis, which Russia would be using as a weapon against the Western community. The Secretary General of the Gulf Cooperation Council, Abdullatif bin Rashid Al Zayani, supported the Syria agreement. Norbert Röttgen, Chairman of the Foreign Affairs Committee in the Bundestag, said that Russia had won the upper hand in the Middle East through its violent actions in Syria. He also spoke out against further concessions of the West in the Russo-Ukrainian war in exchange for Russian concessions in Syria. He called it a mistake not to have established a safe zone for Syrian refugees in 2015, thus leading to spill-over effects across the region. Röttgen called on Europe to take responsibility for its own security. Israeli defence minister Moshe Ya'alon criticized the lack of a "grand strategy" for the West in order to deal with terrorism and the political situation in the Middle East. He reiterated the Israeli strategy of "red lines" vis-à-vis Syria. Finally, he added that the conflict between NATO and Russia did not constitute a new Cold War, since Moscow was acting unilaterally and no aggression on the part of the West was initiated.

== Future of NATO ==
During a panel discussion on the future of NATO, Poland's Foreign Minister Witold Waszczykowski expressed general satisfaction with the increased number of NATO troops in Eastern Europe and at the same time, stated that it was necessary to deploy more Alliance forces and establish permanent military installations. The Foreign Minister described the NATO-Russia Founding Act from 1997, which limited the deployment of NATO troops in former Warsaw Pact countries, to be "invalid" in the context of recent political developments and the aggressive appearance of Russia, and called for the "equal treatment" of stationing forces similar to NATO's western states. Norwegian Prime Minister Erna Solberg said during the discussion that NATO must ensure the security of all Member States, not only of those countries located on the Alliance's eastern and southern flanks.

== North Korean nuclear program ==
During a panel discussion on the role of China in the international community, Senator Bob Corker, chairman of the US Senate Foreign Relations Committee, criticized the inadequate actions by the Chinese government against the nuclear armament of North Korea. Corker accused Beijing of refusing to solve the nuclear issue and also of providing sensitive technology to North Korea and Iran. Fu Ying, chairperson of the Foreign Affairs Committee of the National People's Congress of China, rejected the criticism, but expressed her government's displeasure with Pyongyang's action. Former Australian Prime Minister Kevin Rudd also warned of further nuclear armament of North Korea and called for a diplomatic solution to the conflict. He warned that should this approach fail, it would be "very, very ugly".

== Intelligence Services ==
For the first time, the heads of important Western Intelligence Services took part in a public panel discussion at the security conference. James Clapper, US Director of National Intelligence, Robert Hannigan, Director of the British intelligence agency GCHQ, Rob Bertholee, director of the Dutch secret service AIVD and Gerhard Conrad, Director of the EU Intelligence Analysis Centre INTCEN, discussed together with Vint Cerf, Internet pioneer and vice president of Google, the relationship between security and civil liberty. The representatives of the intelligence services talked about the global security situation and warned against the high number of potential terrorists from the ranks of the so-called Islamic State. According to Clapper, 6,900 of the 38,000 'Islamic State' fighters would hail from Western countries. He described that IS was using high-tech online methods for recruitment and propaganda purposes. Clapper warned against attacks by IS using chemical weapons, since they have access to some industrially produced chemical weapons and had already deployed them in the past. Clapper also stated that the infrastructure in Western industrial nations was threatened by future terrorist attacks. INTCEN Director Conrad referred in this context to the new risks associated with Big Data. The intelligence service officials agreed with the demand for improved data exchange between their services. GCHQ Chief Hannigan also warned of IS cyberattacks, but unlike Clapper, did not speak in favor of backdoors in encryption programs. In connection with the new transatlantic data agreement "Privacy Shield", Clapper announced that it should also respect the privacy rights of citizens of other countries. Google vice-president Cerf stated that the Internet could only preserve its advantages "if it was kept free, global, and open, ensuring the freedom of all its users".

== Ewald von Kleist Award 2016 ==
The Ewald von Kleist Prize 2016 was awarded at a reception hosted by the Bavarian Minister-President Horst Seehofer at the Munich Residenz to Christiana Figueres, Secretary General of the Secretariat of the United Nations Framework Convention on Climate Change, and Laurent Fabius, former French Foreign Minister. Both received the award for their roles in the adoption of the Convention of Paris, the successor to the Kyoto Protocol in December 2015. The award address was given by UN deputy Secretary General Jan Eliasson. The particularly small number of U.S. participants at this traditional event was interpreted by observers as an expression of criticism towards Seehofer's trip to Moscow immediately before the security conference.

== Situation in Africa ==
In a panel discussion on the situation in Africa, former Secretary-General of the United Nations Kofi Annan described the grim prospects of African youth as an important root cause for refugee flows and terrorism. He called for more humanitarian and social engagement in solving the crises, stressing that purely military measures will not succeed. Annan also stated that Africa's economic growth in recent years had only reached a small elite, which had failed to invest resources in the development of their countries. Hassan Sheikh Mohamud, President of Somalia, reiterated Annan's views and described that in his country many militiamen had joined the al-Shabaab terrorist group because of economic reasons. Other participants including Salil Shetty, Secretary General of Amnesty International, accused the West of a significant involvement in the conflict.

== Refugee crisis ==
During a panel discussion on the refugee crisis, Peter Altmaier, Chief of the German Chancellery and Federal Minister for Special Affairs, stressed the importance of a ceasefire in Syria. Altmaier called for a quota of refugees in Europe and stated that accommodations should be located near their countries of origin to provide them with homes and schools there. In this context, Altmaier also emphasized the transfer of refugees to Turkey or their repatriation to safe countries of origin. He stressed that the crisis could not be solved with purely national measures. Turkish Foreign Minister Mevlüt Çavuşoğlu said that Turkey protected Europe from "overload and criminal risks" by taking in 2.5 million Syrian refugees. He also urged better coordination of international assistance. Dutch Foreign Minister Bert Koenders said that besides refugees in need of protection, many people with other motivations were flocking to Europe. Therefore, the foreign minister called for protection of the EU's external borders and better controls of those who entered. According to Koenders, there was no lack of a European strategy regarding the refugee issue, but he criticized weaknesses in its implementation. Italian Foreign Minister Paolo Gentiloni described the refugee crisis as a "permanent problem", in which domestic political considerations often prevented a European solution. Gentiloni warned that this was becoming a major threat for the continent.

== See also ==
- Diplomacy
- International relations
- International security
- Internationalism
- Pirate Security Conference
