= Edzard =

Edzard may refer to:

== Given name ==
- Edzard I, Count of East Frisia (1462–1528)
- Edzard II, Count of East Frisia (1532–1599)
- Edzard Cirksena (born 1441), East Frisian chieftain at Greetsiel, Norden, Emden and Brokmerland
- Edzard Ernst (born 1948), academic physician and researcher specializing in complementary and alternative medicine
- Edzard Koning (1869–1954), Dutch painter
- Edzard Reuter (1928-2024), CEO of Daimler-Benz from 1987 to 1995
- Edzard Schaper (1908–1984), German author
- Edzard Schmidt-Jortzig (born 1941), German jurist
- Edzard Jacob van Holthe, Dutch military officer
- Edzard zu Innhausen und Knyphausen (1827–1908), Frisian landowner and politician
- Charles Edzard, Prince of East Frisia (1716–1744)
- Count Ferdinand Edzard of East Frisia (1636–1668)

== Surname ==
- Christine Edzard (born 1945), film director, writer, and costume designer, nominated for BAFTA and Oscar awards for her screenwriting
- Dietz Otto Edzard (1930–2004), German scholar of the Ancient Near East and grammarian of the Sumerian language

== See also ==
- Edward
- Zard
