= Martin Wijnen =

Dutch Lieutenant-general (born 1966)

Lieutenant general Martin Wijnen
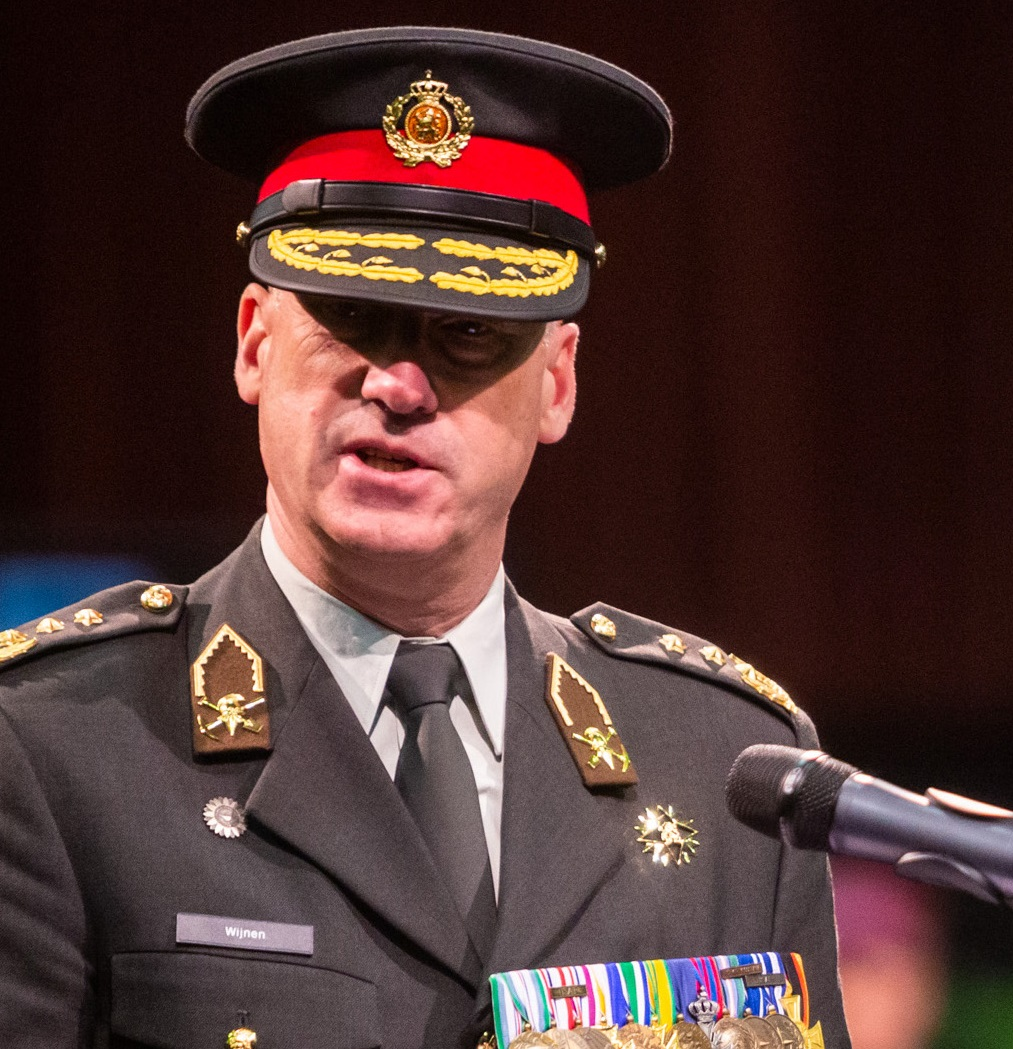
- Lt Gen Martin Wijnen (Zwolle, 4 March 2019)

Commander of the Royal Netherlands Army
- In office 28 August 2019 – 8 March 2024
- Preceded by: Leo Beulen
- Succeeded by: Jan Swillens

Personal details
- Born: 3 February 1966 (age 60)

Military service
- Allegiance: Netherlands
- Branch/service: Royal Netherlands Army
- Rank: Lieutenant-general
- Commands: 43 Mechanized Brigade

Martin Wijnen (born 1966) is a Dutch retired military officer and government official who currently serves as the Director-General of Rijkswaterstaat since January 1, 2024. A retired lieutenant general, he previously served as the fifth Commander of the Royal Netherlands Army before stepping down in 2024. Wijnen also previously served as the Commander of the 43 Mechanized Brigade.

== Biography ==
After graduating from the Royal Military Academy in civil engineering, Martin was, for his junior officer assignments, stationed in Germany as an armoured engineer. In 1992, he moved back to work in the G3 Branch of a Divisional HQ after being promoted to the rank of captain. His first deployment followed later that year as CO of a Mine Clearance Training Team in Cambodia. Two more deployments followed shortly thereafter: as liaison officer for an Emergency Relief Detachment in the Netherlands Antilles and as second-in-command of the Engineers Company of IFOR-1 in Bosnia. As of mid-1997, he attended the CGSOC at the Netherlands Defence College (NDC). He was subsequently promoted to the rank of major and served as Staff Officer for the Plans Branch, RNLA Staff. He was then selected to attend the US Army Command and General Staff Officers Course (2000-2001), Fort Leavenworth. He obtained his degree as Master of Military Art and Science (MMAS) on the basis of his research in the field of interagency cooperation. Upon his return to the Netherlands, he was promoted to the rank of lieutenant colonel and appointed as Head of the Strategy Division, NDC. During this period – in 2002 – he was deployed to CENTCOM, Tampa, as an MoD LSO for OEF and ISAF. In 2003, he again served as Staff Officer for the Plans Branch, this time at the Defence Staff. In 2005, he assumed command of 11 Armoured Engineer Battalion. In late 2007, he was promoted to colonel and appointed Head of the Policy Support Division, Commander RNLA. In 2009, he was deployed to Kandahar, Afghanistan, to serve as Chief CJ5, ISAF RC South. Following this deployment, he attended the Advanced Defence Course at the Netherlands Institute for International Relations 'Clingendael'. As of Mid 2010, he worked for the National Coordinator for Counterterrorism. In June 2012 he was promoted to the rank of brigadier general and appointed Deputy Director Plans, Defence Staff. And at 13 July 2017 he was promoted to the rank of Lieutenant-general and appointed Vice Chief of Defence. in 2019 Wijnen was appointed as the fifth Commander of the Royal Netherlands Army. Wijnen stepped down from his post in 2024, following his appointment as Director-General of Rijkswaterstaat.
