= Henry Pröpper =

Dutch military officer (1906–1995)

Lieutenant admiral Henry Pröpper
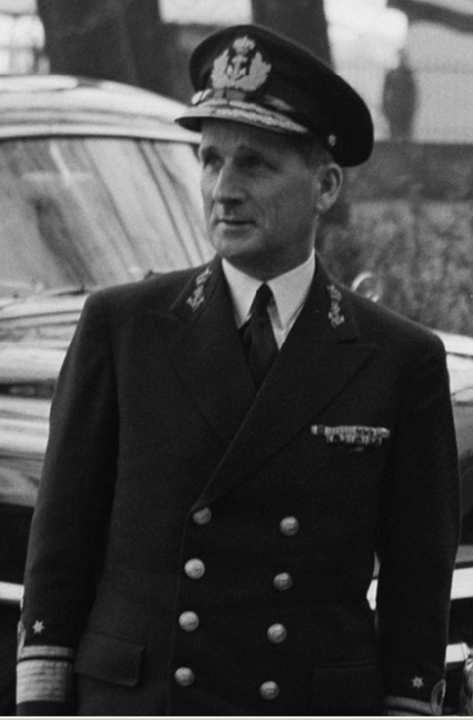

Chairman of the United Defence Staff of the Armed Forces of the Netherlands
- In office 10 May 1959 – 10 May 1962
- Preceded by: Lieutenant general Heije Schaper
- Succeeded by: General Gillis le Fèvre de Montigny

Commander of the naval forces
- In office 4 September 1956 – 4 May 1959
- Preceded by: Vice Admiral F.T. Burghard
- Succeeded by: Vice Admiral Leendert Brouwer

Personal details
- Born: Henry Herman Laurens Pröpper; 18 June 1906 Zutphen, Netherlands
- Died: 5 April 1995 (aged 88) Winssen, Netherlands

Military service
- Allegiance: Netherlands
- Branch/service: Royal Netherlands Navy
- Years of service: 1926–1962
- Rank: Lieutenant admiral
- Commands: HNLMS Soemba (1943–1944)
- Battles/wars: World War II

Lieutenant admiral Henry Pröpper (18 June 1906 – 5 April 1995) was a Dutch military officer who served as Chairman of the United Defence Staff of the Armed Forces of the Netherlands between 1959 and 1962.

== Awards and Badges ==
Knight in the Order of the Netherlands Lion
Grand Officer in the Order of Orange-Nassau met de zwaarden
Bronze Lion
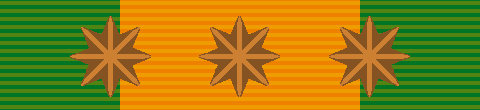
War Commemorative Cross with three clasps
Officer's Cross with yearmark XXXV
Weddingmedal (Beatrix en Claus)
(Belgium) Grand Cross in the Order of Leopold II
(Denmark) Commander 1st Class in the Order of the Dannebrog
(Iran) Commander Great Cross of the Order of Homayoun
(United States) Commander of the Legion of Merit
(Brazil) Grande-Oficial Order of Naval Merit
(Brazil) Tamandaré Merit Medal
(Sweden) Commander in the Order of the Sword

- Mentioned in Despatches (MID)...
