= Sander Schnitger =

Dutch general (1958–2020)

Alexander Schnitger
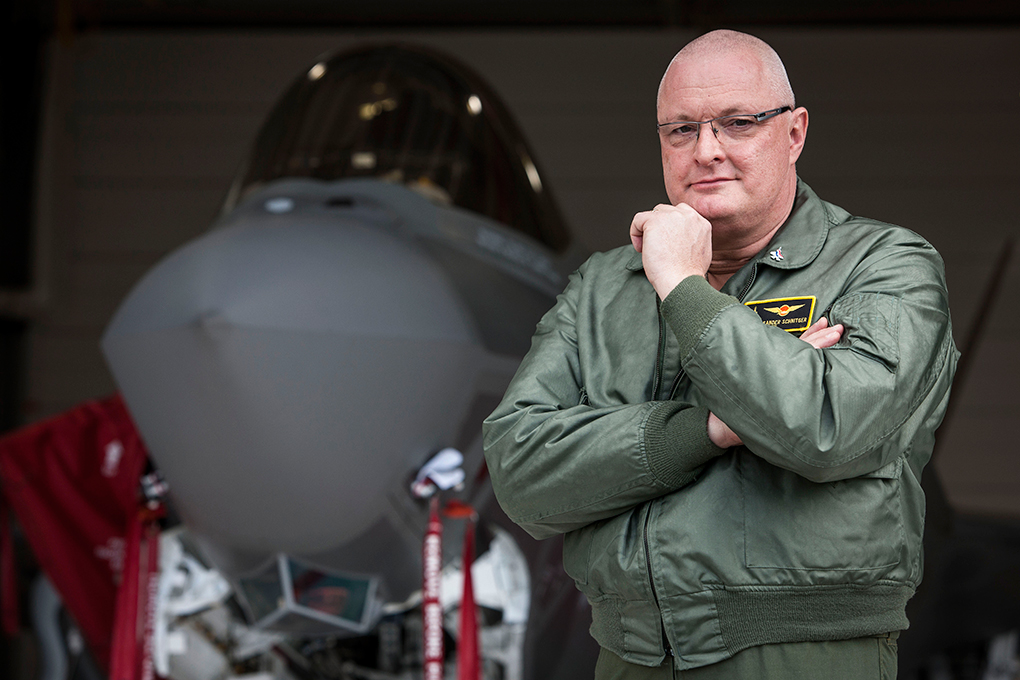
- Born: November 3, 1958; Rotterdam, South Holland, Netherlands
- Died: June 27, 2020 (aged 61)
- Allegiance: The Netherlands
- Branch: Royal Netherlands Air Force
- Service years: 1979–2016
- Rank: Lieutenant General
- Commands: Royal Netherlands Air Force; Volkel Air Base; 315 Squadron
- Conflicts: Operation Deny Flight; Operation Allied Force

Alexander Schnitger (November 11, 1958 – June 27, 2020) was a general in the Royal Netherlands Air Force who served as Commander of the Royal Netherlands Air Force.

== Biography ==
Schnitger was born in Rotterdam, and received his military education at the Military Academy in Breda. He continued his training at Sheppard Air Force Base and received his wing in March 1984. Back home in the Netherlands he was appointed pilot at the 314 squadron at Eindhoven Airport. In 1988 he was the team lead of 'Double Dutch' the NF-5 demoteam of the Royal Netherlands Air Force at that time. In 1990 he was trained for the F-16 and assigned to the 312 squadron at Volkel Air Base.

In 2001 he was appointed as Planner of the Ministry of Defence (Netherlands). In this capacity he was involved in major restructuring operation of the Dutch Armed Forces. In 2004 he was Director of Operations in the CAOC 4 in Messstetten, Germany being promoted to the rank of colonel.

Schnitger was appointed Commander of Volkel Air Base in 2005. Three years later, in 2008, he was promoted to Air commodore and appointed Director of Operations at the Air Force Staff of the Royal Netherlands Air Force. His appointment as Director of Operational Needs, Policy and Planning Division at the Ministry of Defence (Netherlands) followed in December 2009 while being promoted to Major General.

He was Commander of the Royal Netherlands Air Force from March 9, 2012, till June 10, 2016. He died at the age of 61 on June 27, 2020.

Military offices
Preceded by Jac Jansen	Commander of the Royal Netherlands Air Force; 2012-2016	Succeeded by Dennis Luyt
