= André Steur =

Officer in the Dutch military

Lieutenant-general André Steur
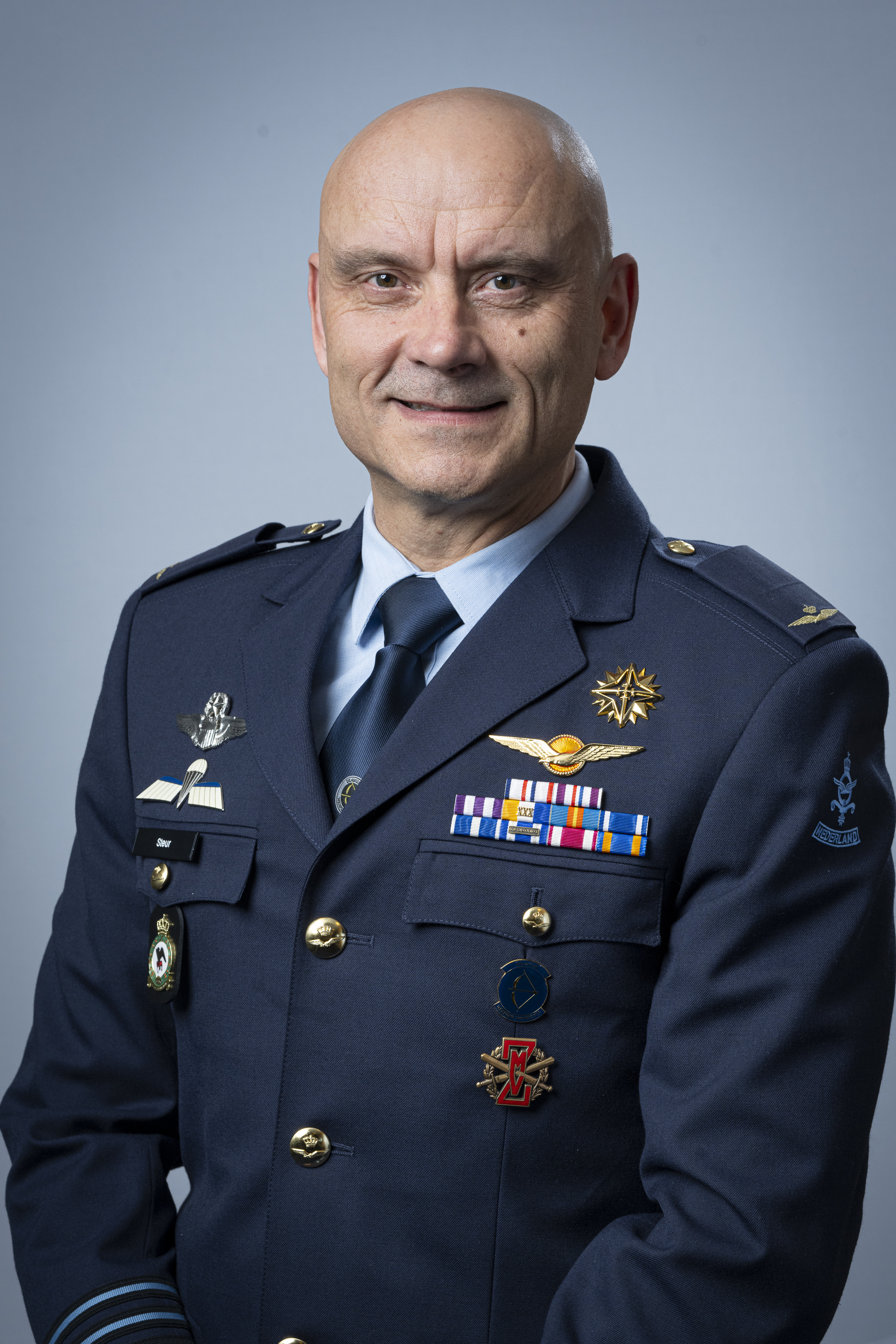

Commander of the Royal Netherlands Air and Space Force
- Incumbent
- Assumed office 14 April 2023
- Preceded by: Dennis Luyt

Personal details
- Born: 17 April 1970 (age 56) Apeldoorn, Netherlands

Military service
- Allegiance: Netherlands
- Branch/service: Royal Netherlands Air and Space Force
- Years of service: 1988-Present
- Rank: Lieutenant-General

Lieutenant-general André Steur is a Dutch military officer who has been serving as Commander of the Royal Netherlands Air and Space Force since 14 April 2023. His tactical call sign is "Jabba". Steur is married to Ronda, they have 2 sons, Ronan and Kian.

== Recent Leadership ==
On July 1, 2025, the branch officially changed its name to include "Space Force." This was a move Steur supported to show that the Netherlands is getting serious about defending satellite communications and other space-based assets. He hass often spoken about the need for European countries to work closer together to handle modern security threats.

== Career and education ==
Steur started his military career in 1988 with a study in Business Administration at the Royal Military Academy (KMA) in Breda. After graduating from the KMA in 1992, he started his pilot training (ENJJPT) at Sheppard Air Force Base, Texas. In 1994 Steur received his wings and subsequently attended initial F-16 training in Tucson, Arizona.

After returning to the Netherlands, he was stationed with 312 Squadron at Volkel Air Base. Between 1995 and 2003, Steur was deployed several times, including to Bosnia, Kosovo and Afghanistan.

In 2001, he started Fighter Weapons Instructor Training (FWIT). Steur graduated cum laude. Subsequently he was assigned to 312 Squadron as a weapons officer/flight commander.

After finishing the NLD Intermediate Command and Staff Course in 2003, Steur was stationed at Shaw Air Force Base, South Carolina. As an Ops Officer with 77th Fighter Squadron, a United States Air Force F-16CJ Block 50 squadron, he was responsible for the operational readiness of the unit.

Upon his return to the Netherlands in 2006, he was assigned to the Defence Materiel Organisation (Now the Materiel and IT Command) in The Hague, as Chief of Operations of the Lockheed Martin F-35 program. During this period, Steur was the project lead of the 2008 candidate evaluation, Chief of the F-35 Operational Analysis Team and responsible for the preparations for the F-35 Operational Test and Evaluation.

From August 2009 until July 2010, Steur attended the NLD Advanced Command and Staff Course at the Netherlands Defence College (IDL) in Rijswijk. Afterwards, he was promoted to the rank of lieutenant colonel and returned to Volkel Air Base as Commander of 312 Squadron.

In 2011, Steur assumed command of 313 Squadron. Shortly after this assignment he was deployed to Italy as the detachment commander of 1-FWE, as part of NATO’s Operation Unified Protector in Libya.

In September 2011, Steur became the Operations Group Commander at Volkel Air Base. During this period, he was also project lead for the large-scale reorganisation of Volkel Air Base, a measure that had been set out in the 2011 Policy Letter.

In 2012, he was assigned to the Defence Staff and promoted to the rank of colonel. As Chief of the Plans Integration and Coordination Division, Steur was responsible for Defence planning in the fields of investments, requirements, operating costs, personnel and national and international cooperation.

In December 2014, Steur returned to Volkel Air Base, this time as commander of the air base. This period at Volkel was characterised by the operations conducted over Iraq and Syria in the fight against ISIS and the improvement of the positioning of the air base within the local community.

In early 2016, Steur was promoted to air commodore to become the Director of Operations of the Royal Netherlands Air Force. In addition to bearing responsibility for the frequent deployment of almost all of the Royal Netherlands Air Force’s weapon systems at that time, Steur had an active role in the development of the Royal Netherlands Air Force’s vision document regarding the fifth generation air force.

In April 2019, Steur was promoted to major general and appointed to the position of Director of Operational Policy and Plans within the Directorate of Policy of the Netherlands Ministry of Defence in The Hague. Within this newly established directorate, the foundation was laid for further development of the Netherlands armed forces.

On 14 April 2023, Steur was promoted to lieutenant-general and assumed the position of Commander of the Royal Netherlands Air Force.

On 1 July 2025, Steur became the first Commander of the Royal Netherlands Air and Space Force after the branch was renamed to encompass the space domain.

== Personal life ==
Steur was born in Apeldoorn. He is married to Ronda, and they have two sons named Ronan and Kian.
