= Marcel Urlings =

Dutch general

Lieutenant general Marcel Urlings
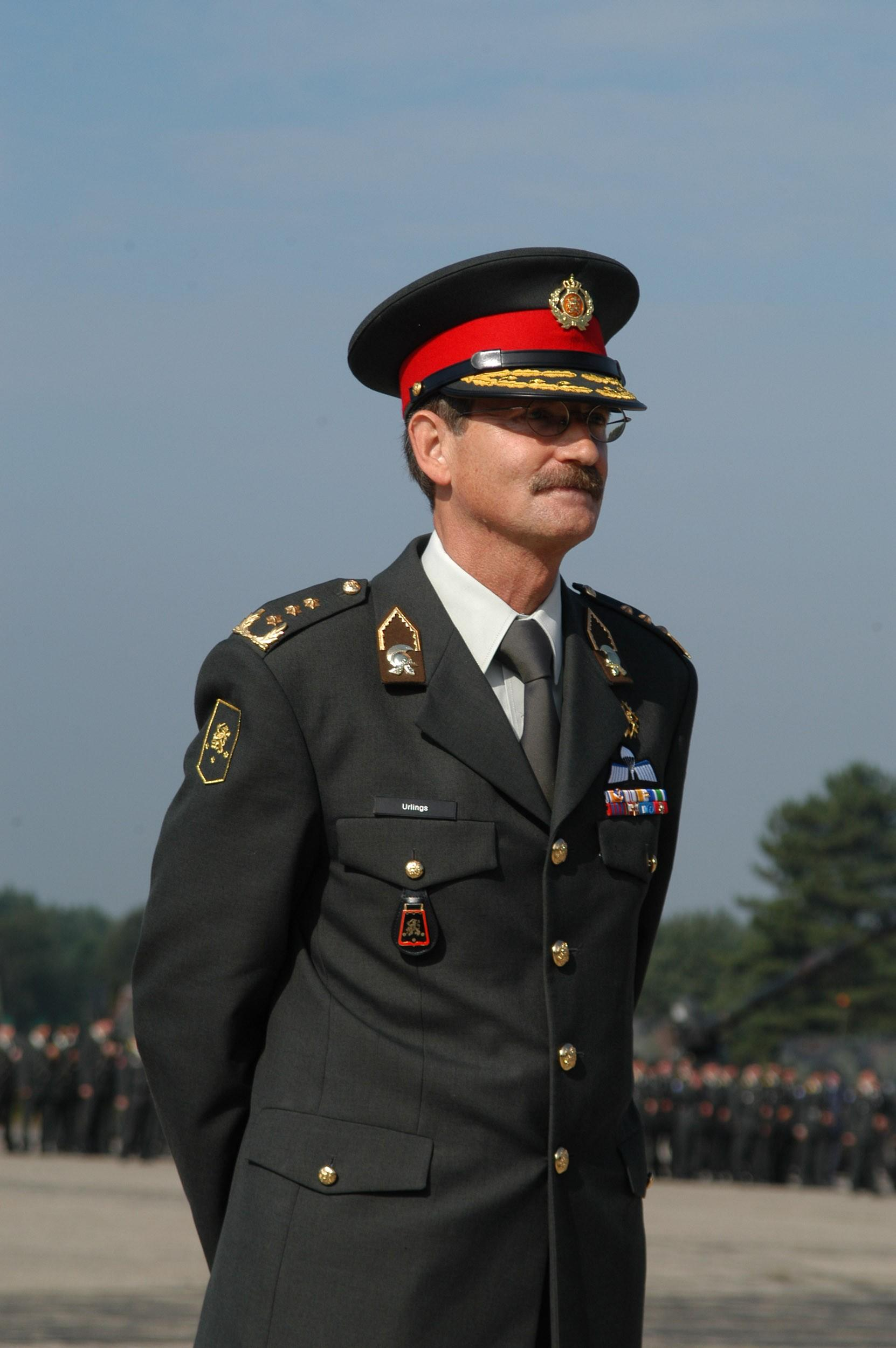

Commander of the Royal Netherlands Army
- In office 30 August 2002 – 5 September 2005
- Preceded by: Lieutenant general Ad van Baal
- Succeeded by: Lieutenant general Peter van Uhm

Personal details
- Born: 4 July 1950 (age 75) Kelmond, Netherlands

Military service
- Allegiance: Netherlands
- Branch/service: Royal Netherlands Army
- Years of service: 1973-2005
- Rank: Lieutenant-general

Lieutenant-general Marcel Urlings (born 4 July 1950) is a former Dutch military officer who served as Commander of the Royal Netherlands Army between 2002 and 2005.

He served as the commander of the First German-Dutch Army Corps in Münster. During the First Gulf War, he led an engineering battalion that provided humanitarian aid to Kurdish refugees in northern Iraq. Urlings is the vice-chairman of the AIV committee that prepared the report titled European Defence Cooperation.
