= Leo Beulen =

Dutch army commander from 2016 to 2019 (born 1960)

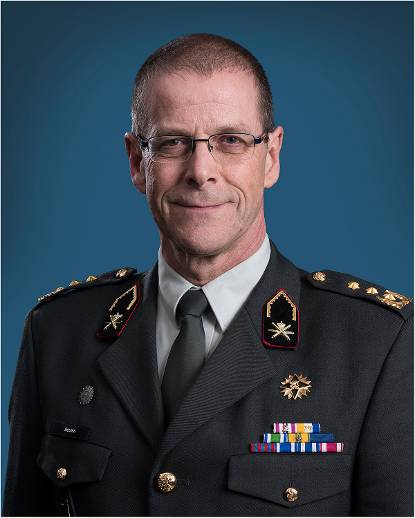

Commander of the Royal Netherlands Army
- In office 24 March 2016 – 28 August 2019
- Preceded by: L. General Mart de Kruif
- Succeeded by: L. General Martin Wijnen

Personal details
- Born: 1960 (age 65–66)

Military service
- Allegiance: The Netherlands
- Branch/service: Royal Netherlands Air and Space Force
- Years of service: 1978–2019
- Rank: Lieutenant General
- Commands: Royal Netherlands Army Allied Joint Operations NATO Air Defence Artillery Command Division Germany/Netherlands Corps ISAF HQ Afghanistan

Leo Beulen (born 1960) is a retired Dutch Lieutenant-general, who served as 4th Commander of the Royal Netherlands Army between 24 March 2016 until his retirement in 2019.

Leo Beulen, a lieutenant general of Dutch army joined the Royal Military Academy, Breda in 1978 after graduated in 1982, he was commissioned as second lieutenant and posted 12 Armoured Anti-aircraft Artillery battery, Nunspeet as platoon commander. He continued in the Netherlands Defence College for Advanced Military Studies until 1993 was promoted to major and became the head of Operations Office, G3 (NL) Corps, he was also a chief assistant to the Deputy Chief of the Defence Staff in 1995 before he proceeds for his senior staff course in Command and General Staff College, Kansas, he was made lieutenant colonel in 1998 and teaches at the Netherlands Defence College.

He also chaired the Allied Joint Operations NATO and 25 Section Armoured Anti-aircraft Artillery as commander in 1999, although, he also served the Bosnia after joining staff 1 Division Section G3 from where he returns and was posted to General Policy Division of the Army Staff, Netherlands in 2002, and was promoted to colonel in 2003. He became Commander of the Air Defence Artillery Command in 2005 from where he led the operation unit of Air Defence Artillery was moved to Air Defence Artillery Command, Noord-Brabant, when he got promoted to brigadier general, he was made the director of Joint Coordination Centre NATO, Heidelberg in 2009, also with that he head the J3 of ISAF HQ, Afghanistan and after returning, he was appointed as Operations director in the Defence Staff HQ by then as major general in 2012.

== Commands ==
As major general, he was posted as deputy commander of 1 Division Germany/Netherlands Corps, Münster in 2014. He became lieutenant general and was appointed to be Commander of the Netherlands Army on 24 March 2016.

== Families ==
He is married to Annemiek Beulen and has three children.
