= Marc van Uhm =

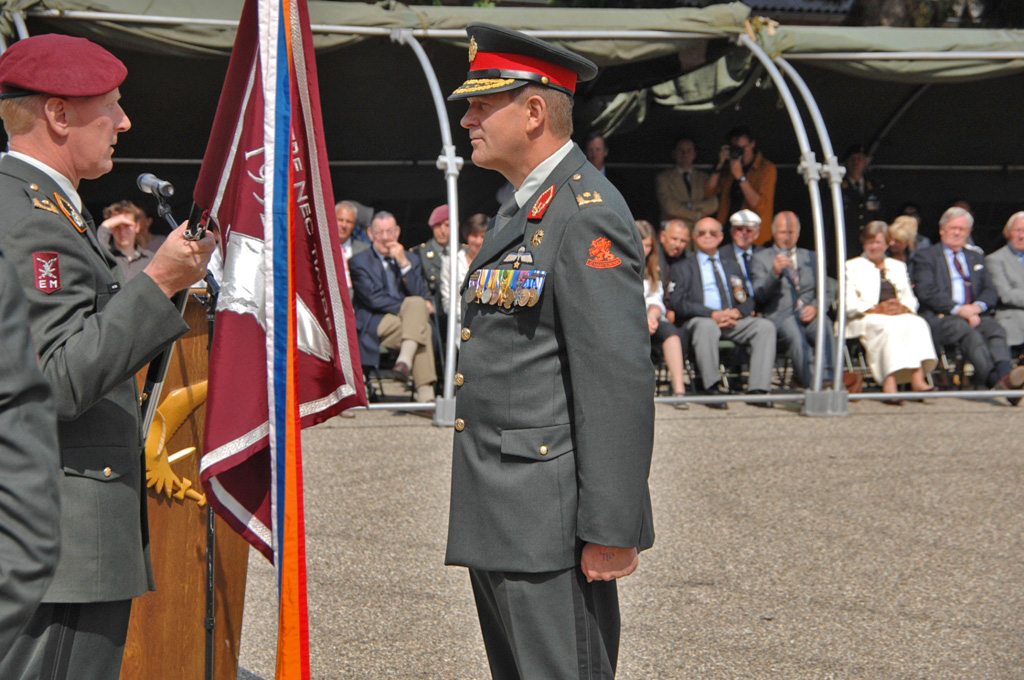
- Born: 2 July 1958 (age 67); Nijmegen, Gelderland, The Netherlands.
- Allegiance: The Netherlands
- Branch: Royal Dutch Army
- Service years: 1976–2016
- Rank: Major general
- Commands: 11 Luchtmobiele Brigade; Task Force Uruzgan; Korps Commandotroepen; Regiment Van Heutsz
- Conflicts: Stabilisation Force (SFOR); Iraq War; War in Afghanistan; First Libyan Civil War
- Awards: Order of Orange-Nassau

General Marc van Uhm is a two-star general in the Royal Netherlands Army and served as its deputy commander.

== Biography ==
Van Uhm was born in 1958, in the Dutch city of Nijmegen, the son of a baker, his brother being general Peter van Uhm. Van Uhm received his military education at the Military Academy in Breda. Later he was also educated at the Belgian Royal Military Academy and the U.S. Army War College.

General Van Uhm held several positions within the Netherlands Army and the personnel services of the Dutch Ministry of Defence before being promoted to brigadier general to become the commander of the Dutch Special Forces in 2002. During his command the Dutch Special Forces were deployed in Iraq in 2005.

After a year leading the foresight team at the Dutch Ministry of Defence he assumed command of the 11 Luchtmobiele Brigade in 2006. During this command he was deployed to South Afghanistan where he commanded the Task Force Uruzgan from August 2009.

In June 2010, Van Uhm became Director Strategic Operational Centre at Supreme Headquarters Allied Powers Europe where he acted as Chief of NATO Allied Operations during the 2011 military intervention in Libya. On 17 October 2010, Van Uhm was promoted to major general assuming the post of Deputy Commander of the Royal Netherlands Army. He retired on 28 January 2016.
