= Robbie Wijting =

Dutch military officer (1925–1986)

General Robbie Wijting
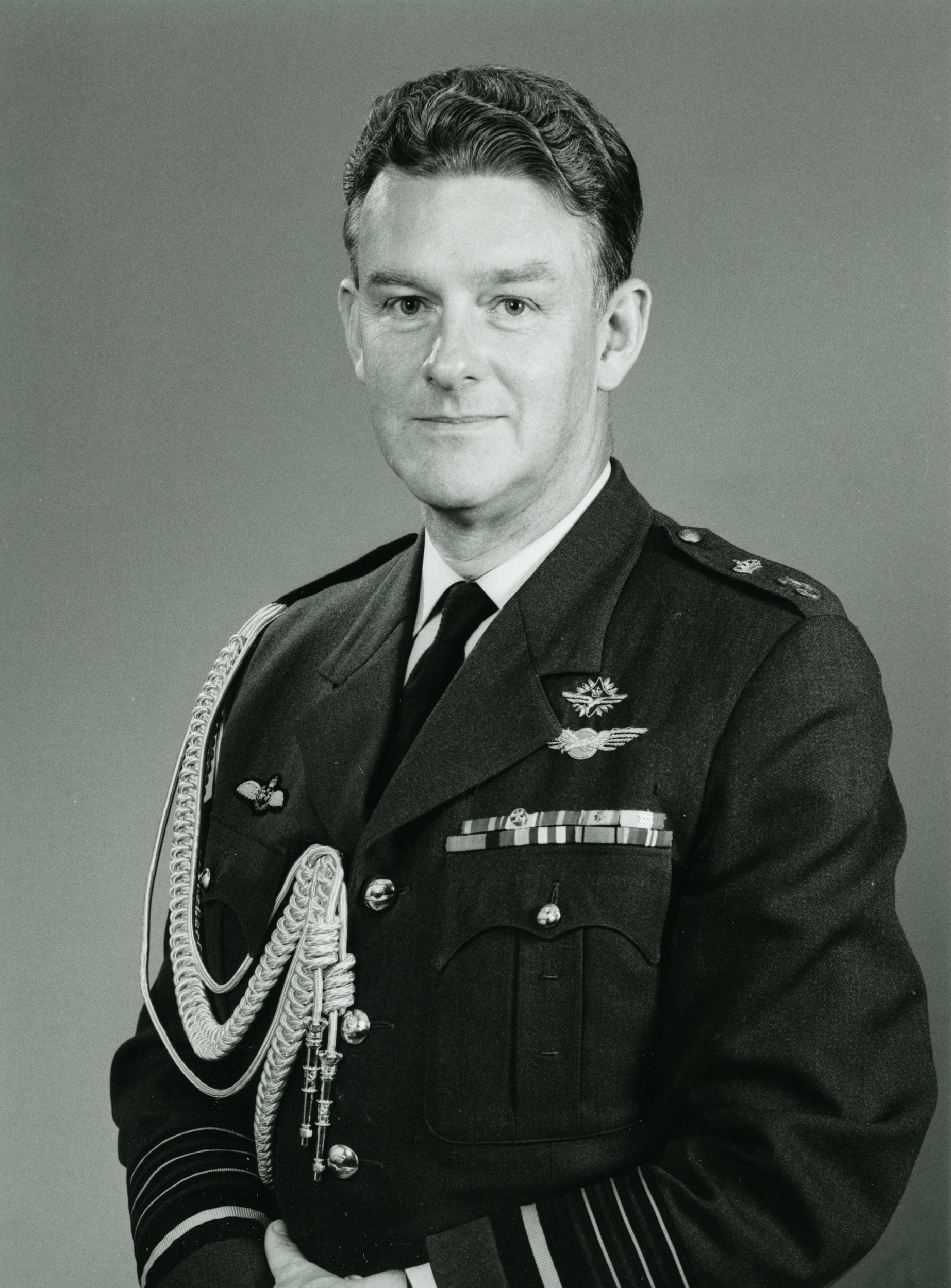

Chiefs of the Defence Staff
- In office 10 December 1976 – 1 November 1980
- Preceded by: Position established
- Succeeded by: General Cor de Jager

Chairman of the United Defence Staff of the Armed Forces of the Netherlands
- In office 1 November 1973 – 10 December 1976
- Preceded by: Lieutenant general Willem van Rijn
- Succeeded by: Position abolished

Personal details
- Born: Alexander Johannes Wilhelm Wijting; 29 June 1925 Magelang, Indonesia
- Died: 27 August 1986 (aged 61) Leeuwarden, Netherlands

Military service
- Allegiance: Netherlands
- Branch/service: Royal Netherlands Air and Space Force
- Years of service: 1942-1980
- Rank: General
- Battles/wars: World War II

General Robbie Wijting (29 June 1925 – 27 August 1986) was a Dutch military officer who served as highest-ranking member of the Dutch Armed Forces between 1973 and 1980. First as Chairman of the United Defence Staff of the Armed Forces of the Netherlands between 1973 and 1976. And served, after the renaming of the position, as Chiefs of the Defence Staff between 1976 and 1980.
