= Mart de Kruif =

Dutch general

Lieutenant general Mart de Kruif
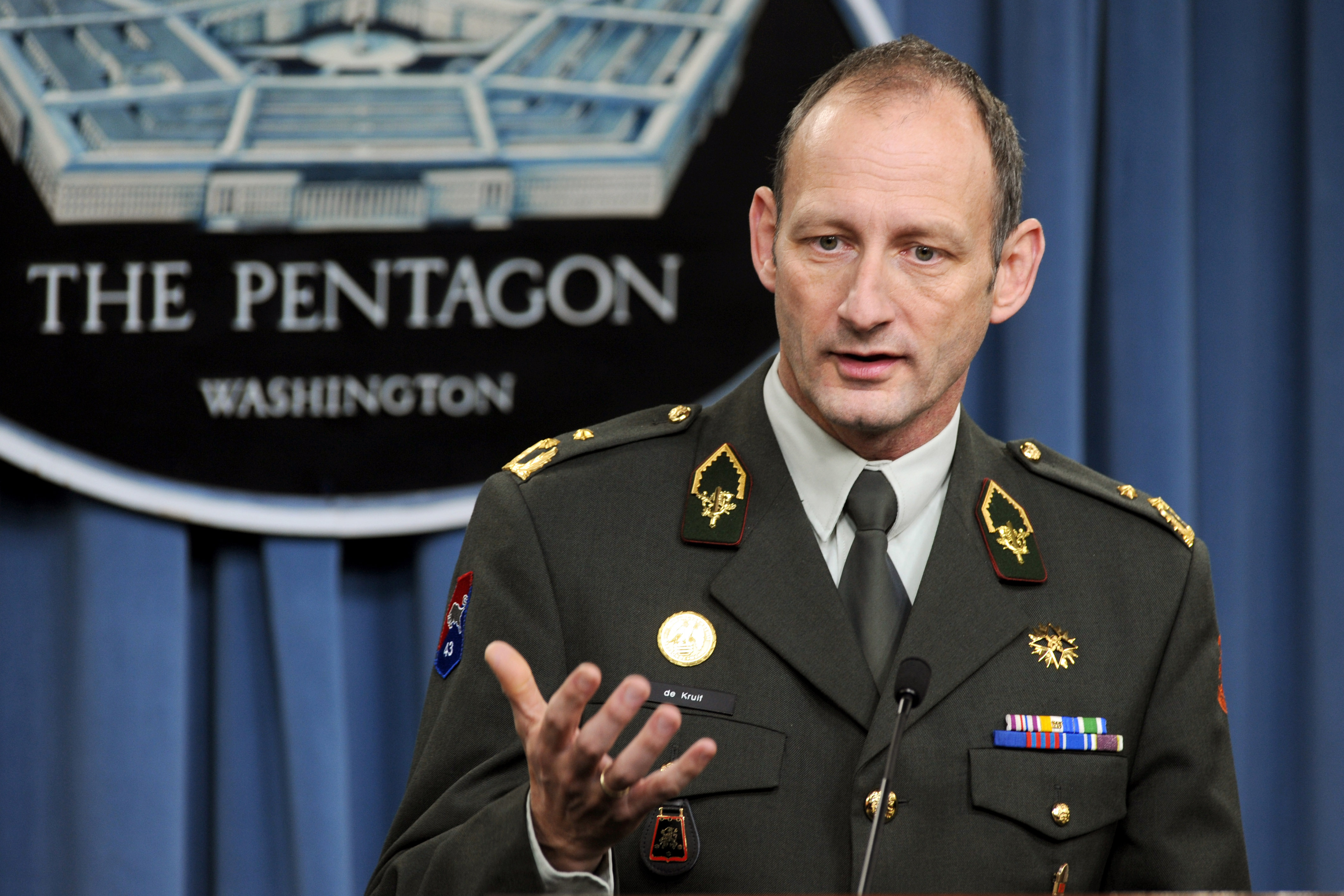

Commander of the Royal Netherlands Army
- In office 25 October 2011 – 24 March 2016
- Preceded by: Rob Bertholee
- Succeeded by: Leo Beulen

Personal details
- Born: 1 September 1958 (age 67) Apeldoorn, Netherlands
- Awards: Commander of the Order of Orange-Nassau; Meritorious Service Medal (Canada); Officer in the Legion of Honour (France); Knight Commander's Cross in the Order of Merit of the Federal Republic of Germany; Commander of the Legion of Merit

Military service
- Allegiance: Netherlands
- Branch/service: Royal Netherlands Army
- Years of service: 1981–2016
- Rank: Lieutenant General
- Commands: Royal Netherlands Army; ISAF Regional Command South; 43rd Mechanized Brigade; 42 Pantserinfanteriebataljon Limburgse Jagers
- Battles/wars: Stabilisation Force (SFOR); War in Afghanistan

Mart de Kruif MSM is a retired Dutch Lieutenant-general in the Royal Netherlands Army who served as the 3rd Commander of the Royal Netherlands Army until his retirement in 2016. He was succeeded by lieutenant general Leo Beulen.

== Biography ==
Mart de Kruif received his military education at the Royal Military Academy in Breda. Later he was also educated at the Bundeswehr Command and Staff College and the United States Army War College. He held several positions within the Royal Netherlands Army before he became commander of the 43rd Mechanized Brigade in Havelte in 2007.

On 1 November 2008 he was promoted to Major General. On the same day he took over the Regional Command South (RC-S) of the International Security Assistance Force (ISAF) in Afghanistan from Canadian Major General Marc Lessard. Under his command the size of RC-S doubled to 40,000 troops. He held this command until 1 November 2009, when he was succeeded by British Major General Nick Carter.

From May 2010 until October 2011 he served as the Deputy Commander of the Royal Netherlands Army. Promoted to Lieutenant General on 17 October 2011, De Kruif assumed the post of Commander of the Royal Netherlands Army on 25 October. He retired on 24 March 2016.

Military offices
| Preceded by Rob Bertholee | Commander of the Royal Netherlands Army; 2011–2016 | Succeeded by Leo Beulen |
