= Jan Swillens =

Dutch military officer (born 1967)

Lieutenant general Jan Swillens
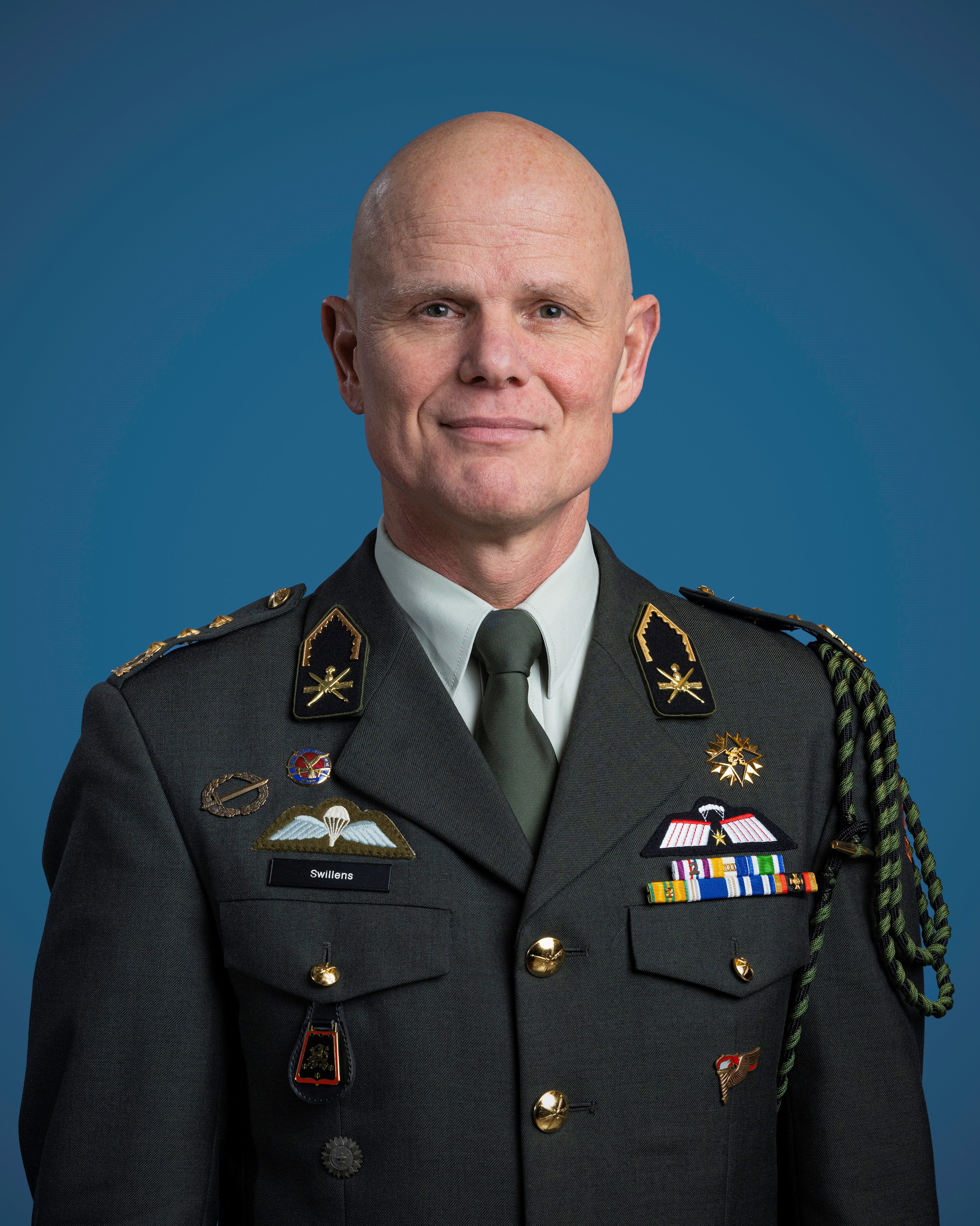

Commander of the Royal Netherlands Army
- Incumbent
- Assumed office 8 March 2024
- Preceded by: Martin Wijnen

Personal details
- Born: 20 August 1967 (age 59) Nijkerk, Netherlands

Military service
- Allegiance: Netherlands
- Branch/service: Royal Netherlands Army
- Rank: Lieutenant general
- Unit: Korps Commandotroepen

Lieutenant general Jan Renger Swillens (20 August 1967) is a Royal Netherlands Army officer and Commander of the Royal Netherlands Army since 2024.

== Military career ==
Swillens started his military career in 1985 as a infantry cadet at the Koninklijke Militaire Academie (KMA), after graduating from the KMA, Swillens enlisted in the Korps Commandotroepen (KCT), after earning his green baret, Swillens was appointed as platoon commander the KCT.

In 2012 Swillens was appointed Commandant of the Korps Commandotroepen (KCT), focusing on improving relations of the commandos in the media.

In 2016 Swillens was appointed Commandant of the 43rd Mechanized Brigade.

In 2019 Swillens was appointed Director of the Dutch Military Intelligence and Security Service and subsequently promoted to Major general.

In 2024 Swillens succeeded Martin Wijnen as Commander of the Royal Netherlands Army.
