= Peter van Uhm =

Dutch general

General Peter van Uhm
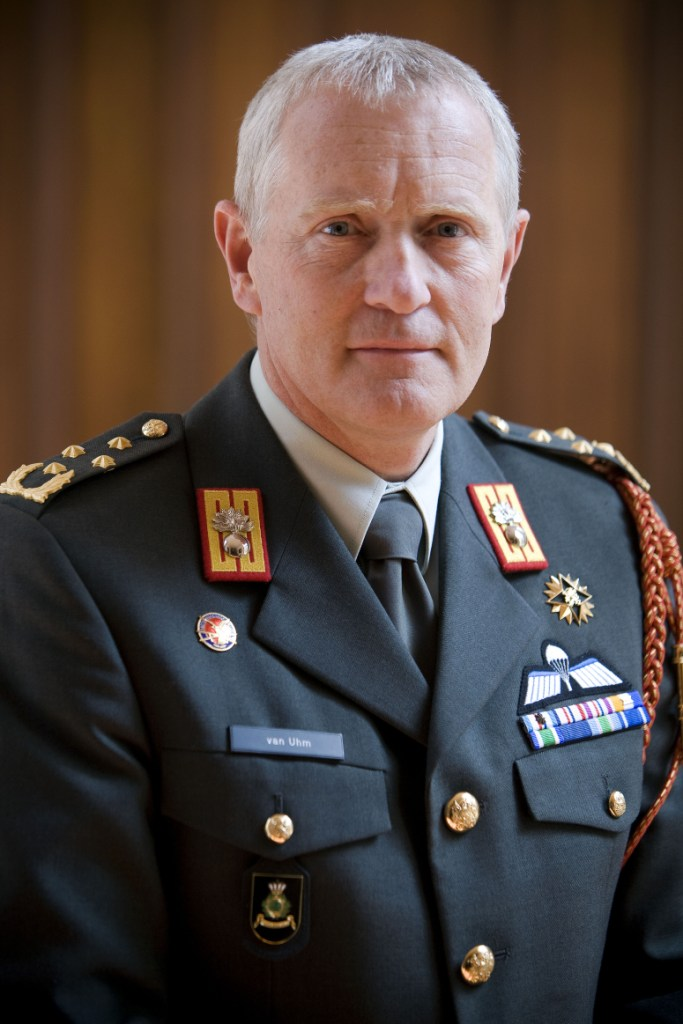
- Peter van Uhm in 2008

Chief of Defence
- In office 17 April 2008 – 28 June 2012
- Preceded by: General Dick Berlijn
- Succeeded by: General Tom Middendorp

Commander of the Royal Netherlands Army
- In office 5 September 2005 – 13 March 2008
- Preceded by: Lieutenant general Marcel Urlings
- Succeeded by: Lieutenant general Rob Bertholee

Personal details
- Born: 15 June 1955 (age 70) Nijmegen, Netherlands

Military service
- Allegiance: Netherlands
- Branch/service: Royal Netherlands Army
- Years of service: 1972–2012
- Rank: General
- Commands: Chief of Defence; Commander of the Royal Netherlands Army; 11th Airmobile Brigade
- Battles/wars: Cold War; Lebanon (UNIFIL); Bosnian War; SFOR; War on terror; Iraq War; War in Afghanistan

Petrus Johannes Mathias "Peter" van Uhm (born 15 June 1955) is a retired Royal Netherlands Army general. He served as Chief of Defence of the Armed forces of the Netherlands from 17 April 2008 until 28 June 2012. He previously served as the Commander of the Royal Netherlands Army from 5 September 2005 until 13 March 2008.

== Biography ==
Van Uhm was born in the Dutch city of Nijmegen, the son of a baker. He is the elder brother of Marc van Uhm, who is also a general in the Royal Netherlands Army. He was first attracted to a career in the army in high school, where he heard stories about the liberation of Nijmegen in 1944. He enrolled at the Koninklijke Militaire Academie in Breda in 1972, attending the Infantry officer training course. He completed his training within the required four years and was posted to the 48th Mechanised Infantry Battalion in 's-Hertogenbosch in 1976. He served there until 1982, with a short break in 1978 during which he served as a platoon commander at the Royal Military School in Weert. In 1982 Van Uhm was reassigned to the 43rd Mechanised Infantry Battalion as a Company Commander for Company A; he was deployed to Lebanon in this role in 1983 as part of the UNIFIL mission. Returning to The Netherlands a captain, he was posted the 48th Armoured Infantry Battalion for a short stint.

From 1984 to 1986 Van Uhm attended the Staff Service and Advanced Military Studies courses at the Royal Netherlands Army Staff College at The Hague. Following this (and a promotion to major) he was assigned to the First Division staff as deputy Head of Operations. He then held the position of Head of the Training Policy Office at the Royal Netherlands Army Staff and (following promotion to lieutenant-colonel), Head of the Training Section.

In 1991 Van Uhm spent some time working at the Ministry of Foreign Affairs as a liaison officer, aiding in the preparation of the European Community Monitoring Mission (ECMM). Following that he served as head of the Plans Division at the staff of Dutch First Corps. In 1994, following the creation of the Dutch 11th Infantry Battalion Air Assault Brigade, Van Uhm was appointed Battalion Commander of their Grenadiers and Rifles Guards. He served there for a year, until his promotion to full colonel in 1995, when he was transferred to the Personal Office of the Commander of the Royal Netherlands Army, as Head of the Office. He then served as Head of the General Policy Division of the Army Staff and then as Head of the Military-Strategic Affairs Division of the Defense Staff.

At the turn of the millennium Van Uhm, then a brigadier general, was assigned to headquarters of the Stabilisation Force SFOR in Sarajevo as Assistant Chief of Staff for Joint Military Affairs. Van Uhm assumed command of the entire 11th Air Assault Brigade in July 2001 and of the 11th Air Manoeuvre Brigade following that. (The Air Manoeuvre Brigade was a combined force consisting of the Air Assault Brigade and the Tactical Helicopter Group).

Completing two years as Commander of the Air Assault Brigade, Van Uhm was subsequently appointed Deputy Director of Policy and Planning with the Royal Dutch Army staff in 2003. He was appointed Director (with a promotion to major general) in July 2004. He held this position until 8 July 2005, when he succeeded Major General Leen Noordzij as commanding officer of Operational Command ‘7 December’. This was followed shortly, on 5 September 2005, by promotion to Commander of the Royal Netherlands Army (Commandant der Landstrijdkrachten, C-LAS). Commensurate with this office he was promoted to lieutenant general and held the post until 13 March 2008, when he was succeeded by Lieutenant General Rob Bertholee. He was awarded the Bronzen Soldaat at that time, for his exceptional service to the army.

On 17 April 2008, Van Uhm was promoted to full general and appointed Chief of Defence (CHOD).

The Minister of Defence, Hans Hillen, announced on 28 September 2011 that Van Uhm will stand down in 2012, and be succeeded by Major General Tom Middendorp.

Van Uhm transferred command to Middendorp on 28 June 2012. During the transfer-of-command ceremony he was made a Commander in the Military Division of the Order of Orange-Nassau and was made a special aide-de-camp to Queen Beatrix.

On 30 April 2013, Van Uhm served as King of Arms during the Investiture Ceremony of King Willem-Alexander of the Netherlands.

=== Loss of Van Uhm's son ===
Van Uhm's promotion to CHOD was accompanied by personal tragedy as, on 18 April 2008, his son First Lieutenant Dennis van Uhm was killed in a roadside bombing in Uruzgan, the southern province of Afghanistan. A spokesman for the Taliban claimed that militants had known about his movements and had targeted him. The Dutch government rejected this claim. Prime Minister Jan Peter Balkenende said in The Hague: "Our information is that there is no indication of any link between this cowardly deed and the fact that it was the son of the defense chief."

== Honours and awards ==
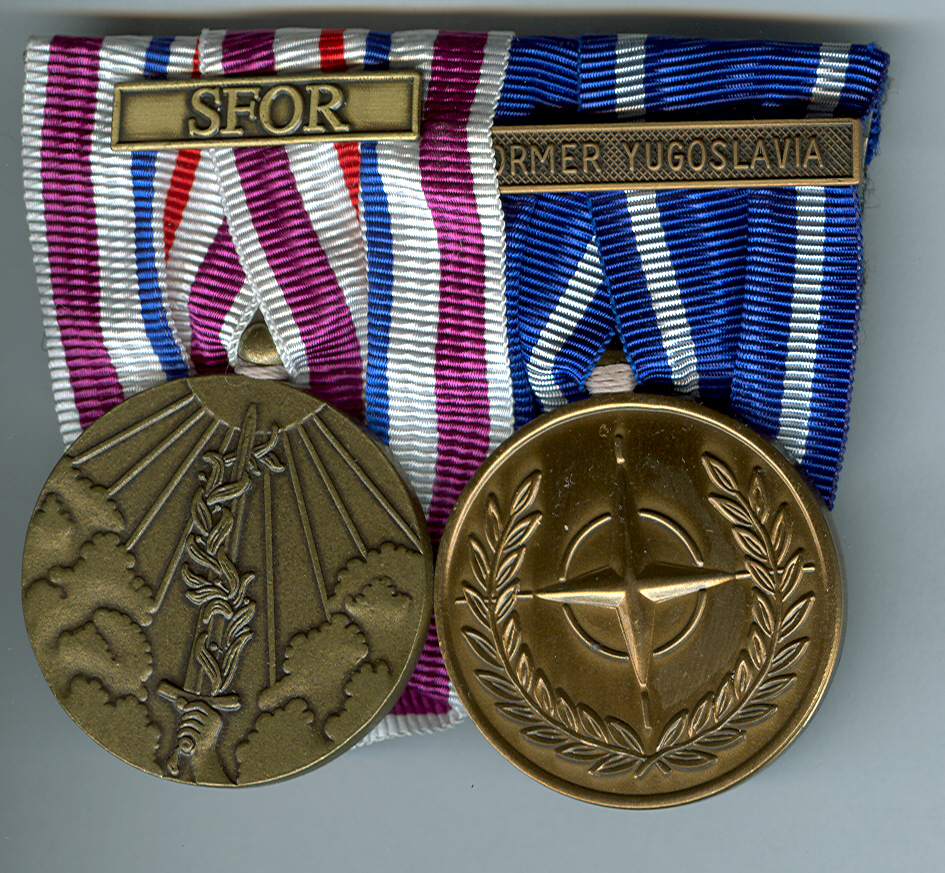
Dutch (SFOR)* and NATO (SFOR)** medals for Peace Keeping Operations in the former Yugoslavia

(Dutch) Commander of the Order of Orange-Nassau (Military Division)
(Dutch Commemorative Medal for) UN Peace Keeping Operations in Lebanon, March 1979 - October 1983 (UNIFIL)
(Dutch Commemorative Medal for) Multinational Peace Keeping Operations in the former Yugoslavia
(Dutch Commemorative Medal for) Peace Keeping Operations (SFOR)*
(Dutch Commemorative medal for) Long Service as an Officer
(Dutch) Army medal
Medal of Capability from the Dutch Olympic Committee
Medal of the United Nations Interim Force in Lebanon (UNIFIL)
NATO Medal (SFOR - former Yugoslavia)**
French commemorative medal (France)
Commander of the Naval Order of Merit (Chile)
Commander of the Order of the Polar Star (Sweden)
Officer of the Legion of Honour (France)
Honorary Officer of the Order of Australia (Military Division)
Mir Masjedi khan Ghazi (Afghanistan)

Military offices
Preceded by Leen Noordzij	Commander of the 11th Airmobile Brigade; 2001–2003	Succeeded by Koen Gijsberts
New title	Commander of the Royal Netherlands Army; 2005–2008	Succeeded by Rob Bertholee
Preceded by Dick Berlijn	Chief of Defence of the Armed forces of the Netherlands; 2008–2012	Succeeded by Tom Middendorp
