= Gillis le Fèvre de Montigny =

Dutch military officer (1901–1982)

General Gillis le Fèvre de Montigny
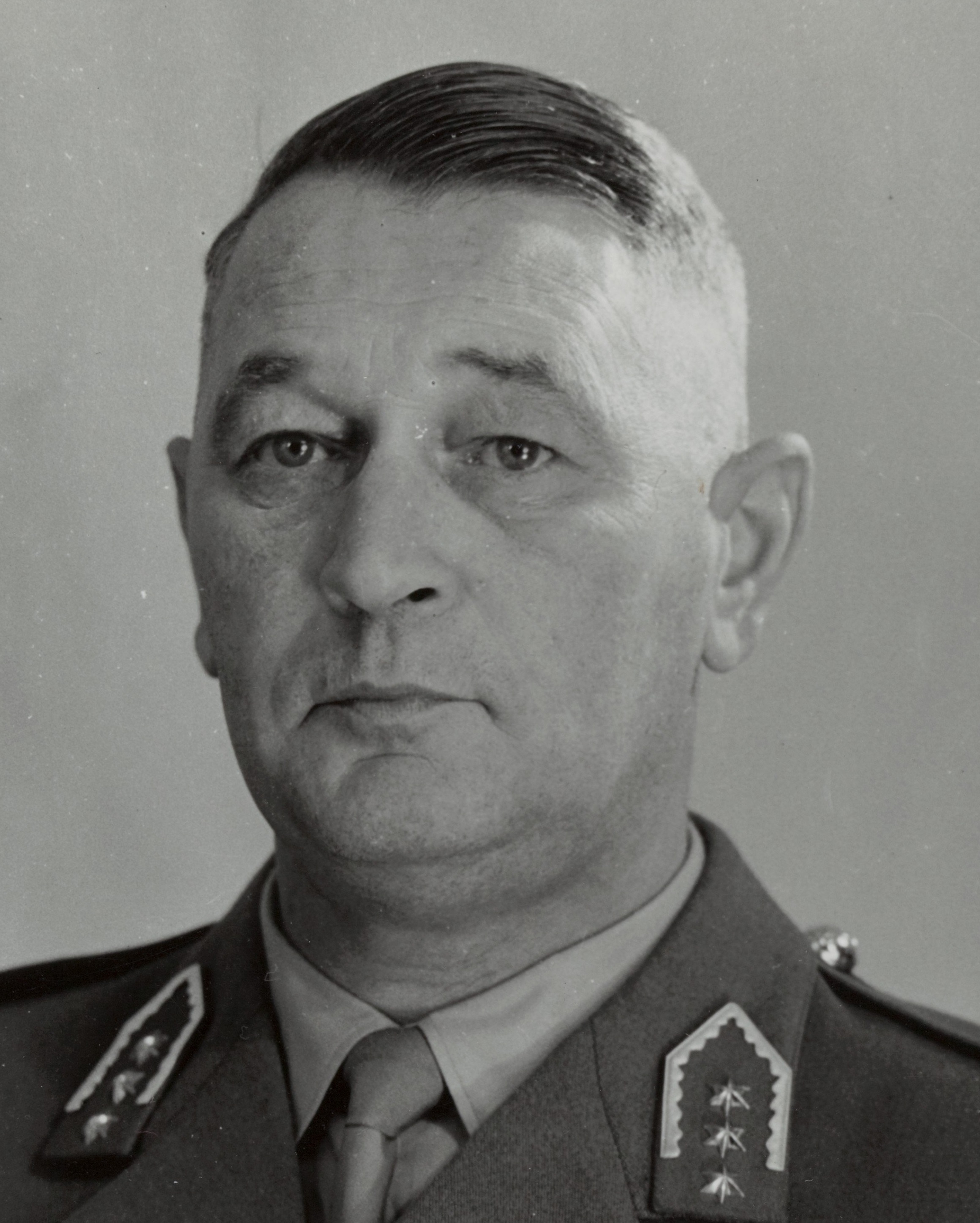

Chairman of the United Defence Staff of the Armed Forces of the Netherlands
- In office 10 May 1962 – 5 May 1965
- Preceded by: Lieutenant admiral Henry Pröpper
- Succeeded by: General Hein Zielstra

Chief of Defence
- In office 1957–1962
- Preceded by: General Ben Hasselman
- Succeeded by: Lieutenant General A.V. van den Wall Bake

Personal details
- Born: Gillis Johannis le Fèvre de Montigny; 18 December 1901 Amsterdam, Netherlands
- Died: 1 January 1982 (aged 80) The Hague, Netherlands

Military service
- Allegiance: Netherlands
- Branch/service: Royal Netherlands Army
- Years of service: ?-1965
- Rank: General
- Battles/wars: World War II; Battle of the Grebbeberg

General Gillis le Fèvre de Montigny (18 December 1901 – 1 January 1982) was a Dutch military officer who served as Chairman of the United Defence Staff of the Armed Forces of the Netherlands between 1962 and 1965.
