= Hugo van den Wall Bake =

Dutch military officer (1913–1981)

Lieutenant admiral Hugo van den Wall Bake
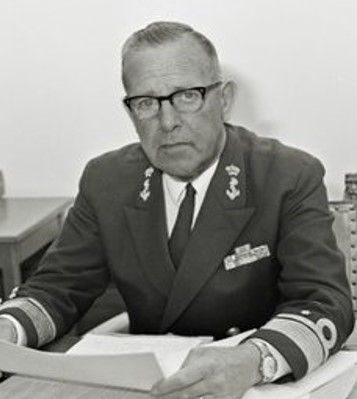

Chairman of the United Defence Staff of the Armed Forces of the Netherlands
- In office 5 January 1969 – 15 January 1972
- Preceded by: General Hein Zielstra
- Succeeded by: Lieutenant general Willem van Rijn

Personal details
- Born: Hugo Maurice van den Wall Bake; 18 March 1913 Arnhem, Netherlands
- Died: 22 January 1981 (aged 67) Velp, Netherlands

Military service
- Allegiance: Netherlands
- Branch/service: Royal Netherlands Navy
- Years of service: 1933-1971
- Rank: Lieutenant admiral
- Battles/wars: World War II

Lieutenant admiral Hugo van den Wall Bake (18 March 1913 – 22 January 1981) was a Dutch military officer who served as Chairman of the United Defence Staff of the Armed Forces of the Netherlands between 1969 and 1972.
