= Hendrik Johan Kruls =

Dutch military officer (1902–1975)

General Hendrik Johan Kruls
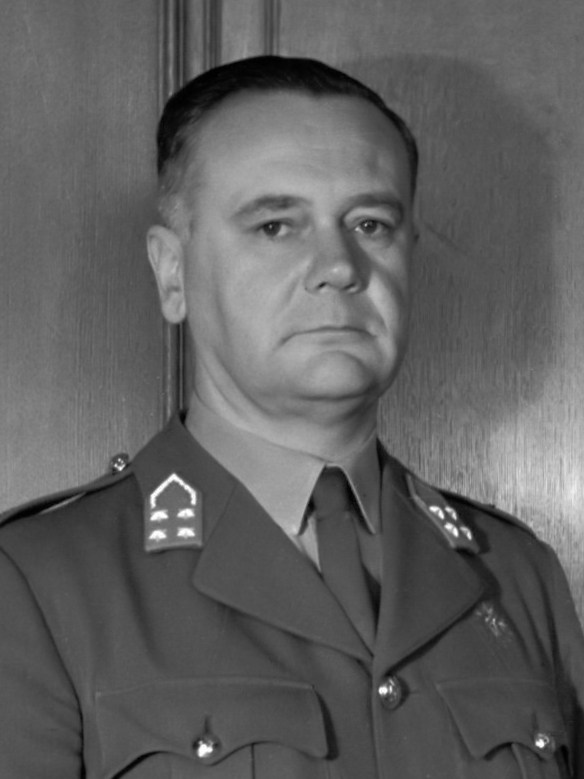

Chairman of the United Defence Staff of the Armed Forces of the Netherlands
- In office 1 January 1949 – 5 January 1951
- Preceded by: Position established
- Succeeded by: Vice admiral Edzard Jacob van Holthe

Commander-in-chief of the Armed forces
- In office 13 September 1945 – 1 January 1949
- Preceded by: Prince Bernhard of Lippe-Biesterfeld
- Succeeded by: Position abolished

Personal details
- Born: 1 August 1902 Amsterdam, Netherlands
- Died: 13 December 1975 (aged 73) The Hague, Netherlands

Military service
- Allegiance: Netherlands
- Branch/service: Royal Netherlands Army
- Years of service: 1919-1951
- Rank: General
- Battles/wars: World War II

General Hendrik Johan Kruls (1 August 1902 – 13 December 1975) was a Dutch military officer who served as highest-ranking member of the Dutch Armed Forces between 1945 and 1951. First as Commander-in-chief of the Armed forces between 1945 and 1949. And served, after the renaming of the position, as Chairman of the United Defence Staff of the Armed Forces of the Netherlands between 1949 and 1951.
