= Dennis Luyt =

Retired Dutch General

Lieutenant general Dennis Luyt
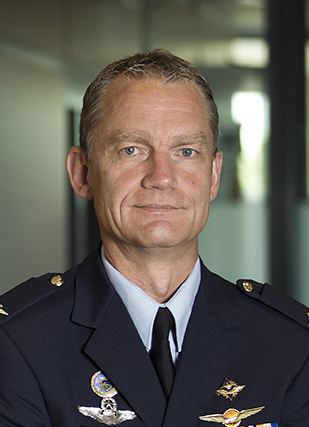
- Luyt in 2016 just after starting his position as commander.

Commander of the Royal Netherlands Air Force
- In office 10 June 2016 – 14 April 2023
- Preceded by: Sander Schnitger
- Succeeded by: André Steur

Personal details
- Born: 19 September 1963 (age 62)

Military service
- Allegiance: Netherlands
- Branch/service: Royal Netherlands Air Force
- Rank: Lieutenant general

Dennis Luyt (19 September 1963) is a retired Dutch Lieutenant general in the Royal Netherlands Air Force who served as Commander of the Royal Netherlands Air Force from 10 June 2016 until his retirement on 14 April 2023.

Military offices
Preceded by Sander Schnitger	Commander of the Royal Netherlands Air Force; 2016–2023	Succeeded by André Steur
