= Jac Jansen =

Dutch airforce marshal

Commander of the Royal Netherlands Air Force
- 15th
- In office 29 May 2008 – 9 March 2012
- Preceded by: Lt. Gen. Hans de Jong
- Succeeded by: Lt. Gen. Sander Schnitger

Director of Maastricht Upper Area Control Centre
- In office 1 April 2012 – 2017
- Preceded by: Karl-Heinz Kloos
- Succeeded by: Ian Middleton

Chairman Supervisory Board of NLR
- Incumbent
- Assumed office 21 September 2018
- Preceded by: Arie Kraaijeveld

Chairman Netherlands Aerospace Fund Foundation
- Incumbent
- Assumed office 27 June 2020
- Preceded by: Alexander Schnitger

Personal details
- Born: 29 February 1956 (age 70) Maastricht, Netherlands

Military service
- Allegiance: Netherlands
- Branch/service: Royal Netherlands Air and Space Force
- Years of service: 1979–2018
- Rank: Lieutenant General
- Commands: Royal Netherlands Air Force NATO Air Component 306 Squadron Twenthe Air Base
- Battles/wars: Operation Deny Flight Operation Allied Force

Jac Jansen (born February 29, 1956) is a retired lieutenant general of the Royal Netherlands Air Force (RNLAF). He was the Commander of the RNLAF from May 2008 until he left the service in 2012, he was director of Maastricht Upper Area Control Centre in April 2012 and left in 2017. As of September 21, 2018 he chaires the Supervisory Board of Royal NLR.

Born in Maastricht, Limburg, Jansen enrolled in the Royal Military Academy, Breda as an officer cadet in 1975. He had his pilot training in Canada, after receiving his military pilot certificate with his conversion to the NF-5 at Twenthe Air Base in 1981, he was posted to Eindhoven Air Base in 1981 spending seven years as an operational pilot in 314 Squadron. He later went on to the Air Force Staff School for a high staff course in 1988 to 1990. After his conversion to the F-16 Fighting Falcon he was made the commanding officer of 306 Squadron at Volkel Air Base. He later became the Section Chief for National Plans in RNLAF HQ, The Hague and the chief operations officer at Twenthe Air Base during the summer of 1995, later he was assigned commanding officer until the summer of 1996 for the Dutch F-16 detachment stationed at Villafranca Air Base Italy.

== Commands ==
After his promotion to air commodore (brigadier general) in 1997 he was appointed Twenthe Air Base commander until 2000 when he left for the NATO Defence College, Rome and after completing his course, he continued in the Ministry of Defence in The Hague where he chaired the Defence Crisis Response Centre before being posted to serve as Chief of National Plans Branch in RNLAF headquarters until 2004, although he was later deputy director for Plans and Policy, HQ Air Force in Hague before moving to serve as Head of Project Group SAMSON in the Ministry of Defence until in 2007 left for the NATO Air Command at Ramstein Air Base, Germany and was made the chief of staff until he was promoted to as lieutenant general in May 2008 to serve as Commander of the RNLAF.
