= Fons Aler =

Dutch military officer (1896–1981)

Lieutenant general Fons Aler
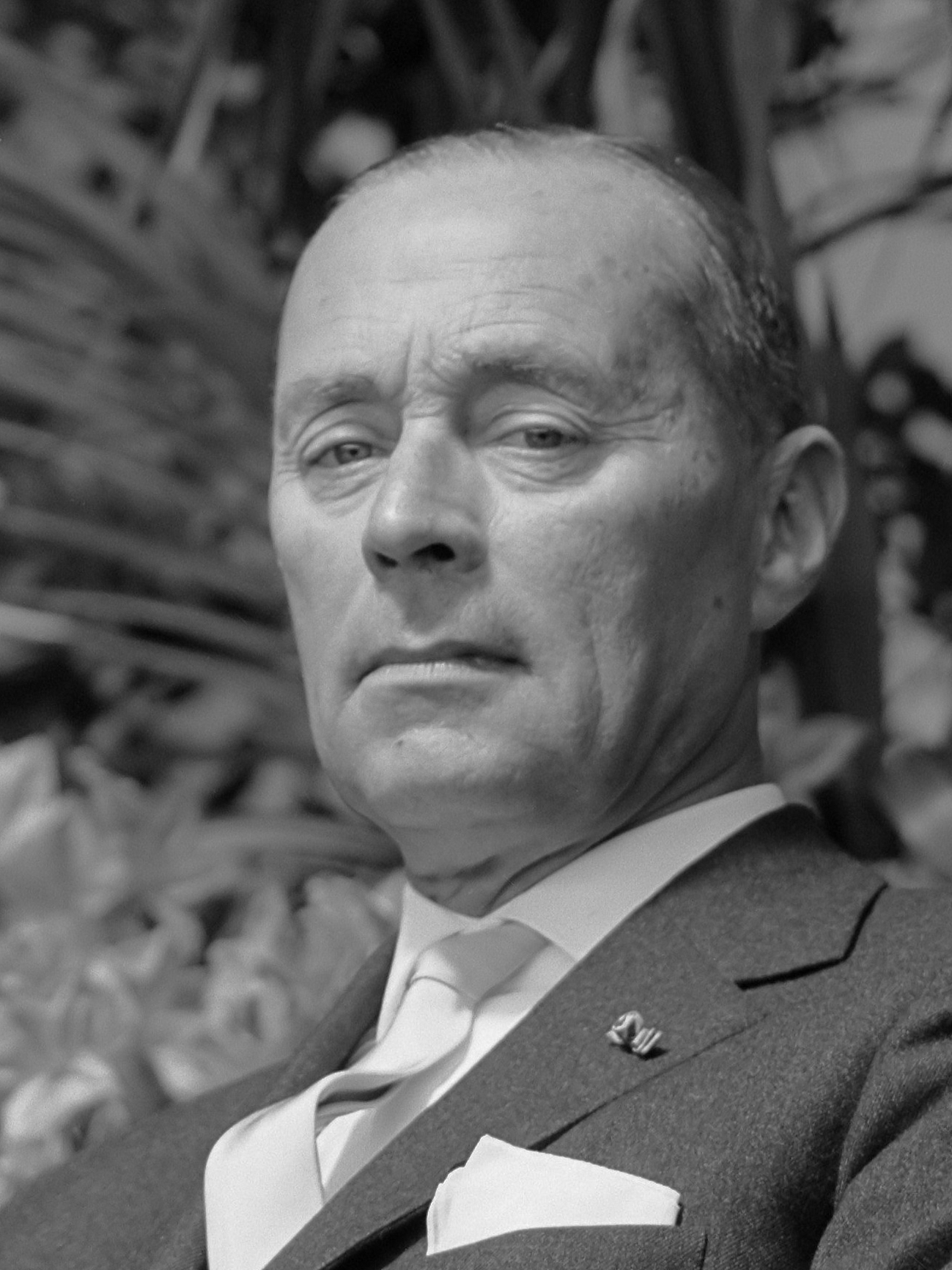

Chairman of the United Defence Staff of the Armed Forces of the Netherlands
- In office 10 January 1953 – 1 October 1953
- Preceded by: Vice admiral Edzard Jacob van Holthe
- Succeeded by: General Ben Hasselman

Personal details
- Born: Izaäk Alphonse Aler; 3 May 1896 Amsterdam, Netherlands
- Died: 21 December 1981 (aged 85) Rolde, Netherlands

Military service
- Allegiance: Netherlands
- Branch/service: Royal Netherlands Air and Space Force
- Years of service: 1917-1953
- Rank: Lieutenant general
- Battles/wars: World War II

Lieutenant general Fons Aler ( 3 May 1896 – 21 December 1981) was a Dutch military officer who served as Chairman of the United Defence Staff of the Armed Forces of the Netherlands between January 1953 and October 1953. In 1997 a Fokker 50 of the Royal Netherlands Air Force was named after Aler.
