= Hans Couzy =

Dutch military officer (1940–2019)

Lieutenant general Hans Couzy
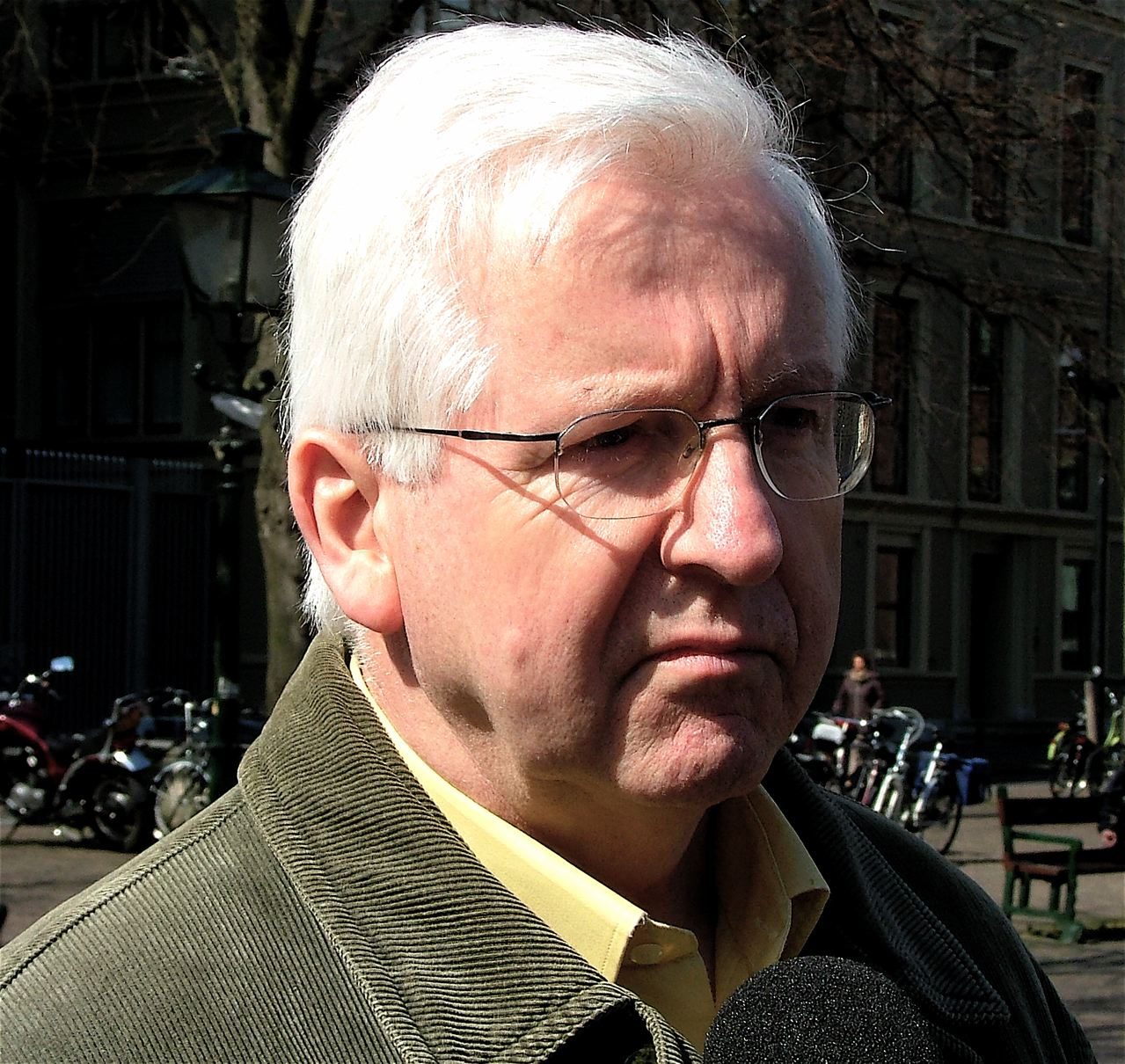

Commander of the Royal Netherlands Army
- In office 10 september 1992 – 4 juli 1996
- Preceded by: Lieutenant general Rien Wilmink
- Succeeded by: Lieutenant general Maarten Schouten

Personal details
- Born: Henri Andre (Hans) Couzy; 23 September 1940 The Hague, Netherlands
- Died: 10 March 2019 (aged 78) The Hague, Netherlands

Military service
- Allegiance: Netherlands
- Branch/service: Royal Netherlands Army
- Years of service: 1957-1996
- Rank: Lieutenant-general
- Battles/wars: Fall of Srebrenica

Lieutenant-general Hans Couzy (23 September 1940 - 10 March 2019) was a Dutch military officer who served as Commander of the Royal Netherlands Army between 1996 and 2001. He was commander during the Srebrenica massacre in July 1995.
