= Rob Bertholee =

Head of the General Intelligence and Security Service (2011–2018)

Lieutenant general Rob Bertholee
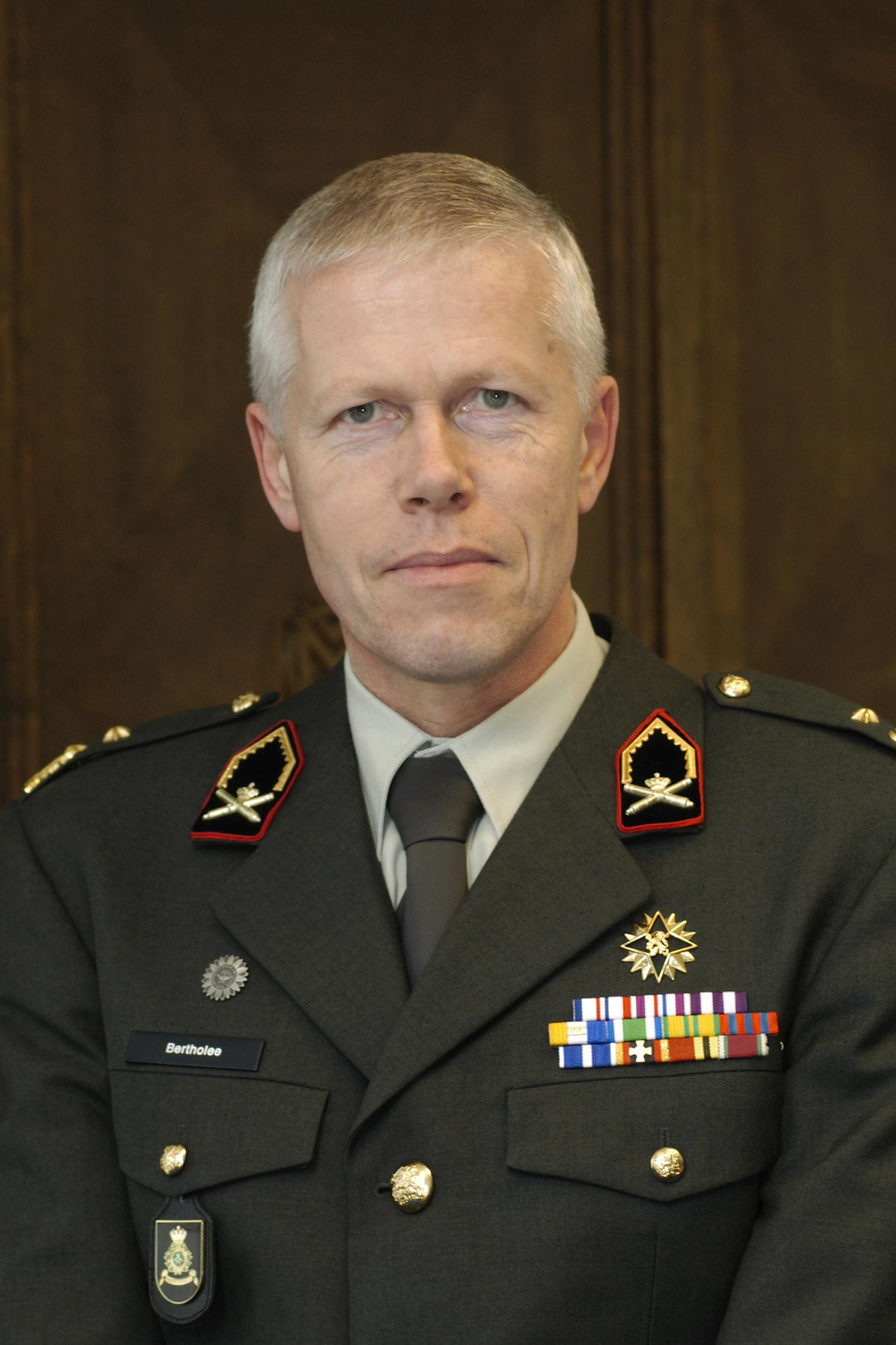
- Rob Bertholee as a major general in 2005

Commander of the Royal Netherlands Army
- In office 13 March 2008 – 25 October 2011
- Preceded by: Lieutenant general Peter van Uhm
- Succeeded by: Lieutenant general Mart de Kruif

Personal details
- Born: 7 August 1955 (age 70) Haarlem, Netherlands
- Awards: Badge of Honour of the Bundeswehr in Gold

Military service
- Allegiance: Netherlands
- Branch/service: Royal Netherlands Army
- Years of service: 1976–2011
- Rank: Lieutenant general
- Commands: Royal Netherlands Army; I. German/Dutch Corps
- Battles/wars: Yugoslav Wars; Kosovo Force (KFOR); War in Afghanistan

Robert Antonius Cornelis "Rob" Bertholee is a retired lieutenant general of the Royal Netherlands Army who served the head of the General Intelligence and Security Service (AIVD) from 2011 to 2018. He previously was Commander of the Royal Netherlands Army from 2008 to 2011. Born in Haarlem, Bertholee is married and has one daughter.

== Military career ==
Bertholee enrolled in the Koninklijke Militaire Academie at Breda in 1975. Completing the training in 1979 he was posted to his first position with the 44th Field Artillery Group as a lieutenant. He subsequently held a number of different commands in The Netherlands and Germany.

Bertholee continued his military education starting in January 1987, enrolling in the Staff Service and Advanced Military Studies courses. Having completed these by December 1988 he was promoted to the rank of major and posted to the Army Staff. He also attended the United States Command and General Staff Officer Course in 1992, attaining a master's degree in Military Art and Science. Returning to the Netherlands, he was posted to the Instituut Defensie Leergangen in Rijswijk as an instructor. He would later be promoted to head of the Strategy Department.

From 1995 to 1997 Bertholee served as commander of the 41st Field Artillery Group in Seedorf. Part of his responsibility was to deal with organisational changes due to the suspending of the Dutch draft and the transformation of his Group into a professional unit. Having been promoted a full colonel in 1997 Bertholee was assigned to the Fire Support Training Center as commanding officer. One year later, in 1998, he was assigned Head of the Personal Office of the Commander of the Royal Netherlands Army.

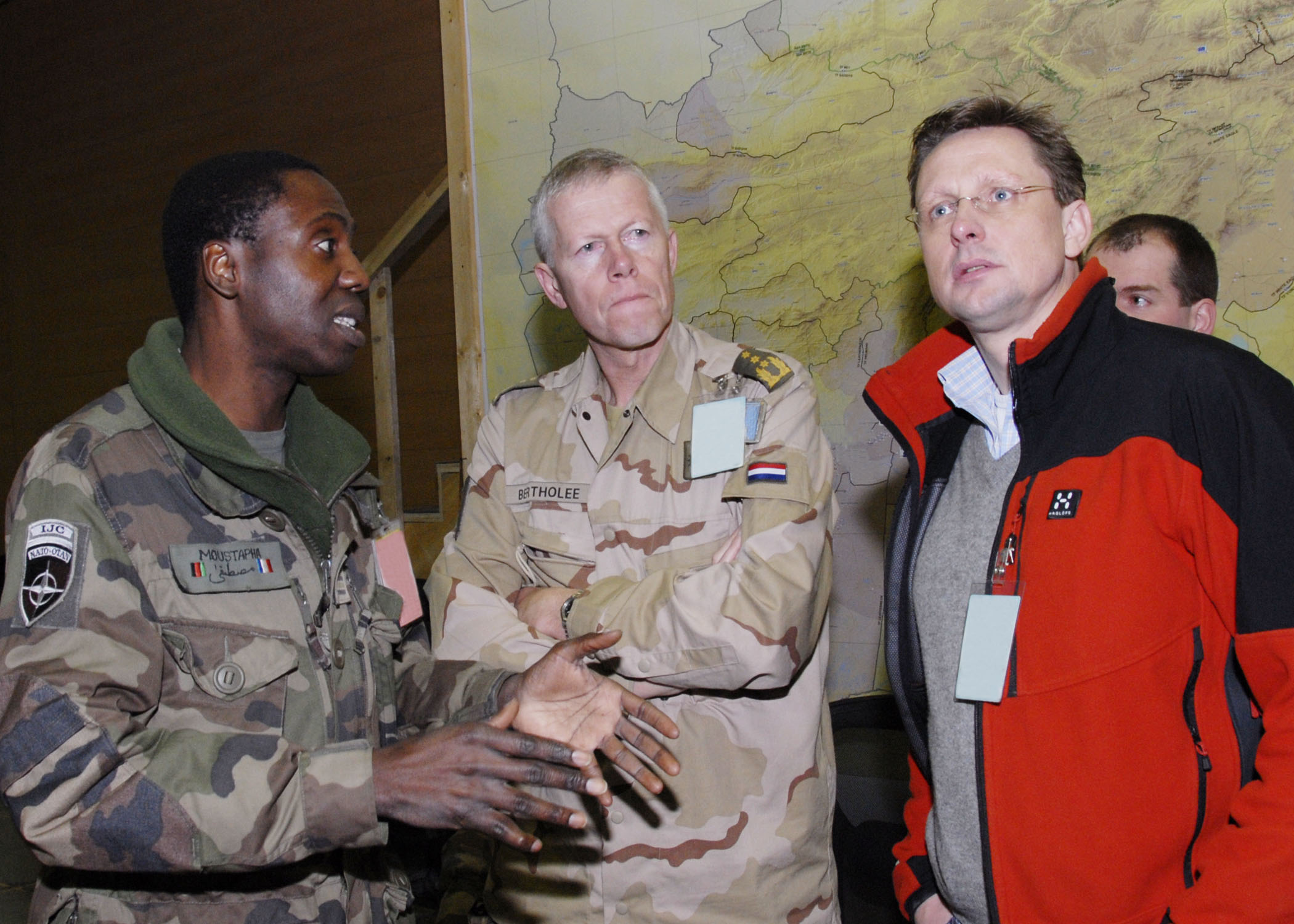
Commander Bertholee (centre) with Representative Han ten Broeke (right) during a visit to Afghanistan, 2010

Bertholee was deployed to Kosovo in 2000 as commander of the Dutch contingent and was responsible for planning and executing their redeployment. After returning to The Netherlands in September he was made head of the International Planning department of the Dutch Defense Staff. He held this position through December 2001, when he was promoted brigadier general and given the Chief of Staff position of the First Combined German-Dutch Army Corps in Münster. As Chief of Staff of this corps he oversaw the transformation of the corps' headquarters to a High Readiness Force (HRF) headquarters. During his tenure as Chief of Staff the First Combined Corps' Headquarters was assigned command of the ISAF mission in Afghanistan, which led to a seven-month tour for Bertholee in Kabul as Deputy Commander and Chief of Staff for ISAF III. He returned to Münster in August 2003 and continued there through 2004, preparing his Corps for NATO certification for the NATO Response Force.

Two weeks after achieving certification Bertholee ceded the First Corps Chief of Staff position to his successor. He was awarded the Gold Cross of Honour of the German Bundeswehr by the German Minister of Defense at that time.

Effective 1 February 2005 Bertholee was promoted major general and assigned Director of the Operational Preparedness Control Board (DOAG). This was followed by promotion on 1 December 2006 to lieutenant general and Deputy Chief of the Netherlands Defence Staff. General Bertholee was promoted Commander of the Royal Netherlands Army on 13 March 2008. In December 2011 he became head of the General Intelligence and Security Service (AIVD).

== Awards and decorations ==
- 2004 – Gold Cross of Honour of the German Bundeswehr
- 2011 – Officer of the Order of Orange-Nassau with Swords

Preceded by Peter van Uhm	Commander of the Royal Netherlands Army; 13 March 2008 – 1 December 2011	Succeeded by Mart de Kruif
