= Edzard Jacob van Holthe =

Dutch military officer (1936–1914)

Vice admiral Edzard Jacob van Holthe
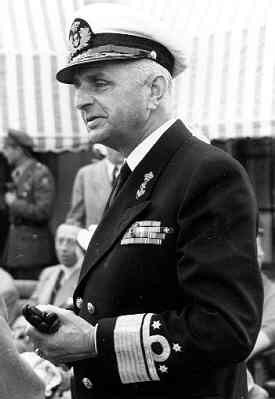

Chairman of the United Defence Staff of the Armed Forces of the Netherlands
- In office 5 January 1951 – 10 January 1953
- Preceded by: General Hendrik Johan Kruls
- Succeeded by: Lieutenant general Fons Aler

Personal details
- Born: 29 January 1896 The Hague, Netherlands
- Died: 17 July 1967 (aged 71) Hilversum, Netherlands

Military service
- Allegiance: Netherlands
- Branch/service: Royal Netherlands Navy
- Years of service: 1913-1953
- Rank: Vice admiral
- Battles/wars: World War II

Vice admiral Edzard Jacob van Holthe (29 January 1896 – 17 July 1967) was a Dutch military officer who served as Chairman of the United Defence Staff of the Armed Forces of the Netherlands between 1951 and 1953.
