= Willem van Rijn =

Dutch military officer (1915–1997)

Lieutenant general Willem van Rijn
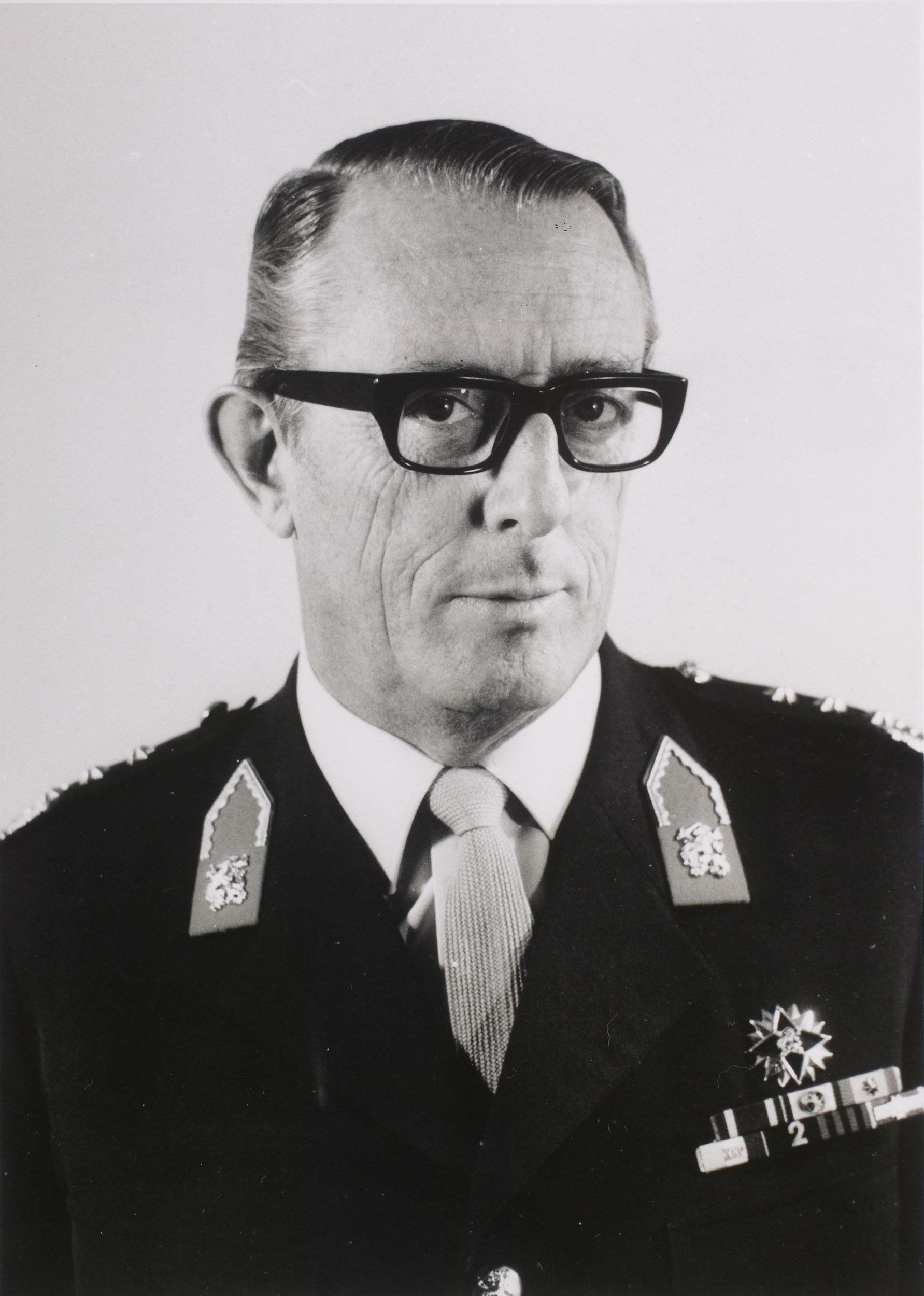

Chairman of the United Defence Staff of the Armed Forces of the Netherlands
- In office 15 January 1972 – 1 November 1973
- Preceded by: Lieutenant admiral Hugo van den Wall Bake
- Succeeded by: General Robbie Wijting

Personal details
- Born: 29 December 1915 Scheveningen, Netherlands
- Died: 20 October 1997 (aged 81) The Hague, Netherlands

Military service
- Allegiance: Netherlands
- Branch/service: Royal Netherlands Army
- Years of service: 1939-1973
- Rank: Lieutenant general
- Battles/wars: World War II

Lieutenant general Willem van Rijn (29 December 1915 – 20 October 1997) was a Dutch military officer who served as Chairman of the United Defence Staff of the Armed Forces of the Netherlands between 1972 and 1973.
