= Ben Hasselman =

Dutch military officer (1898–1984)

General Ben Hasselman
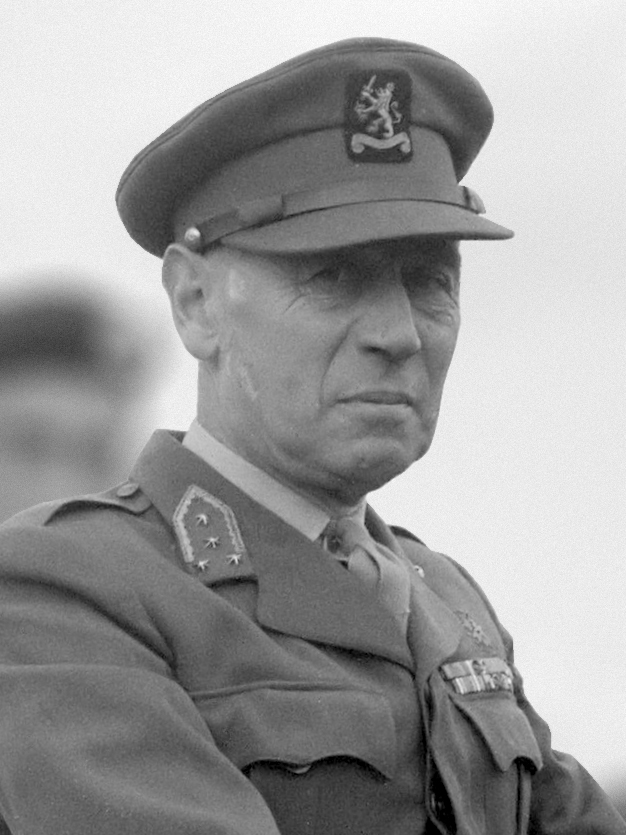
- Hasselman in 1957

Chairman of the United Defence Staff of the Armed Forces of the Netherlands
- In office 1 October 1953 – 1 November 1957
- Preceded by: Lieutenant general Fons Aler
- Succeeded by: Lieutenant general Heije Schaper

Personal details
- Born: Benjamin Richard Pieter Frans Hasselman; March 14, 1898 Rotterdam, Netherlands
- Died: March 2, 1984 (aged 85) The Hague, Netherlands

Military service
- Allegiance: Netherlands
- Branch/service: Royal Netherlands Army
- Rank: General

General Benjamin Richard Pieter Frans Hasselman (14 March 1898 – 2 March 1984) was an officer of the Royal Netherlands Army and chairman of the NATO Military Committee from 1957 to 1958.
