= Hein Zielstra =

Dutch military officer (1908–1985)

General Hein Zielstra
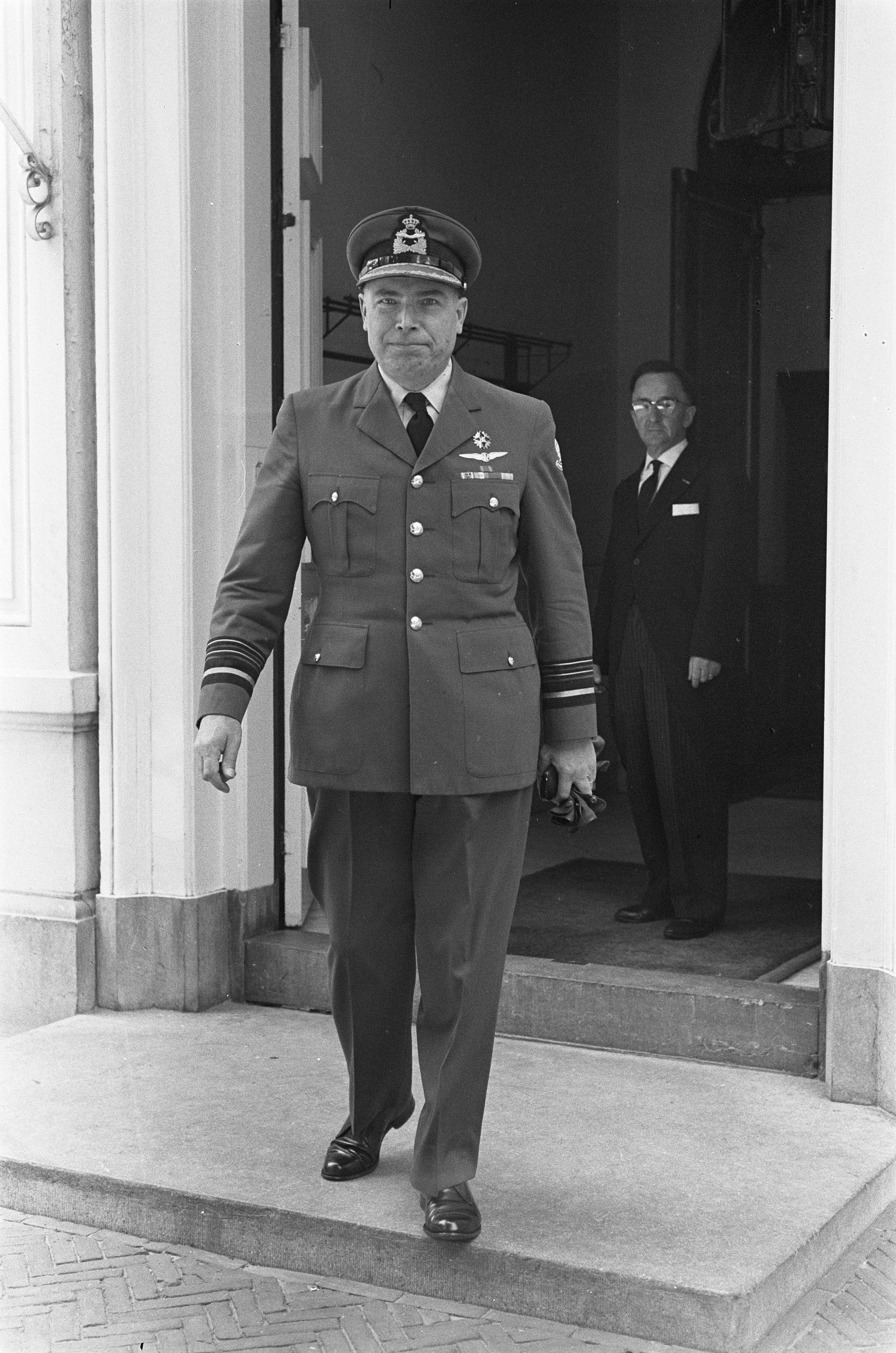

Chairman of the United Defence Staff of the Armed Forces of the Netherlands
- In office 5 May 1965 – 30 December 1968
- Preceded by: General Gillis le Fèvre de Montigny
- Succeeded by: Lieutenant admiral Hugo van den Wall Bake

Personal details
- Born: 8 November 1908 The Hague, Netherlands
- Died: 29 October 1985 (aged 76) The Hague, Netherlands

Military service
- Allegiance: Netherlands
- Branch/service: Royal Netherlands Air and Space Force
- Rank: General

General Hein Zielstra (8 November 1908 – 22 January 1981) was a Dutch military officer who served as Chairman of the United Defence Staff of the Armed Forces of the Netherlands between 1965 and 1968.
