= List of active Royal Netherlands Navy ships =

This is a list of active ships currently in service with the Royal Netherlands Navy.

Naval ensign of Royal Netherlands Navy

== Royal Netherlands Navy ship prefix ==
In Dutch, ships are given the prefix "Zijner Majesteits" ("his majesty's", abbreviated "Zr.Ms.") or "Hare Majesteits" ("her majesty's", abbreviated as "Hr.Ms."). In English, the Dutch prefix is translated as "HNLMS" for "His/Her Netherlands Majesty's Ship". Some authors translate Hr./Zr.Ms. as "HNMS" but that abbreviation is ambiguous: the "N" might stand for "Netherlands" or "Norway". The most common way to avoid this ambiguity is to use "HNLMS" and "HNoMS" respectively.

== Royal Netherlands Navy – active fleet ==
=== Submarine service ===
Class	In service	Origin	Image	Type	Builder	Ship	No.	Comm.	Dsp.	Notes
Attack submarines (3)
Walrus class	3	Netherlands		Attack submarines	RDM	Zeeleeuw	S803	Apr 1990	2,800 tonnes (submerged); 2,450 tonnes (surfaced)	To be replaced by the Orka class
Walrus class	3	Netherlands		Attack submarines	RDM	Dolfijn	S808	Jan 1993	2,800 tonnes (submerged); 2,450 tonnes (surfaced)	To be replaced by the Orka class
Walrus class	3	Netherlands		Attack submarines	RDM	Bruinvis	S810	Jul 1994	2,800 tonnes (submerged); 2,450 tonnes (surfaced)	To be replaced by the Orka class

=== Navy combat fleet ===
Class	In service	Origin	Image	Type	Builder	Ship	No.	Comm.	Dsp.	Notes
Frigates (6)
Karel Doorman class M-class	2	Netherlands		ASW Frigates	Damen Schelde Naval Shipbuilding	Van Amstel	F831	May 1993	3,300 tonnes	Van Speijk inactive due to personnel shortage.
Karel Doorman class M-class	2	Netherlands		ASW Frigates	Damen Schelde Naval Shipbuilding	Van Speijk	F828	Sep 1995	3,300 tonnes	Van Speijk inactive due to personnel shortage.
De Zeven Provinciën class	4	Netherlands		Guided-missiles frigates (air defence & command)	Damen Schelde Naval Shipbuilding	De Zeven Provinciën	F802	Apr 2002	6,050 tonnes	Internationally considered destroyers due to their size, armament, and role.
De Zeven Provinciën class	4	Netherlands		Guided-missiles frigates (air defence & command)	Damen Schelde Naval Shipbuilding	Tromp	F803	Mar 2003	6,050 tonnes	Internationally considered destroyers due to their size, armament, and role.
De Zeven Provinciën class	4	Netherlands		Guided-missiles frigates (air defence & command)	Damen Schelde Naval Shipbuilding	De Ruyter	F804	Apr 2004	6,050 tonnes	Internationally considered destroyers due to their size, armament, and role.
De Zeven Provinciën class	4	Netherlands		Guided-missiles frigates (air defence & command)	Damen Schelde Naval Shipbuilding	Evertsen	F805	Jun 2005	6,050 tonnes	Internationally considered destroyers due to their size, armament, and role.
Offshore patrol vessels (4)
Holland class	4	Netherlands		OPV	Damen Schelde Naval Shipbuilding	Holland	P840	Jul 2012	3,750 tonnes	1 ship of the Holland class is assigned to the Caribbean Coast Guard.
Holland class	4	Netherlands		OPV	Damen Schelde Naval Shipbuilding	Zeeland	P841	Aug 2013	3,750 tonnes	1 ship of the Holland class is assigned to the Caribbean Coast Guard.
Holland class	4	Netherlands		OPV	Damen Schelde Naval Shipbuilding	Friesland	P842	Jan 2013	3,750 tonnes	1 ship of the Holland class is assigned to the Caribbean Coast Guard.
Holland class	4	Netherlands		OPV	Damen Schelde Naval Shipbuilding	Groningen	P843	Nov 2013	3,750 tonnes	1 ship of the Holland class is assigned to the Caribbean Coast Guard.
Combat support ship (1)
Den Helder class	1	Netherlands		Replenishment oiler	Damen Schelde Naval Shipbuilding	Den Helder	A834	2025	22,595 tonnes	
Amphibious warfare (3 ships, 17 landing crafts)
Rotterdam class	2	Netherlands		LPD	Damen Schelde Naval Shipbuilding	Rotterdam	L800	Apr 1998	12,750 tonnes	2 LCU and 3 LCVP carried.
Rotterdam class	2	Netherlands		LPD	Damen Schelde Naval Shipbuilding	Johan de Witt	L801	Nov 2007	15,500 tonnes	2 LCU and 4 LCVP carried.
Karel Doorman class	1	Netherlands		JSS	Damen Shipyards Galați (hull), Damen Schelde Naval Shipbuilding (design / fitting out)	Karel Doorman	A833	Apr 2015	27,800 tonnes	2 LCVP carried.
LCU 3607 class	5	Netherlands		LCU	Visser shipyard Den Helder	–	L9525	2009 – 2011	255 tonnes	Being upgraded to the Mk.III standard.
LCU 3607 class	5	Netherlands		LCU	Visser shipyard Den Helder	–	L9526	2009 – 2011	255 tonnes	Being upgraded to the Mk.III standard.
LCU 3607 class	5	Netherlands		LCU	Visser shipyard Den Helder	–	L9527	2009 – 2011	255 tonnes	Being upgraded to the Mk.III standard.
LCU 3607 class	5	Netherlands		LCU	Visser shipyard Den Helder	–	L9528	2009 – 2011	255 tonnes	Being upgraded to the Mk.III standard.
LCU 3607 class	5	Netherlands		LCU	Visser shipyard Den Helder	–	L9529	2009 – 2011	255 tonnes	Being upgraded to the Mk.III standard.
LCVP Mk.V (NL)	12	Netherlands		LCVP	Van der Giessen-De Noord, Hardinxveld-Giessendam	–	L9565	2009 – 2011	24 tonnes	To be replaced by 12 new LCVP and 8 new LCM from 2025 onwards.
LCVP Mk.V (NL)	12	Netherlands		LCVP	Van der Giessen-De Noord, Hardinxveld-Giessendam	–	L9566	2009 – 2011	24 tonnes	To be replaced by 12 new LCVP and 8 new LCM from 2025 onwards.
LCVP Mk.V (NL)	12	Netherlands		LCVP	Van der Giessen-De Noord, Hardinxveld-Giessendam	–	L9567	2009 – 2011	24 tonnes	To be replaced by 12 new LCVP and 8 new LCM from 2025 onwards.
LCVP Mk.V (NL)	12	Netherlands		LCVP	Van der Giessen-De Noord, Hardinxveld-Giessendam	–	L9568	2009 – 2011	24 tonnes	To be replaced by 12 new LCVP and 8 new LCM from 2025 onwards.
LCVP Mk.V (NL)	12	Netherlands		LCVP	Van der Giessen-De Noord, Hardinxveld-Giessendam	–	L9569	2009 – 2011	24 tonnes	To be replaced by 12 new LCVP and 8 new LCM from 2025 onwards.
LCVP Mk.V (NL)	12	Netherlands		LCVP	Van der Giessen-De Noord, Hardinxveld-Giessendam	–	L9570	2009 – 2011	24 tonnes	To be replaced by 12 new LCVP and 8 new LCM from 2025 onwards.
LCVP Mk.V (NL)	12	Netherlands		LCVP	Van der Giessen-De Noord, Hardinxveld-Giessendam	–	L9571	2009 – 2011	24 tonnes	To be replaced by 12 new LCVP and 8 new LCM from 2025 onwards.
LCVP Mk.V (NL)	12	Netherlands		LCVP	Van der Giessen-De Noord, Hardinxveld-Giessendam	–	L9572	2009 – 2011	24 tonnes	To be replaced by 12 new LCVP and 8 new LCM from 2025 onwards.
LCVP Mk.V (NL)	12	Netherlands		LCVP	Van der Giessen-De Noord, Hardinxveld-Giessendam	–	L9573	2009 – 2011	24 tonnes	To be replaced by 12 new LCVP and 8 new LCM from 2025 onwards.
LCVP Mk.V (NL)	12	Netherlands		LCVP	Van der Giessen-De Noord, Hardinxveld-Giessendam	–	L9574	2009 – 2011	24 tonnes	To be replaced by 12 new LCVP and 8 new LCM from 2025 onwards.
LCVP Mk.V (NL)	12	Netherlands		LCVP	Van der Giessen-De Noord, Hardinxveld-Giessendam	–	L9575	2009 – 2011	24 tonnes	To be replaced by 12 new LCVP and 8 new LCM from 2025 onwards.
LCVP Mk.V (NL)	12	Netherlands		LCVP	Van der Giessen-De Noord, Hardinxveld-Giessendam	–	L9576	2009 – 2011	24 tonnes	To be replaced by 12 new LCVP and 8 new LCM from 2025 onwards.
Mine warfare ships (3)
Alkmaar class Tripartite-class minehunter	3	Netherlands		Minehunter	Van der Giessen de Noord	Schiedam	M860	Jul 1986	510 tonnes	
Alkmaar class Tripartite-class minehunter	3	Netherlands		Minehunter	Van der Giessen de Noord	Zierikzee	M862	May 1987	510 tonnes	
Alkmaar class Tripartite-class minehunter	3	Netherlands		Minehunter	Van der Giessen de Noord	Willemstad	M864	Sep 1989	510 tonnes	
Light boats
FRISC - BC class (fast raiding interception and special forces craft - boarding craft)	19	Netherlands		RHIB - boarding craft	Marine Specialised Technology Ltd.	–	RHIBC 01 – RHIBC 19	2014	8 tonnes	Used by: 8 used on Holland class; 6 used by the Marine Corps (maritime counter-terrorism); 5 used by MARSOF; Craft based on the MST 1000 Enforcer. To be replaced by the FFI.
FRISC - RC class (fast raiding interception and special forces craft - raiding craft)	17	Netherlands		RHIB - raiding craft	Marine Specialised Technology Ltd.	–	RHIBC 01 – RHIBC 17	2014	8 tonnes	Used by the Marine Corps for: amphibious landings; patrols; riverine areas operations.; Craft based on the MST 1000 Enforcer. To be modernised.
FRISC SC class (fast raiding interception and special forces craft - support craft)	12	Netherlands		RHIB - support craft	Marine Specialised Technology Ltd.	–	RHISC 01 – RHISC 12	2014	7 tonnes	Missions the Caribbean for: Support Pelikaan ship; coast guard tasks; patrol; drug control; To be modernised.
RHIB 700	5	–		RHIB	–	WM8-8909	–	1991 – 1995	–	Being phased out.
RHIB 700	5	–		RHIB	–	WM8-9001	–	1991 – 1995	–	Being phased out.
RHIB 700	5	–		RHIB	–	WM8-9102	–	1991 – 1995	–	Being phased out.
RHIB 700	5	–		RHIB	–	WM8-9201	–	1991 – 1995	–	Being phased out.
RHIB 2000	4	–		RHIB	–	WM8-0201	–	2001	–	
RHIB 2000	4	–		RHIB	–	WM8-0202	–	2001	–	
RHIB 2000	4	–		RHIB	–	WM8-0203	–	2001	–	
RHIB 2000	4	–		RHIB	–	WM8-0204	–	2001	–	
RHIB 2000D	4	–	–	RHIB	–	WM8-0602	–	2006	–	2 RHIB 2000D for port protection by Defence Diving Group.
RHIB 2000D	4	–	–	RHIB	–	WM8-0603	–	2006	–	2 RHIB 2000D for port protection by Defence Diving Group.
RHIB 2000D	4	–	–	RHIB	–	WM8-0604	–	2006	–	2 RHIB 2000D for port protection by Defence Diving Group.
RHIB 2000D	4	–	–	RHIB	–	WM8-0605	–	2006	–	2 RHIB 2000D for port protection by Defence Diving Group.
Alunaut A7 FRB	11	Estonia	(Artist impression)	RHIB	Alunaut OÜ	–	–	2022	–	Replacement RHB-700.

=== Auxiliary fleet ===
Class	In service	Origin	Image	Type	Builder	Ship	No.	Comm.	Dsp.	Notes
Logistic support (1)
Pelikaan class	1	Romania (Hull); Netherlands (Fitting out)		Logistic support ship	Damen Shipyards Galați; Damen Schelde,	Pelikaan	A804	Jun 2006	1,150 tonnes	Also used for emergency relief. To be replaced by new naval support vessels.
Submarine support (1)
–	1	Netherlands		Torpedo work ship	Damen Schelde Naval Shipbuilding	Mercuur	A900	Aug 1987	1,400 tonnes	To be replaced by new naval support vessels.
Diving support ships (5)
Soemba class	1	Netherlands		Diving support vessel	Vervaco	Soemba	A850	1989	410 tonnes	To be replaced by new naval support vessels.
Cerberus class	4	Netherlands		Diving support vessel	Scheepswerf Visser	Cerberus	A851	1992	223 tonnes	To be replaced by new naval support vessels.
Cerberus class	4	Netherlands		Diving support vessel	Scheepswerf Visser	Argus	A852	1992	223 tonnes	To be replaced by new naval support vessels.
Cerberus class	4	Netherlands		Diving support vessel	Scheepswerf Visser	Nautilus	A853	1992	340 tonnes	To be replaced by new naval support vessels.
Cerberus class	4	Netherlands		Diving support vessel	Scheepswerf Visser	Hydra	A854	1992	340 tonnes	To be replaced by new naval support vessels.
Research and survey vessels (3)
Snellius class	2	Romania (Hull); Netherlands (Fitting out)		Hydrographic survey vessel	Damen Shipyards Galați; Damen Schelde	Snellius	A802	Feb 2003	1,875 tonnes	To be replaced by new naval support vessels.
Snellius class	2	Romania (Hull); Netherlands (Fitting out)		Hydrographic survey vessel	Damen Shipyards Galați; Damen Schelde	Luymes	A803	Jun 2004	1,875 tonnes	To be replaced by new naval support vessels.
ESB1604	1	Netherlands		Expeditionary survey boat	Damen Group	Hydrograaf	H8021	Feb 2021	22 tonnes	
Harbour patrol vessel (2)
Noorderhaaks class	2	Netherlands		Harbour patrol vessel	Jongert	Noorderhaaks	Y8208	Jun 2015	7.9 tonnes	
Noorderhaaks class	2	Netherlands		Harbour patrol vessel	Jongert	Zuiderhaaks	Y8209	Jun 2015	7.9 tonnes	
Tugboats (9)
Noordzee class "ASD Tug 2810 Hybrid"	3	Netherlands		Coastal tugboat	Damen Schelde Naval Shipbuilding	Noordzee	A871	Jul 2016	604 tones	Replaces 4 tug of the Linge class.
Noordzee class "ASD Tug 2810 Hybrid"	3	Netherlands		Coastal tugboat	Damen Schelde Naval Shipbuilding	Waddenzee	A872	Jul 2016	604 tones	Replaces 4 tug of the Linge class.
Noordzee class "ASD Tug 2810 Hybrid"	3	Netherlands		Coastal tugboat	Damen Schelde Naval Shipbuilding	Zuiderzee	A873	Jul 2016	604 tones	Replaces 4 tug of the Linge class.
Linge class "Delta tug 2750"	1	Netherlands		Tugboat	Shipyard Bijlsma (Hull); Delta Shipyard (Fitting out)	Gouwe	A878	Feb 1997	380 tonnes	
Breezand class	2	Netherlands		Harbour tugboat	Delta Shipyard	Breezand	Y8018	Dec 1989	74.5 tonnes	
Breezand class	2	Netherlands		Harbour tugboat	Delta Shipyard	Balgzand	Y8019	Jan 1990	74.5 tonnes	
Bolder class	3	Netherlands		Harbour electric tugboat	Stormer Marine	Bolder	Y8023	Nov 2023	9.5 tonnes	Replaces 5 tug of the Schelde class.
Bolder class	3	Netherlands		Harbour electric tugboat	Stormer Marine	Beting	Y8024	Jul 2024	9.5 tonnes	Replaces 5 tug of the Schelde class.
Bolder class	3	Netherlands		Harbour electric tugboat	Stormer Marine	Bakspier	Y8025	2024	9.5 tonnes	Replaces 5 tug of the Schelde class.
Training ships (2)
–	1	Netherlands		Training ship	Damen Group	Van Kinsbergen	A902	Nov 1999	630 tonnes	To be replaced by new naval support vessels.
–	1	Netherlands		Training sail boat	De Gier & Bezaan Int.	Urania	Y8050	May 2004	80 tonnes	

=== Leased transport fleet ===
Ship	In service	Origin	Image	Type	Builder	Comm.	Capacity	Notes
Roll-on / roll-off mission support
MV New Amsterdam	1	Netherlands		Conro	Damen Group	2022	300 vehicles and 200 containers (simultaneous)	Ship equipped with a 25-meters crane, and unloading ramp with a capacity of 75 tonnes without quay support.
MV Southern Rock	1	Netherlands		Conro	Hartman Marine BV	May 2024 (made in 2007)	1,606 m^{2} (17,290 ft^{2}), with an open top	4 years lease from Harman Seatrade.
Trica	1	Poland		Conro	Szczecin Shipyard	May 2026 (made in 2007)	300 vehicles, or 694 containers (ora combination)	10 years lease from Spliethoff Shipping Company.
Plyca	1	Poland		Conro	Szczecin Shipyard	Jan 2026 (made in 2007)	300 vehicles, or 694 containers (ora combination)	10 years lease from Spliethoff Shipping Company.
Lift-on / lift-off
A-class	3	China		LoLo cargo ship	Hudong-Zhonghua Shipbuilding	2006 - 2012	500 containers, + space for vehicles / helicopters	Leased from Wagenborg, 3 ships out of a pool of 19 ships (15 A-class and 4 T-class) available within few weeks when needed.
T-class	3	China		LoLo cargo ship	Hudong-Zhonghua Shipbuilding	2012 - 2013	500 containers, + space for vehicles / helicopters	Leased from Wagenborg, 3 ships out of a pool of 19 ships (15 A-class and 4 T-class) available within few weeks when needed.

== Coast Guard – active fleet ==
=== Dutch coast guard fleet ===
The Coast Guard has no vessels of its own, so resources are made available by the cooperating ministries and services.

Class	In service	Origin	Image	Type	Builder	Operator	Ship	No.	Comm.	Dsp.	Notes
Patrol vessels
–	1	Netherlands		Patrol boat	Damen Shipyards Gorinchem	Rijkswaterstaat	Barend Biesheuvel	–	2001	1,150 tonnes	Active in the North Sea. 2 RHIB on board.
Damen Stan Patrol 4207	2	Netherlands		Patrol boat	Damen Shipyards Gorinchem	National Shipping Company	Visarend	–	2001	245 tonnes	1 RHIB on board.
Damen Stan Patrol 4207	2	Netherlands		Patrol boat	Damen Shipyards Gorinchem	National Shipping Company	Zeearend	–	2002	245 tonnes	1 RHIB on board.
Damen Stan Patrol 2706	1	Netherlands		Patrol boat	Damen Shipyards Gorinchem	National Police Corps	P45	–	2002	–	
Damen Stan Patrol 2506	3	Netherlands		Patrol boat	Damen Shipyards Gorinchem	National Police Corps	P41	–	2020	–	
Damen Stan Patrol 2506	3	Netherlands		Patrol boat	Damen Shipyards Gorinchem	National Police Corps	P42	–	2020	–	
Damen Stan Patrol 2506	3	Netherlands		Patrol boat	Damen Shipyards Gorinchem	National Police Corps	P44	–	2020	–	
Buoy vessels
–	3	Netherlands		Buoy tender	Damen Shipyards Gorinchem	Rijkswaterstaat	Rotterdam	–	1987	514 tonnes	laying and maintenance buoys; extinguishing fires; towing of ships; oil spill response; guiding ships in ice
–	3	Netherlands		Buoy tender	Damen Shipyards Gorinchem	Rijkswaterstaat	Terschelling	–	1988	514 tonnes	laying and maintenance buoys; extinguishing fires; towing of ships; oil spill response; guiding ships in ice
–	3	Netherlands		Buoy tender	Damen Shipyards Gorinchem	Rijkswaterstaat	Frans Naerebout	–	1989	514 tonnes	laying and maintenance buoys; extinguishing fires; towing of ships; oil spill response; guiding ships in ice
Pollution control ship
–	1	Netherlands		Oil spill combatment vessel	Damen Shipyards Gorinchem	Rijkswaterstaat	Arca	–	1998	2,388	
Tugboats
–	1	Turkey		ERTV	Selah Shipyard	Multraship Ocean Towage BV since Jan 2016 (Svitzer 2013 - Dec 2015)	Guardian (formerly Ievoli Amaranth)	–	May 2013	820 tonnes	Ship changed name and ownership. Emergency towing assistance on the North Sea on behalf of the Dutch Coastguard.
–	1	Germany		ERTV	Mützelfeldt shipyard (design MAN Ferrostaal / Hitzler shipyard)	Multraship Ocean Towage BV	Multraship Commander (formerly ALP Ace)	–	Jul 2022	530 tonnes	Preventively at sea at the Borssele wind farm to monitor shipping safety. Built in 2006.
–	1	Germany		ERTV	Mützelfeldt shipyard (design MAN Ferrostaal / Hitzler shipyard)	Multraship Ocean Towage BV	Multraship Protector (formerly ALP Ippon)	–	Jul 2022	530 tonnes	Preventively at sea at the Kust wind farm to monitor shipping safety. Built in 2006.

=== Dutch Caribbean Coast Guard ===
Class	In service	Origin	Image	Type	Builder	Ship	No.	Comm.	Dsp. / length	Notes
Offshore patrol vessel (1 borrowed from the Navy)
West Indies Guard Ship (WIGS)	1	Romania (Hull) Netherlands (Fitting out)		OPV	Damen Shipyards Galați, Damen Schelde	Holland class	–	–	3,750 tonnes	Rotation of the Royal Netherlands Navy every 4 to 6 months in support of the Dutch Caribbean Coast Guard. Most often Holland class ship.
Cutters (3)
Stan Patrol 4100 class	3	Netherlands		Cutter	Damen Group	Jaguar	P810	Nov 1998	206 tonnes	Stationed in Aruba, Curaçao, Sint Maarten
Stan Patrol 4100 class	3	Netherlands		Cutter	Damen Group	Panter	P811	Jan 1999	206 tonnes	Stationed in Aruba, Curaçao, Sint Maarten
Stan Patrol 4100 class	3	Netherlands		Cutter	Damen Group	Poema	P812	Mar 1999	206 tonnes	Stationed in Aruba, Curaçao, Sint Maarten
Light patrol boats (17)
38 Defiant	12	United States		High speed patrol boat	Metal Shark	01 - 04	–	May 2018	11.6 m (38 ft)	To patrol waters of Aruba, Bonaire, Curaçao, St. Eustatius, St. Maarten and Saba. Successor of the RHIB.
38 Defiant	12	United States		High speed patrol boat	Metal Shark	05 - 08	–	Jan 2019	11.6 m (38 ft)	To patrol waters of Aruba, Bonaire, Curaçao, St. Eustatius, St. Maarten and Saba. Successor of the RHIB.
38 Defiant	12	United States		High speed patrol boat	Metal Shark	09	A-2539	Feb 2019	11.6 m (38 ft)	To patrol waters of Aruba, Bonaire, Curaçao, St. Eustatius, St. Maarten and Saba. Successor of the RHIB.
38 Defiant	12	United States		High speed patrol boat	Metal Shark	10	A-2540	Feb 2019	11.6 m (38 ft)	To patrol waters of Aruba, Bonaire, Curaçao, St. Eustatius, St. Maarten and Saba. Successor of the RHIB.
38 Defiant	12	United States		High speed patrol boat	Metal Shark	11	A-2541	Feb 2019	11.6 m (38 ft)	To patrol waters of Aruba, Bonaire, Curaçao, St. Eustatius, St. Maarten and Saba. Successor of the RHIB.
38 Defiant	12	United States		High speed patrol boat	Metal Shark	12	A-2542	Feb 2019	11.6 m (38 ft)	To patrol waters of Aruba, Bonaire, Curaçao, St. Eustatius, St. Maarten and Saba. Successor of the RHIB.
Justice 20	5	United States		Patrol boat	Boston Whaler	–	–	2013	6.1 m (20 ft)	

=== KNRM (Royal Netherlands Sea Rescue Institution) ===
Class	In service	Origin	Image	Type	Builder	Ship	Comm.	Dsp.	Notes
Search and rescue vessels
Arie Visser class	10	Netherlands		Lifeboat (rescue)	Habbeké shipyard	Koning Willem I	Jan 1999	28.3 tonnes	Koos van Messel retired in March 2017.
Arie Visser class	10	Netherlands		Lifeboat (rescue)	Aluboot B.V.	Arie Visser	Jan 1999	28.3 tonnes	Koos van Messel retired in March 2017.
Arie Visser class	10	Netherlands		Lifeboat (rescue)	Aluboot B.V.	Zeemanshoop	Oct 2000	28.3 tonnes	Koos van Messel retired in March 2017.
Arie Visser class	10	Netherlands		Lifeboat (rescue)	Aluboot B.V.	Koopmansdank	Jan 2001	28.3 tonnes	Koos van Messel retired in March 2017.
Arie Visser class	10	Netherlands		Lifeboat (rescue)	Aluboot B.V.	Arie Visser	Jan 1999	28.3 tonnes	Koos van Messel retired in March 2017.
Arie Visser class	10	Netherlands		Lifeboat (rescue)	Aluboot B.V.	Anna Margaretha	Jun 2004	28.3 tonnes	Koos van Messel retired in March 2017.
Arie Visser class	10	Netherlands		Lifeboat (rescue)	Aluboot B.V.	Jeanine Parqui	Jan 2006	28.3 tonnes	Koos van Messel retired in March 2017.
Arie Visser class	10	Netherlands		Lifeboat (rescue)	Aluboot B.V.	Joke Dijkstra	Dec 2006	28.3 tonnes	Koos van Messel retired in March 2017.
Arie Visser class	10	Netherlands		Lifeboat (rescue)	Aluboot B.V.	Kitty Roosmale Nepveu	Jan 2007	28.3 tonnes	Koos van Messel retired in March 2017.
Arie Visser class	10	Netherlands		Lifeboat (rescue)	Aluboot B.V.	Antoinette	Nov 2008	28.3 tonnes	Koos van Messel retired in March 2017.
SAR-1500 "Johannes Frederik class"	5	Netherlands		Lifeboat (rescue)	Aluboot B.V.	Jan van Engelenburg	Sep 1990	14.6 tonnes	
SAR-1500 "Johannes Frederik class"	5	Netherlands		Lifeboat (rescue)	Aluboot B.V.	Graaf van Bylandt	Jan 1996	14.6 tonnes	
SAR-1500 "Johannes Frederik class"	5	Netherlands		Lifeboat (rescue)	Aluboot B.V.	Jan en Titia Visser	Nov 1996	14.6 tonnes	
SAR-1500 "Johannes Frederik class"	5	Netherlands		Lifeboat (rescue)	Aluboot B.V.	Kapiteins Hazewinkel	Oct 1997	14.6 tonnes	
SAR-1500 "Johannes Frederik class"	5	Netherlands		Lifeboat (rescue)	Aluboot B.V.	Dorus Rijkers	Jul 1997	14.6 tonnes	
Damen SAR 1906 class	1	Netherlands		Lifeboat (rescue)	Damen Group	NH1816	Nov 2015	–	
Valentijn class	10	Netherlands		Lifeboat (rescue)	Habbeké shipyard	Beursplein 5	1992	10 tonnes	Valentijn boat (first of the class) retired in February 2021.
Valentijn class	10	Netherlands		Lifeboat (rescue)	Habbeké shipyard	Adriaan Hendrik	Oct 1992	10 tonnes	Valentijn boat (first of the class) retired in February 2021.
Valentijn class	10	Netherlands		Lifeboat (rescue)	Habbeké shipyard	Annie Jacoba Visser	Jun 1993	10 tonnes	Valentijn boat (first of the class) retired in February 2021.
Valentijn class	10	Netherlands		Lifeboat (rescue)	Habbeké shipyard	Donateur	1993	10 tonnes	Valentijn boat (first of the class) retired in February 2021.
Valentijn class	10	Netherlands		Lifeboat (rescue)	Habbeké shipyard	Anna Dorothea	Jun 1994	10 tonnes	Valentijn boat (first of the class) retired in February 2021.
Valentijn class	10	Netherlands		Lifeboat (rescue)	Habbeké shipyard	Annie Poulisse	Nov 1994	10 tonnes	Valentijn boat (first of the class) retired in February 2021.
Valentijn class	10	Netherlands		Lifeboat (rescue)	Habbeké shipyard	Alida	Oct 1995	10 tonnes	Valentijn boat (first of the class) retired in February 2021.
Valentijn class	10	Netherlands		Lifeboat (rescue)	Habbeké shipyard	Wiecher en Jap Visser-Politiek	Jun 1996	10 tonnes	Valentijn boat (first of the class) retired in February 2021.
Valentijn class	10	Netherlands		Lifeboat (rescue)	Habbeké shipyard	Koninklijke Nederlands Watersport Verbond (KNWV)	Mar 1997	10 tonnes	Valentijn boat (first of the class) retired in February 2021.
Valentijn class	10	Netherlands		Lifeboat (rescue)	Habbeké shipyard	Frans Verkade	Apr 1997	10 tonnes	Valentijn boat (first of the class) retired in February 2021.
Valentijn-2000 class	7	Netherlands		Lifeboat (rescue)	Habbeké shipyard	Winifred Lucy Verkade-Clark	Jan 2002	10 tonnes	
Valentijn-2000 class	7	Netherlands		Lifeboat (rescue)	Habbeké shipyard	Frans Hogewind	Jan 2002	10 tonnes	
Valentijn-2000 class	7	Netherlands		Lifeboat (rescue)	Habbeké shipyard	Uly	Jan 2003	10 tonnes	
Valentijn-2000 class	7	Netherlands		Lifeboat (rescue)	Habbeké shipyard	George Dijkstra	Sep 2005	10 tonnes	
Valentijn-2000 class	7	Netherlands		Lifeboat (rescue)	Habbeké shipyard	Paul Johannes	Jun 2007	10 tonnes	
Valentijn-2000 class	7	Netherlands		Lifeboat (rescue)	Habbeké shipyard	Edith Grondel	Aug 2016	10 tonnes	
Valentijn-2000 class	7	Netherlands		Lifeboat (rescue)	Habbeké shipyard	De Redder	Jan 2001	10 tonnes	
Van Wijk Class Valentijn-2000 class improvement	1 (+6 on order)	Netherlands		Lifeboat (rescue)	Habbeké shipyard	Van Wijk	Aug 2022	9.5 tonnes	Being acquired.
Van Wijk Class Valentijn-2000 class improvement	1 (+6 on order)	Netherlands		Lifeboat (rescue)	Habbeké shipyard	Pauline	2024	9.5 tonnes	Being acquired.
Van Wijk Class Valentijn-2000 class improvement	1 (+6 on order)	Netherlands		Lifeboat (rescue)	Habbeké shipyard	Irene & Henk	2025	9.5 tonnes	Being acquired.
Van Wijk Class Valentijn-2000 class improvement	1 (+6 on order)	Netherlands		Lifeboat (rescue)	Habbeké shipyard	–	To enter service until 2025	9.5 tonnes	Being acquired.
Van Wijk Class Valentijn-2000 class improvement	1 (+6 on order)	Netherlands		Lifeboat (rescue)	Habbeké shipyard	–	To enter service until 2025	9.5 tonnes	Being acquired.
Van Wijk Class Valentijn-2000 class improvement	1 (+6 on order)	Netherlands		Lifeboat (rescue)	Habbeké shipyard	–	To enter service until 2025	9.5 tonnes	Being acquired.
Van Wijk Class Valentijn-2000 class improvement	1 (+6 on order)	Netherlands		Lifeboat (rescue)	Habbeké shipyard	–	To enter service until 2025	9.5 tonnes	Being acquired.
Harder 2000 class	1	Netherlands		Lifeboat (rescue) RHIB	–	Johanna Margareta	–	3.8 tonnes	
AV 900 type Nikolaas I class	8	Norway		Lifeboat (rescue) RHIB	Mare Safety AS	KBW 1910	Jul 2009	3.4 tonnes	
AV 900 type Nikolaas I class	8	Norway		Lifeboat (rescue) RHIB	Mare Safety AS	Nikolaas Wijsenbeek	Sep 2009	3.4 tonnes	
AV 900 type Nikolaas I class	8	Norway		Lifeboat (rescue) RHIB	Mare Safety AS	Oranje	Apr 2010	3.4 tonnes	
AV 900 type Nikolaas I class	8	Norway		Lifeboat (rescue) RHIB	Mare Safety AS	Evert Floor	Apr 2010	3.4 tonnes	
AV 900 type Nikolaas I class	8	Norway		Lifeboat (rescue) RHIB	Mare Safety AS	Fred	Oct 2011	3.4 tonnes	
AV 900 type Nikolaas I class	8	Norway		Lifeboat (rescue) RHIB	Mare Safety AS	Tjepke Ekkelboom	May 2012	3.4 tonnes	
AV 900 type Nikolaas I class	8	Norway		Lifeboat (rescue) RHIB	Mare Safety AS	Bernardine	Oct 2012	3.4 tonnes	
AV 900 type Nikolaas I class	8	Norway		Lifeboat (rescue) RHIB	Mare Safety AS	't Span	Feb 2013	3.4 tonnes	
AV 900 type Nikolaas II class	9	Norway		Lifeboat (rescue) RHIB	Mare Safety AS	Bert en Anneke Knape	Aug 2013	4.2 tonnes	Reinforced Nikolaas I class
AV 900 type Nikolaas II class	9	Norway		Lifeboat (rescue) RHIB	Mare Safety AS	Cornelis Dito	Sep 2014	4.2 tonnes	Reinforced Nikolaas I class
AV 900 type Nikolaas II class	9	Norway		Lifeboat (rescue) RHIB	Mare Safety AS	Springbok	Nov 2015	4.2 tonnes	Reinforced Nikolaas I class
AV 900 type Nikolaas II class	9	Norway		Lifeboat (rescue) RHIB	Mare Safety AS	Valerie Struis	Sep 2017	4.2 tonnes	Reinforced Nikolaas I class
AV 900 type Nikolaas II class	9	Norway		Lifeboat (rescue) RHIB	Mare Safety AS	Op Dreef	2023	4.2 tonnes	Reinforced Nikolaas I class
AV 900 type Nikolaas II class	9	Norway		Lifeboat (rescue) RHIB	Mare Safety AS	Pieter Houbolt	2023	4.2 tonnes	Reinforced Nikolaas I class
AV 900 type Nikolaas II class	9	Norway		Lifeboat (rescue) RHIB	Mare Safety AS	Royal Flush	Nov 2013	4.2 tonnes	Reinforced Nikolaas I class
AV 900 type Nikolaas II class	9	Norway		Lifeboat (rescue) RHIB	Mare Safety AS	Johanna Maria	2016	4.2 tonnes	Reinforced Nikolaas I class
AV 900 type Nikolaas II class	9	Norway		Training lifeboat	Mare Safety AS	C-Rescue 1	2015	4.2 tonnes	Reinforced Nikolaas I class
Atlantic 75 class	19	United Kingdom		Lifeboat (rescue) RHIB	RNLI "Royal National Lifeboat Institution*	Maria Hofker	Jan 2004	1.6 tonnes	
Atlantic 75 class	19	United Kingdom		Lifeboat (rescue) RHIB	RNLI "Royal National Lifeboat Institution*	Edzard Jacob	Sep 2003	1.6 tonnes	
Atlantic 75 class	19	United Kingdom		Lifeboat (rescue) RHIB	RNLI "Royal National Lifeboat Institution*	Hendrik Jacob	Mar 2004	1.6 tonnes	
Atlantic 75 class	19	United Kingdom		Lifeboat (rescue) RHIB	RNLI "Royal National Lifeboat Institution*	Huibert Dijkstra	Mar 2004	1.6 tonnes	
Atlantic 75 class	19	United Kingdom		Lifeboat (rescue) RHIB	RNLI "Royal National Lifeboat Institution*	Koen Oberman	Jan 2005	1.6 tonnes	
Atlantic 75 class	19	United Kingdom		Lifeboat (rescue) RHIB	RNLI "Royal National Lifeboat Institution*	Francine Kroesen	Sep 2005	1.6 tonnes	
Atlantic 75 class	19	United Kingdom		Lifeboat (rescue) RHIB	RNLI "Royal National Lifeboat Institution*	Griend	May 2006	1.6 tonnes	
Atlantic 75 class	19	United Kingdom		Lifeboat (rescue) RHIB	RNLI "Royal National Lifeboat Institution*	Palace Noordwijk	Oct 2006	1.6 tonnes	
Atlantic 75 class	19	United Kingdom		Lifeboat (rescue) RHIB	RNLI "Royal National Lifeboat Institution*	Maria Paula	Apr 2006	1.6 tonnes	
Atlantic 75 class	19	United Kingdom		Lifeboat (rescue) RHIB	RNLI "Royal National Lifeboat Institution*	Neeltje Struijs	Jun 2007	1.6 tonnes	
Atlantic 75 class	19	United Kingdom		Lifeboat (rescue) RHIB	RNLI "Royal National Lifeboat Institution*	Corrie Dijkstra-van Elk	Jun 2007	1.6 tonnes	
Atlantic 75 class	19	United Kingdom		Lifeboat (rescue) RHIB	RNLI "Royal National Lifeboat Institution*	Baron Van Lynden	Mar 2008	1.6 tonnes	
Atlantic 75 class	19	United Kingdom		Lifeboat (rescue) RHIB	RNLI "Royal National Lifeboat Institution*	Dolfijn	Sep 2008	1.6 tonnes	
Atlantic 75 class	19	United Kingdom		Lifeboat (rescue) RHIB	RNLI "Royal National Lifeboat Institution*	Ineke van Dun - de Meester	2013	1.6 tonnes	
Atlantic 75 class	19	United Kingdom		Lifeboat (rescue) RHIB	RNLI "Royal National Lifeboat Institution*	Chios	Jul 2016	1.6 tonnes	
Atlantic 75 class	19	United Kingdom		Lifeboat (rescue) RHIB	RNLI "Royal National Lifeboat Institution*	Marinus Cornelis	Aug 2016	1.6 tonnes	
Atlantic 75 class	19	United Kingdom		Lifeboat (rescue) RHIB	RNLI "Royal National Lifeboat Institution*	Veronica	Oct 2006	1.6 tonnes	
Atlantic 75 class	19	United Kingdom		Lifeboat (rescue) RHIB	RNLI "Royal National Lifeboat Institution*	Engelina	2007	1.6 tonnes	
Atlantic 75 class	19	United Kingdom		Training lifeboat	RNLI "Royal National Lifeboat Institution*	Margot Krijnen	2015	1.6 tonnes	
Chaterina D class	1 (+11 on order)	Norway		Lifeboat (rescue) RHIB	Stormer Marine	Chaterina D	2023	–	Replacement of Atlantic 75 class
Chaterina D class	1 (+11 on order)	Norway		Lifeboat (rescue) RHIB	Stormer Marine	–	January - February 2025	–	Replacement of Atlantic 75 class
Chaterina D class	1 (+11 on order)	Norway		Lifeboat (rescue) RHIB	Stormer Marine	–	January - February 2025	–	Replacement of Atlantic 75 class
Chaterina D class	1 (+11 on order)	Norway		Lifeboat (rescue) RHIB	Stormer Marine	–	January - February 2025	–	Replacement of Atlantic 75 class
Chaterina D class	1 (+11 on order)	Norway		Lifeboat (rescue) RHIB	Stormer Marine	–	January - February 2025	–	Replacement of Atlantic 75 class
Chaterina D class	1 (+11 on order)	Norway		Lifeboat (rescue) RHIB	Stormer Marine	–	January - February 2025	–	Replacement of Atlantic 75 class
Chaterina D class	1 (+11 on order)	Norway		Lifeboat (rescue) RHIB	Stormer Marine	–	January - February 2025	–	Replacement of Atlantic 75 class
Chaterina D class	1 (+11 on order)	Norway		Lifeboat (rescue) RHIB	Stormer Marine	–	January - February 2025	–	Replacement of Atlantic 75 class
Chaterina D class	1 (+11 on order)	Norway		Lifeboat (rescue) RHIB	Stormer Marine	–	January - February 2025	–	Replacement of Atlantic 75 class
Chaterina D class	1 (+11 on order)	Norway		Lifeboat (rescue) RHIB	Stormer Marine	–	January - February 2025	–	Replacement of Atlantic 75 class
Chaterina D class	1 (+11 on order)	Norway		Lifeboat (rescue) RHIB	Stormer Marine	–	January - February 2025	–	Replacement of Atlantic 75 class
Chaterina D class	1 (+11 on order)	Norway		Lifeboat (rescue) RHIB	Stormer Marine	–	January - February 2025	–	Replacement of Atlantic 75 class
Float 500 class	6	United Kingdom		Lifeboat (rescue) RHIB	–	Fint	1992	0.6 tonne	4 boats of the class retired.
Float 500 class	6	United Kingdom		Lifeboat (rescue) RHIB	–	Tonijn	1991	0.6 tonne	4 boats of the class retired.
Float 500 class	6	United Kingdom		Lifeboat (rescue) RHIB	–	Beluga	1991	0.6 tonne	4 boats of the class retired.
Float 500 class	6	United Kingdom		Lifeboat (rescue) RHIB	–	Zalm	1992	0.6 tonne	4 boats of the class retired.
Float 500 class	6	United Kingdom		Lifeboat (rescue) RHIB	–	Leng	1992	0.6 tonne	4 boats of the class retired.
Float 500 class	6	United Kingdom		Lifeboat (rescue) RHIB	–	Meerval	1995	0.6 tonne	4 boats of the class retired.

Reserve

== Future fleet ==
=== On order ===
==== Royal Netherlands Navy ====
Class	On order	Origin	Image	Type	Builder	Ship	No.	Comm.	Dsp. / length	Notes
Submarines (4)
Orka class	4	France	Artist impression	Attack submarine	Naval Group	Orka	–	2033 – 2037	3,700 tonnes (submerged); 3,300 tonnes (surfaced)	
Orka class	4	France	Artist impression	Attack submarine	Naval Group	Zwaardvis	–	2033 – 2037	3,700 tonnes (submerged); 3,300 tonnes (surfaced)	
Orka class	4	France	Artist impression	Attack submarine	Naval Group	Barracuda	–	2033 – 2037	3,700 tonnes (submerged); 3,300 tonnes (surfaced)	
Orka class	4	France	Artist impression	Attack submarine	Naval Group	Tijgerhaai	–	2033 – 2037	3,700 tonnes (submerged); 3,300 tonnes (surfaced)	
ASW Frigates
ASWF class "Anti-Submarine Warfare Frigate"	2	Netherlands	Artist impression	Anti-submarine frigate	Damen Schelde Naval Shipbuilding	–	–	2029	6,400 tonnes	Succeeding to the Karel Doorman class, final agreement signed in 2023. Additional order for 2 ships planned under DEFENSIENOTA 2024.
ASWF class "Anti-Submarine Warfare Frigate"	2	Netherlands	Artist impression	Anti-submarine frigate	Damen Schelde Naval Shipbuilding	–	–	2031	6,400 tonnes	Succeeding to the Karel Doorman class, final agreement signed in 2023. Additional order for 2 ships planned under DEFENSIENOTA 2024.
Light combat vessels (2)
Multifunctional Support Ship "Modular Integrated Capability for ACDF and North Sea"; Formerly TRIFIC programme (The Rapidly Increased Firepower Capability)	2	Netherlands	Artist impression	Low manned surface vessel (likely COTS offshore supply vessels)	Damen Schelde Naval Shipbuilding	–	–	2026	–	Vessel that would be equipped with a platform for mission containers: SAM; loitering munitions; electronic warfare; anti-ship missiles; strike missiles; sensors
Multifunctional Support Ship "Modular Integrated Capability for ACDF and North Sea"; Formerly TRIFIC programme (The Rapidly Increased Firepower Capability)	2	Netherlands	Artist impression	Low manned surface vessel (likely COTS offshore supply vessels)	Damen Schelde Naval Shipbuilding	–	–	2027	–	Vessel that would be equipped with a platform for mission containers: SAM; loitering munitions; electronic warfare; anti-ship missiles; strike missiles; sensors
Amphibious warfare (landing crafts)
LAC	12	Finland	Artist impression	Unmanned anti-submarine warfare	Marine Alutech Oy	–	–	2026 - 2028	–	Successor of the Landing Craft Vehicle Personnel LCVP Mk.V (NL).
Mine countermeasures vessel
Vlissingen class "City class"	6	France	Artist impression	MCM	Naval Group, ECA Group; Shipyard ATG Giurgiu	Vlissingen	M840	Dec 2025	2,800 tonnes	
Vlissingen class "City class"	6	France	Artist impression	MCM	Naval Group, ECA Group; Shipyard ATG Giurgiu	Scheveningen	M841	Jun 2026	2,800 tonnes	
Vlissingen class "City class"	6	France	Artist impression	MCM	Naval Group, ECA Group; Shipyard ATG Giurgiu	IJmuiden	M842	Jun 2027	2,800 tonnes	
Vlissingen class "City class"	6	France	Artist impression	MCM	Naval Group, ECA Group; Shipyard ATG Giurgiu	Harlingen	M843	Jun 2028	2,800 tonnes	
Vlissingen class "City class"	6	France	Artist impression	MCM	Naval Group, ECA Group; Shipyard ATG Giurgiu	Delfzijl	M844	Jun 2029	2,800 tonnes	
Vlissingen class "City class"	6	France	Artist impression	MCM	Naval Group, ECA Group; Shipyard ATG Giurgiu	Schiedam	M845	Jun 2030	2,800 tonnes	
USV	–	Netherlands	Artist impression	ASW; USV	Dutch Naval Design consortium DEMCON unmanned systems	–	–	From 2028	12 m (39 ft)	USV development initiated in 2024.
Light boats
FFI	13	Netherlands		RHIB boarding craft	De Haas	–	–	–	–	FRISC boarding craft replacement.
Tugboats (3)
Eurotugs 3010	3	Netherlands		Medium tugboat	Neptune Marine	–	–	–	–	

==== Dutch Caribbean Coast Guard ====
Class	On order	Origin	Image	Type	Builder	Ship	No.	Comm.	Dsp. / length	Notes
Cutters (4)
Stan Patrols 5009	4	Netherlands	–	Cutter	Damen Group	–	–	2029	50 metres	Succeeding to the SPa 4100 vessels, Jaguar, Panter and Poema.
Stan Patrols 5009	4	Netherlands	–	Cutter	Damen Group	–	–	2029	50 metres	Succeeding to the SPa 4100 vessels, Jaguar, Panter and Poema.
Stan Patrols 5009	4	Netherlands	–	Cutter	Damen Group	–	–	2029	50 metres	Succeeding to the SPa 4100 vessels, Jaguar, Panter and Poema.
Stan Patrols 5009	4	Netherlands	–	Cutter	Damen Group	–	–	2029	50 metres	Succeeding to the SPa 4100 vessels, Jaguar, Panter and Poema.
Light boats
Interceptor 1102	4	Netherlands		RHIB	Damen Group	–	–	–	–	

=== Planned future fleet ===
==== Royal Netherlands Navy ====
Class	Planned	Origin	Image	Type	Builder	Planned comm.	Dsp. / length	Notes
Frigates (4)
Future Air Defender	4	Netherlands (Potentially other nations)	(Artist impression)	Guided-missiles frigate (air defence)	Damen Schelde Naval Shipbuilding (Potential other nations)	2034 - 41	< 9,000 tonnes	Programme launched in 2024, to become the successor of the De Zeven Provinciën class, first planned to be commissioned in 2034, to enter service in 2036
ASWF class "Anti-Submarine Warfare Frigate"	2	Netherlands	(Artist impression)	Anti-submarine frigate	Damen Schelde Naval Shipbuilding	–	6,400 tonnes	Additional order for 2 ships planned under DEFENSIENOTA 2024.
Light boats
–	–	Netherlands	(Artist impression)	ASW; USV	Dutch Naval Design	–	9.2 tonnes	Equipped with sonar Thales FLASH. Support ASW mission of the ASW frigate.
Multirole combat ships
ATS Programme; Amfibische Transport Schip	6	Netherlands	(Artist impression)	Multirole OPV / LPD	Damen Schelde Naval Shipbuilding	2032	–	To replace: LPD Rotterdam class; OPV Holland class.; Candidate: Damen Enforcer; Potential UK participation with their Multi Role Support Ship-programme.
ATS Programme; Amfibische Transport Schip	6	Netherlands	(Artist impression)	Multirole OPV / LPD	Damen Schelde Naval Shipbuilding	2033	–	To replace: LPD Rotterdam class; OPV Holland class.; Candidate: Damen Enforcer; Potential UK participation with their Multi Role Support Ship-programme.
ATS Programme; Amfibische Transport Schip	6	Netherlands	(Artist impression)	Multirole OPV / LPD	Damen Schelde Naval Shipbuilding	2034	–	To replace: LPD Rotterdam class; OPV Holland class.; Candidate: Damen Enforcer; Potential UK participation with their Multi Role Support Ship-programme.
ATS Programme; Amfibische Transport Schip	6	Netherlands	(Artist impression)	Multirole OPV / LPD	Damen Schelde Naval Shipbuilding	2035	–	To replace: LPD Rotterdam class; OPV Holland class.; Candidate: Damen Enforcer; Potential UK participation with their Multi Role Support Ship-programme.
ATS Programme; Amfibische Transport Schip	6	Netherlands	(Artist impression)	Multirole OPV / LPD	Damen Schelde Naval Shipbuilding	2036	–	To replace: LPD Rotterdam class; OPV Holland class.; Candidate: Damen Enforcer; Potential UK participation with their Multi Role Support Ship-programme.
ATS Programme; Amfibische Transport Schip	6	Netherlands	(Artist impression)	Multirole OPV / LPD	Damen Schelde Naval Shipbuilding	2037	–	To replace: LPD Rotterdam class; OPV Holland class.; Candidate: Damen Enforcer; Potential UK participation with their Multi Role Support Ship-programme.
Amphibious warfare (20 landing crafts)
LCM class	8	Netherlands (Likely with United Kingdom with Multi Role Support Ship)	–	Landing craft	Not selected yet	2028 - 29	–	Succeeding to the LCVP Mk.V (NL), to be selected.
Miscellaneous auxiliary ships
Auxiliary ship replacement programme Offshore	4	Netherlands	(Artist impression)	Training ship, submarine support ship, or hydrographic survey	Damen Group, Royal IHC, or Thecla Bodewes	–	–	Winning shipyard to be announced in 2024. Successor of: Pelikaan (LSS), Mercuur (submarine support), Snellius class ( hydrographic survey), Van Kinsbergen (training ship)
Diving support
Auxiliary ship replacement programme Coastal	4	Netherlands	(Artist impression)	Diving support vessel	Damen Group, Royal IHC, or Thecla Bodewes	–	–	Winning shipyard to be announced in 2024. Successor of: Soemba ship and the Cerberus class diving support vessels

== See also ==
- List of equipment of the Royal Netherlands Army
- List of equipment of the Royal Netherlands Marine Corps
- List of active aircraft of the Royal Netherlands Air Force
- Future of the Royal Netherlands Navy
- Netherlands Marine Corps
- Pantserschip
- List of battleships of the Netherlands
- List of cruisers of the Netherlands
- List of Netherlands sail frigates
- List of minesweepers of the Royal Netherlands Navy
- List of monitors of the Netherlands
- List of submarines of the Netherlands
