= Belgian minehunter Tournai =

Mine countermeasures ship of the Belgian Navy

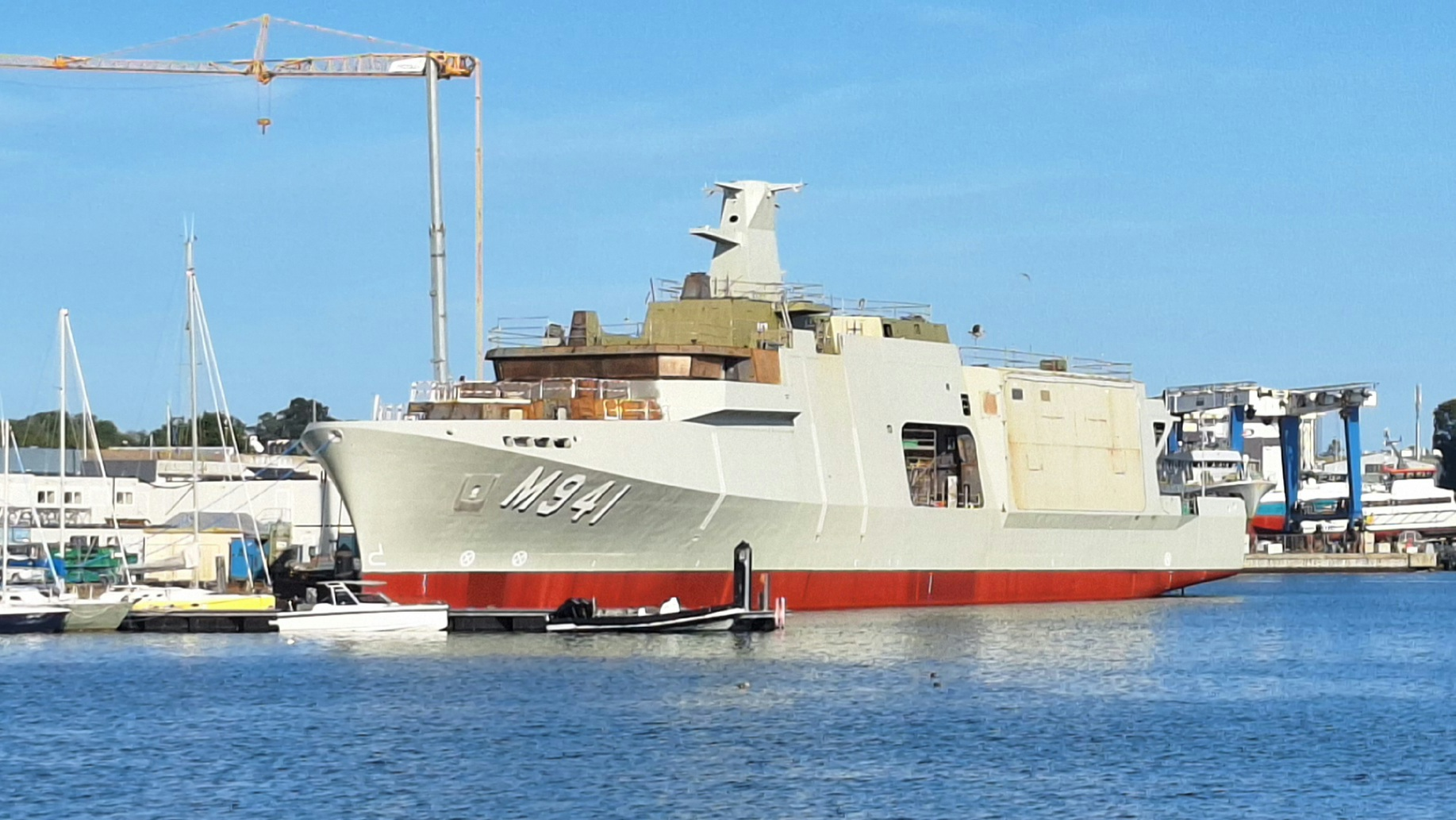
- The ship under construction in Concarneau shipyards.

History

Belgium
- Name: Tournai
- Namesake: City of Tournai
- Builder: Piriou, Concarneau, France
- Laid down: 29 March 2023
- Acquired: 25 September 2026
- Commissioned: 2026 (planned)
- Identification: Pennant number: M941
- Status: Delivered to Belgian Navy

General characteristics
- Class & type: City-class mine countermeasures vessel
- Displacement: 2,900 t (2,900 long tons) full load
- Length: 82.30 m (270 ft 0 in)
- Beam: 17 m (55 ft 9 in)
- Draught: 3.80 m (12 ft 6 in)
- Speed: 15.3 knots (28.3 km/h; 17.6 mph)
- Complement: 29–63
- Armament: 1x Bofors 40 Mk4; 2x 12.7 mm FN Herstal Sea deFNder; 4x 7.62 mm MAG; 2x Water cannon; 2x LRAD

Tournai (M941) is the third ship in the City-class mine countermeasures vessels, and second to be built for the Belgian Navy.

== History ==
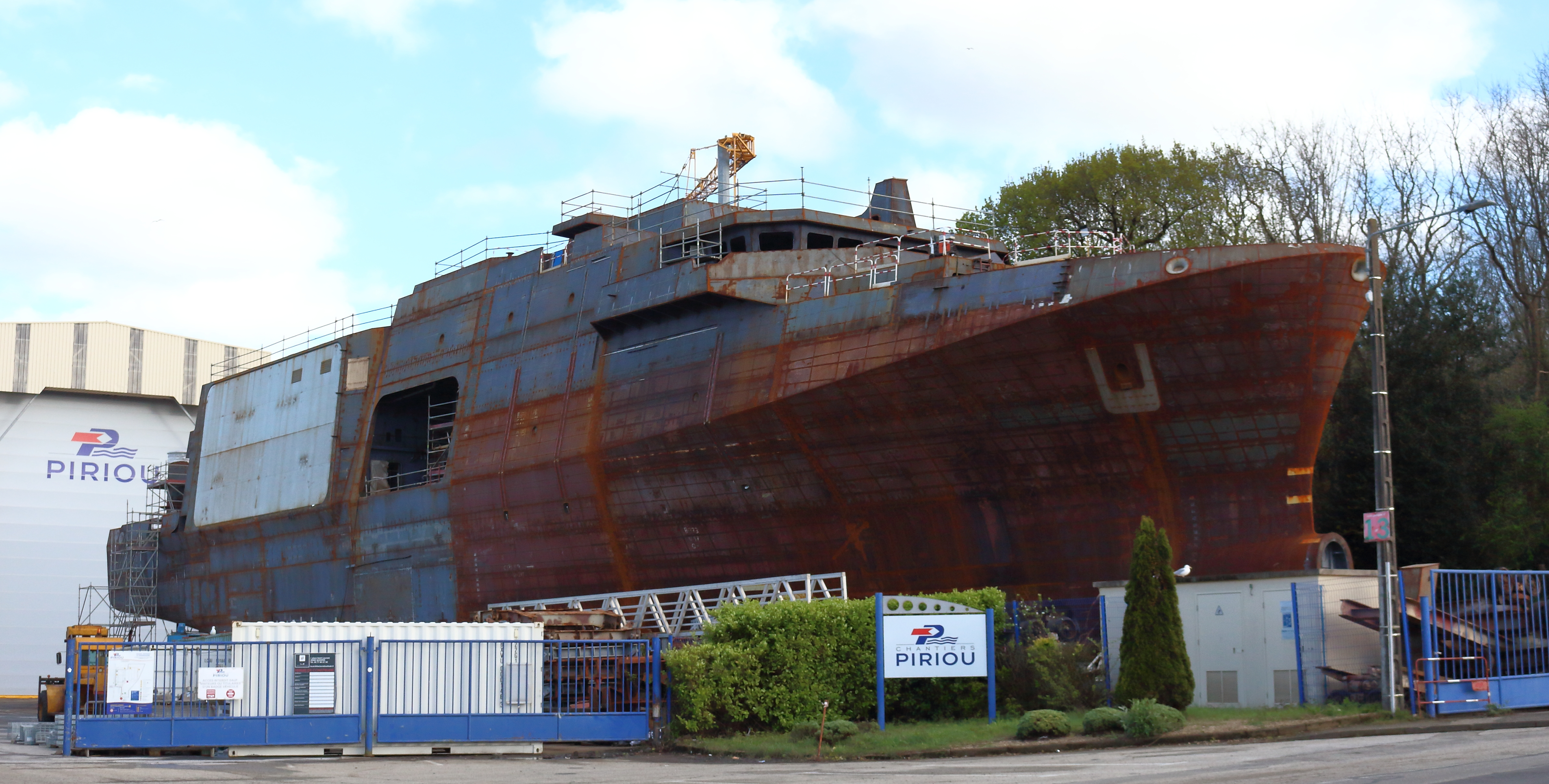

The Tournai officially started construction with her keel being laid at the Giurgiu shipyard during the launch ceremony of her sister ship, the Oostende (M940), on 29 March 2023.

The ship was delivered to Belgian Navy on 25 September 2026.
