= Belgian minehunter Liège =

Mine countermeasures ship of the Belgian Navy

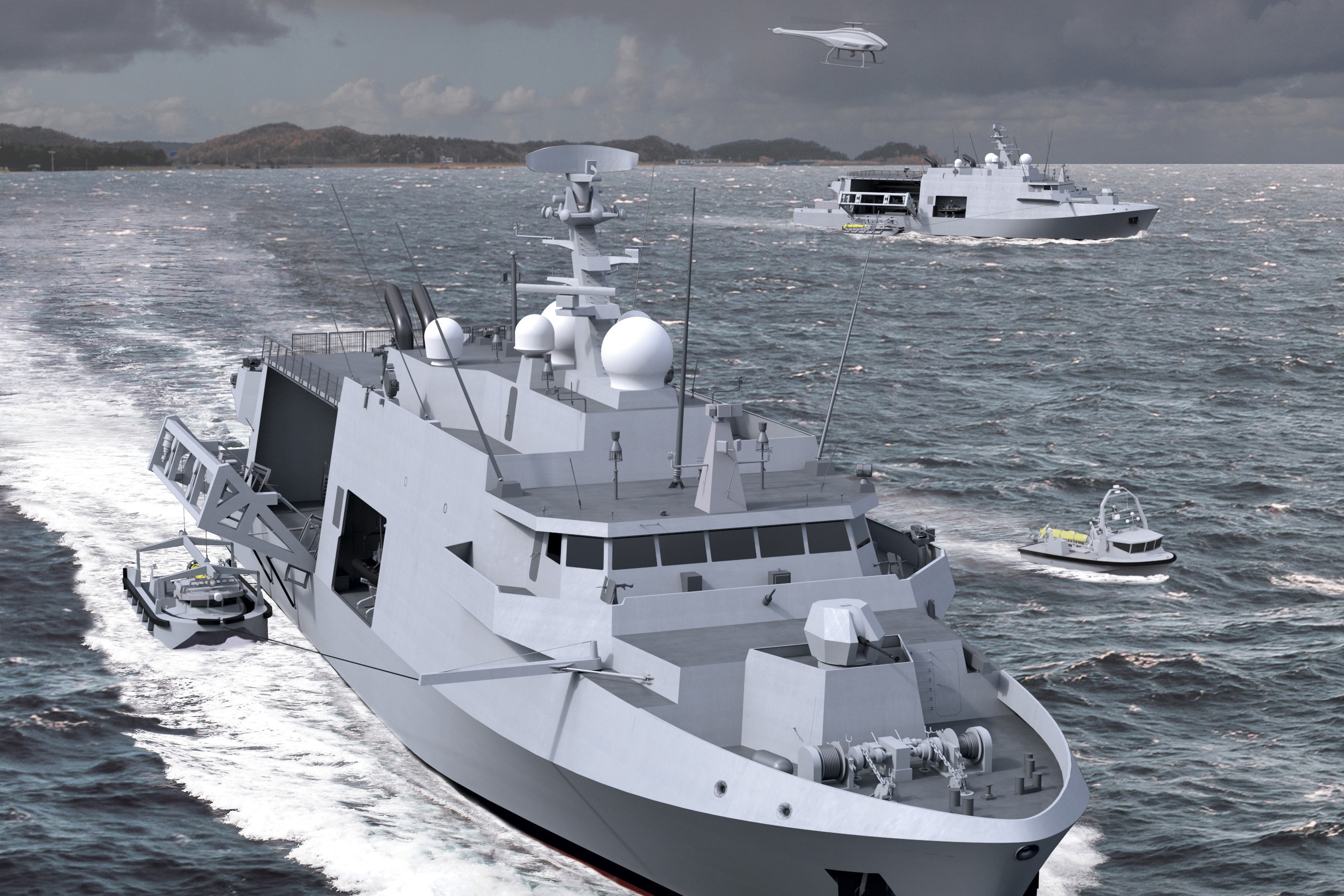
- Artist impression of the City-class MCM

History

Belgium
- Name: Liège
- Namesake: City of Liège
- Builder: Piriou, Concarneau, France
- Commissioned: 2027 (planned)
- Identification: Pennant number: M943
- Status: Under construction

General characteristics
- Class & type: City-class mine countermeasures vessel
- Displacement: 2,900 t (2,900 long tons) full load
- Length: 82.30 m (270 ft 0 in)
- Beam: 17 m (55 ft 9 in)
- Draught: 3.80 m (12 ft 6 in)
- Speed: 15.3 knots (28.3 km/h; 17.6 mph)
- Complement: 29–63
- Armament: 1x Bofors 40 Mk4; 2x 12.7 mm FN Herstal Sea deFNder; 4x 7.62 mm MAG; 2x Water cannon; 2x LRAD

Liège (M943) is the seventh ship in the City-class mine countermeasures vessels, and fourth to be built for the Belgian Navy.
