= HNLMS Delfzijl =

HNLMS Delfzijl (Dutch: Hr.Ms. or Zr.Ms. Delfzijl) may refer to the following ships of the Royal Netherlands Navy that have been named after Delfzijl:

- HNLMS Delfzijl (M851), an Alkmaar-class minehunter
- HNLMS Delfzijl (M844), a Vlissingen-class mine countermeasures vessel
