= HNLMS Schiedam =

HNLMS Schiedam (Dutch: Hr.Ms. or Zr.Ms. Schiedam) may refer to the following ships of the Royal Netherlands Navy that have been named after Schiedam:

- HNLMS Schiedam (M860), an Alkmaar-class minehunter
- HNLMS Schiedam (M845), a Vlissingen-class mine countermeasures vessel
