= Scheveningen (disambiguation) =

Scheveningen is a district of The Hague, Netherlands.

Scheveningen may also refer to:

- HNLMS Scheveningen, several naval vessels
- SVV Scheveningen, a sports club
- Scheveningen system, a method of organizing a chess match between two teams
- Scheveningen variation, a chess opening
