= HNLMS Vlissingen =

2022 Dutch mine countermeasures vessel

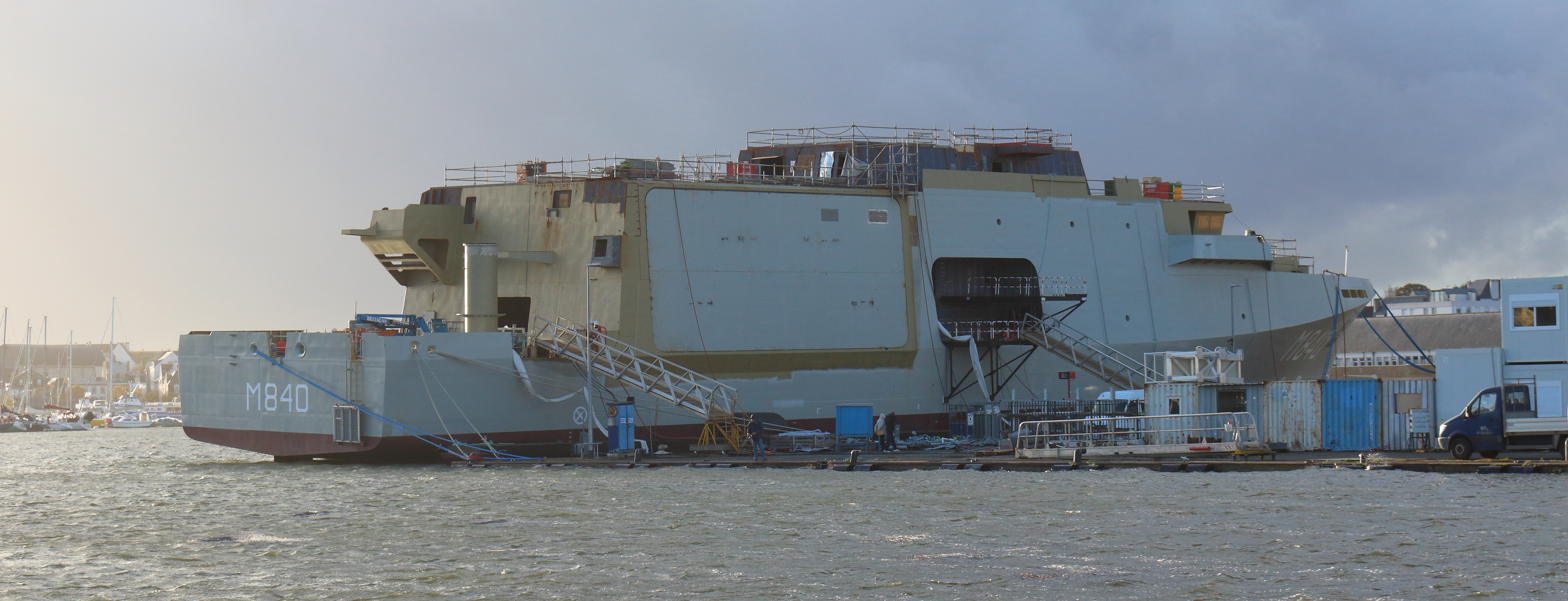
- The ship under construction in Concarneau (France)

History

Netherlands
- Name: HNLMS Vlissingen
- Namesake: City of Vlissingen
- Builder: Kership, Lorient, France
- Laid down: 14 June 2022
- Acquired: 27 February 2026
- Identification: Pennant number: M840
- Status: Delivered

General characteristics
- Class & type: Vlissingen-class mine countermeasures vessel
- Displacement: 2,800 t (2,800 long tons) full load
- Length: 82.6 m (271 ft 0 in)
- Beam: 17 m (55 ft 9 in)
- Draught: 3.80 m (12 ft 6 in)
- Speed: 15.3 knots (28.3 km/h; 17.6 mph)
- Complement: 33–63
- Armament: 1x Bofors 40 Mk4; 2x 12.7 mm FN Herstal Sea deFNder; 4x 7.62 mm MAG; 2x Water cannon; 2x LRAD

HNLMS Vlissingen (M840) is the second ship in the City / Vlissingen-class of mine countermeasures vessels, and first to be built for the Royal Netherlands Navy.

== History ==
Vlissingen is the result of a joint procurement programme for the replacements of the Tripartite- / Alkmaar-class minehunters for the Belgian- and Dutch navies.

She was the second ship in the class behind Oostende (M940) and the first for the Royal Netherlands Navy. She was laid down at Kership, Lorient, France on 14 June 2022, and was planned to be commissioned in 2025.

Sea trials began on March 31 2025. During this trial the ships performance was tested with an emphasis on its propulsion system and maneuverability.

On 27 February 2026 Vlissingen arrived at the Nieuwe Haven Naval Base in Den Helder. However, shortly before berthing smoke developed in an electrical cabinet of the ship, which was quickly put under control by the naval fire brigade. However, in April Vlissingen was still moored at Nieuwe Haven as a result of the fire.

== See also ==
- Future of the Royal Netherlands Navy
