= HNLMS Scheveningen =

HNLMS Scheveningen (Dutch: Hr.Ms. or Zr.Ms. Scheveningen) may refer to the following ships of the Royal Netherlands Navy that have been named after Scheveningen:

- HNLMS Scheveningen (M855), an Alkmaar-class minehunter
- HNLMS Scheveningen (M841), a Vlissingen-class mine countermeasures vessel
