= HNLMS IJmuiden =

Mine countermeasures ship of the Royal Netherlands Navy

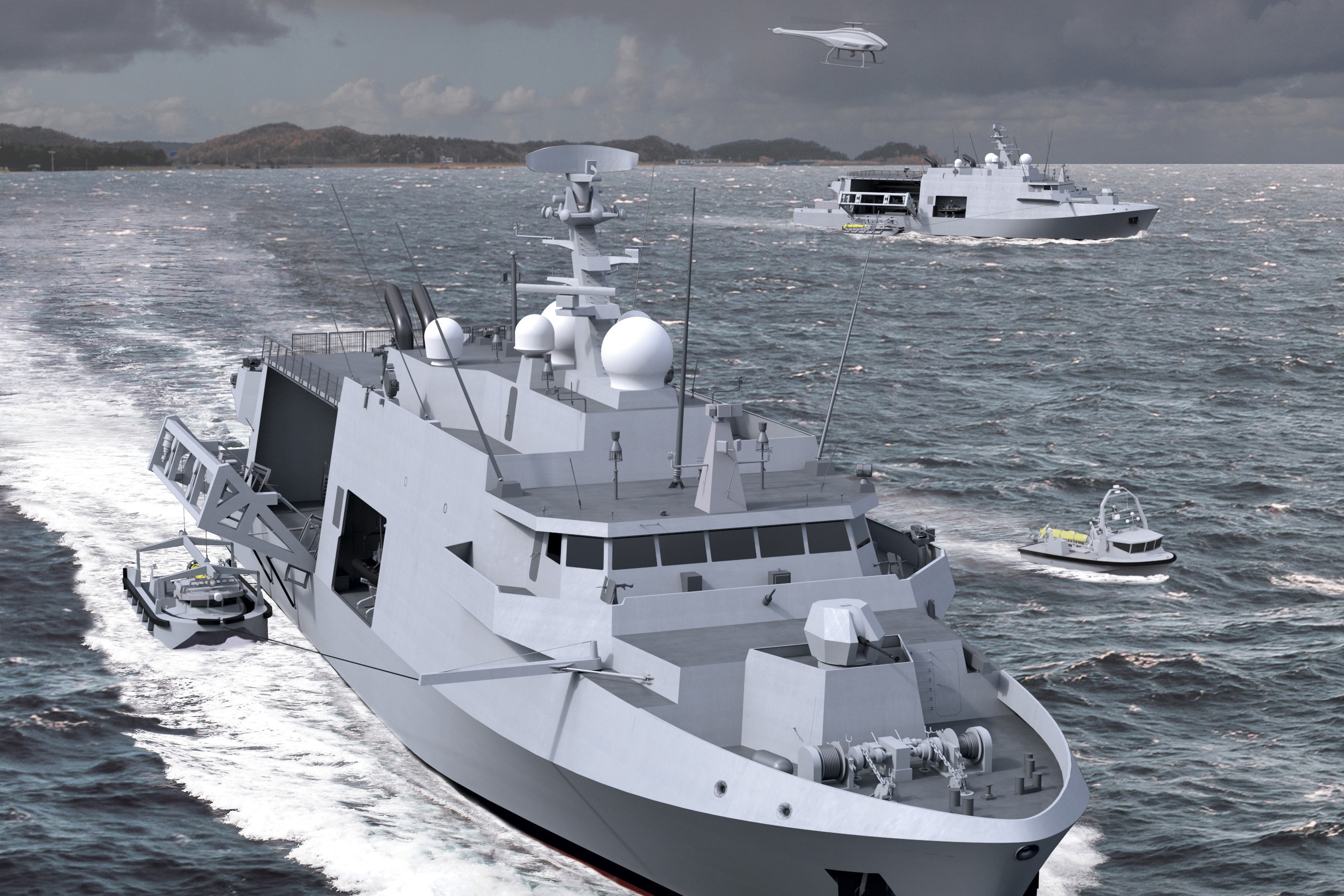
- Artist impression of the Vlissingen-class MCM

History

Netherlands
- Name: HNLMS IJmuiden
- Namesake: City of IJmuiden
- Builder: Kership, Lorient, France
- Commissioned: 2027 (planned)
- Identification: Pennant number: M842
- Status: Planned

General characteristics
- Class & type: Vlissingen-class mine countermeasures vessel
- Displacement: 2,900 t (2,900 long tons) full load
- Length: 82.30 m (270 ft 0 in)
- Beam: 17 m (55 ft 9 in)
- Draught: 3.80 m (12 ft 6 in)
- Speed: 15.3 knots (28.3 km/h; 17.6 mph)
- Complement: 29–63
- Armament: 1x Bofors 40 Mk4; 2x 12.7 mm FN Herstal Sea deFNder; 4x 7.62 mm MAG; 2x Water cannon; 2x LRAD

HNLMS IJmuiden (M842) is the sixth ship in the City / Vlissingen-class mine countermeasures vessels, and third to be built for the Royal Netherlands Navy.

== See also ==
- Future of the Royal Netherlands Navy
