= HNLMS Scheveningen (M841) =

Mine countermeasures ship of the Royal Netherlands Navy

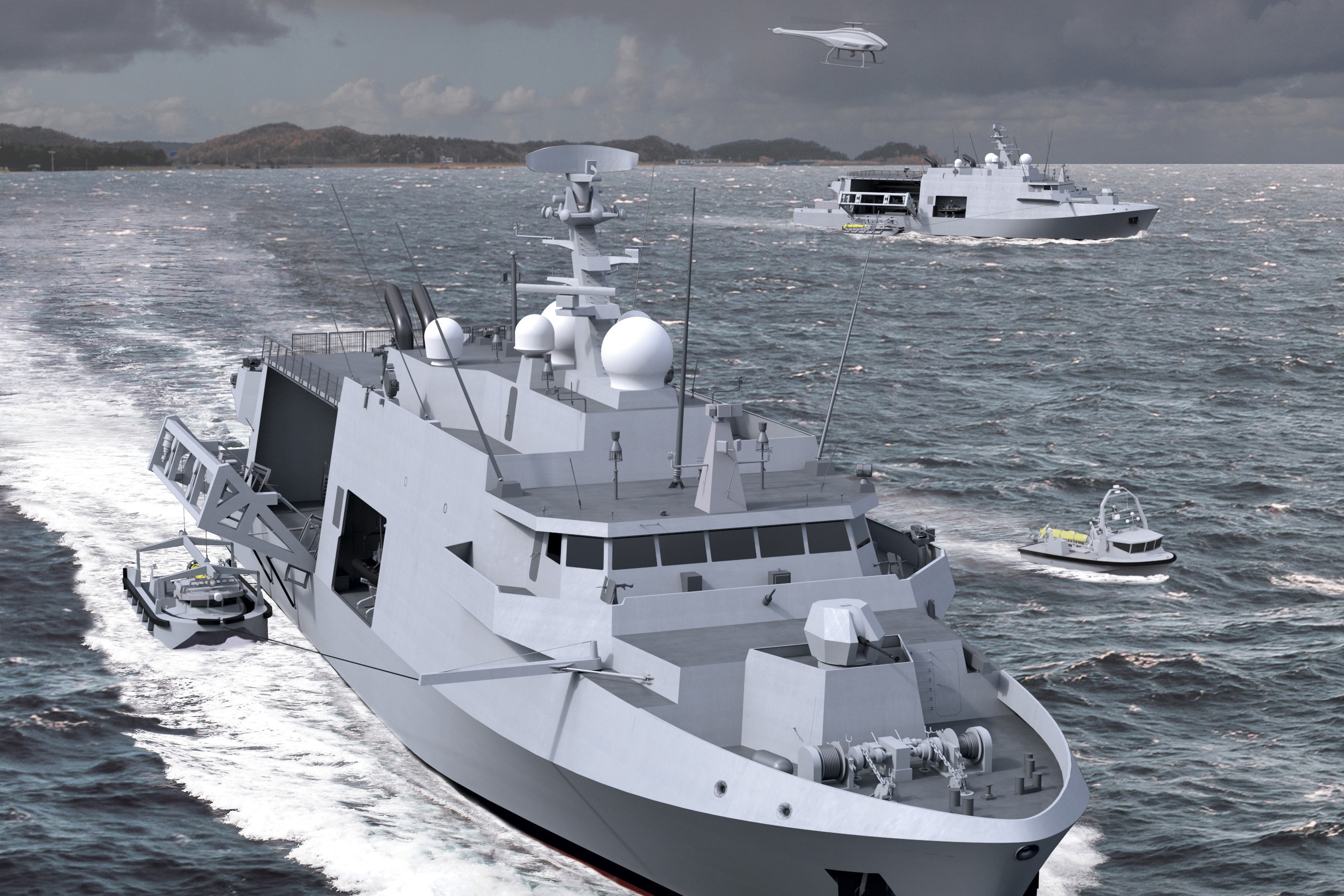
- Artist impression of the Vlissingen-class MCM

History

Netherlands
- Name: HNLMS Scheveningen
- Namesake: City of Scheveningen
- Builder: Kership, Lorient, France
- Laid down: 19 July 2023
- Commissioned: 2026 (planned)
- Identification: Pennant number: M841
- Status: Sea trials

General characteristics
- Class & type: Vlissingen-class mine countermeasures vessel
- Displacement: 2,900 t (2,900 long tons) full load
- Length: 82.30 m (270 ft 0 in)
- Beam: 17 m (55 ft 9 in)
- Draught: 3.80 m (12 ft 6 in)
- Speed: 15.3 knots (28.3 km/h; 17.6 mph)
- Complement: 29–63
- Armament: 1x Bofors 40 Mk4; 2x 12.7 mm FN Herstal Sea deFNder; 4x 7.62 mm MAG; 2x Water cannon; 2x LRAD

HNLMS Scheveningen (M841) is the fourth ship in the City / Vlissingen-class mine countermeasures vessels, and second to be built for the Royal Netherlands Navy.

== History ==
Scheveningen is the result of a joint procurement programme for the replacements of the Tripartite- / Alkmaar-class minehunters for the Belgian- and Dutch navies.

She will be the second ship in the class and the second for the Royal Netherlands Navy. Her keel was laid down at Giurgiu shipyard, Giurgiu, Romania on 19 July 2023, and is planned to be commissioned in 2026.

On 4 June 2026 Scheveningen began her sea trials.

== See also ==
- Future of the Royal Netherlands Navy
