= Belgian minehunter Oostende =

Mine countermeasures ship of the Belgian Navy

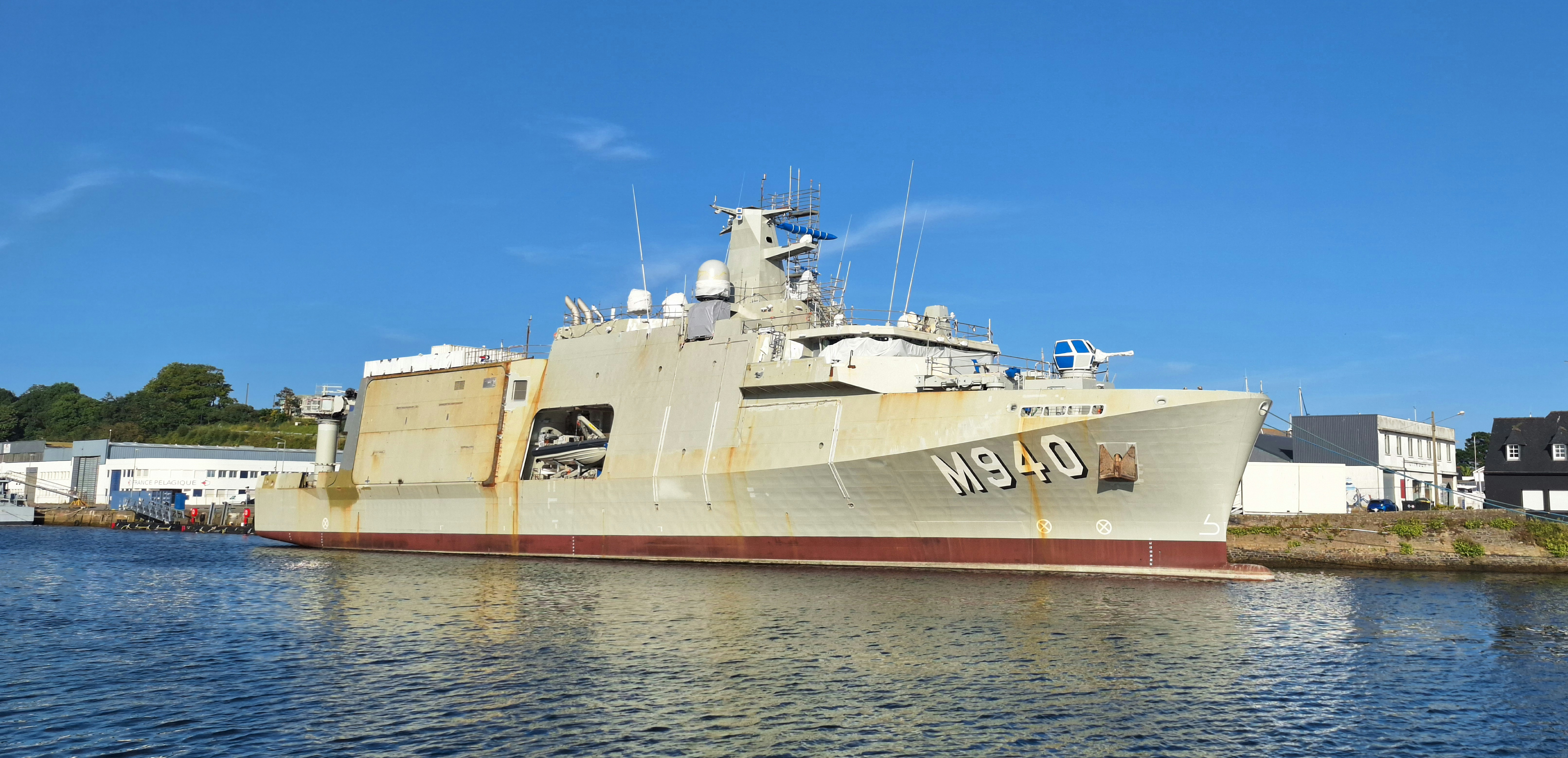
- Oostende a few days after the beginning of her sea trials

History

Belgium
- Name: Oostende
- Namesake: City of Oostende
- Builder: Piriou, Concarneau, France
- Laid down: 30 November 2021
- Launched: 29 March 2023
- Commissioned: 6 November 2025
- Identification: Pennant number: M940
- Status: In service

General characteristics
- Class & type: City-class mine countermeasures vessel
- Displacement: 2,800 t (2,800 long tons) full load
- Length: 82.30 m (270 ft 0 in)
- Beam: 17 m (55 ft 9 in)
- Draught: 3.80 m (12 ft 6 in)
- Speed: 15.3 knots (28.3 km/h; 17.6 mph)
- Complement: 33–63
- Armament: Bofors 40 Mk4; 2 × 12.7 mm FN Herstal Sea deFNder; 7.62 mm MAG; Water cannon; LRAD

Oostende (M940) is the first ship in the City-class mine countermeasures vessels. She was constructed in France for the Belgian Navy.

== History ==
Oostende (Ostend) is the result of a joint procurement programme for the replacements of the Tripartite- / Alkmaar-class minehunters for the Belgian- and Dutch navies.

She was the first in class followed by HNLMS Vlissingen which was the first for the Royal Netherlands Navy. She was laid down at Piriou, Concarneau, France on 30 November 2021. On 19 December 2022, she got out of the construction hangar and work on masts, paintings and furniture began. She was planned to be commissioned in December 2024.

The technical launch took place in late February 2023, with the official launch a month later on 29 March. Sea trials started on 17 July 2024 in Concarneau. She was commissioned on 6 November 2025.
