= USS Bullfinch (AM-66) =

Minesweeper of the United States Navy

History

United States
- Name: USS Bullfinch
- Builder: Bath Iron Works, Bath, Maine
- Laid down: 22 May 1937, as MV Villanova
- Launched: 21 October 1937
- Acquired: by purchase, 6 August 1940
- Commissioned: 22 October 1940
- Decommissioned: 15 September 1944
- Stricken: 23 September 1944
- Fate: Transferred to War Shipping Administration for disposal, 28 August 1945

General characteristics
- Class & type: Bullfinch-class minesweeper
- Displacement: 425 long tons (432 t)
- Length: 136 ft 4 in (41.55 m)
- Beam: 24 ft (7.3 m)
- Draft: 11 ft (3.4 m) full
- Propulsion: 1 × 700 hp (522 kW) Fairbanks-Morse diesel engine, 1 shaft
- Speed: 10 knots (19 km/h; 12 mph)
- Complement: Unknown
- Armament: 1 × 3"/50 caliber gun; 2 × .50 cal (12.7 mm) machine guns

USS Bullfinch (AM-66) was a Bullfinch-class minesweeper of the United States Navy during World War II.

She was laid down as the MV Villanova on 22 May 1937 by Bath Iron Works, Bath, Maine, for F. J. O'Hara and Sons, Inc., Boston, Massachusetts. She was the last trawler built at Bath Iron Works for a United States owner). Launched on 21 October 1937, and delivered on 1 November 1937, she was acquired by the U.S. Navy on 6 August 1940. Villanova was renamed Bullfinch on 14 August 1940, and commissioned in ordinary, on 16 August 1940. She then commenced conversion to a minesweeper at the Norfolk Navy Yard, Portsmouth, Virginia. She was placed in full commission as USS Bullfinch (AM-66), on 22 October 1940. Her conversion was completed on 22 April 1941.

== Service history ==
=== World War II, 1941–1944 ===
Bullfinch was assigned to special duty with the Mine Warfare School at Yorktown, Virginia. She spent her entire career operating under the auspices of the Commandant, 5th Naval District. Except for one cruise up Chesapeake Bay to visit Baltimore, Maryland, the minesweeper restricted her operations to the waters around Norfolk and Yorktown. She continued minesweeping and mine warfare training duties until decommissioned at Yorktown on 15 September 1944.

=== Decommissioning ===
Bullfinch's name was struck from the Navy List on 23 September 1944. Apparently, the former minesweeper was berthed somewhere in the Norfolk-Yorktown area for about 11 months. On 28 August 1945, she was transferred to the Maritime Commission's War Shipping Administration at Little Creek, Virginia, for disposal.

== See also ==
- Bullfinch class destroyer
