= List of Netherlands sail frigates =

This is a list of Dutch sail frigates of the period 1640 to 1860: Year is building year, not necessarily launching year. The number refers to the number of cannon.

- Alliantie 36-gun (1788)
- Amalia 58-gun
- Amazone 36-gun
- Ambuscade 32-gun
- Amphitrite 44-gun
- Argo 36-gun (1772)
- Beken Vliet (Beekvliet) 44-gun (1726)
- Beschermer 44-gun (1735)
- Burgvlied 44-gun (1722)
- Edam 44-gun (1711)
- Furie 36-gun
- Gelderland 36-gun
- Gorinchem 46-gun (1727)
- Gouderak 44-gun (1733)
- Hilverbeek 44-gun (1729)
- Hof St Jans Kerke 36-gun(1733)
- Langeveld 38-gun (1720)
- Leyderdorp 44-gun (1730)
- Maarsen 38-gun (1718)
- Meervlied 44-gun (1724)
- Middelburg 44-gun (1734)
- Noordwijk op Zee 44-gun (1726)
- Oud Teilingen 46-gun (1726)
- Pallas 44-gun (1724)
- Prinses Frederika Louise Wilhelmina 36-gun (1790)
- Prins Friso 58-gun
- Rossum 44-gun (1712)
- Sea-horse 50-gun
- Statenland 50-gun
- Teilingen 44-gun (1735)
- Thulen or Tholen 40-gun
- Wageningen 36-gun (1723)
- Westerdijkshorn 44-gun (1728)
- Vredenhof 44-gun (1724)
- Zeerijp 34-gun
