= City-class mine countermeasures vessel =

Class of mine countermeasures vessels of the Royal Netherlands Navy and Belgian Navy

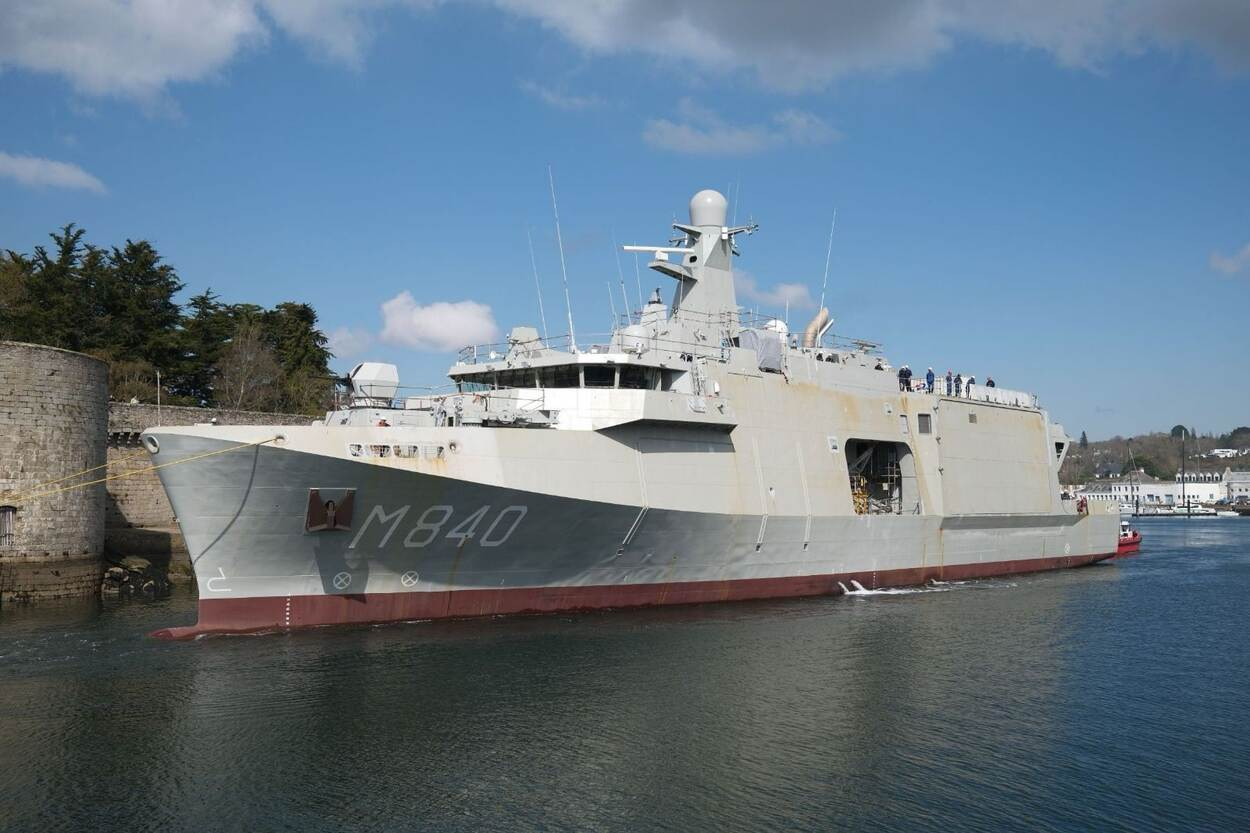
- HNLMS Vlissingen under construction in 2025.

Class overview
- Name: City class (Belgium); Vlissingen class (Netherlands)
- Builders: Designer: Naval Group; Builders: Piriou Concarneau (France); Kership Lorient (France); Shipyard ATG Giurgiu (Romania)
- Operators: Belgian Navy; Royal Netherlands Navy
- Preceded by: Tripartite class; Alkmaar class
- Cost: €166.67 million per unit (Note: Unit cost is based on the May 2019 €2 billion contract for 12 systems for the Belgian Navy and the Royal Netherlands Navy.)
- Built: Since November 2021
- In commission: Since November 2025
- Planned: 12
- Completed: 3
- Active: 1

General characteristics
- Type: Mine countermeasures vessel
- Displacement: 2,800 t (2,800 long tons) full load
- Length: 82.6 m (271 ft 0 in)
- Beam: 17 m (55 ft 9 in)
- Draught: 3.80 m (12 ft 6 in)
- Installed power: 32 MW (43,000 hp)
- Propulsion: CODLAD: 1 × ABC 12VDZC diesel generator; 2 × ABC 6DZC diesel generators; 2 × MEP electric motors (1,800 kW each); Propellers: 2 × Wärtsila axles with fixed pitch screws; 2 × Wärtsila transverse bow thrusters; 1 × Wärtsila transverse stern thruster
- Speed: 15.3 knots (28.3 km/h; 17.6 mph)
- Complement: 33 to 63
- Sensors & processing systems: Systems; Combat system: Naval Group Polaris system; Drone management system and data analysis: UMISOFT suite; Naval Group Multi-Drone Mission System (MDMS); Containerized Command and Control Centre with the Mine Warfare System (MWS); Sonars: Bow sonar: iXblue FLS 60; Towed sonar:ECA T18-M; Autonomous drone with sonar for mine detection: ECA A18-M AUV (equipped with Exail UMISAS 120 sonar); Radars: Naval surveillance radar: Terma Scanter 6000; Target tracking radar: Thales NS50 AESA; Electro-optical sensors: 2 × Sea Eagle FCEO stabilised cameras (HD and infrared) with laser rangefinder, (by Chess Dynamics); Communications: Saab TactiCall ICS communication suite; Navigation: iXblue inertial navigation system; Underwater drones: ECA Seascan MK2 (identifying mine); ECA K-STER C (disabling mines)'; Patria Sonac ACS - Acoustic Minesweeping Systems drone; Electronics for the drones by ST Engineering iDirect Belgium, a subcontractor of Exail
- Armament: Guns: 1 × BAE Bofors 40 Mk4; 2 × FN Herstal Sea deFNder (with FN M3R machine guns); 4 × FN MAG (general-purpose machine guns on board); Non-lethal weapons: 2 × water cannon; 2 × Long-range acoustic device (LRAD)
- Aircraft carried: 2 × UMS Skeldar V-200 unmanned aerial vehicles
- Notes: Surface boats: 2 × 7 m SOLAS Viking RHIB; 1 × ECA Inspector 125 unmanned vessel which deploys the drones equipped with an Exail FLS-5 sonar); Others: Exail influence dragger with five integrated CTM magnetic modules; 1 × overhead crane; 1 × stern crane

The City class, also known as Vlissingen class in Netherlands, is a ship class of twelve mine countermeasure vessels (MCMV) in service with the Belgian Navy and Royal Netherlands Navy. The class is the result of a binational programme of Belgium and the Netherlands to replace their ageing Tripartite (Belgium) and Alkmaar (Netherlands) class minehunters. As part of this programme each country ordered six identical MCMVs. The new MCMVs, developed by Naval Group, will include a range of unmanned systems including unmanned surface, aerial and underwater vehicles alongside towed sonars and mine identification and neutralization remotely operated vehicles.

== Design and development ==
In early 2018, the Belgian and Dutch Navies signed a Memorandum of Understanding for the joint construction and financing of the ships. A list of requirements was drawn up for the new vessels. Contenders in the race were:

- The Franco-Belgium consortium made up of French shipbuilders STX France and Socarenam, and Thales together with Belgium's EDR are bidding for the 12 new MCMVs. Their plan includes the construction of MCMVs named Sea Naval Solutions and a multi-role frigate named Deviceseas, which will serve as mothership to the MCMVs. All ships will have a strong focus on autonomous systems operations.
- France's Naval Group and Exail Technologies established Belgian subsidiary Naval & Robotics and bid for the program.
- Imtech Belgium and Damen Group bid for the program.

The contract was won by Naval Group and ECA Robotics on 15 March 2019.

The mine countermeasures vessels have a length of 82 meters and displace 2,800 tonnes. There are a total of around 80 unmanned systems aboard the vessels.

== Construction ==
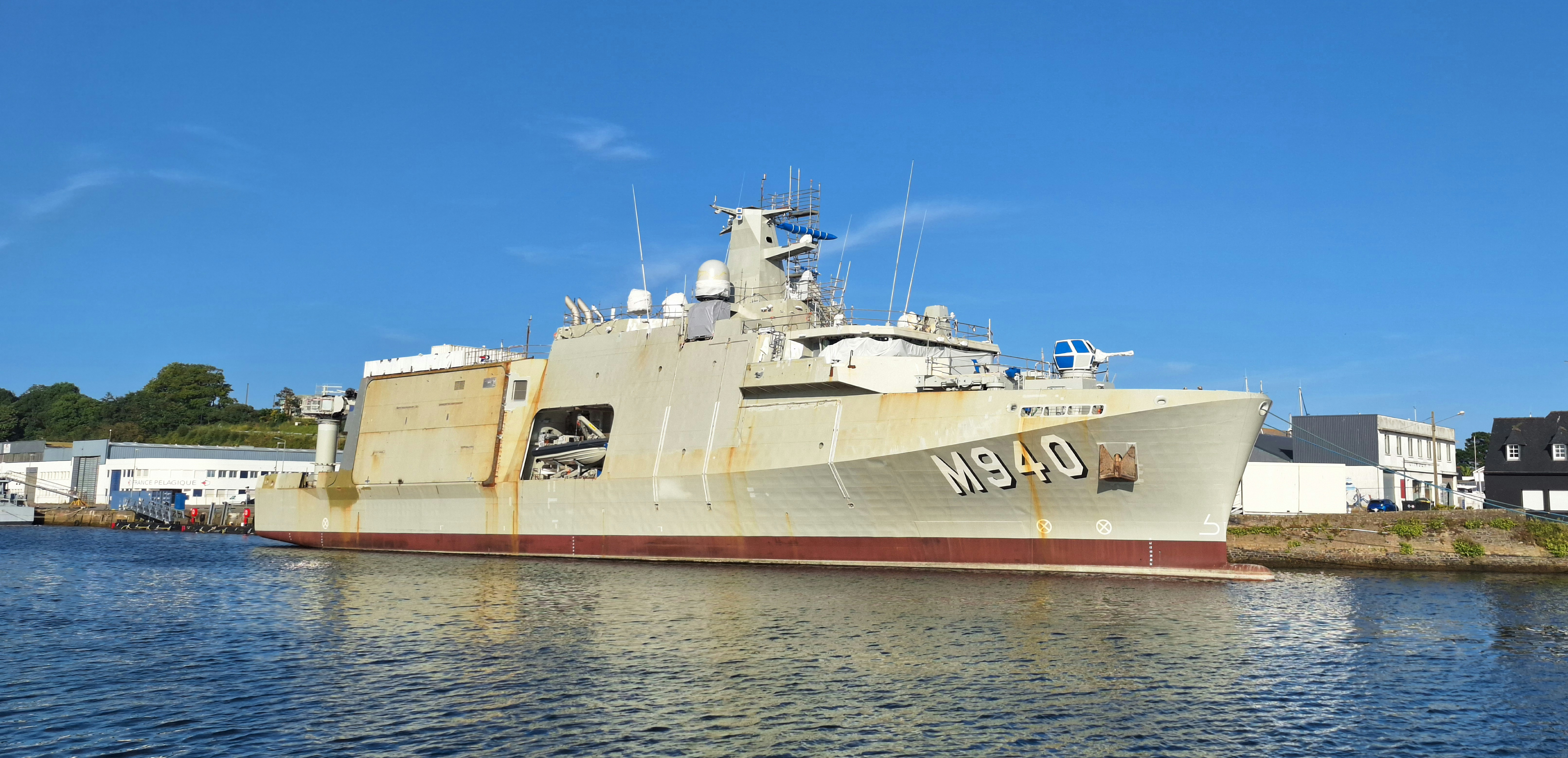
Oostende under construction at Concarneau in 2024

A first steel cutting ceremony for the first-in-class ship for the Belgian Navy was held on 19 July 2021, with the keel being laid on 30 November 2021. Delivery of the first ship to the Belgian Navy is anticipated in 2024 and to the Royal Netherlands Navy in 2025. The first ship for the Royal Netherlands Navy started on the 4 March 2022, with a steel cutting ceremony. The keel was laid on 14 June 2022.

On 8 May 2024, the Belgian Ministry of Defence announced that contractor Belgium Naval & Robotics requested a delay to the construction of the first four vessels citing unforeseen circumstances. The delay caused the first vessel, Oostende, to be delivered eight months later than initially planned, pushing her commissioning back to 2025. The second vessel, Vlissingen, is to be five-to-six months delayed, with Tournai and Scheveningen also seeing delays of two and one month(s) respectively.

In July 2024, it was reported that the first mine countermeasures vessel, Oostende, had begun its sea trials.

In November 2024 it was reported that operational qualification of the drone toolbox is planned to start during the first half of 2025.

In March 2026 it was reported that the first mine countermeasures toolbox had been delivered to Belgium and the Netherlands. This paves the way for the next phase of testing and familiarisation of the systems.

== Equipment ==
=== Mission bay ===
The deployment system for the RHIB and the unmanned surface vessel was developed by Naval Group. The mission bay is to be equipped with the "Launch and recovery system"(LARS).

=== Drones ===
==== Surface vessels ====
The ECA Group INSPECTOR 125 unmanned surface vessel (USV) was ordered to be a centerpiece of the system. It has a low signature (magnetic and acoustic) which would prevent a mine from being triggered. The vessel is also designed to be unsinkable. Its mission is focused on communications and deployment of the drones. The function of these drones can range from explosive weapon detection to explosive weapon identification. The USV can be deployed from the mission bay by a handling system.

== Operators ==
=== Current operators ===
Belgium (2 + 4 on order)
Belgium gave the green-light to start the procurement on 26 January 2018 and approved a budget of 1.1 billion euros for the six Belgian MCMVs. Besides the Tripartite-class minehunters, the ships will also replace the Belgian logistical support ship Godetia.

=== Future operators ===
Netherlands (6)
Contract for the MCMVs in collaboration with Belgium in 2019, critical design review passed in June 2020.

=== Potential operators ===
France
At Euronaval 2022, a partnership was signed between the Belgian, Dutch and French navies to enhance cooperation between them. As a result, the French Navy intends to order six vessels based on the City-class design to fulfill the role of BDGM motherships planned in the ongoing SLAM-F mine warfare program.
Lithuania
A variant of the City-class as a multi-purpose offshore patrol vessel was offered by Naval Group to the Lithuanian Navy in December 2025.

== Ships in class ==
Name	No.	Builder	Laid down	Launched	Delivered	Comm.	Status	Notes
Belgian Navy City class
Oostende	M-940	Piriou Concarneau (hull); Naval Group; ECA Group	30 Nov 2021	29 Mar 2023	3 Nov 2025	3 Nov 2025	In service	
Tournai	M-941	Piriou Concarneau (hull); Naval Group; ECA Group	29 Mar 2023	2 Jul 2024	25 September 2026	–	Delivered	Initially planned for January 2026
Brugge	M-942	Piriou Concarneau (hull); Naval Group; ECA Group	31 Jan 2024	30 Apr 2025	Dec 2026	–	Fitting out	
Liège	M-943	Piriou Concarneau (hull); Naval Group; ECA Group	21 Jan 2025	–	Dec 2027	–	Under construction	
Antwerpen	M-944	Piriou Concarneau (hull); Naval Group; ECA Group	13 Jan 2026	–	Dec 2028	–	Under construction	
Rochefort	M-945	Piriou Concarneau (hull); Naval Group; ECA Group	–	–	Dec 2029	–	–	
Royal Netherlands Navy Vlissingen class
Vlissingen	M-840	Kership Lorient	14 Jun 2022	29 Sep 2023	27 February 2026	–	Navy's sea trials	
Scheveningen	M-841	Shipyard ATG Giurgiu (hull), ECA Group, Kership Lorient (fitting out)	19 Jul 2023	5 Nov 2024	July 2026	–	Under construction	Initially planned for June 2026
IJmuiden	M-842	Shipyard ATG Giurgiu (hull), ECA Group, Kership Lorient (fitting out)	11 Jun 2024	–	June 2027	–	Under construction	
Harlingen	M-843	Shipyard ATG Giurgiu (hull), ECA Group, Kership Lorient (fitting out)	–	–	June 2028	–	–	
Delfzijl	M-844	Shipyard ATG Giurgiu (hull), ECA Group, Kership Lorient (fitting out)	–	–	June 2029	–	–	
Schiedam	M-845	Shipyard ATG Giurgiu (hull), ECA Group, Kership Lorient (fitting out)	–	–	June 2030	–	–	

Planned delivery / commissioning

== See also ==
- Minehunter classes in service
- Future of the Royal Netherlands Navy
