= Giurgiu shipyard =

Coordinates: 43°52′37.4″N 25°58′18.5″E

Shipyards of Romania

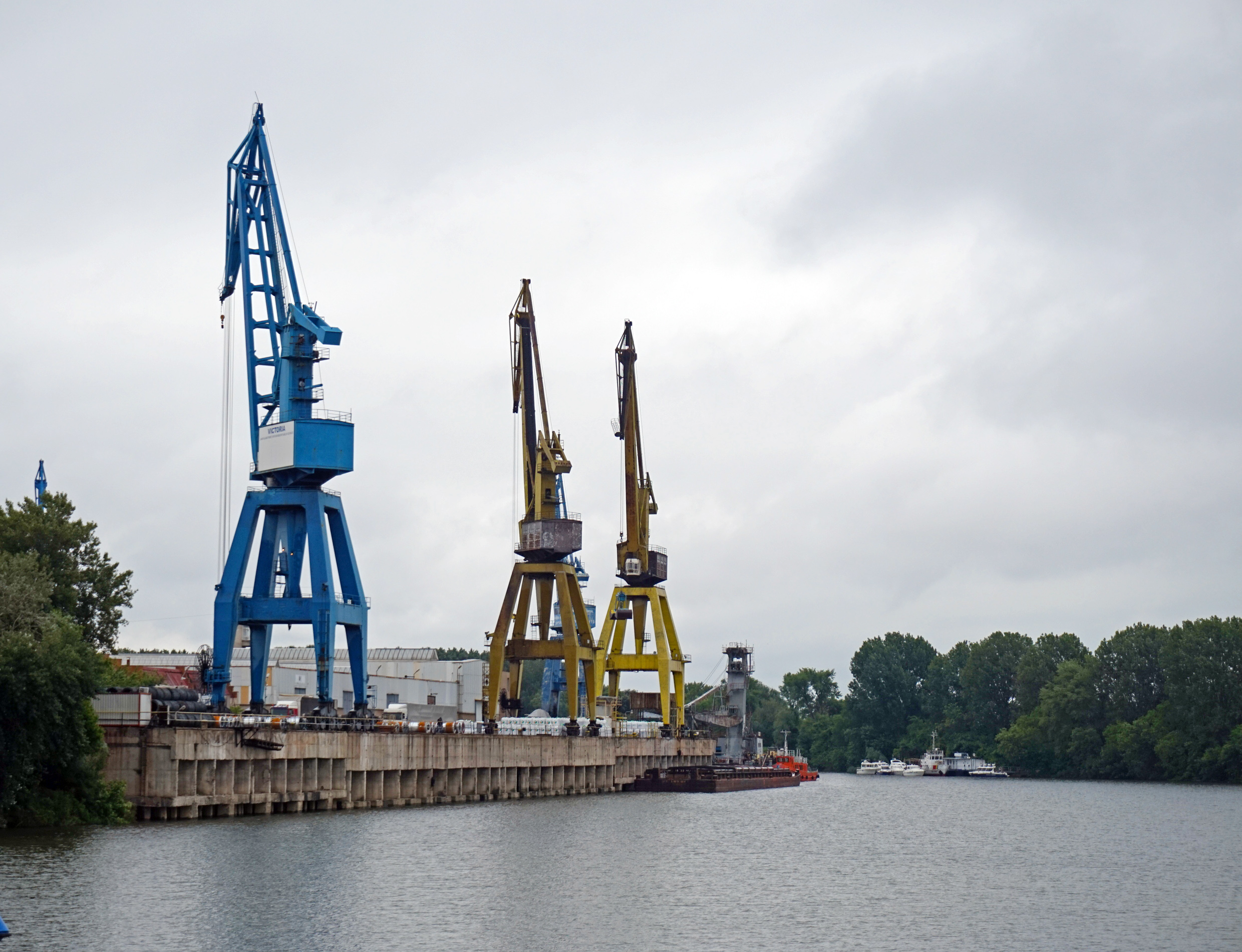
Cranes at the shipyard

The Giurgiu shipyard (Romanian: Șantierul naval Giurgiu), formally Shipyard ATG Giurgiu, is a shipyard located on the Danube in Giurgiu, a city located in the Muntenia region of Romania.

Ship repair began in Giurgiu in 1897. Starting in 1910, the yard’s activity expanded and diversified. However, it remained a fairly small concern until 1973, when the equipment and buildings were modernized. New facilities and workshops were built; henceforward, Giurgiu became a place for building as well as repairing ships. The enlarged site covered 280,000 square meters.

Further modernization took place in 1979-1980, with ship production and repair expanding tremendously during the 1980s. A vertical shiplift was installed in 1985; this is used for both river and sea ships. Other items produced included pushers, floating pumping stations and cranes. In 1989, there were 3600 employees.

Following the Romanian Revolution that year, the shipyard entered a period of severe decline. In 1996, when the Giurgiu Free Zone was established, the shipyard was divided and sold to investors, who used the workshops as storage spaces. Meanwhile, the shipyard changed owners, who declared bankruptcy in 1998. Two attempts to relaunch the company in 1999-2000 failed. Production was halted in April 2002.

The following month, a Romanian investor purchased the workshops, dry dock and shiplift. Production restarted gradually; existing facilities were in poor shape, and modern equipment was purchased. By 2011, the shipyard had become the last remaining industrial unit in Giurgiu. It had launched 20 ships over the preceding two years, with over 90% of orders coming from abroad. There were 300 employees.
