= Mine countermeasures vessel =

Naval ship

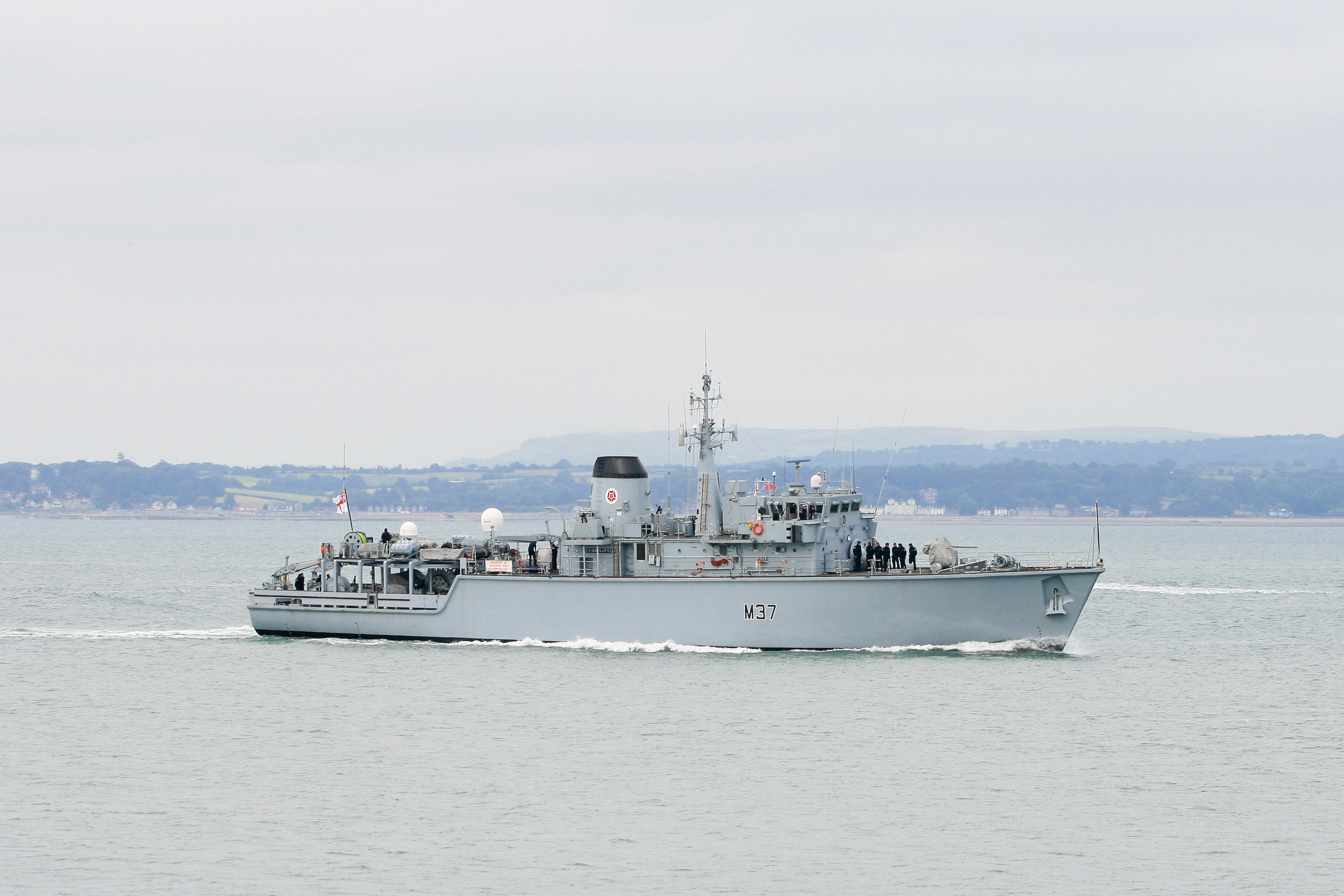
HMS Chiddingfold in 2013.

A mine countermeasures vessel or MCMV is a type of naval ship designed for the locating of and destruction of naval mines which combines the role of a minesweeper and minehunter in one hull. The term MCMV is also applied collectively to minehunters and minesweepers.

== Operation ==
Most modern MCMVs are designed to locate, identify, and neutralize or remove underwater mines. Any explosive device that is placed in or near water to damage or destroy ships, submarines, or other naval vessels is classified as a mine. They can pose a significant threat to naval operations, maritime trade, and coastal security.

The primary purpose of a MCMV is to ensure safe passage for friendly naval and commercial vessels by clearing waterways, harbors, and shipping lanes of potential mine hazards. These vessels use various specialized technologies and techniques to accomplish their mission:

1. Mine Detection: MCMVs are equipped with a variety of sensors and sonar systems that can detect underwater mines. These sensors use sound waves to locate objects on the seabed. They can differentiate between different types of objects and provide data to help operators identify potential mines.
2. Mine Identification: Once a potential mine is detected, MCMVs use remotely operated vehicles (ROVs) or autonomous underwater vehicles (AUVs) to visually inspect and identify the object. This is crucial as some objects on the seabed might be harmless debris rather than actual mines.
3. Mine Neutralization or Removal: If a confirmed mine is detected, MCMVs employ different methods to neutralize or remove the threat. These methods include:
  1. Mine Disposal: Some mines can be remotely detonated using explosive charges attached by the MCMV. This is done carefully to minimize the risk of collateral damage.
  2. Mine Sweeping: MCMVs can tow mine-sweeping equipment that physically cuts the mooring or triggering mechanisms of the mines, rendering them ineffective.
  3. Divers: In certain cases, human divers might be used to defuse or remove mines manually. Contrary to popular belief, there is very little chance of a human triggering a mine because the signature (combination of weight, pressure, movements etc) of diver is significantly different from a boat. However, the risks of submersing, ascending and descending during deep dives still deters such operations.
4. Mine Countermeasures Drones: Some modern MCMVs are equipped with unmanned underwater vehicles (UUVs) or drones that can conduct mine detection, identification, and even disposal tasks without risking human lives.
5. Mine Avoidance: In addition to direct mine countermeasures, MCMVs might also work in conjunction with other naval assets to help ships navigate around known or suspected minefields.

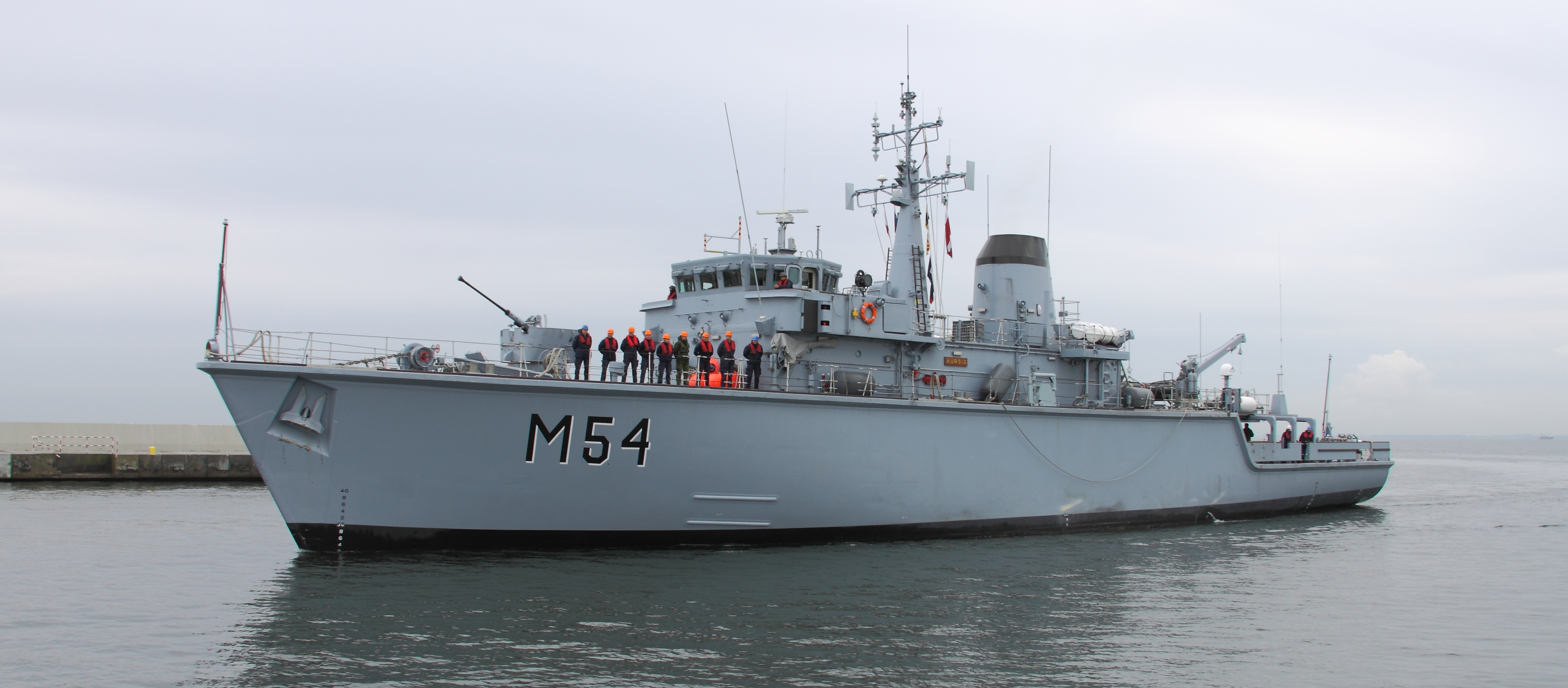
Lithuanian MCMV Ship LKL Kuršis (M54)

These vessels are typically equipped with advanced navigation, communication, and data processing systems to effectively carry out their mission. They often have a dedicated crew of mine warfare specialists, explosive ordnance disposal experts, and naval engineers who work together to ensure safe maritime operations. They play a critical role in maintaining maritime security by locating, identifying, and neutralizing underwater mines, thereby ensuring safe passage for naval and commercial vessels in potentially hazardous waters.

== Classes ==
=== Past ===
- Avenger-class mine countermeasures ship – (United States)
- Lapwing-class minesweeper – (United States)
- Raven-class minesweeper – (United States)
- Auk-class minesweeper – (United States)
- Bullfinch-class minesweeper – (United States)
- Catbird-class minesweeper – (United States)
- Albatross-class minesweeper – (United States)
- Kite-class minesweeper – (United States)
- Adroit-class minesweeper – (United States)
- Hawk-class minesweeper – (United States)
- Admirable-class minesweeper – (United States)

=== Present ===
- Bedok-class mine countermeasures vessel – (Singapore)
- Hunt-class mine countermeasures ship – (United Kingdom)
- Independence-class Littoral Combat ship – (United States)
- Katanpää-class mine countermeasure vessel – (Finland)
- Tripartite-class minehunter – (France)
- Uraga-class mine countermeasure vessel – (Japan)
- Kormoran_2-class minehunter
- A-class minehunter

=== Proposed/Future ===
- City-class mine countermeasures vessel (Belgium)
- Future Mine Counter Measure Vessels (India) – (India)
