= Bofors 40 Mk4 =

Naval gun

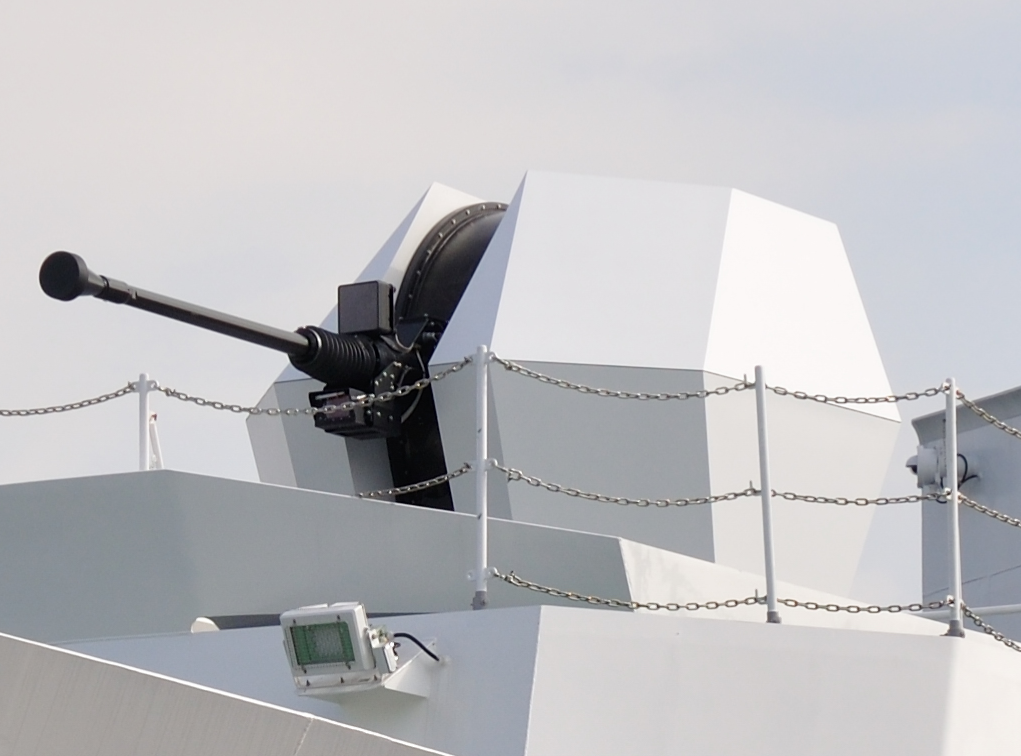
- Bofors 40 Mk4 naval gun with on-mount TV camera and muzzle velocity radar on board the Japanese patrol vessel Shunkō
- Type: Naval gun
- Place of origin: Sweden

Service history
- In service: 2012–present
- Used by: See operators

Production history
- Designer: BAE Systems AB
- Manufacturer: BAE Systems AB
- Produced: 2009–present

Specifications
- Mass: Empty: 2,300 kilograms (5,100 lb)
- Crew: remote controlled with gyro-stabilised local control back-up
- Shell: 40 × 365 cartridge weight 2.5 kilograms (5.5 lb) shell weight 0.975 kilograms (2.15 lb)
- Caliber: 40 mm (1.6 in)
- Elevation: −20°/+80°
- Traverse: 360°
- Rate of fire: 300 rounds/min
- Muzzle velocity: 1,012 m/s (3,320 ft/s)
- Maximum firing range: 12,500 m (7.8 miles)
- Feed system: Magazine capacity: 100 ready rounds

The Bofors 40 Mk4 naval gun system is a lightweight multi-purpose naval cannon. It fires programmable Bofors 40 mm 3P all-target ammunition to engage ships, aircraft, anti-ship missiles and shore targets. It is a modern naval version of the Bofors 40 mm L/70. The gun can engage targets in less than 0.5 seconds after warning.

== Ammunition ==
Bofors 40 mm 3P all-target programmable ammunition allows six modes including three proximity fuzing modes. This increases the flexibility and effectiveness of the gun system, which has further reduced the reaction time of the gun and it is possible to choose ammunition mode at the moment of firing, giving it the ability to switch rapidly between surface targets, air targets, and ground targets. Along with the 40 mm 3P, the gun can also fire other Bofors 40 mm L/70 ammunition and has the capability to rapidly switch between ammunition.

== Variants ==
- Bofors 40 mm Mk 4 L Tridon Mk2: land-based version to install on vehicles such as RMMV HX.

== Users ==
=== Current users ===
Belgium (1 in service, 9 on order)
The Belgian Navy operates it with:
- 1 × City-class mine countermeasures vessel in service, 5 additional on order. The vessels are equipped with 1 × Bofors 40 Mk4 per ship.
- 0 × Anti-Submarine Warfare Frigate in service, 2 on order. Each vessel will be equipped with 2 × Bofors 40 Mk4.
Brazil (3 in service, 2 on order)
The Brazilian Navy operates it with:
- 3 × Macaé-class patrol vessel (Maracanã, Mangaratiba and Miramar). Each vessel is equipped with 1 × Bofors 40 Mk4.
- 0 × PRONAPA (Patrol Vessel Construction Project), 2 on order. The vessels are equipped with 1 × Bofors 40 Mk4 per ship.
Finland (4)
The Finniah Navy operates it with:
- 4 × Hamina-class missile boat (installed during MLU). Each vessel is equipped with 1 × Bofors 40 Mk4.
Japan (4)
The Japanese Coast Guard operates it with:
- 4 × Shunkō class patrol vessel. Each vessel is equipped with 1 × Bofors 40 Mk4.
Netherlands (1 in service, 9 on order)
The Royal Netherlands Navy operates it with:
- 1 × City-class mine countermeasures vessel in service, 5 additional on order. The vessels are equipped with 1 × Bofors 40 Mk4 per ship.
- 0 × Anti-Submarine Warfare Frigate in service, 2 on order. Each vessel will be equipped with 2 × Bofors 40 Mk4.
Sweden (2 in service, > 4 on order)
The Swedish Navy ordered 2 canons in 2019 without mentioning on which ship it would be used. But it will also use it with:
- 0 × Luleå-class frigate in service, 4 on order. Each vessel will be equipped with 1 × Bofors 40 Mk4.
The FMV ordered the TRIDON Mk2, which uses this turret, in April 2026. The system is expected to be used by the Swedish Army, the Air Force, and maybe some to be donated to Ukraine.

=== Future users ===
Colombia
The Colombian Navy will operate it with:
- 1 × Damen Sigma 10514-class frigate (up to 5 in total). The vessels will be equipped with 1 × Bofors 40 Mk4 per ship.
United Kingdom
The Royal Navy will operate it with:
- 5 × Type 31 frigate. The vessels will be equipped with 2 × Bofors 40 Mk4 per ship.
