= Bulgarian frigate Gordi =

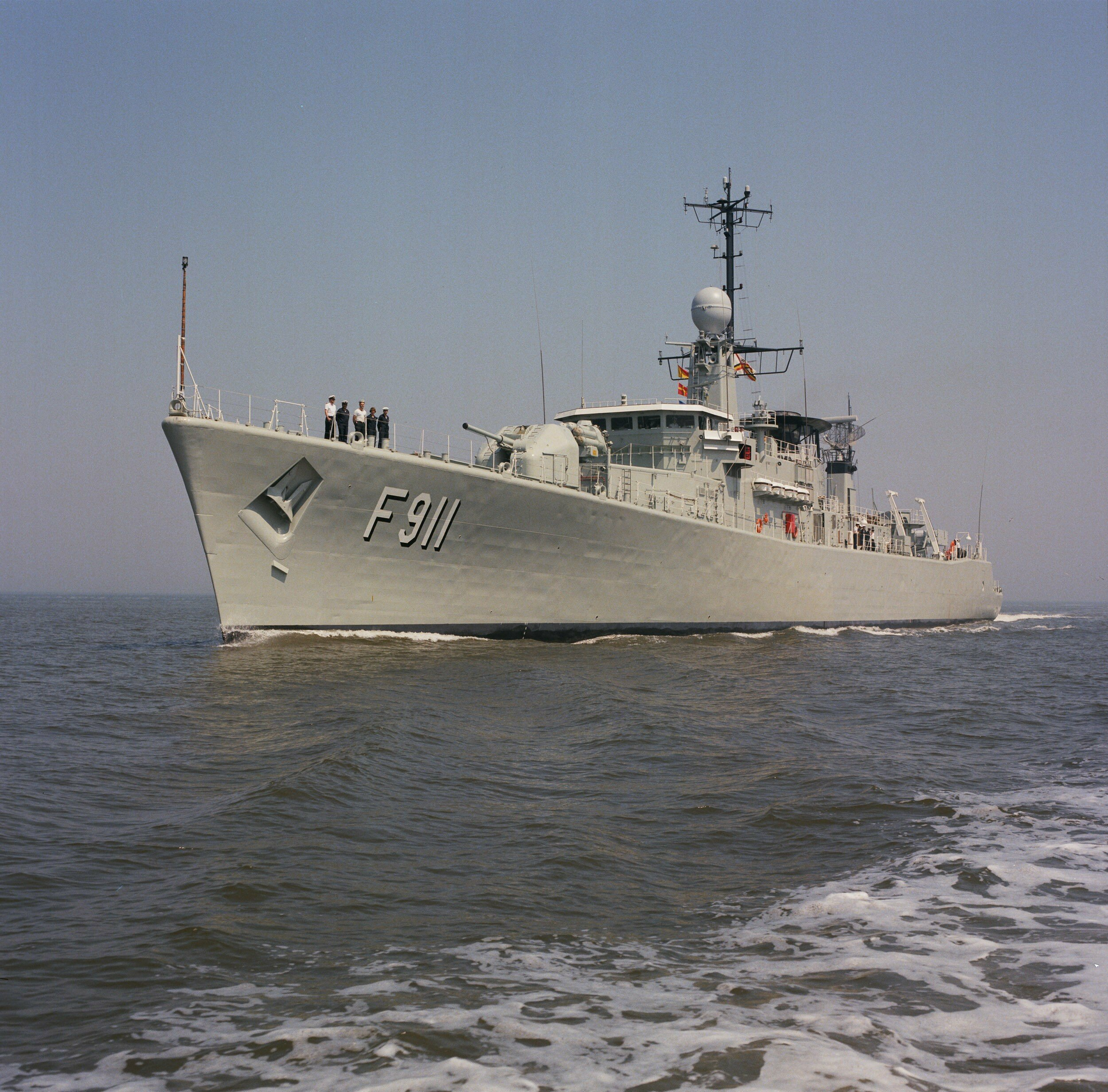
- Westdiep in 1985

History

Belgium
- Name: Westdiep
- Builder: Cockerill Yards, Hoboken, Antwerp
- Laid down: 2 September 1974
- Launched: 8 December 1975
- Christened: 20 January 1978
- Decommissioned: 5 October 2007
- Home port: Zeebrugge Naval Base
- Motto: "Altum est Regnum Meum"
- Fate: Sold to Bulgaria in February 2008

Bulgaria
- Name: Gordi
- Acquired: February 2009
- Status: In service

General characteristics
- Class & type: Wielingen-class frigate
- Displacement: 2,200 tonnes
- Length: 106.38 m (349.0 ft)
- Beam: 12.30 m (40.4 ft)
- Draught: 5.60 m (18.4 ft)
- Propulsion: Combined diesel or gas turbine; 2 × ABC type DZC diesel engines providing 4,200 hp (3,130 kW) each; 1 × Rolls-Royce Olympus T M - 3 B gasturbine providing 27.575 hp (21 kW); 2 inverted screws with variable pitch
- Speed: 28 knots (52 km/h)
- Range: 6,000 nautical miles (11,000 km) at 16 knots (30 km/h)
- Complement: 14 officers, 84 NCOs and 59 sailors
- Armament: 1 100 mm Creusot-Loire automatic cannon; 1 RIM-7 Sea Sparrow launcher with 8 missiles; 1 MM-38 Exocet launcher with 4 missiles; 1 375mm Bofors depth charge launcher; 2 Ecan Type L5 torpedo tubes with 10 torpedoes

Gordi (Bulgarian: Горди, lit. 'Proud') is a Wielingen-class frigate of the Bulgarian Navy with number 43. She was originally commissioned as Westdiep in the Belgian Navy.

== Construction and career ==
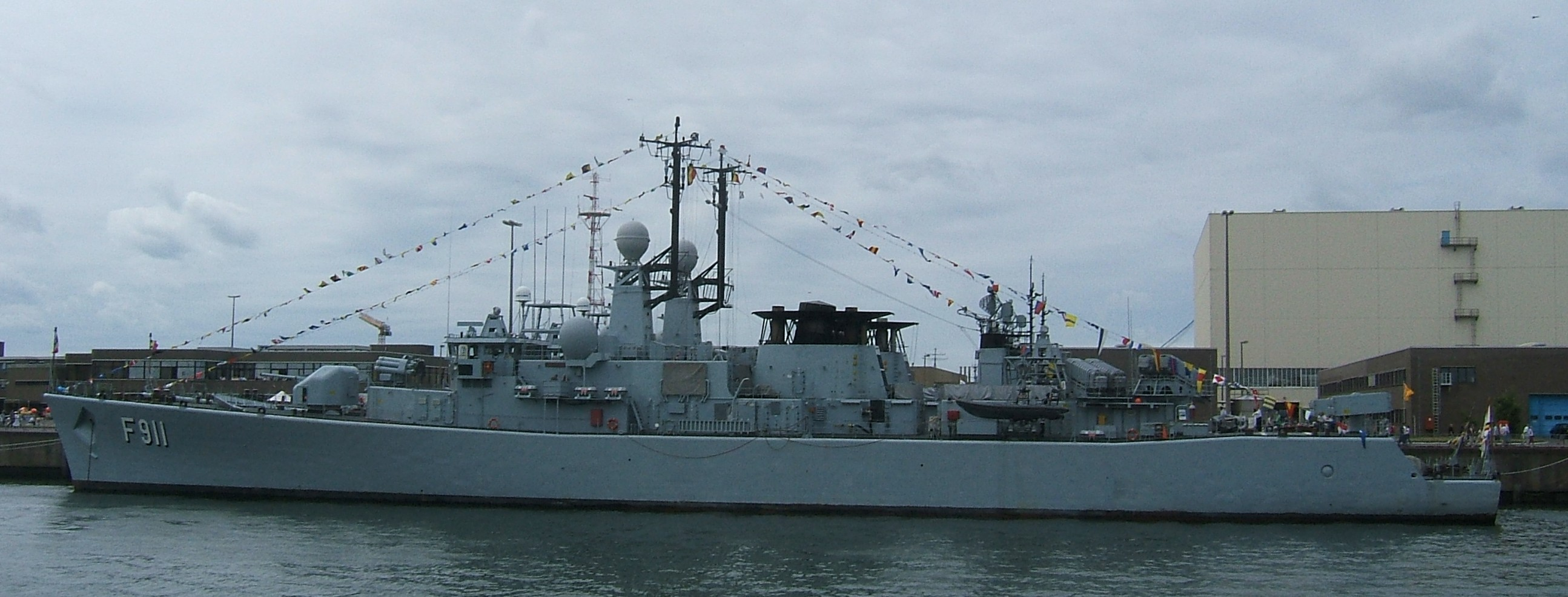
F911 Westdiep at Zeebrugge

Westdiep was launched on 8 December 1975 at the Cockerill Yards in Hoboken, and christened by Princess Astrid of Belgium, on 20 January 1978. The patronage of the Westdiep was accepted by the city of Sint-Niklaas. Westdiep was the second ship in the Wielingen class. She had the pennant number F911.

On 5 October 2007 Westdiep, by then the last commissioned frigate of Belgian construction in the Belgian Navy, was withdrawn from service.

She was sold to the Bulgarian Navy together with her sister, Wielingen. Another sistership, Wandelaar had already been sold to Bulgaria. Westdiep entered service with them under the name Gordi, and with the pennant number 43.
