= Wielingen-class frigate =

Class of frigates in the Belgian Navy

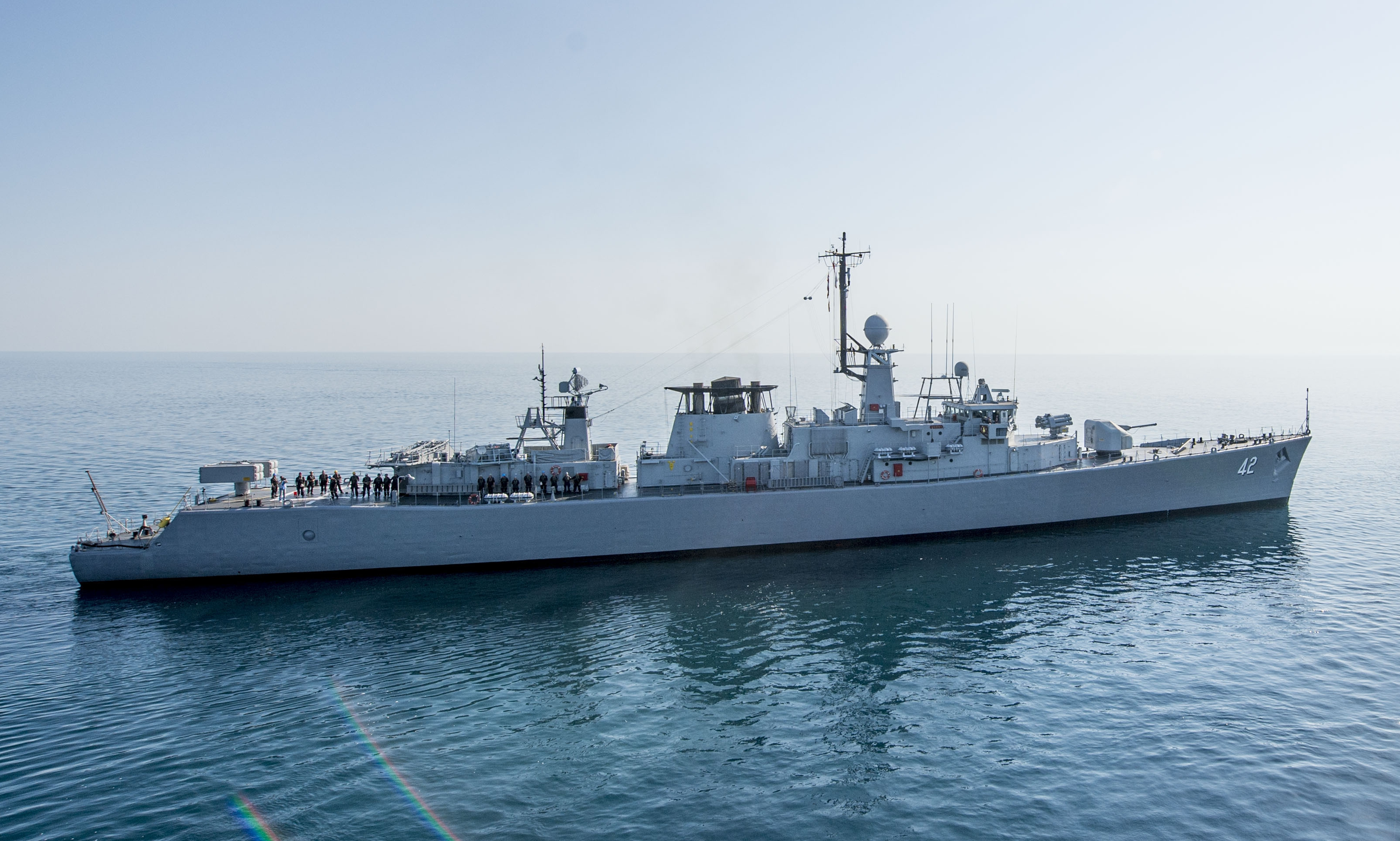
- Verni, the former Wielingen, in 2015

Class overview
- Name: Wielingen class
- Builders: Boelwerf Shipyard; Cockerill Shipyard
- Operators: Belgian Navy; Bulgarian Navy
- Preceded by: Algerine class
- Succeeded by: Karel Doorman class
- Built: 1974–1978
- In commission: 1976–present
- Planned: 4
- Completed: 4
- Active: 3
- Scrapped: 1

General characteristics
- Type: Guided-missile frigate
- Displacement: 2,283 t (2,247 long tons) at full load
- Length: 106.4 m (349 ft 1 in) oa
- Beam: 12.3 m (40 ft 4 in)
- Draught: 5.6 m (18 ft 4 in)
- Propulsion: CODOG; 2 Cockerill CO 240 V12 diesel engines, 4,500 kW (6,000 bhp); 1 Rolls-Royce Olympus TM3B gas turbine, 21,000 kW (28,000 shp)
- Speed: 28 knots (52 km/h; 32 mph)
- Range: 4,500 nmi (8,300 km; 5,200 mi) at 18 kn (33 km/h; 21 mph)
- Complement: 160
- Sensors & processing systems: 1 Hollandse Signaal Apparaten DA-05 surveillance radar; 1 Hollandse Signaal Apparaten WM-25 targeting radar; 2 EOMS IR/Video optical targeting cameras; 1 AN/SQS-510 sonar
- Armament: 1 100 mm Creusot-Loire automatic cannon; 1 RIM-7 Sea Sparrow launcher with 8 missiles; 1 MM38 Exocet launcher with 4 missiles; 1 375 mm Creusot-Loire depth charge launcher; 2 ECAN Type L5 torpedo tubes with 10 torpedoes

The Wielingen class is a class of four multi-functional frigates constructed for and operated by the Belgian Naval Component. In service from 1976 to 2008 with the Belgians, three of the class were sold to Bulgaria for service with the Bulgarian Navy beginning in 2004. The fourth, Westhinder, ran aground in 1988, was decommissioned in 1993 and was scrapped.

== Design and description ==
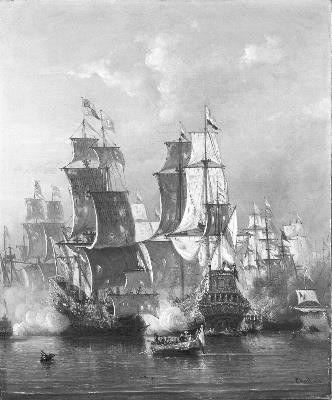
The sea battle in the Wielingen, off Zeeland in 1666

The Belgian government began studies in 1969 for a new type of escort that would meet the requirements of escort missions in the North Sea and English Channel during the Cold War. The design would be limited to weapon systems already in service with or under development by NATO navies. The design also emphasized seaworthiness, automation and watertight integrity. (Note: Moore has the program approved on 23 June 1971 with design studies only commenced in July 1973.) The weapons systems, with the exception of the Sea Sparrow surface-to-air missile (SSM), were French. The radar and tactical data systems were Dutch and the hull and machinery were constructed in Belgium. As part of the project, the Belgian government made Belgian shipbuilding participation mandatory in the construction of the new ships.

The frigates feature an action information centre between decks and the ships could be split into two independent gas-tight citadels in the case of nuclear, biological or chemical warfare. All machinery could be controlled from a central control station. The vessels measured 103.0 metres (337 ft 11 in) long between perpendiculars and 106.4 m (349 ft 1 in) overall with a beam of 12.3 m (40 ft 4 in) and a draught of 5.6 m (18 ft 4 in). (Note: Gardiner, Chumbley & Budzbon have the draught at 5.3 m (17 ft 5 in).) The ships had a light displacement of 1,880 tonnes (1,850 long tons) and 2,283 t (2,247 long tons) at full load. By 2004, the light displacement had increased to 1,940 t (1,910 long tons) and to 2,430 t (2,390 long tons) at full load.

The ships are propelled by a two-shaft combined diesel or gas (CODOG) system. This is composed of a single Rolls-Royce Olympus TM3B gas turbine creating 21,000 kilowatts (28,000 shp) and giving the frigates a maximum speed of 28 knots (52 km/h; 32 mph) or two Cockerill CO 240 V12 diesel engines creating 4,500 kW (6,000 bhp) with a maximum speed of 20 knots (37 km/h; 23 mph) on both diesels or 15 knots (28 km/h; 17 mph) on just one. These turned controllable pitch propellers. The frigates have a range of 4,500 nautical miles (8,300 km; 5,200 mi) at 18 knots (33 km/h; 21 mph). The vessels also had four 500 kW diesel alternators for electric production. They had a complement of 160 including 15 officers in Belgian service.

The Wielingen class were armed with four launchers for MM38 Exocet anti-ship missiles, later converted to two twin launchers. They were equipped with a Mark 29 octuple launcher for eight RIM-7M Sea Sparrow SAMs. These were later upgraded to the RIM-7P model. The frigates also mount a single 100-millimetre (3.9 in)/55 calibre modèle 68 naval gun, one six-barrelled Creusot-Loire 375 mm (14.8 in) anti-submarine warfare (ASW) rocket launcher with Bofors rockets, and two catapults for L5 torpedoes. (Note: "/55 calibre" refers to the length of the gun in terms of calibres, or the bore diameter of the gun.) The class was fitted with two eight-barrelled Corvus chaff launchers, a Sagem Vigy 105 optronic director, a Signaal DA-05 air/surface search radar, a WM-25 surface search radar, SQS-510 hull-mounted sonar, and the SEWACO IV tactical data system with Link 11 capability. They were also given Argos AR 900 intercept electronic support measures and SLQ-25 Dixie torpedo decoy system.

== Ships in the class ==
Wielingen class construction data
Name	Pennant number	Builder	Laid down	Launched	Commissioned	Decommissioned	Status/Fate
Wielingen	F910	Boelwerf, Temse	5 March 1974	30 March 1976	20 January 1978	2006	Sold to Bulgaria in 2008, refurbished and commissioned as Verni (Верни – Faithful) (42)
Westdiep	F911	Cockerill, Hoboken, Antwerp	2 September 1974	8 December 1975	20 January 1978	5 October 2007	Sold to Bulgaria in 2008, refurbished and commissioned as Gordi (Горди – Proud) (43)
Wandelaar	F912	Boelwerf, Temse	28 March 1975 (Note: Gardiner, Chumbley & Budzbon have the date as 5 March 1975.)	21 June 1977	3 October 1978	2004	Sold to Bulgaria in 2004, refurbished and commissioned as Drazki (Дръзки – Daring) (41)
Westhinder	F913	Cockerill, Hoboken, Antwerp	8 December 1975	30 March 1976	20 January 1978	1 July 1993	Ran aground in 1988. Scrapped 7 November 2000

== Construction and career ==
The construction programme of four ships was approved on 23 June 1971 and an order was placed with two Belgian shipyards in October 1973. Construction of the ships began in 1974. The first two ships, Wielingen and Westdiep, were first delivered in December 1976. However, they were both sent back to their yards for an engine overhaul which was completed in 1977. The four ships, including the final two Wandelaar and Westhinder, all entered service in 1978. All four ships were based at Zeebrugge. Westhinder was damaged during an anti-submarine exercise off the coast of Norway in September 1988, striking a rock. The ship was decommissioned on 1 July 1993 and then used as a parts hulk for the other frigates. The hulk was towed to Ghent for scrapping on 7 November 2000. Following the loss of Westhinder, two of the frigates were kept operational while the third was placed in reserve or under refit. The third ship, Wandelaar, was decommissioned in 2004 and was sold to the Bulgarian Navy the same year. Wielingen and Westdiep were decommissioned in 2007 and sold to Bulgaria in 2008.

=== Bulgarian naval service ===
Bulgaria joined NATO in 2004 and sought out options to replace their older Soviet-era fleet to fulfill their obligations with the organisation. In May 2004 the Bulgarian government agreed to purchase new equipment for the Bulgarian Navy. On 4 December 2004, a letter of intent was signed by the government and the first ship, Wandelaar was acquired. Approval of the purchase came only on 17 March 2005 and Wandelaar was transferred to Bulgaria in October 2005. The ship was renamed Drazki. Drazki was followed by the remaining two frigates of the class, with confirmation of their acquisition on 7 December 2007. Bulgaria took possession of Westdiep on 22 August 2008 and renamed the frigate Gordi followed by Wielingen in February 2009 which was renamed Verni. In 2011 Drazki took part in NATO operations against Libya and since then, the vessels have participated in several naval exercises with Turkey.

== See also ==
- List of frigate classes by country

Equivalent frigates of the same era

- Lupo class
- Koni class
- Type 21
- Type 053
- Almirante Padilla class
- Ulsan class
