= List of ship commissionings in 2005 =

The list of ship commissionings in 2005 includes a chronological list of all ships commissioned in 2005.

	Operator	Ship	Flag	Class and type	Pennant	Other notes
16 February	Japan Maritime Self-Defense Force	Sazanami		Takanami-class destroyer	DD-113	
19 February	United States Navy	Jimmy Carter		Seawolf-class submarine	SSN-23	
28 April	Mexican Navy	Río Tuxpan		Pierce-class survey ship	BI-12	Ex-NOAAS Whiting (S 329)
5 March	United States Navy	Nitze		Arleigh Burke-class destroyer	DDG-94	
28 May	(United States) National Oceanic and Atmospheric Administration	Oscar Dyson		Oscar Dyson-class fisheries research ship	R 224	
10 June	Royal Netherlands Navy	Evertsen		De Zeven Provinciën-class frigate	F805	
24 June	Royal Australian Navy	Armidale		Armidale-class patrol boat	ACPB 83	
11 July	Indian Navy	Beas		Brahmaputra-class frigate	F37	
30 July	United States Navy	Halsey		Arleigh Burke-class destroyer	DDG-97	
1 October	(Malta) Maritime Squadron AFM	P61		Diciotti-class offshore patrol vessel	P61	
21 October	Bulgarian Navy	Drazki		Wielingen-class frigate	F41	Ex-Wandelaar
12 November	United States Navy	Bainbridge		Arleigh Burke-class destroyer	DDG-96	
December	French Navy	Mistral		Mistral-class amphibious assault ship	L9013	First in class
16 December	Chilean Navy	Almirante Latorre		Jacob van Heemskerck-class frigate	FFG-14	Ex-Jacob van Heemskerck
