= Belgian frigate Westhinder =

1978–1993 Wielingen-class frigate

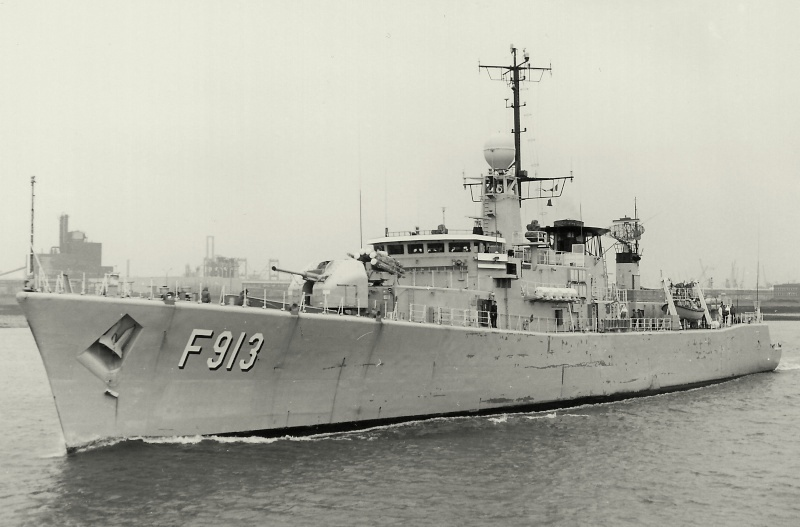

History

Belgium
- Name: Westhinder
- Builder: Cockerill Yards, Hoboken, Antwerp
- Laid down: 5 March 1974
- Launched: 30 March 1976
- Christened: 20 January 1978
- Decommissioned: 1993
- Home port: Zeebrugge Naval Base
- Fate: Scrapped

General characteristics
- Class & type: Wielingen-class frigate
- Displacement: 2,390 t (2,350 long tons) full load
- Length: 106.38 m (349.0 ft)
- Beam: 12.30 m (40.4 ft)
- Draught: 5.30 m (17.4 ft)
- Propulsion: Combined diesel or gas turbine; 2 × ABC type DZC diesel engines providing 4,200 hp (3,100 kW) each; 1 × Rolls-Royce Olympus T M - 3 B gasturbine providing 27.575 hp; 2 Inverted screws with variable pitch
- Speed: 28 knots (52 km/h)
- Range: 6,000 mi (9,700 km) at 16 knots (30 km/h)
- Complement: 14 officers, 71 NCOs and 74 sailors
- Sensors & processing systems: Holland Signaal DA 05
- Armament: 1 100 mm Creusot-Loire automatic cannon; 1 RIM-7 Sea Sparrow launcher with 8 missiles; 1 MM-38 Exocet launcher with 4 missiles; 1 375mm Bofors depth charge launcher; 2 Ecan Type L5 torpedo tubes with 10 torpedoes

Westhinder was a Wielingen-class frigate of the Belgian Navy.

== Construction and career ==
Westhinder was launched on 30 March 1976 at the Cockerill Yards in Hoboken, Antwerp, and christened by Queen Fabiola of Belgium, on 20 January 1978. The patronage of the Westhinder was accepted by the city of Malmedy. Westhinder was the last ship in the Wielingen-class, and had pennant number F913.

It sustained damage during a NATO exercise off the coast of Norway.
