= Belgian Navy =

Naval warfare branch of the Belgian Armed Forces

- Marine (Dutch); Marine (French)
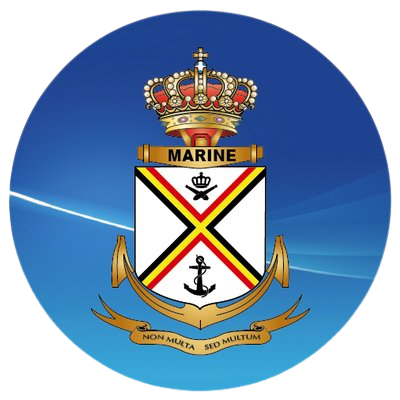
- Founded: 15 January 1831
- Country: Belgium
- Type: Navy
- Role: Maritime warfare
- Size: 1,354 (2022)
- Part of: Belgian Armed Forces
- Garrison/HQ: Zeebrugge, Bruges, Ostend
- Ship classes: Karel Doorman-class frigate; City-class mine countermeasures vessel

Commanders
- Commander: Divisional admiral Tanguy Botman
- Admiral Benelux: Vice admiral Harold Liebregs

Insignia
- Naval ensign

- Naval jack

The Belgian Navy (Dutch: Marine, French: Marine) of the Belgian Armed Forces, is the naval service of Belgium.

== History ==
=== Early history ===
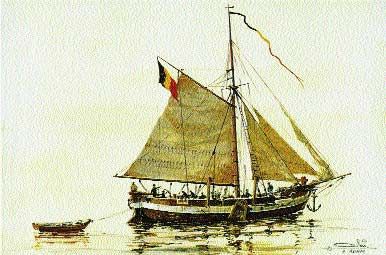
One of the first gunboats of the Marine Royale

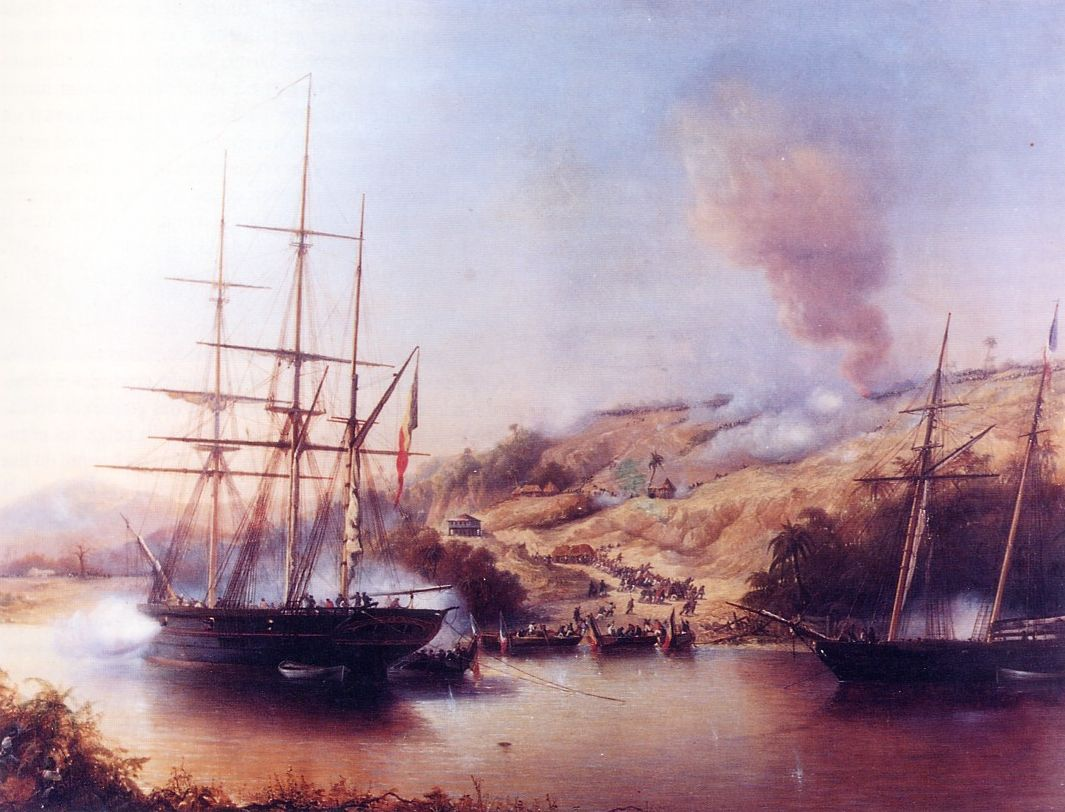
French and Belgian warships during the Rio Nuñez Incident in West Africa, 1849

The Belgian Navy was created as the Marine Royale (English: Royal Navy) on 15 January 1831. The force has operated in various forms throughout Belgian history.

When the country became independent after the Belgian Revolution of 1830, a Dutch squadron blocked the Scheldt estuary. To deal with this threat the Belgian Congress ordered two brigantines to be built, which bore the names Congrès and Les Quatre Journées. After the French Army, led by Marshal Count Gérard, captured the citadel of Antwerp in 1832, the captured Dutch gun boats were pressed into Belgian service. In 1840 the Belgian government bought the schooner Louise Marie and in 1845 the brig Duc de Brabant. Louise Marie participated in the Rio Nuñez Incident in 1849. In 1862, the Belgian government discarded its navy and pursued a minimalistic naval policy.

=== Disbandment ===
In April 1862 the existing royal navy was disbanded as an economy measure. The navy's personnel were transferred to a "state navy force" manning small vessels and employed in non-military functions such as the provision of ferry services, inspection of incoming vessels and charting research. The need for a proper naval service to provide coastal and port defence was raised periodically but did not progress beyond the retention as a reserve of four lightly armed gunboats, moored in the Port of Antwerp and crewed by members of the Belgian Army's Engineering Corps.

=== World War I ===
At the outbreak of World War I, Belgium had no navy (an impromptu force was assembled at the Battle for Lake Tanganyika) but the war caused this policy to change and a Corps of Destroyers and Sailors was created in 1917. The Belgian naval personnel served onboard French minesweepers and provided the artillerymen for Belgian merchant ships. The Treaty of Versailles allocated Belgium 11 torpedo boats and 26 minesweepers. For budgetary reasons, Belgium again abolished its navy in 1927.

=== World War II ===
In 1939, against the looming threat of a new war with Germany, Belgium once again resurrected its navy as the Naval Corps. This new navy, consisting mostly of small patrol vessels and coastal artillery units, lasted barely a year until the German invasion of May 1940. During the 18 days campaign, the trawler A4 evacuated much of the government's gold reserve to Britain, while several others helped at the Allied evacuation at Dunkirk.

During World War II many members of the Naval Corps, together with Belgian fishermen and merchant sailors, escaped to Britain with the explicit wish of fighting the German occupiers. The Royal Navy took advantage of this opportunity to enlist the Belgians into separate groups of more or less entirely Belgian-crewed ships. From 1940 to 1946, the Belgian Section of the British Royal Navy crewed two corvettes, (Buttercup and Godetia), a squadron of MMS minesweepers and three patrol boats (Phrontis, Electra and Kernot). In 1946, Britain donated the ships to Belgium. These vessels became the backbone of the new Belgian Navy.

=== Cold War ===
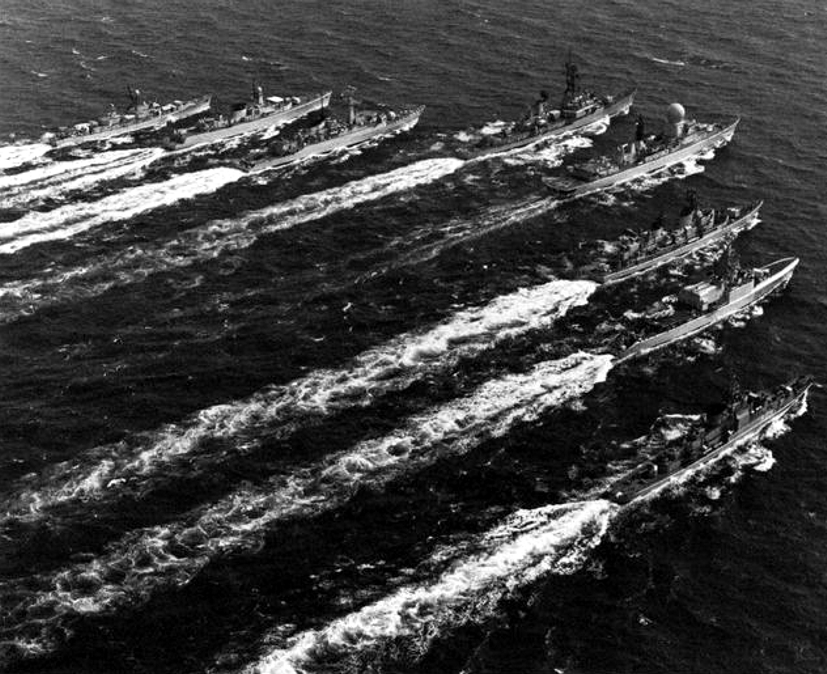
Westhinder (second from the top) with NATO Standing Naval Force Atlantic in 1981

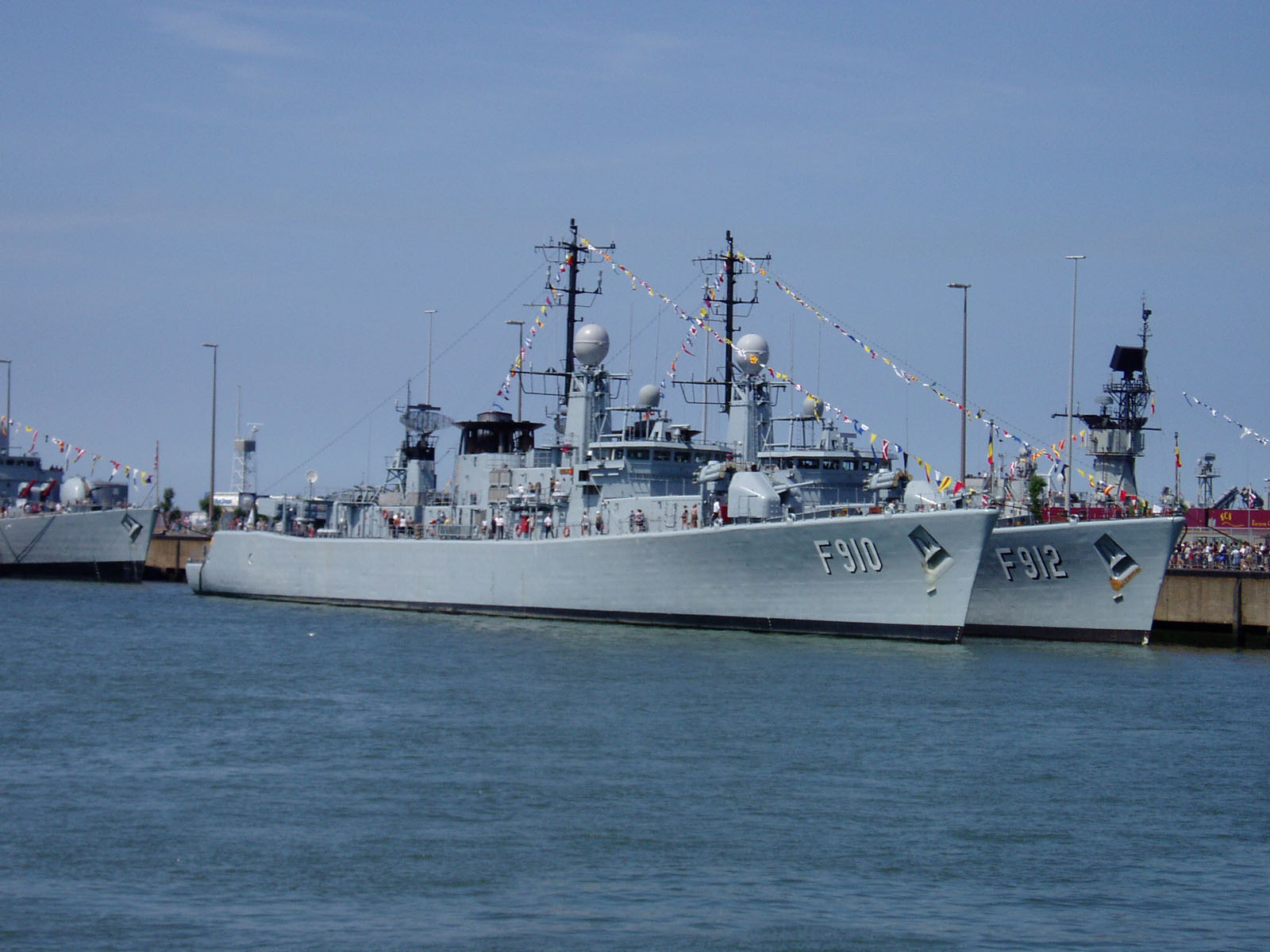
Wielingen-class frigates in 2003

The Belgian Navy was expanded in the late 1940s and the 1950s with the transfer of former U.S., British, and Commonwealth warships. After Belgium became a member of NATO, the role of the Belgian Navy was to help secure the North Sea, the English Channel, and the Western Approaches in cooperation with other navies in northwestern Europe. The first major surface ships that Belgium received were six Algerine-class minesweepers from the United Kingdom. They also received the Agile and Adjutant minesweepers from the United States. Later developments occurred in the 1970s, when the natively designed Belgian Wielingen-class frigates were built, and in the 1980s when Belgium, France, and the Netherlands launched the Tripartite-class minehunters.

=== Post-Cold War ===
In the beginning of the nineties, the end of the Cold War caused the Belgian government to restructure the Belgian Armed Forces in order to cope with the changed threats. This led to a reduction in the size of the Armed Forces. With regards to the Belgian navy, these cutbacks meant that one Wielingen-class frigate was taken out of service and that three Tripartite-class minehunters were sold to France. In 2002, the government decided to impose a "single structure" on the armed forces in which the independent Belgian Marine Royale ceased to exist. The former Navy became the Belgian Naval Component (COMOPSNAV) of the Armed Forces; it is also generally referred to as the Belgian Navy.

On 20 July 2005, the Belgian government decided to buy two of the remaining six Dutch M-class frigates to replace the two remaining frigates of the Wielingen class (Wielingen and Westdiep) at the time still in service with the Belgian Navy, which in turn were sold to Bulgaria. On 21 December 2005, the Dutch government sold Karel Doorman (F827) and Willem Van Der Zaan (F829) to Belgium. The two ships were sold for about 250 million Euros. These two M-class frigates entered service with the Belgian Navy where they were renamed Leopold I and Louise-Marie. In October 2005, the Wielingen-class frigate Wandelaar was officially handed over to the Bulgarian Navy, which christened the ship as Drăzki ('The Bolds'). The remaining ships of the class were transferred to Bulgaria as well, after completing modernization in Belgium. A Tripartite-class minehunter, Myosotis, which was renamed Tsibar was transferred to Bulgaria soon after.

The current Commander of the Belgian Navy is Rear Admiral Jan De Beurme (since September 2020).

In February 2013 it was announced that Belgium had ordered two 52-metre (171 ft) patrol vessels from the French shipyard SOCARENAM, to be delivered within two years. Both were received, P901 Castor in 2014 and P902 Pollux in early 2015. The two vessels are to remain in service until 2044–2045.

== Mission ==
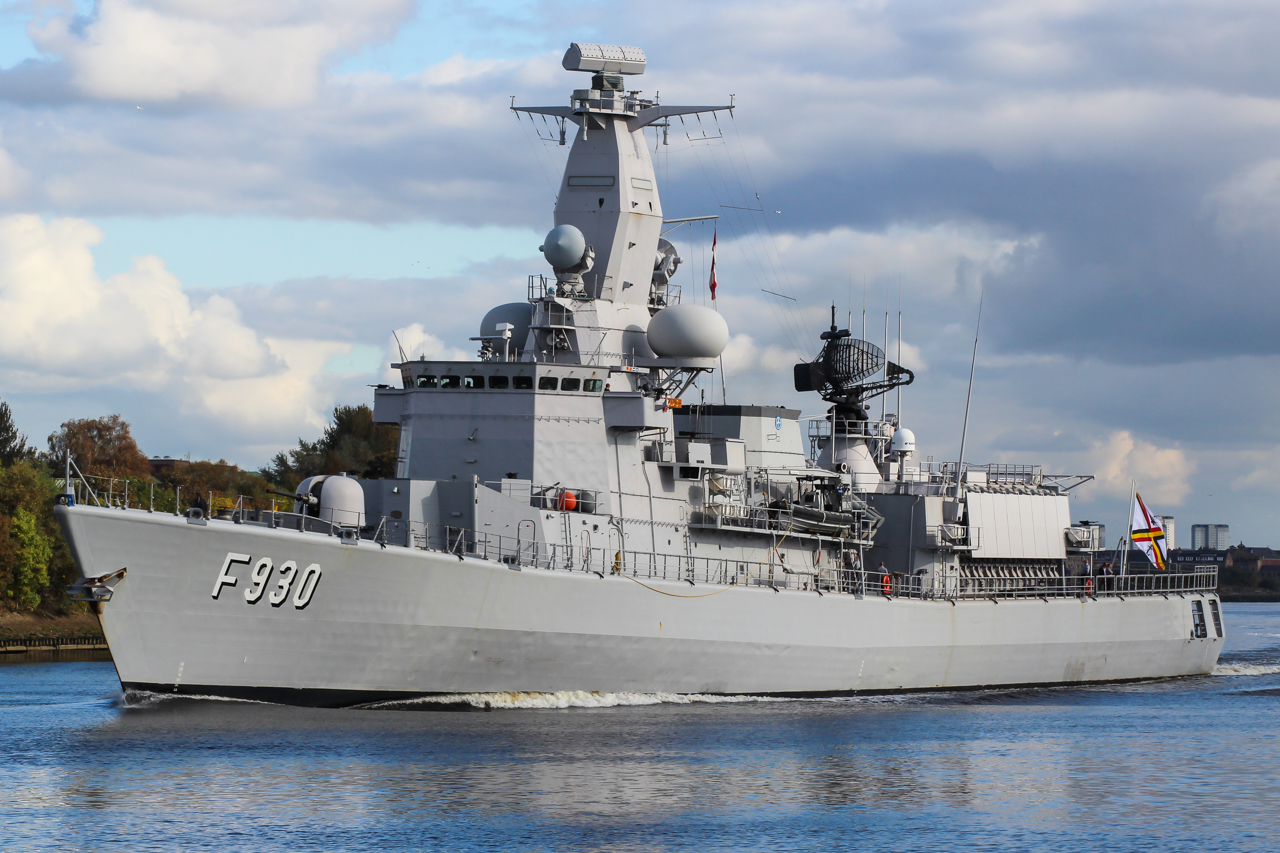
Leopold I, a Belgian Karel Doorman-class frigate

In times of crisis and war the Belgian Navy will manage, with the support of its allies, the crises rising from the infringements to the principles of International law and from the Humans right and exercise the Belgian sovereignty in the maritime zones where the Belgian Navy is qualified, defend the underwater communication lines, main roads and allied, and protect the ports against any air, surface or underwater attack.

In times of peace the Belgian Navy has the following roles:

- To ensure the presence of Belgium at sea.
- To support our diplomacy and our foreign trade.
- Technical and military collaboration with the allied countries.
- Participation in humanitarian actions.
- Contribute to the nation in the maritime zones for which Belgium is responsible:
  - Contribution to oceanographic search.
  - Control of fishing
  - Contribution to the control of pollution at sea.
  - Participation in the plan of assistance in territorial waters
  - Support for customs and police operations
  - Detection of wrecks.
  - Participation in rescues at sea.
  - Contribution to the training of the commercial naval officers
  - Control of territorial waters and the exclusive economic zone.
  - If necessary, opening of the centre of hyperbaric medicine to the population.
  - Destruction of explosive devices at sea
- Preparation with the tasks to be carried out in times of crisis and war.
- Contribution to dissuasion at sea by the means of permanent allied squadrons.

== Organisation ==
=== Ranks ===
==== Officer ranks ====
NATO code	OF-10	OF-9	OF-8	OF-7	OF-6	OF-5	OF-4	OF-3		OF-2	OF-1
Belgian Navy
Belgian Navy		Admiraal	Vice-admiraal	Divisieadmiraal	Flottieljeadmiraal	Kapitein-ter-zee	Fregatkapitein	Korvetkapitein	Luitenant-ter-zee 1ste klasse	Luitenant-ter-zee	Vaandrig-ter-zee	Vaandrig-ter-zee 2de klasse
Belgian Navy		Amiral	Vice-amiral	Amiral de division	Amiral de flottille	Capitaine de vaisseau	Capitaine de frégate	Capitaine de corvette	Lieutenant de vaisseau de 1^{re} classe	Lieutenant de vaisseau	Enseigne de vaisseau	Enseigne de vaisseau de 2^{e} classe
Belgian Navy		Admiral	Vizeadmiral	Divisionsadmiral	Flotillenadmiral	Kapitän zur See	Fregattenkapitän	Korvettenkapitän	Linienschiffsleutnant 1. klasse	Linienschiffsleutnant	Seefahnrich	Seefahnrich 2. klasse

==== Other ranks ====
NATO code	OR-9		OR-8	OR-7	OR-6		OR-5	OR-4		OR-3	OR-2	OR-1
Belgian Navy
Belgian Navy	Oppermeester-chef	Oppermeester	Eerste meesterchef	Eerste meester	Meester-chef	Meester	Tweede meester	Eerste kwartiermeester-chef	Kwartiermeester-chef	Kwartiermeester	Eerste matroos	Matroos
Belgian Navy	Maître principal-chef	Maître-principal	Premier-maître chef	Premier maître	Maître-chef	Maître	Second-maître	Premier quartier-maître-chef	Quartier-maître-chef	Quartier maître	Premier matelot	Matelot
Belgian Navy	Chefhauptmeister	Hauptmeister	Erster chefmeister	Erster meister	Meister-chef	Meister	Zweiter meister	Erster oberquartiermeister	Oberquartiermeister	Quartiermeister	Erster matrose	Matrose

== Fleet of ships ==
=== Active fleet of ships ===
Class	In service	Origin	Picture	Type	Builder	Ship	No.	Comm.	Displacement	Notes
Frigates (2)
Karel Doorman class M class	2	Netherlands		ASW frigates	Schelde Naval Shipbuilding	Leopold I	F930	29 Mar 2007 (in Belgian service); 31 May 1991 (in Netherlands service)	3,300 tonnes	Second-hand purchase from the Royal Netherlands Navy, replaced 2 remaining Wielingen class. Modernised in 2012–15. To be replaced with 3 Future Surface Combatant frigates around 2030.
Karel Doorman class M class	2	Netherlands		ASW frigates	Schelde Naval Shipbuilding	Louise-Marie	F931	8 Apr 2008 (in Belgian service); 28 Nov 1991 (in Netherlands service)	3,300 tonnes	Second-hand purchase from the Royal Netherlands Navy, replaced 2 remaining Wielingen class. Modernised in 2012–15. To be replaced with 3 Future Surface Combatant frigates around 2030.
Patrol vessels (2)
Castor class	2	France		Coastal patrol vessel	SOCARENAM; Sociéte Calaisienne de Réparation Navale et Mécanique	Castor	P901	10 Jul 2014	455 tonnes	A third one has been ordered in 2024.
Castor class	2	France		Coastal patrol vessel	SOCARENAM; Sociéte Calaisienne de Réparation Navale et Mécanique	Pollux	P902	6 May 2015	455 tonnes	A third one has been ordered in 2024.
Mine warfare ships (5)
Tripartite class	3	Belgium; Netherlands; France		Minehunters	Mercantile-Belyard Shipyard	Crocus	M917	3 Sep 1986	536 tonnes	6 City-class mine countermeasures vessel to replace this class from 2025. In September 2025 Belgium announced that it will donate its four remaining Tripartite-class minehunters to Bulgarian Navy (Bellis, Crocus, Lobelia, and Primula).
Tripartite class	3	Belgium; Netherlands; France		Minehunters	Mercantile-Belyard Shipyard	Lobelia	M921	3 Feb 1988	536 tonnes	6 City-class mine countermeasures vessel to replace this class from 2025. In September 2025 Belgium announced that it will donate its four remaining Tripartite-class minehunters to Bulgarian Navy (Bellis, Crocus, Lobelia, and Primula).
Tripartite class	3	Belgium; Netherlands; France		Minehunters	Mercantile-Belyard Shipyard	Primula	M924	20 Dec 1990	536 tonnes	6 City-class mine countermeasures vessel to replace this class from 2025. In September 2025 Belgium announced that it will donate its four remaining Tripartite-class minehunters to Bulgarian Navy (Bellis, Crocus, Lobelia, and Primula).
City class	2	France; Belgium		MCM "Mine Countermeasures Vessel"	Piriou Concarneau(hull); Naval Group; ECA Group	Oostende	M940	3 Nov 2025	2,800 tonnes	Successor of the Tripartite class in collaboration with the Royal Netherlands Navy announced in March 2019.
City class	2	France; Belgium		MCM "Mine Countermeasures Vessel"	Piriou Concarneau(hull); Naval Group; ECA Group	Tournai	M941	25 Sep 2026	2,800 tonnes	Successor of the Tripartite class in collaboration with the Royal Netherlands Navy announced in March 2019.
Auxiliary ships (1)
	1	Spain		Hydrographic research vessel	Freire Shipyard	Belgica II (ship)		25 June 2022	1,200 tonnes	Successor of the Belgica.

Note: 1 Tripartite class ship donated to the Ukrainian Navy in June 2025. The Narcis underwent full maintenance before being donated. Belgium provided basic training and the Netherlands offered on-the-job training for the crews.

=== Ships on order and future ships ===
Class	On order	Origin	Picture	Type	Builder	Ship	No.	Planned comm.	Status	Displacement / length	Notes
Frigates (2)
ASWF class "Anti-Submarine Warfare Frigate"	2 (+1 planned to be ordered)	Netherlands	Artist impression	Anti-submarine frigate	Damen Schelde Naval Shipbuilding	–	–	2030	Under contract	6,400 tonnes	The Belgian Armed Forces and Royal Netherlands Navy will replace their M-class frigates with the Future Surface Combatant. The new Belgian government announced its intention to order an additional third frigate.
ASWF class "Anti-Submarine Warfare Frigate"	2 (+1 planned to be ordered)	Netherlands	Artist impression	Anti-submarine frigate	Damen Schelde Naval Shipbuilding	–	–	2031	Under contract	6,400 tonnes	The Belgian Armed Forces and Royal Netherlands Navy will replace their M-class frigates with the Future Surface Combatant. The new Belgian government announced its intention to order an additional third frigate.
Mine countermeasures vessels (4)
City class	4	France; Belgium		MCM "Mine Countermeasures Vessel"	Piriou Concarneau(hull); Naval Group; ECA Group	Brugge	M942	Dec 2026	Fitting out	2,800 tonnes	Successor of the Tripartite class in collaboration with the Royal Netherlands Navy announced in March 2019.
City class	4	France; Belgium		MCM "Mine Countermeasures Vessel"	Piriou Concarneau(hull); Naval Group; ECA Group	Liège	M943	Dec 2027	Construction	2,800 tonnes	Successor of the Tripartite class in collaboration with the Royal Netherlands Navy announced in March 2019.
City class	4	France; Belgium		MCM "Mine Countermeasures Vessel"	Piriou Concarneau(hull); Naval Group; ECA Group	Antwerpen	M944	Dec 2028	Under contract	2,800 tonnes	Successor of the Tripartite class in collaboration with the Royal Netherlands Navy announced in March 2019.
City class	4	France; Belgium		MCM "Mine Countermeasures Vessel"	Piriou Concarneau(hull); Naval Group; ECA Group	Rochefort	M945	Dec 2029	Under contract	2,800 tonnes	Successor of the Tripartite class in collaboration with the Royal Netherlands Navy announced in March 2019.
Patrol vessels (1)
Castor class	1	France		Coastal patrol vessel	SOCARENAM; Sociéte Calaisienne de Réparation Navale et Mécanique	Vega	P903	Delivery first half of 2027	Under contract	455 tonnes	In 2023 Belgium decided to get a third patrol ship to patrol the Belgian sector of the North Sea.

== Aircraft ==
Aircraft operated by 40th Heli Squadron, from the Belgian Air Force.

=== Current fleet ===
Model	Quantity	Origin	Picture	Type	Role	Notes
NH90 NFH	4	France; Germany; Italy; Netherlands; Spain		Medium helicopter	Utility and search and rescue	2013 the first NH90 helicopter was delivered and introduced into service replacing the Westland Sea King and Alouette III from 2014 onwards. The 4 helicopters will be transformed for the ASW mission. It was planned as part of the STAR plan. It was confirmed in December 2025.
UMS Skeldar V-200	2 (+8 on order)	Sweden; Switzerland		Unmanned rotorcraft	Naval surveillance and mine countermeasure drone	First flight performed in 2026. 1 will equip each ship of the City class.

=== Future aircraft ===
Model	On order	Type	Role	Notes
TBD	4	Helicopter	Search and rescue	Four new helicopters will succeed the NH90 NFH in the SAR role from 2026-2027. The purchase was planned as part of the STAR plan, and was confirmed in December 2025.

== Past fleet list ==
Belgian Navy ships since 1945:

- Tacoma-class frigate
  - F910 Victor Billet, Tacoma-class frigate (decommissioned 1959, scrapped 1959)
- Wielingen-class frigate
  - F910 Wielingen, Wielingen-class frigate (decommissioned in the summer of 2007 and sold to Bulgaria)
  - F911 Westdiep, Wielingen-class frigate (decommissioned on 5 October 2007 and sold to Bulgaria)
  - F912 Wandelaar, Wielingen-class frigate (decommissioned 2004 and sold to Bulgaria in 2005)
  - F913 Westhinder, Wielingen-class frigate (decommissioned 1993, scrapped 2000)
- Tripartite-class minehunter
  - M915 Aster, Tripartite minehunter (sold to Pakistan 2018)
  - M918 Dianthus, Tripartite minehunter (sold to France 1997)
  - M919 Fuchsia, Tripartite minehunter (sold to France 1997)
  - M920 Iris, Tripartite minehunter (sold to France 1997)
  - M922 Myosotis, Tripartite minehunter (sold to Bulgaria 2007)
  - M923 Narcis, Tripartite minehunter (donated to Ukraine 2025)
- Algerine-class minesweeper
  - M900 Adrien de Gerlache (ex HMS Liberty, acquired 1949 – decommissioned 1969)
  - M901 Georges Lecointe (i) (ex HMS Cadmus, acquired 1950 – decommissioned 1959)
  - M901 Georges Lecointe (ii) (ex HMCS Wallaceburg, acquired 1959 – decommissioned 1969)
  - M902 Van Haverbeke (i) (ex HMS Ready – acquired 1951 – decommissioned 1960)
  - M903 Dufour (i) (ex HMS Fancy – acquired 1951 – decommissioned 1959)
  - F903 Dufour (ii) (ex HMCS Winnipeg – acquired 1959 – decommissioned 1966)
  - M904 De Brouwer (i) (ex HMS Spanker – acquired 1953 – decommissioned 1966)
  - M905 De Moor (ex HMS Rosario – acquired 1953 – decommissioned 1966)

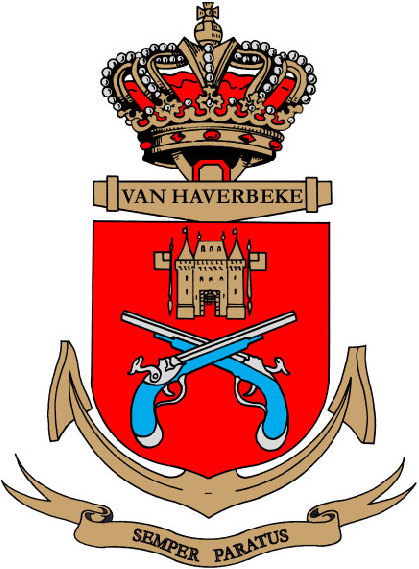
Coat of arms of the M902 Van Haverbeke.

- MSO-class minesweeper (Aggressive class)
  - M902 Van Haverbeke (ii) (ex USN MSO522 – acquired 1960 – decommissioned)
  - M903 Dufour (ex USN AM498 – ex USN MSO522 – ex Norwegian Navy M951 Lagen – acquired 1966 – decommissioned 1985)
  - M904 Debrouwer (ex USN AM499 – ex USN MSO499 – ex Norwegian Navy M952 Namsen – acquired 1966 – decommissioned 1993)
  - M906 Breydel (ex USN AM504, ex USN MSO504, acquired 1956 – decommissioned 1993)
  - M907 Artevelde (ex USN AM503, ex USN MSO503, acquired 1955 – decommissioned 1985)
  - M908 Truffaut (ex USN AM515, ex USN MSO515, acquired 1956 – decommissioned 1993)
  - M909 Bovesse (ex USN AM516, ex USN MSO516, acquired 1957 – decommissioned 1993)
  - Pico (ex USN AM497 – ex USN MSO497 – ex Portuguese Navy M418 Pico – acquired 1974 for spares, subsequently stripped and abandoned, never commissioned)
- MSC-class coastal minesweeper (including 26 Adjutant-class minesweepers provided through US MDAP)
  - M910 Diest (sold to Taiwan 1969)
  - M911 Eeklo (sold to Taiwan 1969)
  - M912 Lier (sold to Taiwan 1969)
  - M913 Maaseik (sold to Taiwan 1969)
  - M914 Roeselare (sold to Norway 1966)
  - M915 Arlon (sold to Norway 1966)
  - M916 Bastogne (sold to Norway 1966)
  - M917 Charleroi (sold to Taiwan 1969)
  - M918 Sint-Niklaas (sold to Taiwan 1969)
  - M919 Sint-Truiden (sold to Greece 1969)
  - M920 Diksmuide (sold to Taiwan 1969)
  - M921 Herve (sold to Greece 1969)
  - M922 Malmedy (sold to Greece 1969)
  - M923 Blankenberge (sold to Greece 1969)
  - M924 Laroche (sold to Greece 1969)
  - M925 De Panne (retired from service 1969)
  - M926 Mechelen (converted to research ship – decommissioned)
  - M927 Spa (converted to munition transport and renumbered A963 – decommissioned and sold to a Dutch foundation, re-commissioned as museum ship AMS60 Bernisse)
  - M928 Stavelot (decommissioned 1987)
  - M929 Heist (decommissioned 1992)
  - M930 Rochefort (decommissioned 1992)
  - M931 Knokke (decommissioned 1976)
  - M932 Nieuwpoort (decommissioned 1991)
  - M933 Koksijde (decommissioned 1991)
  - M934 Verviers (ex USN MSC259 – converted to minehunter 1972 – decommissioned 1988)
  - M935 Veurne (ex USN MSC260 – converted to minehunter 1972 – decommissioned 1987)
- MSI-class inshore minesweepers (similar to the British Ham or Ley classes)
  - M470 Temse (sold to South Korea 1970)
  - M471 Hasselt (decommissioned 1989; transferred to Belgian Sea Cadet Corps in 1993)
  - M472 Kortrijk (decommissioned 1989)
  - M473 Lokeren (decommissioned 1987)
  - M474 Turnhout (decommissioned 1991)
  - M475 Tongeren (decommissioned 1991)
  - M476 Merksem (decommissioned 1992)
  - M477 Oudenaarde (decommissioned 1989; stored on dry land in Antwerp)
  - M478 Herstal (decommissioned 1991)
  - M479 Huy (decommissioned 1990)
  - M480 Seraing (decommissioned 1990)
  - M481 Tournai (sold to South Korea 1970)
  - M482 Visé (decommissioned 1991)
  - M483 Ougrée (decommissioned 1992; she is in civilian ownership on the River Medway in Chatham, Kent, England (2007))
  - M484 Dinant (decommissioned 1992)
  - M485 Andenne (decommissioned 1991)
- Motorminesweeper 105 class
  - M940 (decommissioned 1954)
  - M941 (decommissioned 1954)
  - M942 (decommissioned 1954)
  - M943 (decommissioned 1954)
  - M944 (decommissioned 1954)
  - M945 (decommissioned 1954)
  - M946 (decommissioned 1954)
  - M947 (decommissioned 1954)
- Miscellaneous combatant vessels
  - Barcock (Bar-class boom defence vessel); ex-Royal Navy HMS Barcock; acquired 1946; returned 1949)
  - Bootsman Jonson (minesweeper; ex-Kriegsmarine V1001; acquired 1944; decommissioned 1949)
  - Bootsman Jonson 2 (minesweeper; ex-Kriegsmarine V1300; acquired 1948; decommissioned 1952)
- Patrol boats
  - P900 Ijzer (decommissioned 1969; fate unknown)
  - P901 Leie (decommissioned 1983; sold privately; acquired by Royal Belgian Sea Cadet Corps in later sale)
  - P902 Dender (sold in 1954 without being commissioned)
  - P902 Liberation (decommissioned 2011; donated to Royal Belgian Sea Cadet Corps in 2012)
  - P903 Meuse (decommissioned 1983; on display at Royal Museum of the Armed Forces and Military History, Brussels)
  - P904 Sambre (decommissioned 1983; donated to Royal Belgian Sea Cadet Corps 1985)
  - P905 Schelde (decommissioned 1983; stored on dry land in Antwerp)
  - P906 Semois (decommissioned 1983; sold privately 1985; sunk during storm in Alicante, Spain 1992)
  - P907 Rupel (decommissioned 1983; sold privately 1985; awaiting overhaul by current owner)
  - P908 Ourthe (decommissioned 1983; sold privately 1985; fate unknown)
- Auxiliary ships
  - A950 Sub-Lieutenant Valcke (tug; built 1951; decommissioned 1980; sold privately)
  - A951 Hommel (harbor tug; built in Germany 1953; decommissioned 1999)
  - A952 Wesp (harbor tug; built in Germany 1953; decommissioned 1984)
  - A952 Bij (harbour tug; built in The Netherlands 1959; decommissioned 1986)
  - A955 Eupen (decommissioned 1966)
  - A956 Krekel (harbour tug; built in Belgium 1961; decommissioned 1986)
  - A957 Kamina (former German U-boat tender Herman von Wissmann; also wore pennant numbers AP907 and AP957; decommissioned 1967)
  - A959 Mier (harbour tug; decommissioned 1984)
  - A960 Godetia (MCM Logistics & Command ship, decommissioned 2021, scrapped 2021)
  - A961 Zinnia (supply ship; decommissioned 1993; scrapped 2007)
  - A962 Mechelen (ex-M926 Mechelen; converted to research ship 1963; decommissioned 1983)
  - A962 Belgica (decommissioned 2021, gifted to Ukraine)
  - A963 Spa (ex-M927 Spa; converted to munitions transport ship 1978; decommissioned and sold 1993)
  - A963 Stern, (ex-Swedish coastguard ship, laid down 1979, in Belgian service 2000, decommissioned 2014) Ready Duty Ship
  - A964 Heist (ex-M929 Heist; converted to auxiliary ship 1978; reconverted to M929 Heist 1985)
  - A983 Quatuor (royal yacht; sold 2013)
  - A996 Albatros (ready duty ship; decommissioned 2014)
  - A999 Barbara, hovercraft (acquired 1995, decommissioned 2009)
  - Avila (royal yacht; on display at Royal Museum of the Armed Forces and Military History, Brussels)
  - Inga 1 (tug; built 1959; abandoned in Belgian Congo 1960)
  - MTL551 (motor transport launch; ex-US Navy MTL551; acquired 1947; sold 1953)
- Inland waterways barges
  - A998 Ekster (munitions transport barge; acquired 1953; decommissioned 1979)
  - FN1 (abandoned in Belgian Congo 1960)
  - FN2 (abandoned in Belgian Congo 1960)
  - FN3 (abandoned in Belgian Congo 1960)
  - FN4 (decommissioned 1982)
  - FN5 (decommissioned 1982)
  - FN6 (decommissioned 1982)

=== Belgian naval aircraft since 1945 ===
Type	Origin	Variants	Period of service	Notes	Aircraft serial
Aérospatiale Alouette III	France	SA.316B Alouette III	1971 - 2021	Three helicopters	M
Sikorsky S-58	United States	HSS-1 Seabat	1962 - 1971	Two helicopters	B

- See Belgian aircraft registration and serials

== See also ==
- Royal Belgian Sea Cadet Corps
