= 40th Heli Squadron (Belgium) =

Belgian military unit

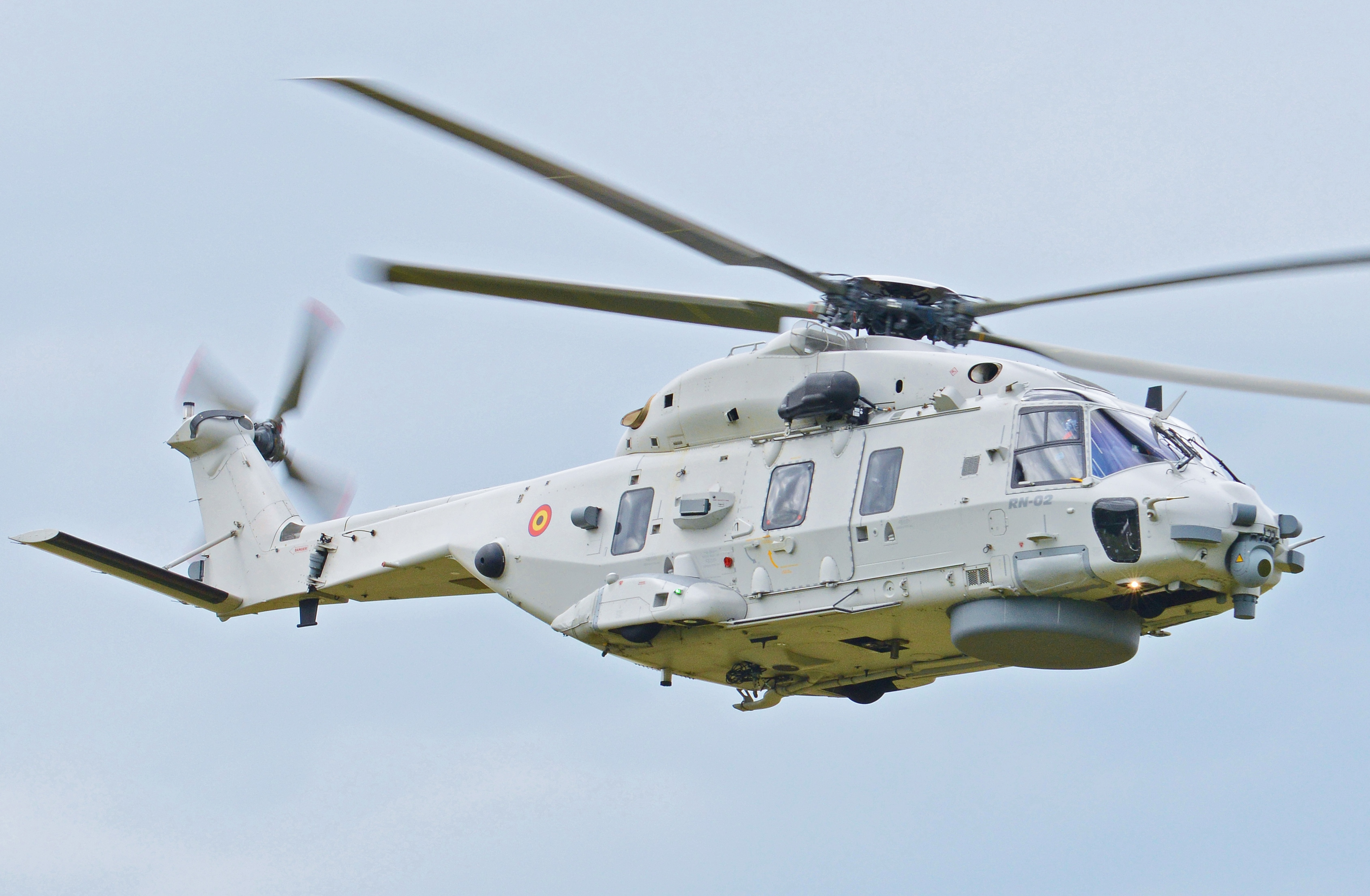
- NH90-NFH of the 40th Squadron Heli
- Country: Belgium
- Branch: Belgian Air Force
- Role: Search and rescue and anti-submarine warfare
- Garrison/HQ: Koksijde Air Base
- Equipment: NH90 NFH

The 40th Heli Squadron (Dutch: 40ste Smaldeel Heli, French: 40 Escadrille Héli) is a helicopter squadron of the Belgian Air Force based at Koksijde Air Base. It is dedicated to search and rescue, anti-submarine warfare and troop transportation operations. It operates four NH90 NFH helicopters. Before the arrival of the NH90 NFH the squadron operated Westland Sea King and Alouette III helicopters on behalf of the Belgian Navy, the Squadron embarks a helicopter on F930 Leopold I and F931 Louise-Marie - Karel Doorman class frigates when sailing on deployment and has also have had helicopter embarked on Dutch frigates as well

== Organisation ==
40th Helicopter Squadron consists of

- HQ staff and Support Flight
- Helicopter Flight
- Maintenance Flight
