= Royal Belgian Sea Cadet Corps =

Belgian non-profit youth organisation

- French: Corps Royal des Cadets de Marine; Dutch: Koninklijk Marine Kadettenkorps; German: Königliche Marine Kadettenkorps
- Founded: 1922; 104 years ago
- Country: Kingdom of Belgium
- Size: 9 divisions and between 350 and 400 members (50-100 officers and about 300 cadets)
- Garrison/HQ: Peutie, Flanders, Belgium
- Motto: (different for each division)
- Colors: navy blue, white
- Website: http://www.cadets-de-marine-kadetten.be/Nederlands/Welkom.htm

The Royal Belgian Sea Cadet Corps (Dutch:Koninklijk Marine Kadettenkorps, French:Corps Royal des Cadets de Marine) is a Belgian non-profit youth organisation whose purpose is to stimulate teamwork and discipline in individuals from the age of 12, while teaching other important skills and values such as first aid, navigation, and linguistic skills, operating a vessel, military drill, and much more. The organization receives support from the Belgian Ministry of Defense.

Cadets are introduced to aspects of the nautical world and the military. The cadets are under the supervision of adult volunteers who usually organize activities, exercises, and training, and are also in charge of the administrative work within the Cadet Corps. Divisions meet every week, usually on Sunday, providing training and educational opportunities for cadets. The organization is nautically based but is both active on water and land.

The Belgian Sea Cadet Corps operates a fleet of about a dozen small vessels, including a sailing yacht and several motor vessels. These are used for training at sea or on lakes and canals. A few times a year, longer cruises are organised either within Belgium or neighbouring countries, such as the United Kingdom and the Netherlands.

No members of the Cadet Corps are required to join the Belgian military, nor is it required for the cadre to have a military background. Many cadets, however, do join the military, law enforcement, or are interested in jobs in the maritime sector. A remarkable number of the cadre are or have had a job in the military, law enforcement, maritime sector, and medical or technical fields.

Although the Cadet Corps in most other countries is, in a way, part of their national military, the Royal Belgian Sea Cadet Corps is not. Despite this fact, the Belgian Defense Ministry frequently allows the Cadet Corps to use its bases, vehicles, and equipment. During some national camps of the Cadet Corps, the Defense Ministry helps in organizing activities that are more military-oriented, such as letting the cadets join in patrolling the Belgian coast with a patrol vessel of the Belgian Navy, physical training and obstacle courses, and ceremonial events such as the annual national military parade in Brussels on July 21.

The Belgian Sea Cadet Corps is also a member of the International Sea Cadet Association and often participates in international exchange programs.

== History ==
After World War I, soon after the creation of the Torpedists and Seafarers Corps, which was an early version of the Belgian Navy, a school was opened for cadets of the Belgian Maritime League. The school was a training unit to prepare the enrolled youth for a career in the Navy or the Merchant Navy. The maritime schools in Antwerp and Ostend continued with training cadets, even after the disbandment of the Torpedists and Seafarers Corps in 1927. The Sea Cadet Corps was later changed into a non-profit organization, which it still is today.

In 1969, the Belgian Navy signed a convention, officially recognising and supporting the Sea Cadet Corps. At that time, Brussels and Liège were the only divisions.

The Sea Cadet Corps was awarded the use of the title "Royal" on its sixtieth anniversary in 1982.

On February 26, 2003, the Belgian Ministry of Defense and the cadet corps signed a new agreement that would improve cooperation and is meant to promote the Navy and the Defense Ministry.

== Organization ==
There are seven divisions across Belgium, with a total membership of a few hundred cadets and cadre.

The nine divisions are located at:-

- Antwerpen (Antwerp)
- Brussel/Bruxelles (Brussels)
- Leopoldsburg
- Ittre
- Leuven
- Oostende (Ostend)
- Geel
- Peutie (national staff)
- Eupen (Sea Cadet Band Corps)

== Fleet ==
The Royal Belgian Sea Cadet Corps owns a fleet of vessels, including:

- V901 Leie (Former patrol boat P901)
- V902 Libération (Former patrol boat P902)
- K104 Sambre (Former patrol boat P904)
- MRB24
- Training Ship T25
- Papillon
- Various small power boats, RHIBs, kayaks, and sailboats

== Training camps ==
Two annual nationwide training camps are organised:

- Camp ORKA: This camp is held annually, usually in August, at the Belgian coast. The cadets stay on an army or naval base near the coastline for about seven to ten days. The activities include sailing, kayaking, marching, medical training, physical training, and marches per squad, squad-based training, and activities involving teamwork, powerboating, and using RHIBs, and much more.
- Camp Leopoldsburg: This camp is held annually, usually during the winter, on the Camp Leopoldsburg Army Base. Until recently, it used to take place in the Belgian Ardennes region and was considered to be the toughest camp of all. Activities include much marching and military drill, navigational and survival training, physical training, bivouac, medical drills, many squad-based teamwork activities, and much more.
- (Camp Mol)This camp is rather new and isn't held annually. This camp is at a lake in the Antwerp province of Belgium. The activities are mostly water-based and recreational. Activities include: kayaking, RHIBs, swimming, and waterborne rescue techniques.

During these camps, cadets will be put in multilingual squads of five to ten cadets, and a Cadet First Class or Quartermaster will be appointed as a squad leader. The squad is given tasks and is supposed to do everything as a team and not as individuals. These squads get their own rooms or tents assigned and have to work and act as one.

During Camp ORKA and especially Camp Leopoldsburg, divisions will try to get the annual division cup, called "the Challenge". This event is normally held during one of the last days and is completely different from the rest of the camp. Divisions will temporarily disband the established squads and will make their own with cadets from their division only. They will then complete a written exam per rank and will march a route, where they will get inspected at random locations, until they reach the base again. The points are tallied up the next day, and the division that wins gets to keep "the Challenge" cup for a year. Some divisions will train their cadets for months in advance in the hopes of winning.

== Ranks and uniform structure ==
All members, except for civilian volunteers, are required to be in uniform while on base or during almost all exercises and activities. Members of the cadet corps hold certain ranks based on multiple factors, as explained below for each group.

There is no specific recruitment time; members are free to join or leave at any time. Cadets pay a small annual membership fee.

=== Cadets ===
Everyone can join from the age of 12 years old. New members will usually start as a Junior or as a Recruit, depending on their age. A member can stay in the group of cadets until the age of 21, where they then are required to leave, become a Civilian Volunteer, or become a Petty Officer.

To rank up in the group of cadets, one must usually pass a written exam and a practical test, and have shown to be of good moral character (meaning that they have not violated the rules and regulations). A period of at least one year must have passed in order to rank up between each rank.

Ranks below "Cadet" are mostly taught practical and theoretical knowledge and are, in normal circumstances, never put in a leading role. From the age of fourteen, cadets are able to take their exam for the rank of "Cadet". A "Cadet" must pledge an oath to be promoted and is required not to violate this oath. Once a "cadet", cadets are given a few more tasks that require learned knowledge. Usually, from the rank of cadet first class or Cadet Second Class, cadets are expected to develop leadership skills and lead small teams of cadets during tasks and exercises. Cadet First Classes, and especially Quartermasters, will often be appointed as a squad leader during national camps and are given more leadership-requiring tasks as they are members 16 years or older and are expected to be more responsible.

The highest rank one can achieve in the group of cadets is "Quartermaster". This rank is almost equivalent to being in the group of Petty Officers due to the responsibility given to the Quartermaster. The rank is also the least prevalent and is only held by a few cadets in the entire country. Quartermasters are also claimed to have the hardest exams, as questions also test the knowledge needed for the previous ranks. They will often be given leadership requiring tasks in order to prepare them for the rank group of Petty Officer.

Cadets wear navy blue uniforms. Their full dress uniform is also mostly navy blue. Their rank insignia are usually red, with the exception of the rank of Junior First Class, which has a blue line. The rank of Junior First Class is also the only rank that doesn't exist in every division. The ranks of Junior, Recruit, and Cadet have no rank insignia. A Cadet receives a white lanyard after taking the oath, which is worn on both the work uniform and the full dress uniform.

==== Ranks ====
Insignia							
Dutch	Kwartiermeester	Kadet Eerste Klas	Kadet Tweede Klas	Kadet	Scheepsgezel	Junior Eerste Klas	Junior
French	Quartier-Maître	Cadet de Première Classe	Cadet de Deuxième Classe	Cadet	Mousse	Junior Premier Classe	Junior
German	Quartiermeister	Kadett Erster Klasse	Kadett Zweiter Klasse	Kadett		Junior Erster Klasse	Junior
Abbreviation	KMT/QMT	1KD/1CD	2KD/2CD	KAD/CAD	SGZ/MSE	1JR	JNR
English	Quartermaster	Cadet First Class	Cadet Second Class	Cadet	Recruit	Junior First Class	Junior

=== Staff ===
All cadet units are staffed by unpaid officers and instructors, although some units may also have volunteer instructors. Recruitment is on a vacancy-only basis.

==== Petty Officers ====
Insignia							
Dutch	Oppermeester Chef	Oppermeester	Eerste Meester Chef	Eerste Meester	Meester	Tweede Meester	Kandidaat Onderofficier
French	Maître Principal Chef	Maître Principal	Premier Maître Chef	Premier Maître	Maître	Deuxième Maître	Candidat Sous-Officier
German		Obermeister		Erster Meister	Meister	Zweiter Meister	Unteroffiziersanwärter
Abbreviation	OMC/MPC	OMR/MRP	1MC	1MR	MTR	2MR	KOO/CSO
English	Chief Master Chief	Master Chief	First Master Chief	First Master	Master	Second Master	Candidate Petty Officer

==== Officers ====
Insignia								
Dutch	Commandant	Groepskapitein	Kapitein	Eerste Luitenant	Tweede Luitenant	Derde Luitenant	Vierde Luitenant	Kandidaat Officier
French	Commandant	Capitaine de Groupe	Capitaine	Premier Lieutenant	Deuxième Lieutenant	Troisième Lieutenant	Quatrième Lieutenant	Candidat Officier
French	Kommandant	Gruppe Kapitän	Kapitän	Erster Leutnant	Zweiter Leutnant	Dritter Leutnant	Vierter Leutnant	Offiziersanwärter
Abbreviation	COM	GKP/CPG	KPT/CPT	1LT	2LT	3LT	4LT	KOF/COF
English	Commander	Group Captain	Captain	First Lieutenant	Second Lieutenant	Third Lieutenant	Fourth Lieutenant	Candidate Officer

== See also ==
=== Other naval cadet organisations ===
- International Sea Cadet Association
- Other Sea Cadet organisations
