= Koksijde Air Base =

Koksijde Air Base (Advanced Landing Ground B-71)
- IATA: none; ICAO: EBFN

Summary
- Airport type: Military/Public
- Operator: Belgian Air Force
- Location: Koksijde
- Elevation AMSL: 11 ft (3.4 m)
- Coordinates: 51°05′25″N 002°39′10″E
- Website: www.mil.be

Map
- Location in Belgium

Runways
Direction	Length		Surface
Direction	m	ft	Surface
11/29	2,670	8,760	Asphalt/Concrete
- Sources: Belgian AIP

Koksijde Air Base (ICAO: EBFN) is a Belgian Air Force facility in Koksijde, 2 km (1 mile) north‑northwest of Veurne, Belgium. The 40th Heli Squadron (Belgium) are based at Koksijde, previously operating Westland Sea King Mk.48 and Aérospatiale Alouette III helicopters until they were replaced with NH90 NFH helicopters starting in March 2012.

It features two airframes as gateguard: a Hawker Hunter F.4, and a Sikorsky S-58C, both ex-Belgian Air Force. Finally, one more Sikorsky S-58C is stored and used for static displays.

This base was featured in the popular TV show "Windkracht 10" and in the movie Windkracht 10: Koksijde Rescue.

Like many Belgian Air bases, both active and non-active, it is available to private recreational aviation during weekends.

During World War II, the base was used by the German Luftwaffe. In 1942, one of their assignments was fighter protection for the German battleships Scharnhorst and Gneisenau and the heavy cruiser Prinz Eugen, when these ships successfully broke out from Brest, in France, through the English Channel to Germany. One of the Luftwaffe pilots based at Koksijde who was involved was Heinz-Wolfgang Schnaufer, who eventually became the highest-scoring night fighter ace in the history of aerial warfare.

== See also ==
- 40th Squadron Heli
