= Bulgarian frigate Drazki =

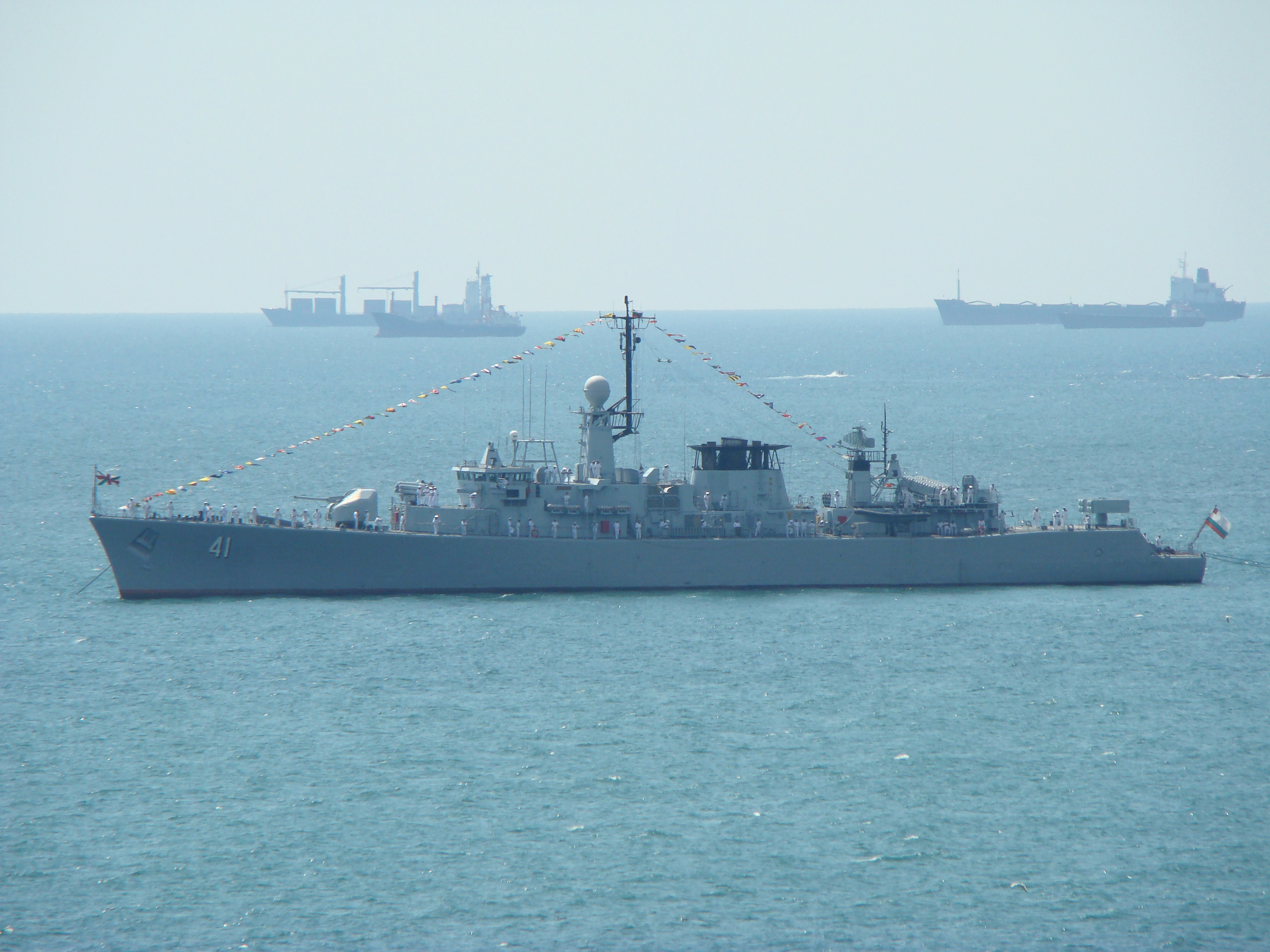
- Drazki in the Black Sea

History

Belgium
- Name: Wandelaar
- Ordered: October 1973
- Builder: Boelwerf, Temse
- Laid down: 28 March 1975
- Launched: 21 June 1977
- Commissioned: 3 October 1978
- Out of service: February 2004
- Home port: Zeebrugge Naval Base
- Fate: Sold to Bulgaria in February 2004

Bulgaria
- Name: Drazki
- Acquired: February 2004
- Identification: 41
- Status: in active service
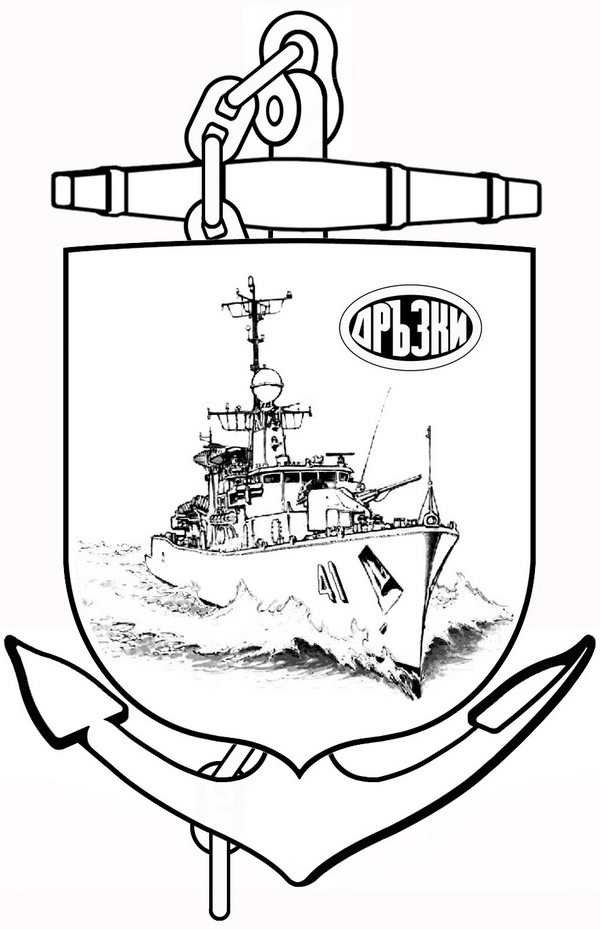
- Badge

General characteristics
- Type: Wielingen-class guided-missile frigate
- Displacement: 2,283 t (2,247 long tons) at full load
- Length: 106.4 m (349 ft 1 in) oa
- Beam: 12.3 m (40 ft 4 in)
- Draught: 5.6 m (18 ft 4 in)
- Propulsion: CODOG; 2 Cockerill CO 240 V12 diesel engines, 4,500 kW (6,000 bhp); 1 Rolls-Royce Olympus TM3B gas turbine, 21,000 kW (28,000 shp)
- Speed: 28 knots (52 km/h; 32 mph)
- Range: 4,500 nmi (8,300 km; 5,200 mi) at 18 kn (33 km/h; 21 mph)
- Complement: 160
- Sensors & processing systems: 1 Hollandse Signaal Apparaten DA-05 surveillance radar; 1 Hollandse Signaal Apparaten WM-25 targeting radar; 2 EOMS IR/Video optical targeting cameras; 1 AN/SQS-510 sonar
- Armament: 1 100 mm Creusot-Loire automatic cannon; 1 RIM-7 Sea Sparrow launcher with 8 missiles; 1 MM38 Exocet launcher with 4 missiles; 1 375 mm Creusot-Loire depth charge launcher; 2 ECAN Type L5 torpedo tubes with 10 torpedoes

Drazki (Bulgarian: Дръзки, lit. 'daring, intrepid') is a Wielingen-class frigate of the Bulgarian Navy. Originally constructed for and operated by the Belgian Naval Component as Wandelaar, the frigate was designed as a platform capable of multiple uses as an escort during the Cold War in the North Sea and English Channel. The vessel uses weapons and sensor technology from NATO counterparts, which was one of the reasons the ship was acquired by the Bulgarian Navy in 2004. The frigate is currently in active service.

== Design and description ==
The Belgian government began studies in 1969 for a new type of escort that would meet the requirements of escort missions in the North Sea and English Channel during the Cold War. The design would also only be limited to weapon systems already in service with or under development by NATO navies. The design also emphasized seaworthiness, automation and watertight integrity. (Note: Moore has the program approved on 23 June 1971 with design studies only commenced in July 1973.) The weapons systems, with the exception of the Sea Sparrow surface-to-air missile (SSM) were French. The radar and tactical data systems were Dutch and the hull and machinery were constructed in Belgium. As part of the project, the Belgian government made Belgian shipbuilding participation mandatory in the construction of the new ships.

The frigates feature an action information centre between decks and the ships could be split into two independent gas-tight citadels in the case of nuclear, biological or chemical warfare. All machinery could be controlled from a central control station. The vessels measured 103.0 metres (337 ft 11 in) long between perpendiculars and 106.4 m (349 ft 1 in) overall with a beam of 12.3 m (40 ft 4 in) and a draught of 5.6 m (18 ft 4 in). (Note: Gardiner, Chumbley & Budzbon have the draught at 5.3 m (17 ft 5 in).) The ships had a light displacement of 1,880 tonnes (1,850 long tons) and 2,283 t (2,247 long tons) at full load. By 2004, the light displacement had increased to 1,940 t (1,910 long tons) and to 2,430 t (2,390 long tons) at full load.

The ships are propelled by a two-shaft combined diesel or gas (CODOG) system. This is composed of a single Rolls-Royce Olympus TM3B gas turbine creating 21,000 kilowatts (28,000 shp) and giving the frigates a maximum speed of 28 knots (52 km/h; 32 mph) or two Cockerill CO 240 V12 diesel engines creating 4,500 kW (6,000 bhp) with a maximum speed of 20 knots (37 km/h; 23 mph) on both diesels or 15 knots (28 km/h; 17 mph) on just one. These turned controllable pitch propellers. The frigates have a range of 4,500 nautical miles (8,300 km; 5,200 mi) at 18 knots (33 km/h; 21 mph). The vessels also had four 500 kW diesel alternators for electric production. They had a complement of 160 including 15 officers in Belgian service.

The Wielingen class were armed with four launchers for MM38 Exocet anti-ship missiles, later converted to two twin launchers. They were equipped with a Mark 29 octuple launcher for eight RIM-7M Sea Sparrow SAMs. These were later upgraded to the RIM-7P model. The frigates also mount a single 100-millimetre (3.9 in)/55 calibre modèle 68 naval gun, one six-barrelled Creusot-Loire 375 mm (14.8 in) anti-submarine warfare (ASW) rocket launcher with Bofors rockets, and two catapults for L5 torpedoes. (Note: "/55 calibre" refers to the length of the gun in terms of calibres, or the bore diameter of the gun.) The class was fitted with two eight-barrelled Corvus chaff launchers, a Sagem Vigy 105 optronic director, a Signaal DA-05 air/surface search radar, a WM-25 surface search radar, SQS-510 hull-mounted sonar, and the SEWACO IV tactical data system with Link 11 capability. They were also given Argos AR 900 intercept electronic support measures and SLQ-25 Dixie torpedo decoy system.

== Construction and career ==
=== In the Belgian Navy ===
The construction programme of four ships was approved by the Belgian government on 23 June 1971 and an order was placed with two Belgian shipyards in October 1973. The vessel was laid down on 28 March 1975 by Boelwerf at Temse, Belgium. Wandelaar was launched on 21 June 1977, named after the Wandelaar sand bank off the coast of Belgium, near Zeebrugge, as the third ship in the Wielingen class. The frigate was later commissioned on 3 October 1978 with the pennant number F912, Wandelaar was based at Zeebrugge.

=== In the Bulgarian Navy ===
Bulgaria joined NATO in 2004 and sought out options to replace their older Soviet-era fleet to fulfill their obligations with the organisation. In May 2004 the Bulgarian government agreed to purchase new equipment for the Bulgarian Navy. On 4 December 2004, a letter of intent was signed by the government and the first ship, Wandelaar was acquired. Approval of the purchase came only on 17 March 2005 and Wandelaar was transferred to Bulgaria in October 2005. The ship was renamed Drazki with the pennant number 41 and underwent refurbishment before entering service. In 2011 Drazki took part in NATO operations against Libya and since then, the vessel of the Wielingen class have participated in several naval exercises with Turkey.

== See also ==
- Bulgarian torpedo boat Drazki, after which the current ship was named
