= Boelwerf =

Shipyard in Temse, Belgium

Coordinates: 51°7′8″N 4°12′7″E

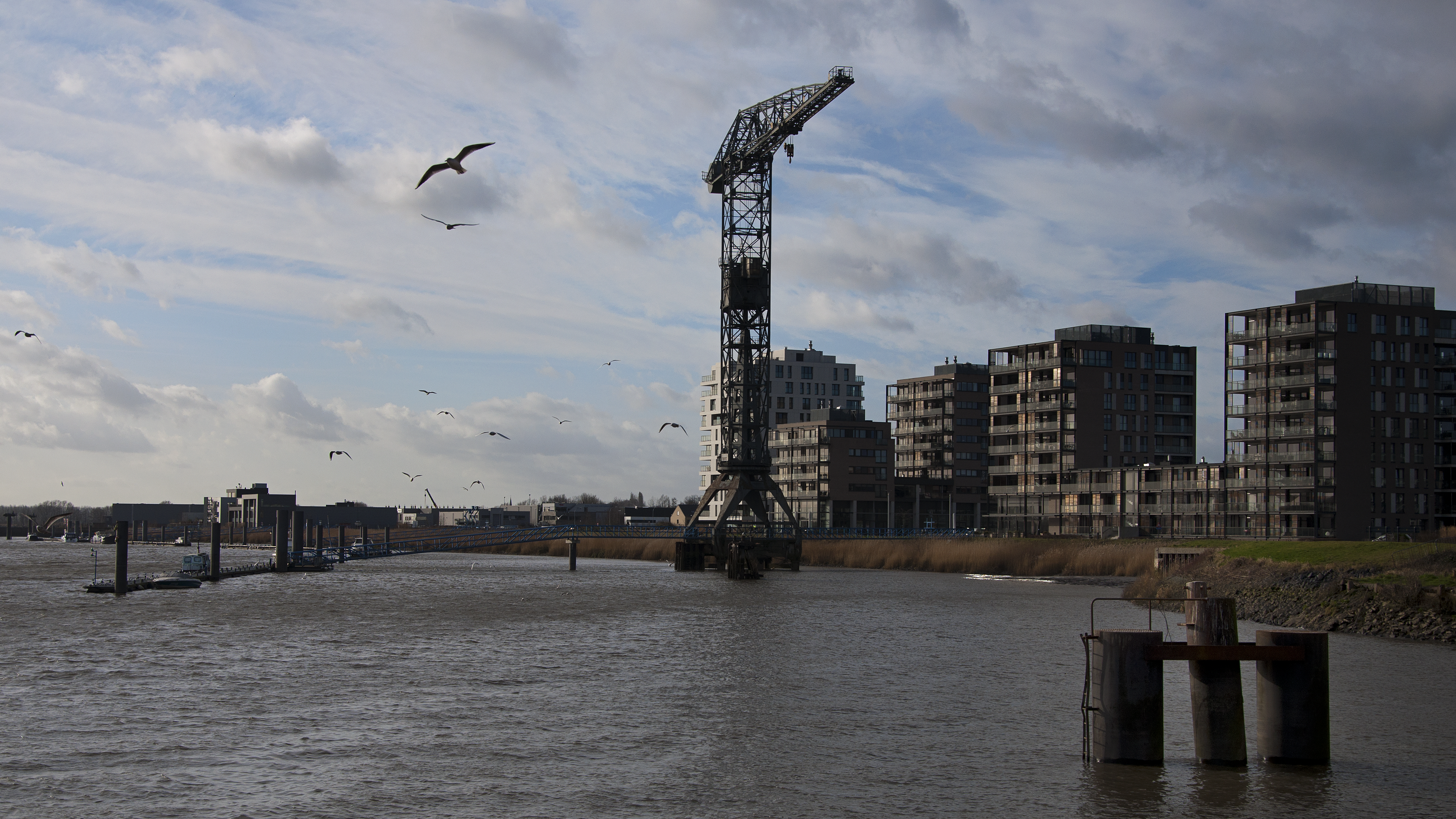
Tower crane, maintained as a last reminder of the Boelwerf

The Boelwerf, initially called J. Boel & Zonen, was a shipyard on the river Scheldt in Temse, Belgium, which produced ships from 1829 until 1994.

== History ==
The Boelwerf was founded in 1829 by Bernard Boel (1798–1872), who had worked as a carpenter at the Antwerpen South shipyards. He was succeeded by his son Jozef Boel. During the first fifty years of its existence, the shipyard built wooden ships and employed a limited number of workers. The company built only one ship a year, mainly tjalks. Starting from 1900, the number of ships built, and with it the number of employees, grew steadily.

After World War II, J. Boel & Zonen flourished after breaking through internationally. At the company's 150th birthday, the Zaat, as the shipyard was known in the local dialect, counted 3,000 employees. A considerable part of them were locals from Temse. The anniversary coincided with the construction of the 57,000 m^{3} (2,000,000 cu ft) LPG carrier Petrogas II, given the symbolic construction number 1500.

During the same period, the Boelwerf's trade union delegation became a model of strijdsyndicalisme ("battle unionism") in Belgium. The leaders of this delegation, Jan Cap (ACV) and Karel Heirbaut (ABVV) often got national attention for their actions.

On 19 December 1980, J. Boel & Zonen underwent a series of demergers. Several holding and shipping companies, such as the Almabo holding and its gas carrier division Exmar, were sliced off, leaving only the actual shipyard, now called Boelwerf. After Cockerill Yards, a shipyard in Hoboken, across the river Scheldt, had gone bankrupt, the Boelwerf acquired Cockerill's shipyard. Following this merger, the company employed 3,500 workers in two large shipyards.

== End ==
Due to the international crisis in ship building, the Boelwerf got into financial straits in the mid-1980s and was declared bankrupt on 28 October 1992. The court-appointed receiver, Christian Van Buggenhout, filed a complaint for fraud, which he withdrew consequently. From the mid-1980s until the beginning of the 1990s, the shipyard had been kept afloat by the government, which had offered large shipping loans to the shipyard's potential clients. After the bankruptcy, most of these loans were either remitted or lost.

After several strikes and a union occupation, the company was restarted in 1993 under the ownership of the Flemish government holding Gimvindus. The company changed its name to Boelwerf Vlaanderen. This company finished the last seven orders and was declared bankrupt on 30 November 1994. Again, the receiver, Jozef Dauwe, had a lot of trouble cleaning up the mess. On 12 October 2004, the Boelwerf Vlaanderen board members were convicted of fraud with European education funds.

== Redevelopment ==
In recent years, the former industrial estate, measuring almost 87 ha (215 acres), has been turned into an extension of Temse's town centre. In 1998, the grounds were bought by the development association Nieuw Temse nv, consisting of construction contractor Cordeel from Temse, earthworks contractor Grondwerken Aertssen from Stabroek, and ING Real Estate. Development plans include an industrial area for SMEs and a 30 ha (80 acre) residential area. When construction will be finished, the area will host about 200 houses and 750 flats. In 2010, the municipal administration was concentrated in Administratief Centrum De Zaat, the former Boelwerf headquarters.

== Famous ships ==
- E. R. Limburgia (1974)
- Prins Philippe (1973)
- MS Isle of Innisfree (former Prins Filip) (1991)

== Notes ==
=== References ===
- (in Dutch) De Zaat residential area.
- (in Dutch) De nieuwe trots van Temse, De Standaard, 30 mei 2009.
- Professional approach to prestigious new project – ‘De Zaat’, Autodesk Buzzsaw.
