= Bulgarian frigate Verni =

Bulgarian frigate

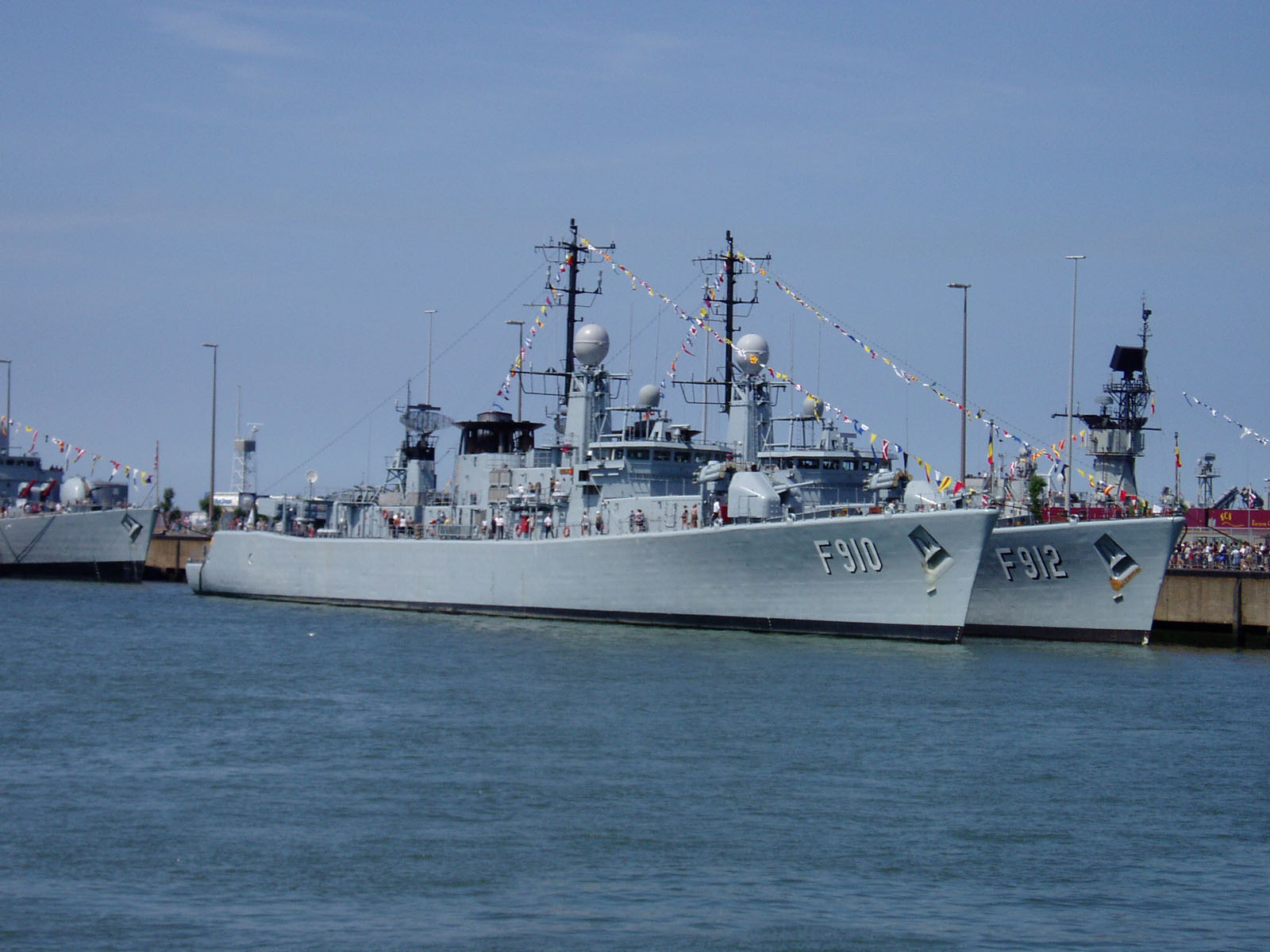

History

Belgium
- Name: Wielingen
- Builder: Boelwerf, Temse
- Laid down: 5 March 1974
- Launched: 30 March 1976
- Christened: 20 January 1978
- Home port: Zeebrugge Naval Base
- Motto: "Fit via Vi"
- Fate: Sold to Bulgaria in February 2009

Bulgaria
- Name: Verni
- Acquired: February 2009
- Status: In service

General characteristics
- Class & type: Wielingen-class frigate
- Displacement: 2,200 tonnes
- Length: 106.38 m (349.0 ft)
- Beam: 12.30 m (40.4 ft)
- Draught: 5.60 m (18.4 ft)
- Propulsion: Combined diesel or gas turbine; 2 × ABC type DZC diesel engines providing 4,200 hp (3,100 kW) each; 1 × Rolls-Royce Olympus T M - 3 B gasturbine providing 27.575 hp; 2 inverted screws with variable pitch
- Speed: 28 knots (52 km/h)
- Range: 6,000 mi (9,700 km) at 16 knots (30 km/h)
- Complement: 14 officers, 71 NCOs and 74 sailors
- Armament: 1 100 mm Creusot-Loire automatic cannon; 1 RIM-7 Sea Sparrow launcher with 8 missiles; 1 MM-38 Exocet launcher with 4 missiles; 1 375mm Bofors depth charge launcher; 2 Ecan Type L5 torpedo tubes with 10 torpedoes

Verni (Bulgarian: Верни, lit. 'Faithful') is a Wielingen-class frigate of the Bulgarian Navy. She was originally commissioned as Wielingen in the Belgian Navy.

== Construction and career ==
Wielingen was launched on 30 March 1976 at the Boelwerf in Temse, and christened by Queen Fabiola of Belgium, on 20 January 1978. The patronage of the Wielingen was accepted by the city of Malmedy. Wielingen was the first ship in the Wielingen class, and had the pennant number F910.

The ship was sold to the Bulgarian Navy and left the Zeebrugge Naval Base in February 2009 under the Bulgarian flag. She was renamed Verni, with the new pennant number 42.

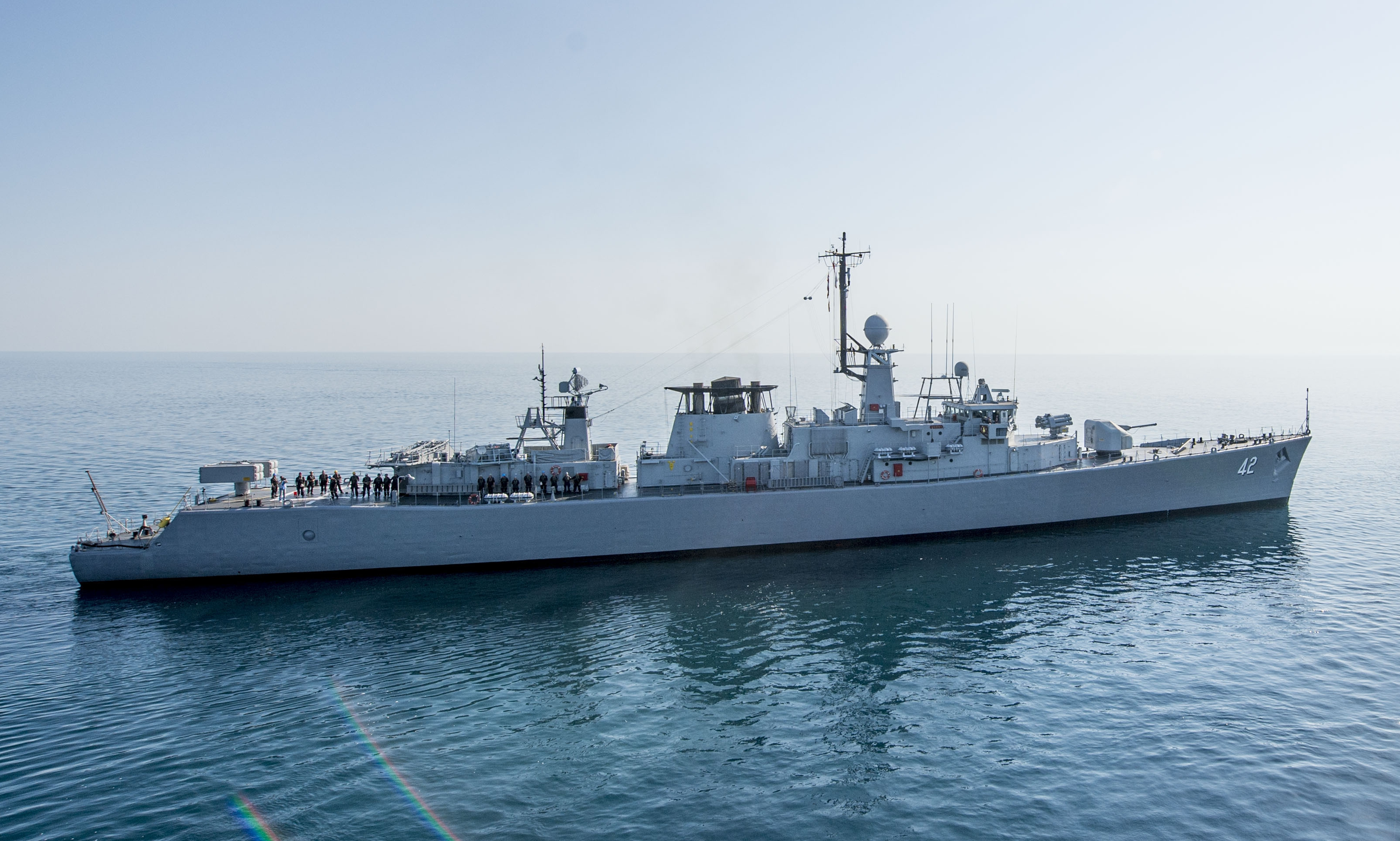
Verni in the Black Sea, 8 July 2015.
