= Hoboken, Antwerp =

Hoboken
- District of Antwerp
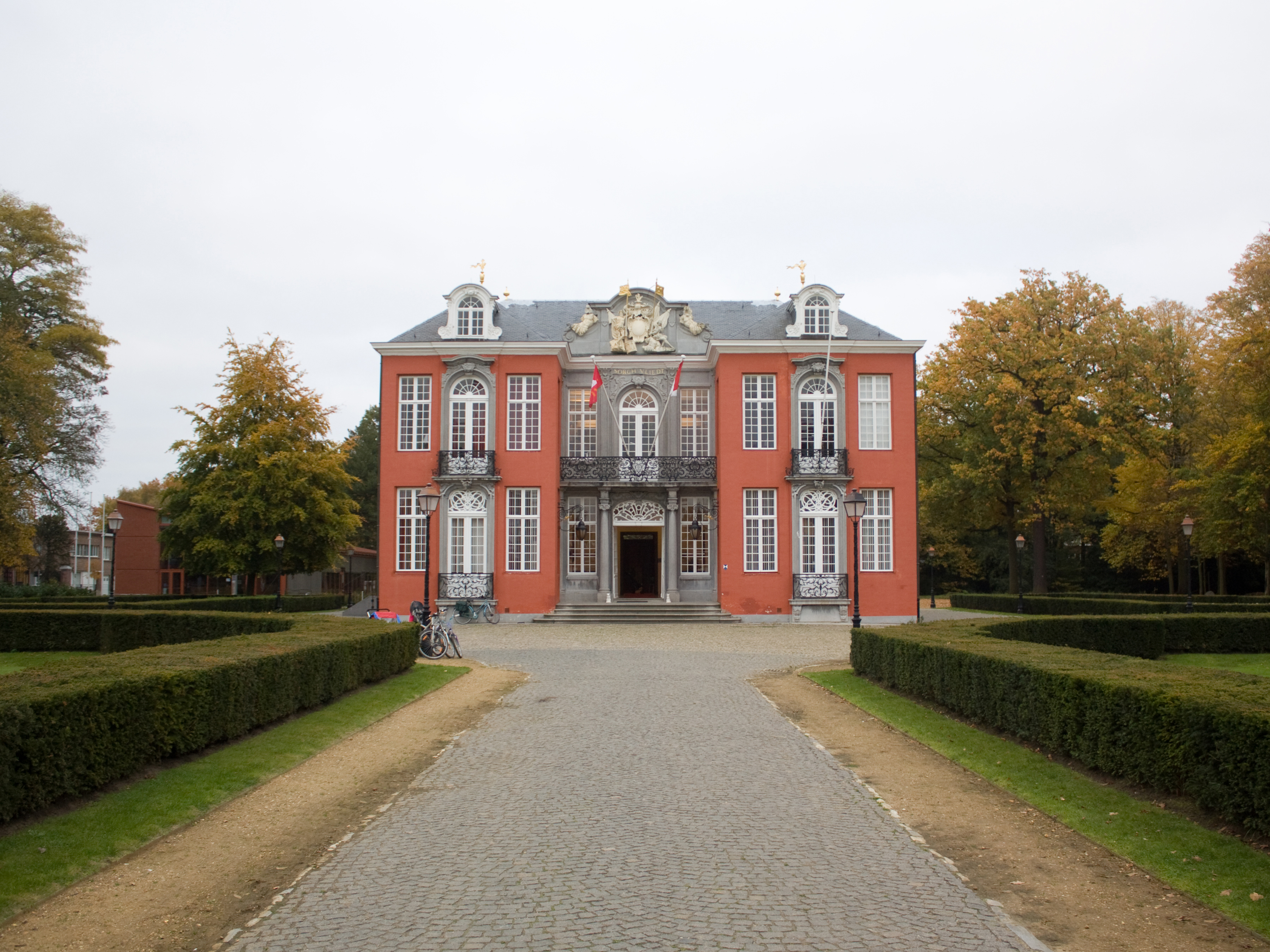
- Sorghvliedt Castle or Kasteel Sorghvliedt

- Flag Coat of arms
- Interactive map of Hoboken
- Location within Belgium Location within Antwerp Province
- Coordinates: 51°10′00″N 4°22′00″E
- Country: Belgium
- Community: Flemish Community
- Region: Flemish Region
- Province: Antwerp
- Arrondissement: Antwerp
- Municipality: Antwerp

Area
  - Total: 10.67 km^{2} (4.12 sq mi)
- Highest elevation: 20 m (66 ft)
- Lowest elevation: 0 m (0 ft)

Population (2025-01-01)
  - Total: 41,853
  - Density: 3,922/km^{2} (10,160/sq mi)
- Postal codes: 2660
- Area codes: 03

Hoboken (Dutch pronunciation: [ˈɦoːboːkə(n)]) is a southern district of the arrondissement and city of Antwerp, in the Flemish Region of Belgium. It is located at the Scheldt river. The name of the district has its origins in Middle Dutch.

It was a separate municipality until 1983. On 1 January 1983, it was absorbed into the municipality of Greater Antwerp whereby Hoboken became one of the 9 districts.

== Name ==
The name Hoboken is derived from Medieval Dutch Hooghe Buechen or Hoge Beuken, meaning High or Tall Beeches. To this day there is a hospital in Hoboken named "Hoge Beuken".

A local children's story says that the name "Hoboken" is derived from a little boy who accidentally dropped his sandwich in the Schelde river, which flows near Hoboken. In the local dialect of Dutch, a "boke" is a sandwich and "ho" is a way of shouting "stop", so he must have shouted "Ho, boken!!!".

== History ==
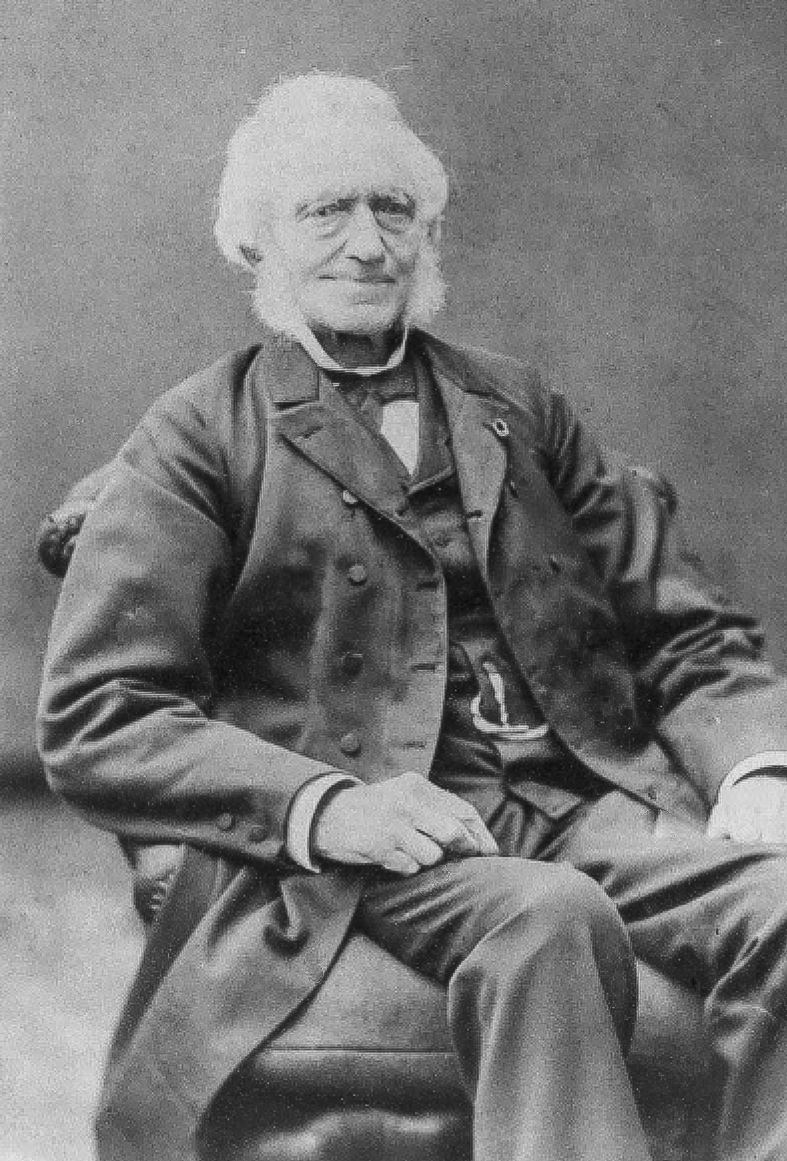
Pierre Joseph Lambrechts was the first burgomaster of Hoboken after Belgian independence. He was the father-in-law of Guillaume Delcourt, the Belgian navigator.

The first historical records of Hoboken date from the 1135 parish of capellam de hobuechen qua libam. At that time Hoboken was part of Wilrijk, in the Duchy of Brabant. It has since then evolved from a small village to an industrialized district of Antwerp.

From the 13th to the 15th century the fiefdom of Hoboken was the property of the Lords of the lands of Rumst: Perwijs, Counts of Vianden, Count of Flanders, House of Luxembourg and House of Orange-Nassau. In 1559, William of Orange sold the lands of Rumst and Hoboken to Melchior Schetz (the new Lord of Hoboken).

In 1579, the city of Antwerp joined the Union of Utrecht and became the capital of the Dutch Revolt. In 1585, Alessandro Farnese, Duke of Parma and Piacenza, captured Antwerp after a long siege. During the siege of Antwerp, Hoboken was partly flooded and was raided by enemy soldiers. As part of the terms of surrender of Antwerp, its Protestant citizens were given four years to settle their affairs before quitting the city. Most settlers went to the Republic of the Seven United Netherlands (the unoccupied part of the Union of Utrecht) in the north, starting the Dutch Golden Age. Antwerp's banking was controlled for a generation by Genoa, and Amsterdam became the new trading centre of the region—the population of Amsterdam went from 30.000 in 1570 to 60.000 in 1600 and the Amsterdam Canal District was constructed to accommodate the traders and bankers from Antwerp (including much of its Jewish population).

Many of the early American settlers were refugees from Antwerp and the Southern Netherlands. The first settlers in New York were Belgians (Flemish Dutch and Walloons), they came to New York in 1623 (Michiel Pauw from Ghent and Peter Minuit from Tournai) and founded settlements at Wallabout, Long Island, Staten Island, Hoboken, and Pavonia. A consul of the "Low Countries" in London Emanuel van Meteren, born in Antwerp, induced Henry Hudson to go meet with the famed cartographer Petrus Plancius (from Ypres) in Amsterdam and to support the search for a northeastern passage to India. Willem Usselincx, the founding father of the Dutch West India Company and the settlement of New Sweden was also a merchant from Antwerp.

In 1617, the descendants of Lord Schetz were called baron and were from then on to be known as the House of Ursel. In 1683, they carried the title of count and in 1717 duke d' Ursel.

A turning point in the history of Hoboken was the construction of the Cockerill shipyard in 1873.

During World War I, Antwerp became the fallback point of the Belgian Army after the defeat at the Battle of Liège. The Siege of Antwerp lasted for 11 days, the city was taken by the German Army after heavy fighting, and the Belgians were forced to retreat westwards. Fort 8, one of the forts defending Antwerp located in the south of Hoboken, was of not much use during WWI, it was built in 1864 and was terribly outdated. Antwerp remained under German control until the Armistice of 11 November 1918.

On 1 January 1983, Hoboken became a district of the city of Antwerp.

== Culture ==
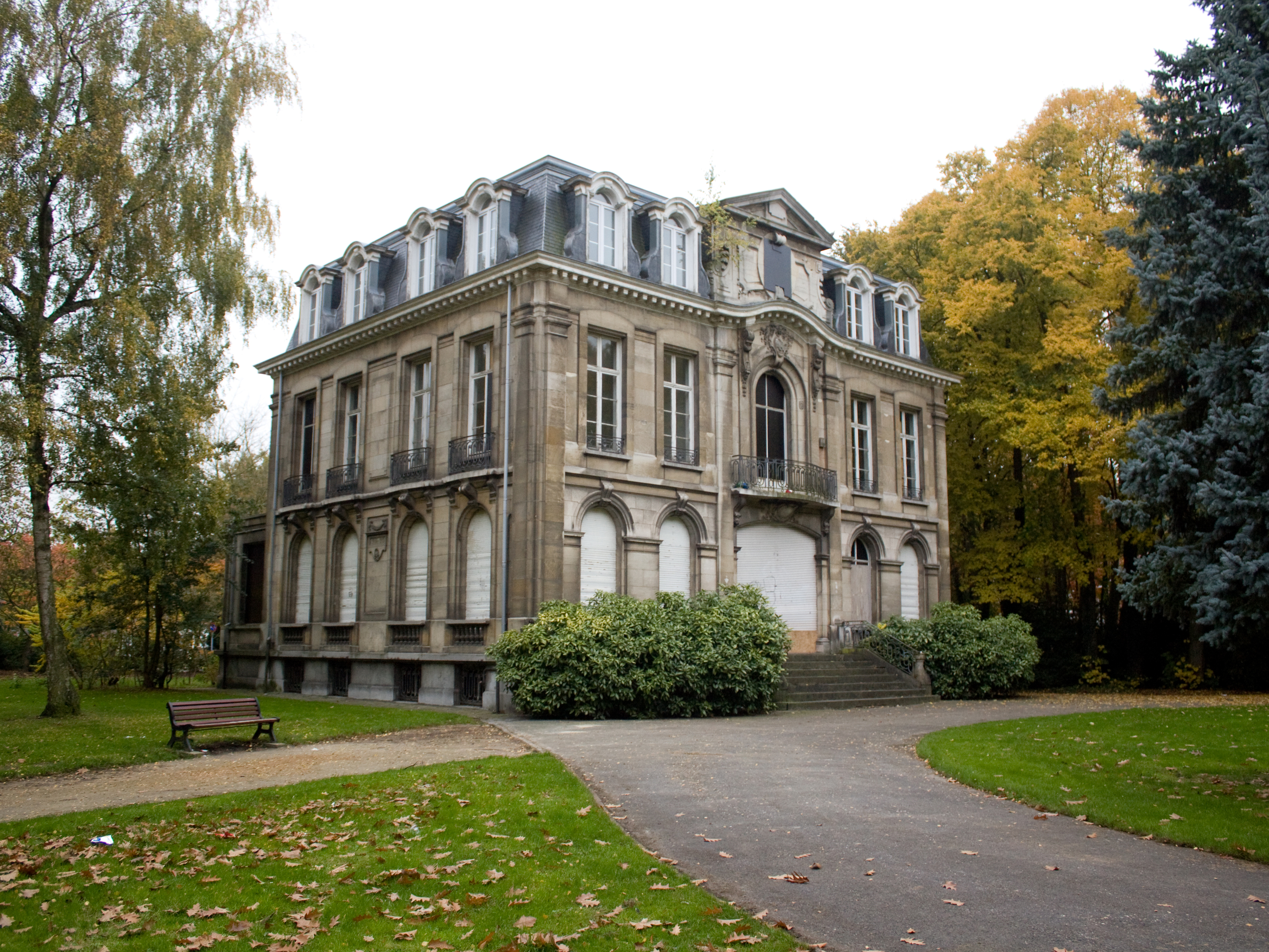
The Meerlenhof, built in 16th century.

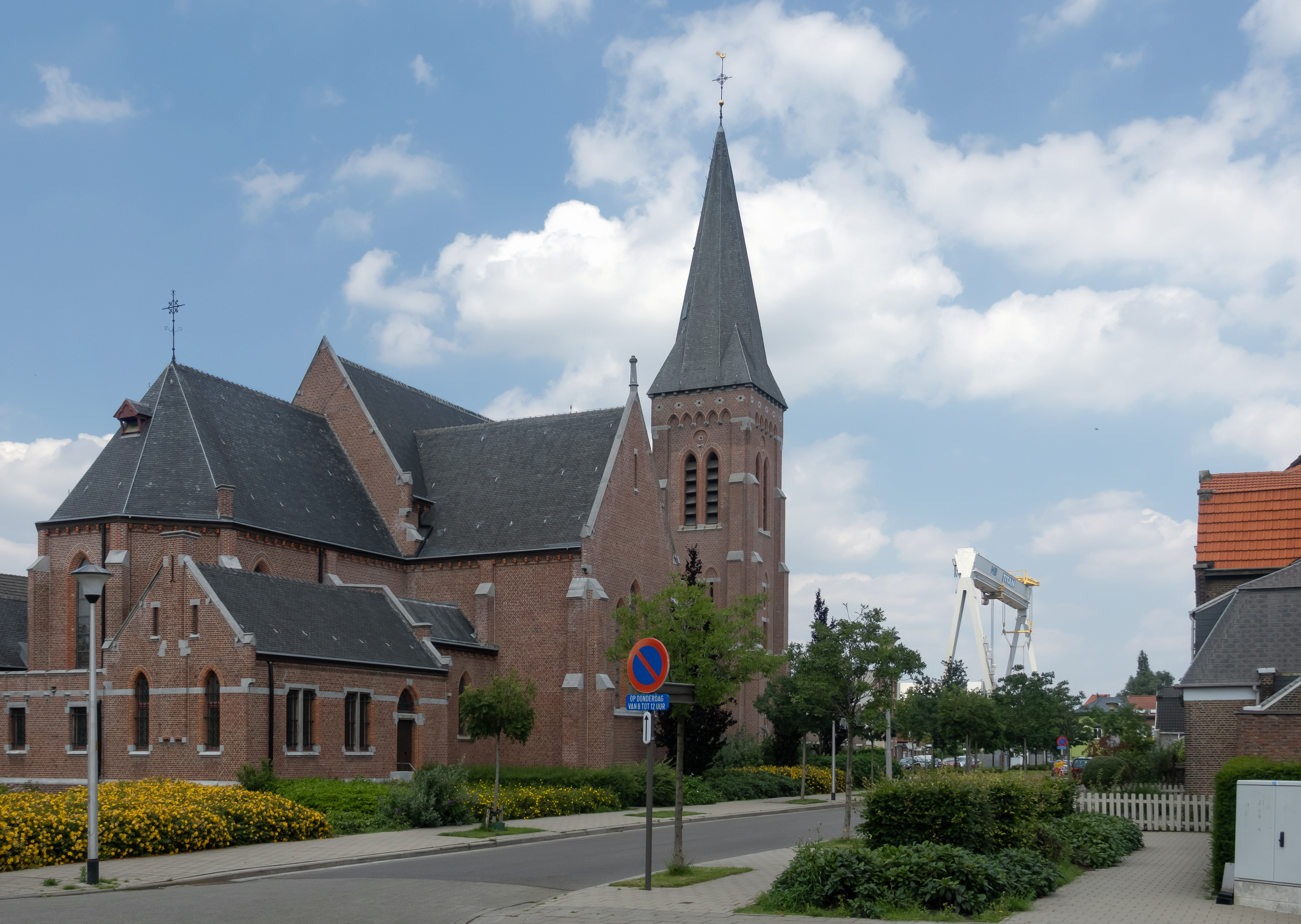
Church: the Sint-Jozefkerk in Hoboken

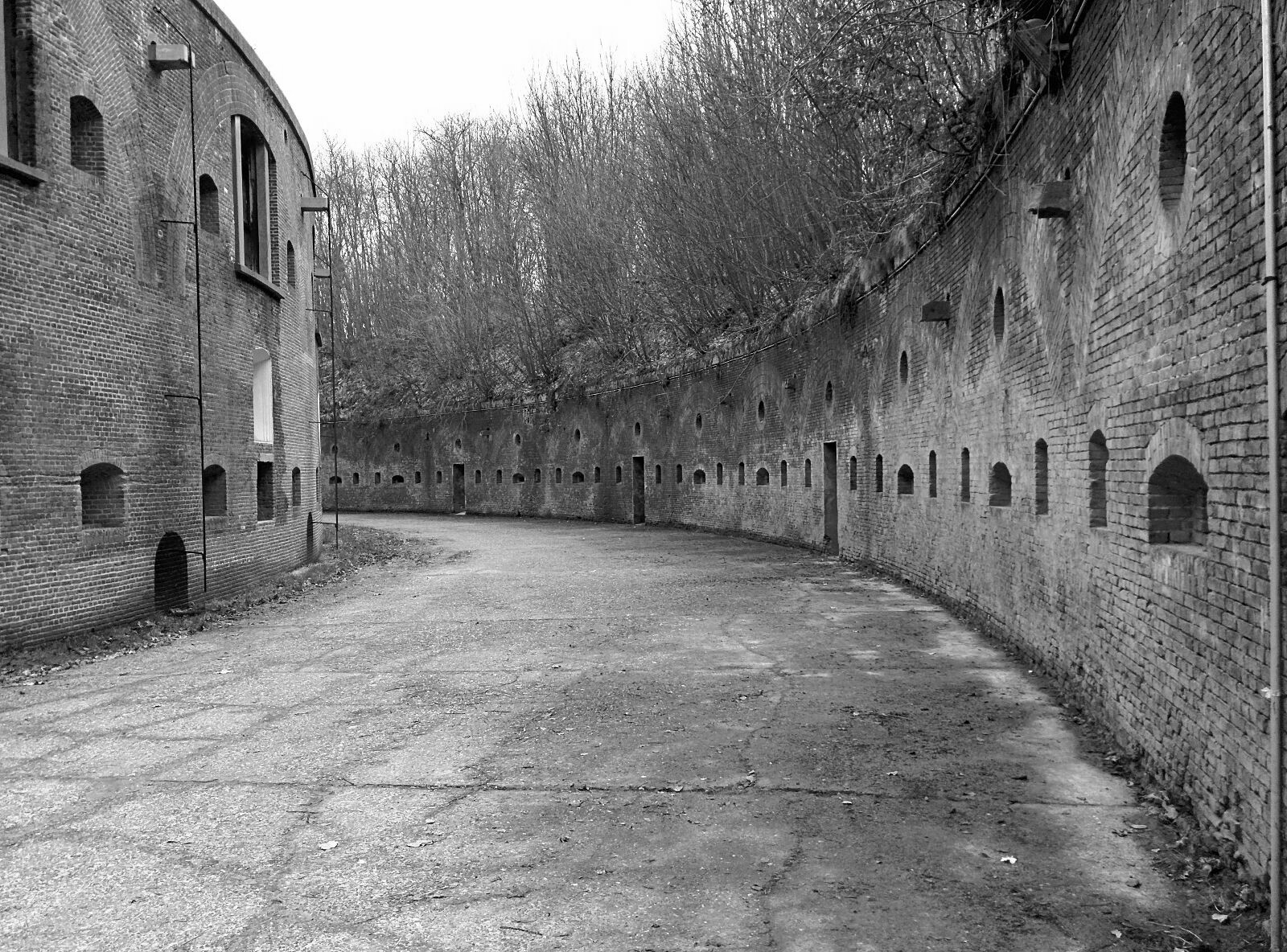
Fort 8 of the defensive structures of Antwerp.

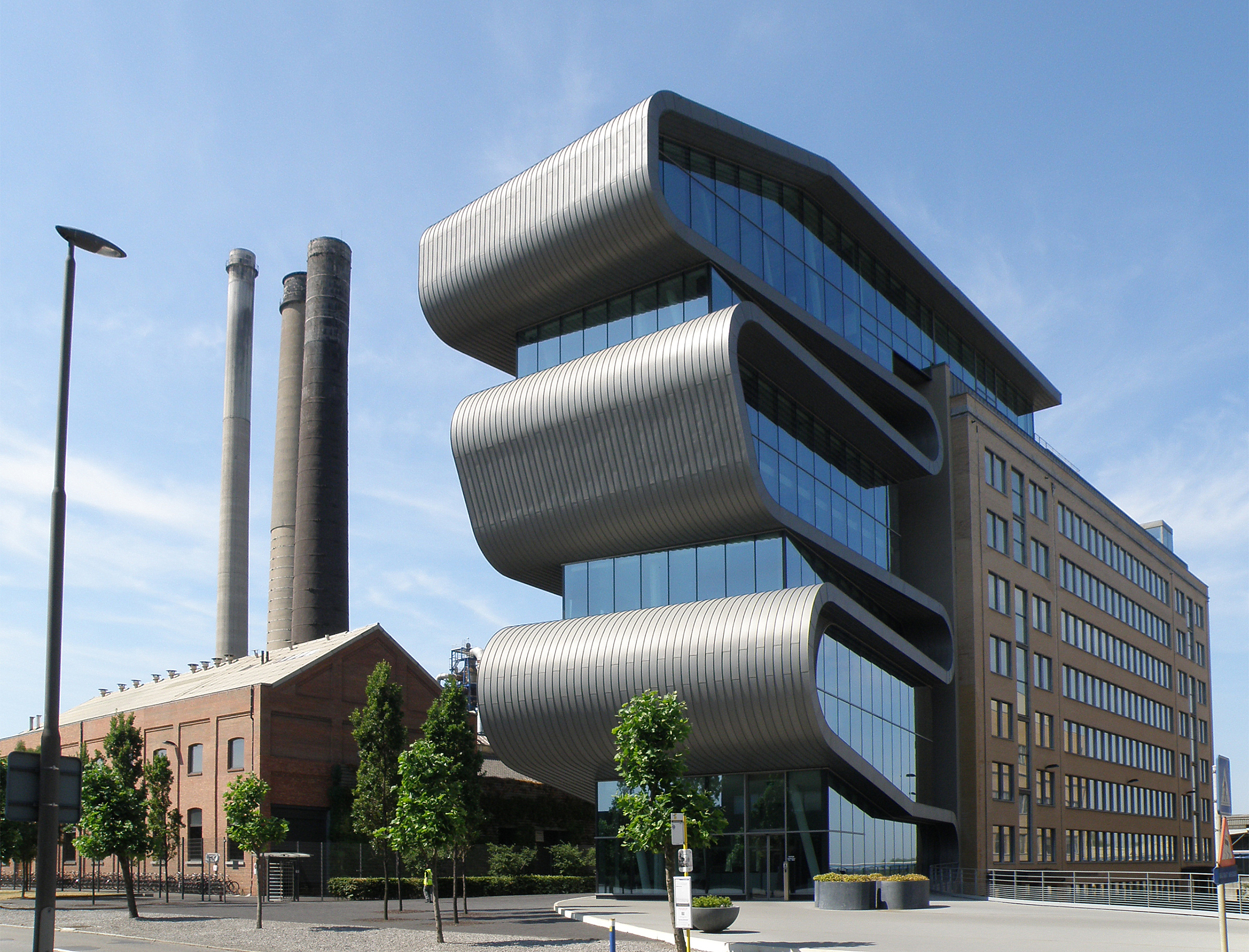
Umicore's precious metals facility in Hoboken.

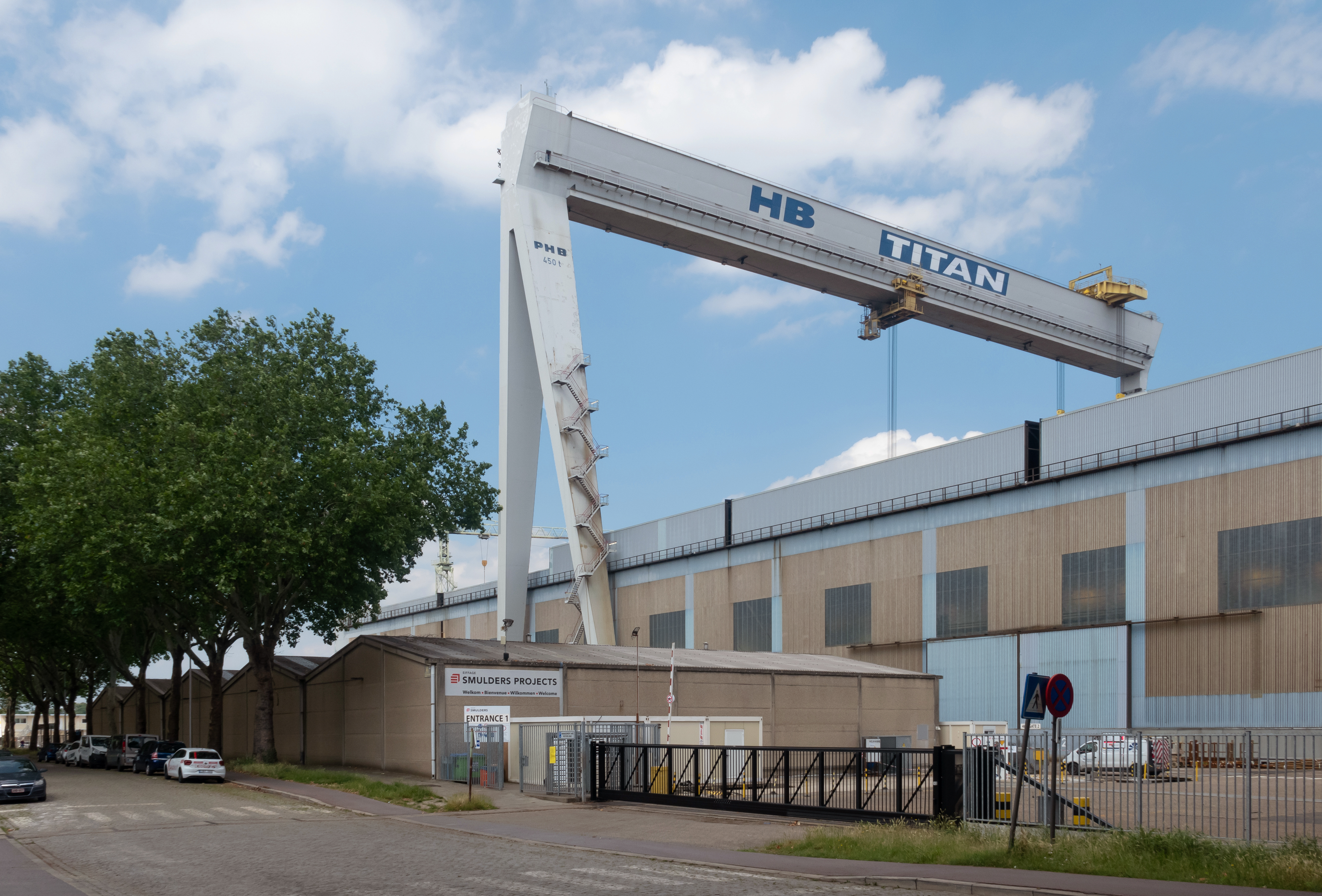
Shipyard Smulders Projects in Hoboken

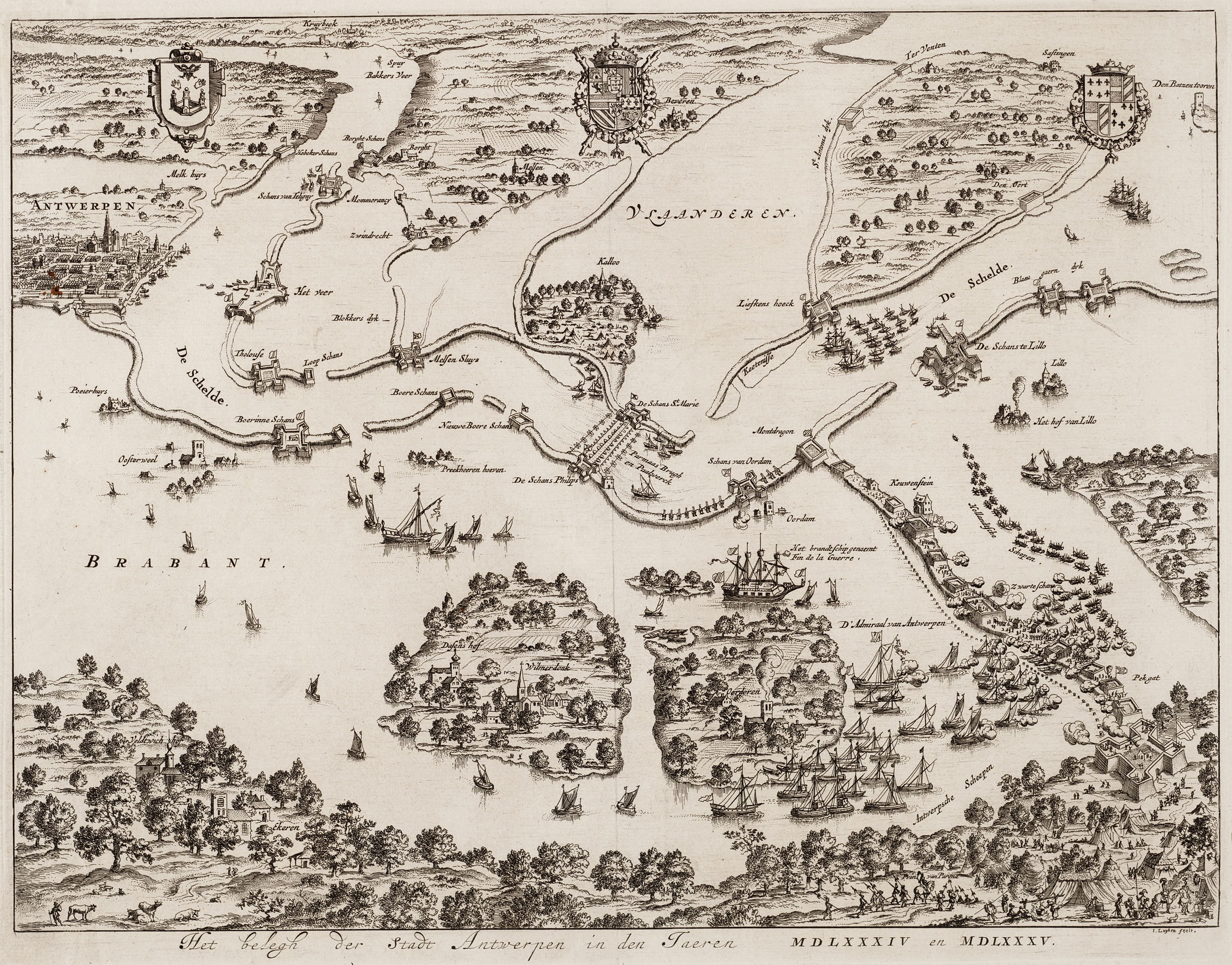
Hoboken during the Fall of Antwerp, c. 1585.

== Geography ==
The main neighbourhoods in Hoboken are:

East of railway line 52

- Hoboken-centre
- Hertog van Brabantwijk
- Vogeltjeswijk
- Zwaantjes

West of railway line 52

- Moretusburg
- Hertogvelden
- Polderstad

== Demographics ==
=== 19th century ===
Year	1806	1816	1830	1846	1856	1866	1876	1880	1890
Population	1550	2065	2298	2633	2631	2680	3410	4147	6987
Notes:census taken on 31/12

=== 20th century ===
Year	1900	1910	1920	1930	1947	1961	1970	1980	1982
Population	10.202	16.882	21.006	32.700	31.725	30.557	33.693	34.640	34.562
Notes:census taken on 31/12 until 1970 + 1 January 1980 + 31 December 1982

=== 21st century ===
Year	2007	2008	2009	2010	2011	2012	2013	2014
Population	34.542	34.862	35.170	35.550	36.244	37.283	37.464	37.945
Notes:census data from 'Antwerpen Buurtmonitor'
