= John Cockerill (company) =

Belgian engineering company

John Cockerill Group
- Trade name: John Cockerill
- Formerly: Cockerill Maintenance & Ingénierie
- Type: Private
- Industry: Engineering
- Predecessor: Part of Cockerill-Sambre
- Founded: 1817
- Headquarters: Seraing, Belgium
- Revenue: 660,000,000 United States dollar (2015)
- Website: johncockerill.com

John Cockerill, formerly Cockerill Maintenance & Ingénierie (CMI), is a mechanical engineering group headquartered in Seraing, Belgium. It produces machinery for steel plants, industrial heat recovery equipment and boilers, as well as shunting locomotives and military equipment.

== History ==
In 1817, an iron foundry was established in Seraing by John Cockerill and his brother, Charles James Cockerill. As well as creating an iron works, John Cockerill also began machine-building activities, following in the footsteps of his father, William Cockerill, who had made his fortune constructing machines for the textile industry in the Liège region. In 1825, the enterprise became known as John Cockerill & Cie.

The company produced the primary industrial machinery of the day – steam engines, blast furnace blowers, etc. In 1835, the company produced the first Belgian steam locomotive, Le Belge, beginning a tradition of building locomotives for the railways of Belgium. An association with military equipment also began early in the 19th century, building a battleship for the United Kingdom of the Netherlands navy in 1825.

By 1981, the firm had become part of the financially troubled Cockerill-Sambre group. In 1982, Cockerill-Mechanique (with a capital of ~2 billion Belgian francs "2 068 376 776,0 euro") became a 100% owned subsidiary of that group as Cockerill Mechanical Industries. The company was one of the more profitable parts of the group, and it was planned to sell the company as part of the dismantling of Cockerill-Sambre, but the plan was not carried out. The company remained a division of Cockerill-Sambre (and its successor Usinor) until 2002, when it was sold to private investors.

In 2004, the company was renamed Cockerill Maintenance & Ingénierie (CMI), then it changed back to its original name John Cockerill in May 2019.

== Activities and products ==
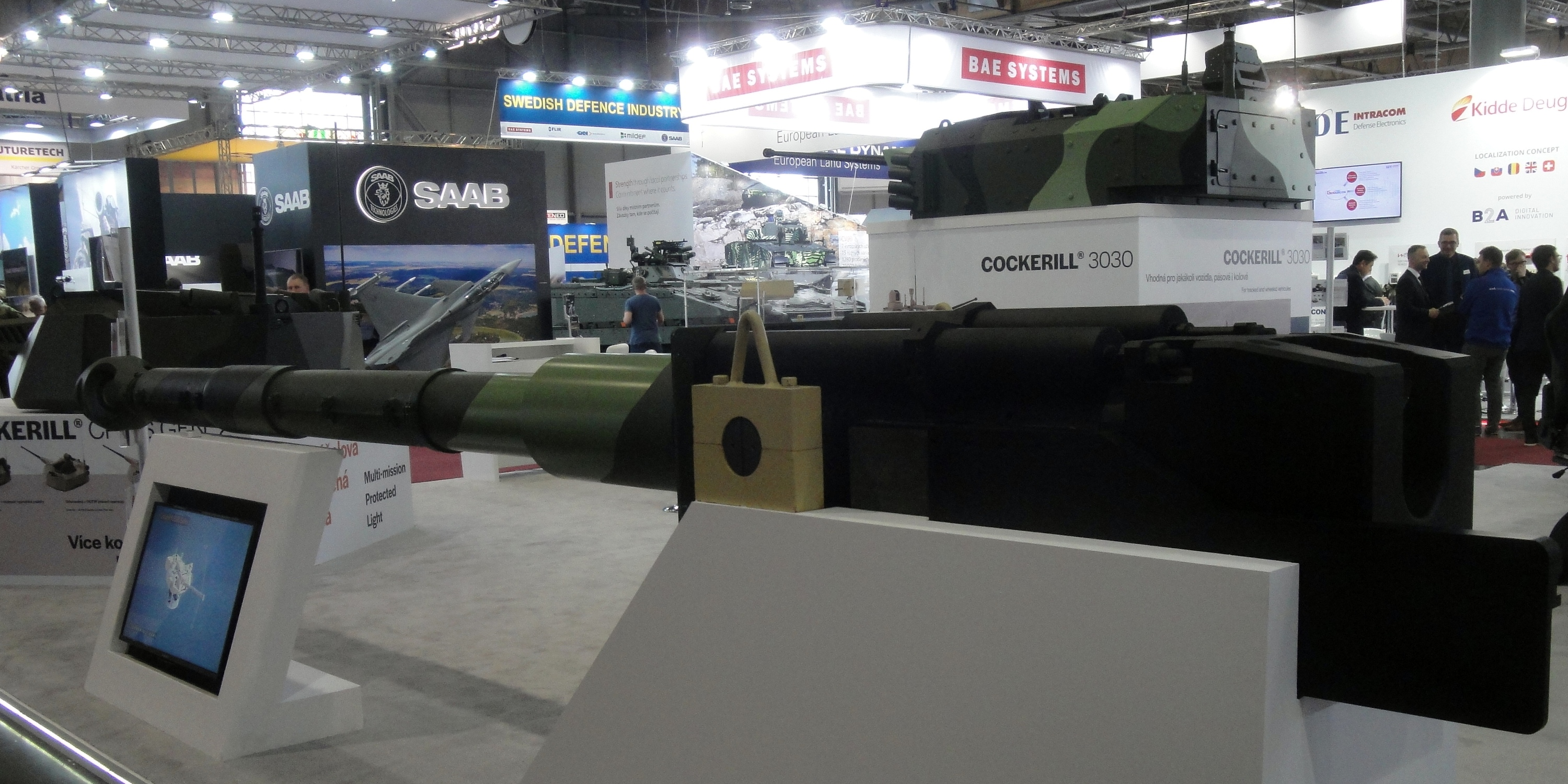
Cockerill 105 HP Gun

The company's primary business is in metal mechanical engineering with emphasis on machinery related to or using in steelworks; maintenance, refurbishment and repair of equipment is also part of the companies business.

The industry sub-division manufactures equipment for steel coil treatment including pickling, annealing, hot dip and electro galvanising lines, rolling mills and reheating furnaces for the steel industry., as well as shunting locomotives.

The energy sub-division products include heat recovery steam generator and boilers. In the late 2000s the company developed high temperature solar receivers for solar power station, with the first installation in 2014 as part of the Khi Solar One power station at Upington, South Africa. John Cockerill sold 33% of the world's hydrogen high-pressure electrolysis in 2021.

The defence sub-division's primary products are 90mm guns and turrets for light armoured vehicles.

== Controversy ==
NGOs raised concerns about the validity of the licenses authorising the company to sell arms to Saudi Arabia, given the involvement of this country in a conflict with Yemen. A consortium of journalists said they found evidence that Saudi Arabia is using some of these weapons in this conflict.
