= List of ship commissionings in 1983 =

The list of ship commissionings in 1983 includes a chronological list of all ships commissioned in 1983.

	Operator	Ship	Flag	Class and type	Pennant	Other notes
22 January	United States Navy	Ticonderoga		Ticonderoga-class cruiser	CG-	
27 January	Royal Netherlands Navy	Abraham Crijnssen		Kortenaer-class frigate	F816	
29 January	Royal Australian Navy	Sydney		Adelaide-class frigate	FFG 03	
29 January	United States Navy	Underwood		Oliver Hazard Perry-class frigate	FFG-36	
19 February	United States Navy	Reid		Oliver Hazard Perry-class frigate	FFG-30	
5 March	United States Navy	Hayler		Spruance-class destroyer	DD-997	
14 April	Royal Netherlands Navy	Jan van Brakel		Kortenaer-class frigate	F825	
21 May	United States Navy	Doyle		Oliver Hazard Perry-class frigate	FFG-39	
21 May	United States Navy	Albuquerque		Los Angeles-class submarine	SSN-706	
28 May	Royal Netherlands Navy	Alkmaar		Alkmaar-class minehunter	M850	First in class
18 June	United States Navy	Crommelin		Oliver Hazard Perry-class frigate	FFG-37	
2 July	United States Navy	Jarrett		Oliver Hazard Perry-class frigate	FFG-33	
17 August	Royal Netherlands Navy	Delfzijl		Alkmaar-class minehunter	M851	
20 August	United States Navy	Klakring		Oliver Hazard Perry-class frigate	FFG-42	
1 October	Royal Netherlands Navy	Pieter Florisz		Kortenaer-class frigate	F826	
1 October	United States Navy	Portsmouth		Los Angeles-class submarine	SSN-707	
8 October	United States Navy	Curts		Oliver Hazard Perry-class frigate	FFG-38	
16 November	Royal Netherlands Navy	Dordrecht		Alkmaar-class minehunter	M852	
19 November	United States Navy	De Wert		Oliver Hazard Perry-class frigate	FFG-45	
10 December	United States Navy	McClusky		Oliver Hazard Perry-class frigate	FFG-41	
