= List of ship decommissionings in 2003 =

The list of ship decommissionings in 2003 includes a chronological list of all ships decommissioned in 2003.

	Operator	Ship	Flag	Class and type	Fate	Other notes
1 January	Royal Netherlands Navy	Harlingen		Alkmaar-class minehunter	Transferred to Latvia	Renamed Imanta (M-04)
1 January	Royal Netherlands Navy	Scheveningen		Alkmaar-class minehunter	Transferred to Latvia	Renamed Viesturs (M-05)
7 January	United States Navy	Kinkaid		Spruance-class destroyer	Sunk as a target in 2004	
28 February	United States Navy	Fife		Spruance-class destroyer	Sunk as a target in 2005	
28 February	United States Navy	Sides		Oliver Hazard Perry-class frigate	Awaiting transfer	Planned transfer to Portugal in 2006
15 March	United States Navy	George Philip		Oliver Hazard Perry-class frigate	Awaiting transfer	Planned transfer to Portugal in 2006
18 March	United States Navy	Arthur W. Radford		Spruance-class destroyer	Reserve	Philadelphia, Pennsylvania with planned disposal as target
27 March	United States Navy	Paul F. Foster		Spruance-class destroyer	SDTS ship	NSWC Port Hueneme
4 April	United States Navy	Estocin		Oliver Hazard Perry-class frigate	Transferred to Turkey	Renamed TCG Göksu (F 497)
2 May	(United States) National Oceanic and Atmospheric Administration	Whiting		Pierce-class survey ship	Transferred to Mexican Navy 2005	Renamed ARM Río Tuxpan (BI-12)
20 June	United States Navy	Oldendorf		Spruance-class destroyer	Reserve	Bremerton, Washington
7 August	United States Navy	Constellation		Kitty Hawk-class aircraft carrier	Storage	Naval Inactive Ship Maintenance Facility in Bremerton, Washington
25 August	United States Navy	Hayler		Spruance-class destroyer	Sunk as a target in 2004	
2 October	United States Navy	Briscoe		Spruance-class destroyer	Sunk as a target in 2005	
22 October	United States Navy	Stump		Spruance-class destroyer	Sunk as a target in 2006	
6 November	United States Navy	Deyo		Spruance-class destroyer	Sunk as a target in 2005	
23 November	Royal Navy	Bridport		Sandown-class minehunter	Sold to Estonia	
2 December	United States Navy	Elliot		Spruance-class destroyer	Sunk as a target in 2005	
12 December	Chilean Navy	Blanco Encalada		County-class destroyer	Scrapped	
