= List of ship commissionings in 1984 =

The list of ship commissionings in 1984 includes a chronological list of all ships commissioned in 1984.

	Operator	Ship	Flag	Class and type	Pennant	Other notes
7 January	United States Navy	Halyburton		Oliver Hazard Perry-class frigate	FFG-40	
12 January	Royal Netherlands Navy	Haarlem		Alkmaar-class minehunter	M853	
10 March	United States Navy	Nicholas		Oliver Hazard Perry-class frigate	FFG-47	
17 March	United States Navy	Thach		Oliver Hazard Perry-class frigate	FFG-43	
12 April	Royal Netherlands Navy	Harlingen		Alkmaar-class minehunter	M 854	
22 June	Chilean Navy	Almirante Cochrane		County-class destroyer	D12	Purchase date from the United Kingdom for ex-HMS Antrim
24 June	United States Navy	Rentz		Oliver Hazard Perry-class frigate	FFG-46	
30 June	United States Navy	Robert G. Bradley		Oliver Hazard Perry-class frigate	FFG-49	
4 July	United States Navy	Yorktown		Ticonderoga-class cruiser	CG-48	
18 July	Royal Netherlands Navy	Scheveningen		Alkmaar-class minehunter	M855	
21 July	Royal Australian Navy	Darwin		Adelaide-class frigate	FFG 04	
September	People's Liberation Army Navy	Changzheng 3		Type 091 submarine	403	date of initial operational capability
17 November	United States Navy	Gary		Oliver Hazard Perry-class frigate	FFG-51	
24 November	United States Navy	Vandegrift		Oliver Hazard Perry-class frigate	FFG-48	
1 December	United States Navy	Taylor		Oliver Hazard Perry-class frigate	FFG-50	
12 December	Royal Netherlands Navy	Maassluis		Alkmaar-class minehunter	M856	
