= List of ship commissionings in 2007 =

The list of ship commissionings in 2007 includes a chronological list of all ships commissioned in 2007.

| | Operator | Ship | Flag | Class and type | Pennant | Other notes |
|---|---|---|---|---|---|---|
| 4 January | Indian Navy | Shardul | | Shardul-class tank landing ship | L16 | First in class |
| 30 January | Royal Navy | Clyde | | River-class patrol vessel | P257 | |
| 10 February | United States Navy | Gridley | | Arleigh Burke-class destroyer | DDG-101 | |
| 16 February | South African Navy | Spioenkop | | Valour-class frigate | F147 | |
| 5 March | United States Navy | New Orleans | | San Antonio-class amphibious transport dock | LPD-18 | |
| 7 March | Latvian Naval Forces | Imanta | | Imanta-class minehunter | M-04 | former HNLMS Harlingen |
| 20 March | South African Navy | Mendi | | Valour-class frigate | F148 | |
| 29 March | Belgian Navy | Leopold I | | Karel Doorman-class frigate | F980 | former HNLMS Karel Doorman |
| 18 April | Chilean Navy | Almirante Riveros | | Karel Doorman-class frigate | FF-18 | former HNLMS Tjerk Hiddes |
| 5 May | United States Navy | Hawaii | | Virginia-class submarine | SSN-776 | commissioned at Naval Submarine Base New London, Groton, CT |
| 31 May | United States Navy | Kidd | | Arleigh Burke-class destroyer | DDG-100 | |
| 12 June | Royal New Zealand Navy | Canterbury | | Multi-role vessel | L421 | |
| 2 July | Indonesian Navy | Diponegoro | | Sigma-class corvette | 365 | |
| 16 July | (United States) National Oceanic and Atmospheric Administration | Henry B. Bigelow | | Oscar Dyson-class fisheries research ship | R 225 | |
| 5 September | Latvian Naval Forces | Viesturs | | Imanta-class minehunter | M-05 | former HNLMS Scheveningen |
| 3 November | United States Navy | Sampson | | Arleigh Burke-class destroyer | DDG-102 | |
| 24 November | Indonesian Navy | Sultan Hasanuddin | | Sigma-class corvette | 366 | |
| 30 November | Royal Netherlands Navy | Johan de Witt | | Rotterdam-class amphibious transport dock | L801 | |
| 15 December | United States Navy | Mesa Verde | | San Antonio-class amphibious transport dock | LPD-19 | commissioned at Port Panama City, Panama City, FL |
