= List of ship commissionings in 2008 =

The list of ship commissionings in 2008 includes a chronological list of all ships commissioned in 2008.

	Operator	Ship	Flag	Class and type	Pennant	Other notes
22 February	Royal Australian Navy	Glenelg		Armidale-class patrol boat	ACPB 96	
27 March	Italian Navy	Cavour		Aircraft carrier	550	
4 April	Latvian Naval Forces	Tālivaldis		Imanta-class minehunter	M-06	former HNLMS Dordrecht
8 April	Belgian Navy	Louise-Marie		Karel Doorman-class frigate	F931	former HNLMS Willem van der Zaan
3 May	United States Navy	North Carolina		Virginia-class submarine	SSN-777	commissioned at Wilmington, North Carolina
6 June	United States Navy	Sterett		Arleigh Burke-class destroyer	DDG-104	
4 August	United States Navy	Bertholf		Legend-class cutter	WMSL-750	First in class
19 August	Royal Thai Navy	Pharuehatsabodi			813	
5 September	Republic of Korea Navy	Choe Yeong		Chungmugong Yi Sun-shin-class destroyer	DDH-981	
22 September	German Navy	Magdeburg		Braunschweig-class corvette	F261	
18 October	Indonesian Navy	Sultan Iskandar Muda		Sigma-class corvette	367	
15 October	Ecuadorian Navy	Comandante Rafael Morán Valverde			FM-02	
22 October	Latvian Naval Forces	Visvaldis		Imanta-class minehunter	M-07	former HNLMS Delfzijl
25 October	United States Navy	New Hampshire		Virginia-class submarine	SSN-778	
7 November	Chilean Navy	4201			4201	
8 November	United States Navy	Freedom		Freedom-class littoral combat ship	LCS-1	First in class
2 December	United States Navy	Crocodile		Marine Protector-class coastal patrol boat	WPB-87369	
10 December	Chilean Navy	Almirante Condell		Type 23 frigate	FF-06	Formerly HMS Marlborough (F233)
10 December	Russian Navy	Vitse-Admiral Zakharin			611	
22 December	People's Liberation Army Navy	Daishan Dao		Anwei-class Hospital ship	866	Also known as the "Peace Ark"
