= List of ship commissionings in 1989 =

The list of ship commissionings in 1989 includes a chronological list of all ships commissioned in 1989.

	Operator	Ship	Flag	Class and type	Pennant	Other notes
11 February	United States Navy	Princeton		Ticonderoga-class cruiser	CG-59	
11 February	United States Navy	Pasadena		Los Angeles-class submarine	SSN-752	
15 March	Royal Netherlands Navy	Vlaardingen		Alkmaar-class minehunter	M863	
18 March	United States Navy	Philippine Sea		Ticonderoga-class cruiser	CG-58	
22 April	United States Navy	Gunston Hall		Whidbey Island-class dock landing ship	LSD-44	
3 June	United States Navy	Newport News		Los Angeles-class submarine	SSN-750	
29 July	United States Navy	Wasp		Wasp-class amphibious assault ship	LHD-1	
5 August	United States Navy	Ingraham		Oliver Hazard Perry-class frigate	FFG-61	
20 September	Royal Netherlands Navy	Willemstad		Alkmaar-class minehunter	M864	
9 October	Royal Australian Navy	Westralia		Modified Leaf-class tanker	O 195	Former RFA Appleleaf
4 November	United States Navy	Chancellorsville		Ticonderoga-class cruiser	CG-62	
11 November	United States Navy	Abraham Lincoln		Nimitz-class aircraft carrier	CVN-72	
9 December	United States Navy	Normandy		Ticonderoga-class cruiser	CG-60	
