= Belgian minehunter Primula =

1990 Tripartite-class minehunter

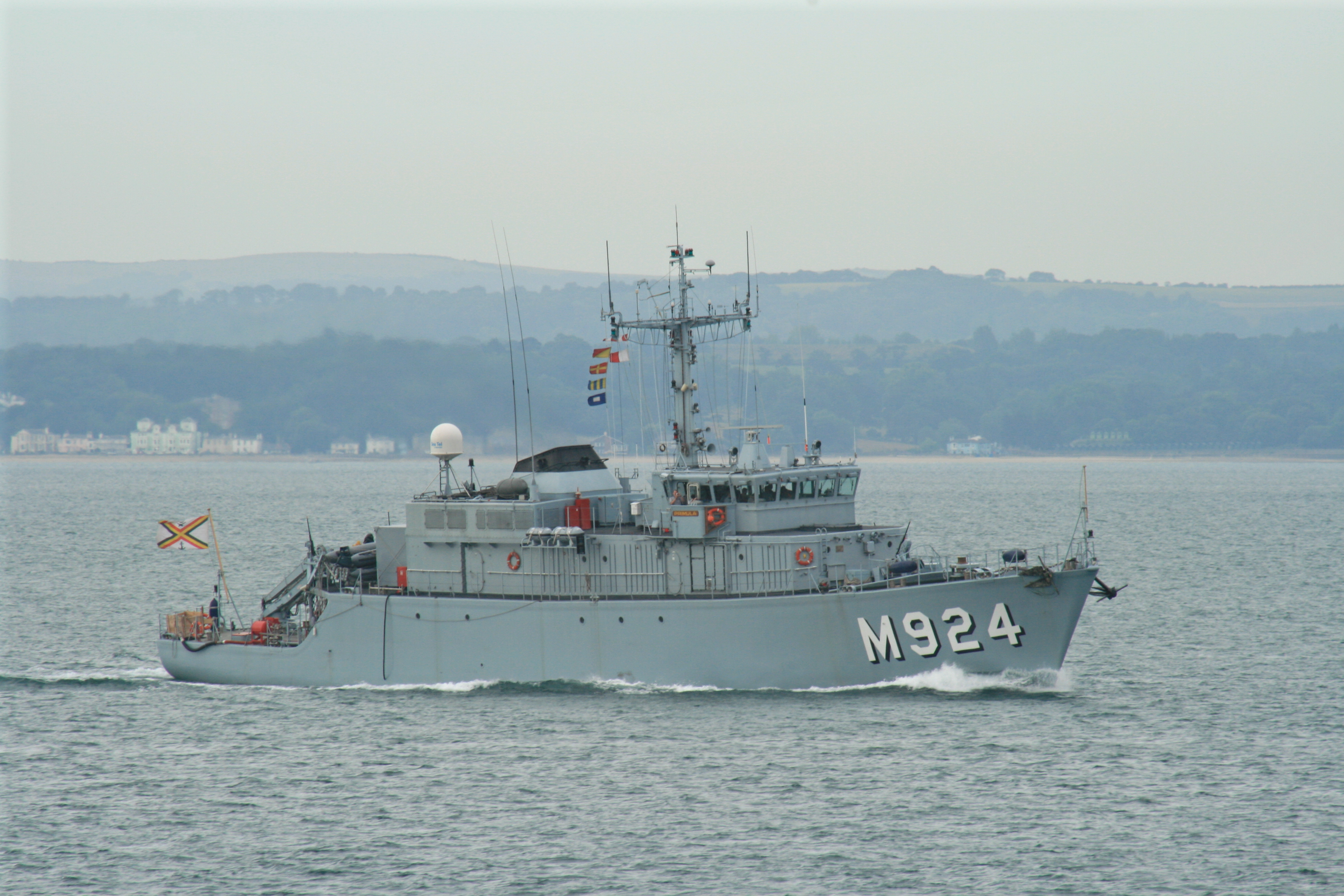
- Primula entering Portsmouth Naval Base, UK, 9 July 2010

History

Belgium
- Name: Primula
- Namesake: Primula
- Builder: Mercantile-Belyard Shipyard, Rupelmonde
- Launched: 20 December 1990
- Christened: 12 June 1991
- Identification: MMSI number: 205212000; Callsign: ORGP
- Motto: Major longinquo reverentia
- Status: in active service
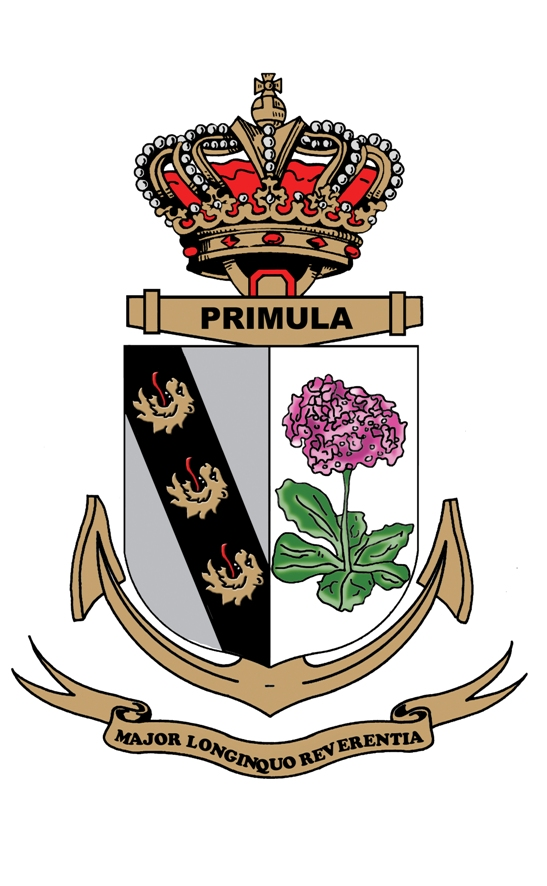
- Badge

General characteristics
- Class & type: Tripartite-class minehunter
- Displacement: 536 t (528 long tons) empty; 605 t (595 long tons) full load
- Length: 51.5 m (169 ft)
- Beam: 8.96 m (29.4 ft)
- Height: 18.5 m (61 ft)
- Draught: 3.6 m (12 ft)
- Propulsion: 1 × 1370 kW Werkspoor RUB 215 V12 diesel engine; 2 × 180 kW ACEC active rudders; 1 × HOLEC bow propeller
- Speed: 15 knots (28 km/h)
- Range: 3,000 nautical miles (5,600 km) at 12 knots (22 km/h)
- Boats & landing craft carried: 2 × rigid-hulled inflatable boats
- Complement: 4 officers, 15 non-commissioned officers, 17 sailors
- Sensors & processing systems: 1 × Thales Underwater Systems TSM 2022 Mk III Hull Mounted Sonar; 1 × SAAB Bofors Double Eagle Mk III Self Propelled Variable Depth Sonar; 1 × Consilium Selesmar Type T-250/10CM003 Radar
- Armament: 3 × 12.7 mm M2 machine guns; 10 × Atlas Elektronik Seafox ROV

The Belgian minehunter Primula (M924) is a Tripartite-class minehunter of the Belgian Navy, launched on 20 December 1990 at the Mercantile-Belyard shipyard in Rupelmonde and christened by Mrs. Adriaensens, the wife of the then Mayor of Willebroek, on 12 June 1991. The patronage of Primula was accepted by the city of Willebroek. It was the tenth and last of the Belgian Tripartite-class minehunters.

She underwent major modernization works in 2004-2005, such as the replacement of the PAP-minehunting system and 20mm-gun.

In September 2025 Belgium decided that it will donate Primula to Bulgarian Navy, along with Belgium's three other remaining Tripartite-class minehunters (Bellis, Crocus and Lobelia).

In October 2026, amidst the Bab El Mandeb crisis, a French frigate shot down a Houthi ballistic missile near the vessel.
