= Belgian minehunter Crocus =

Tripartite-class minehunter of the Belgian Navy

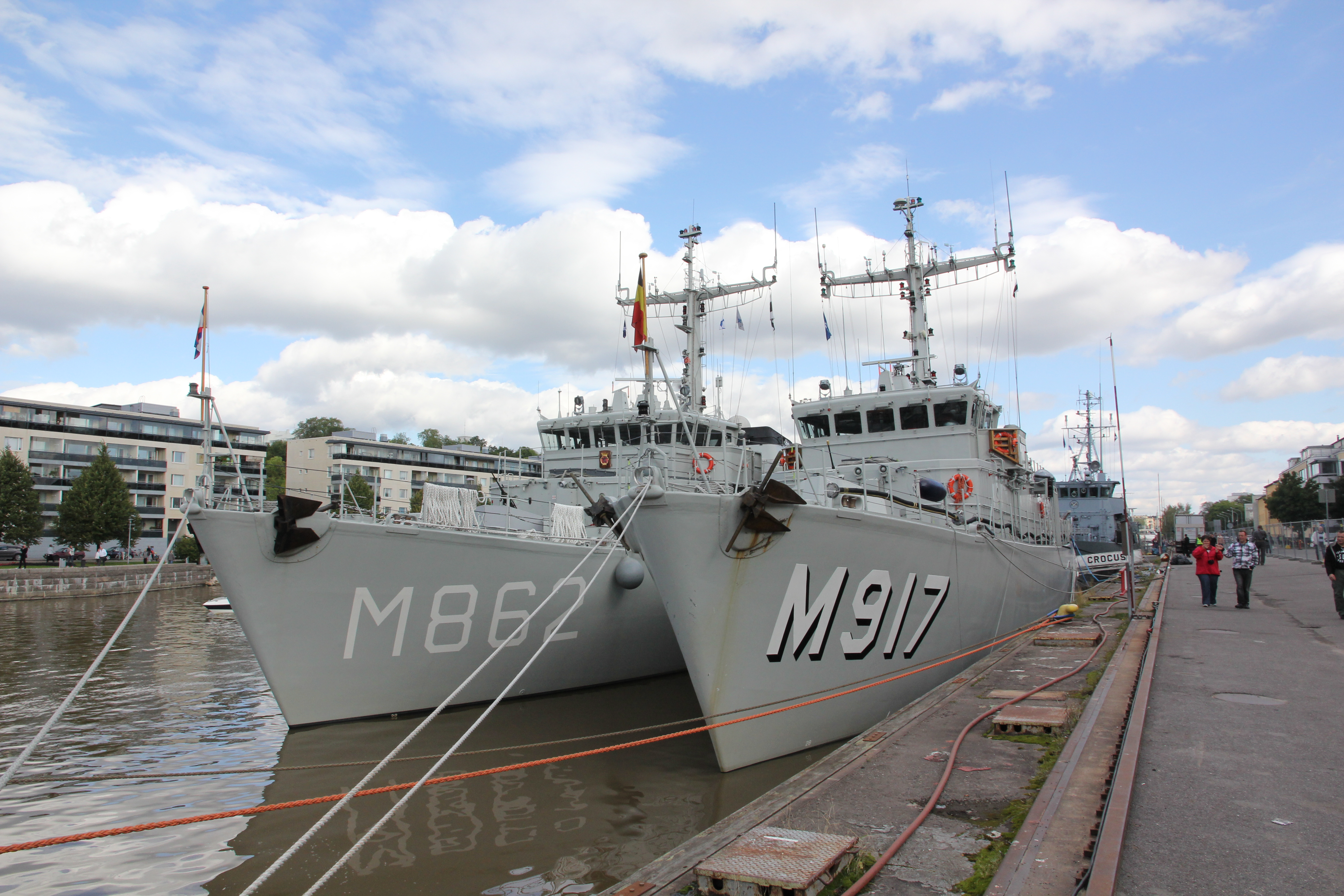
- Crocus (right) in Turku

History

Belgium
- Name: Crocus
- Namesake: Crocus
- Builder: Mercantile-Belyard Shipyard, Rupelmonde
- Launched: 3 September 1986
- Completed: 5 February 1987
- Identification: MMSI number: 205208000; Callsign: ORGC
- Status: in active service

General characteristics
- Class & type: Tripartite-class minehunter
- Displacement: 536 t (528 long tons) empty; 605 t (595 long tons) full load
- Length: 51.5 m (169 ft)
- Beam: 8.96 m (29.4 ft)
- Height: 18.5 m (61 ft)
- Draught: 3.6 m (12 ft)
- Propulsion: 1 × 1370 kW Werkspoor RUB 215 V12 diesel engine; 2 × 180 kW ACEC active rudders; 1 × HOLEC bow propeller
- Speed: 15 knots (28 km/h)
- Range: 3,000 nautical miles (5,600 km) at 12 knots (22 km/h)
- Boats & landing craft carried: 2 × rigid-hulled inflatable boats; 1 × Atlas Elektronik Seafox ROV
- Complement: 4 officers, 15 non-commissioned officers, 17 sailors
- Sensors & processing systems: 1 × Thales Underwater Systems TSM 2022 Mk III Hull Mounted Sonar; 1 × SAAB Bofors Double Eagle Mk III Self Propelled Variable Depth Sonar; 1 × Consilium Selesmar Type T-250/10CM003 Radar
- Armament: 3 × 12.7 mm machine guns

Crocus (M917) is a Tripartite-class minehunter of the Belgian Navy, launched on 3 September 1986 at the Mercantile-Belyard shipyard in Rupelmonde and completed on 5 February 1987. The patronage of Crocus was accepted by the city of Genk. It was the third of the Belgian Tripartite-class minehunters.

In September 2025 Belgium decided that it will donate Crocus to Bulgarian Navy, along with Belgium's three other remaining Tripartite-class minehunters (Bellis, Lobelia, and Primula).
