= Belgian minehunter Lobelia =

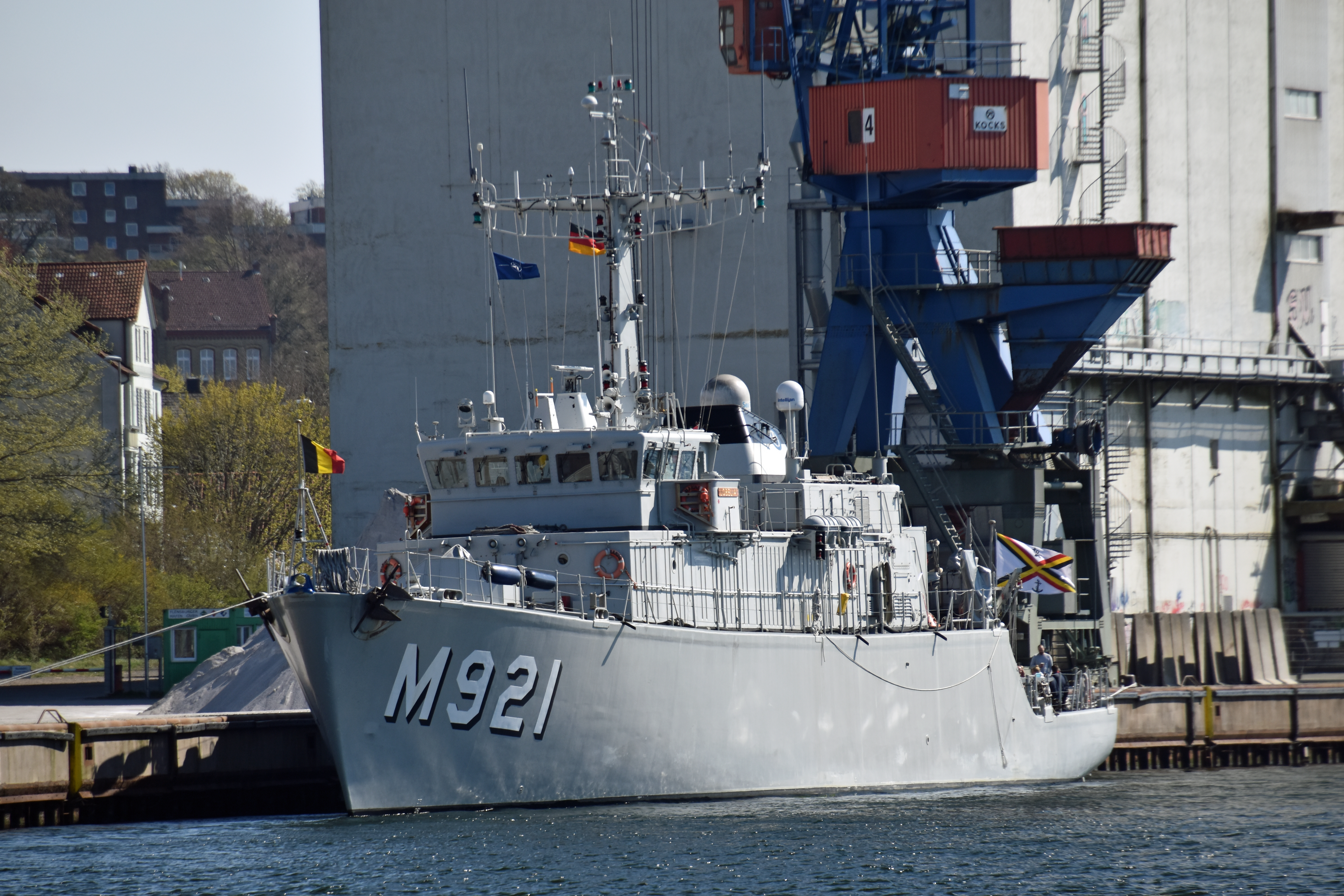
- Lobelia starting its journey at Flensburg, 1988

History

Belgium
- Name: Lobelia
- Namesake: Lobelia
- Builder: Mercantile-Belyard Shipyard, Rupelmonde
- Launched: 3 February 1988
- Christened: 25 February 1989
- Identification: MMSI number: 205209000; Callsign: ORGL
- Status: in active service

General characteristics
- Class & type: Tripartite-class minehunter
- Displacement: 536 t (528 long tons) empty; 605 t (595 long tons) full load
- Length: 51.5 m (169 ft)
- Beam: 8.96 m (29.4 ft)
- Height: 18.5 m (61 ft)
- Draught: 3.6 m (12 ft)
- Propulsion: 1 × 1370 kW Werkspoor RUB 215 V12 diesel engine; 2 × 180 kW ACEC active rudders; 1 × HOLEC bow propeller
- Speed: 15 knots (28 km/h)
- Range: 3,000 nautical miles (5,600 km) at 12 knots (22 km/h)
- Boats & landing craft carried: 2 × rigid-hulled inflatable boats; 1 × Atlas Elektronik Seafox ROV
- Complement: 4 officers, 15 non-commissioned officers, 17 sailors
- Sensors & processing systems: 1 × Thales Underwater Systems TSM 2022 Mk III Hull Mounted Sonar; 1 × SAAB Bofors Double Eagle Mk III Self Propelled Variable Depth Sonar; 1 × Consilium Selesmar Type T-250/10CM003 Radar
- Armament: 3 × 12.7 mm machine guns

Lobelia (M921) is a Tripartite-class minehunter of the Belgian Navy, launched on 3 February 1988 at the Mercantile-Belyard shipyard in Rupelmonde and christened by Anne Van De Kerckhof, the wife of the then Mayor of Diest, on 25 February 1989. The patronage of Lobelia was accepted by the city of Diest. It was the seventh of the Belgian Tripartite-class minehunters. The Belgian Naval Component announced on its website on 5 November 2007 that Mrs. Van De Kerckhof, the godmother of Lobelia, had died on 27 October. A delegation of the crew of Lobelia attended her funeral.

In September 2025 Belgium decided that it will donate Lobelia to Bulgarian Navy, along with Belgium's three other remaining Tripartite-class minehunters (Bellis, Crocus, and Primula).
