= Belgian minehunter Narcis =

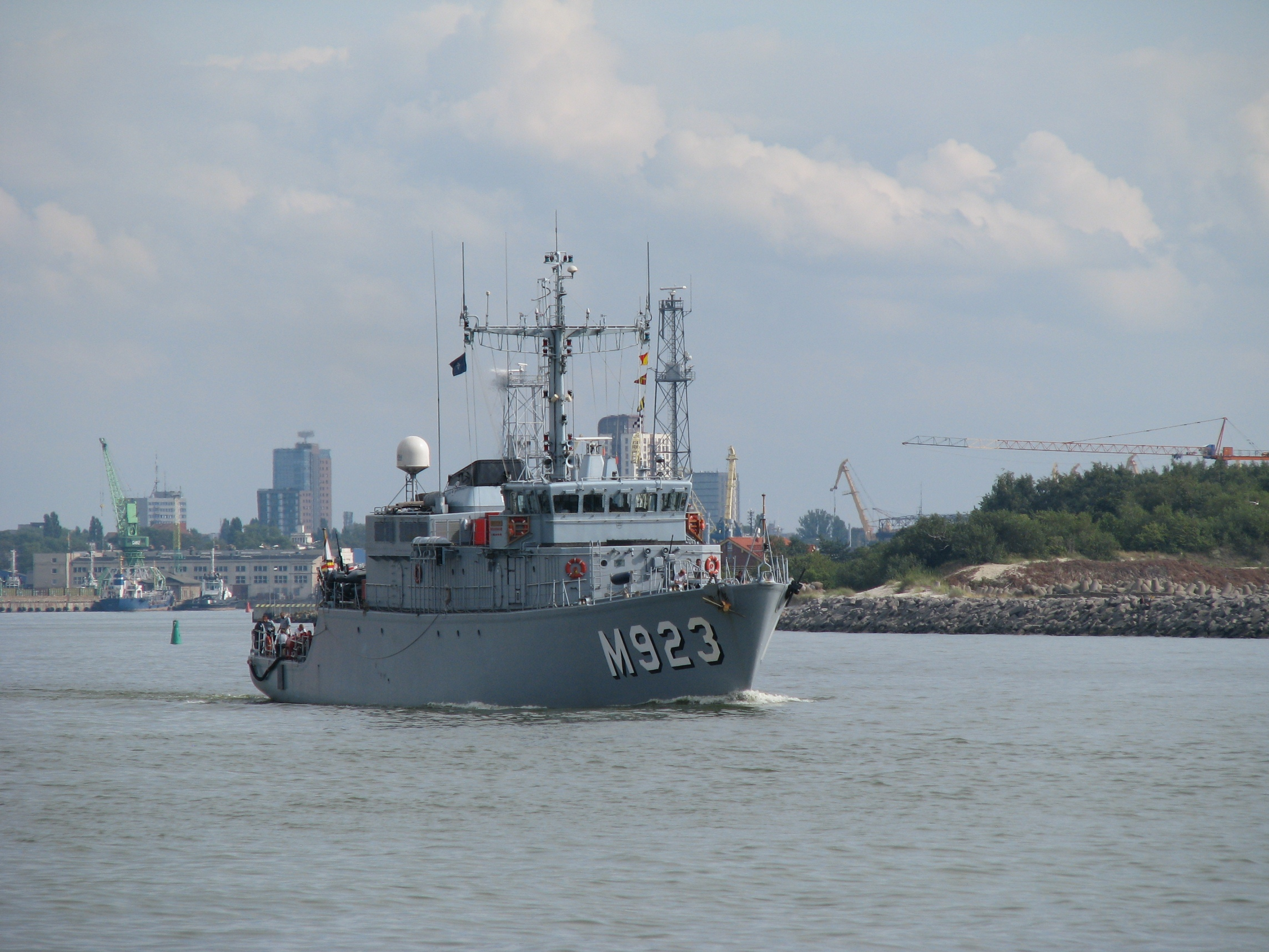
- Narcis M923

History

Belgium
- Name: Narcis
- Namesake: Narcissus
- Builder: Mercantile-Belyard Shipyard, Rupelmonde
- Laid down: 30 March 1990
- Launched: 27 September 1990
- Christened: 14 March 1991
- Commissioned: 30 March 1991
- Out of service: 2025
- Identification: Call sign: ORGN; MMSI number: 205211000
- Fate: Transferred to Ukraine
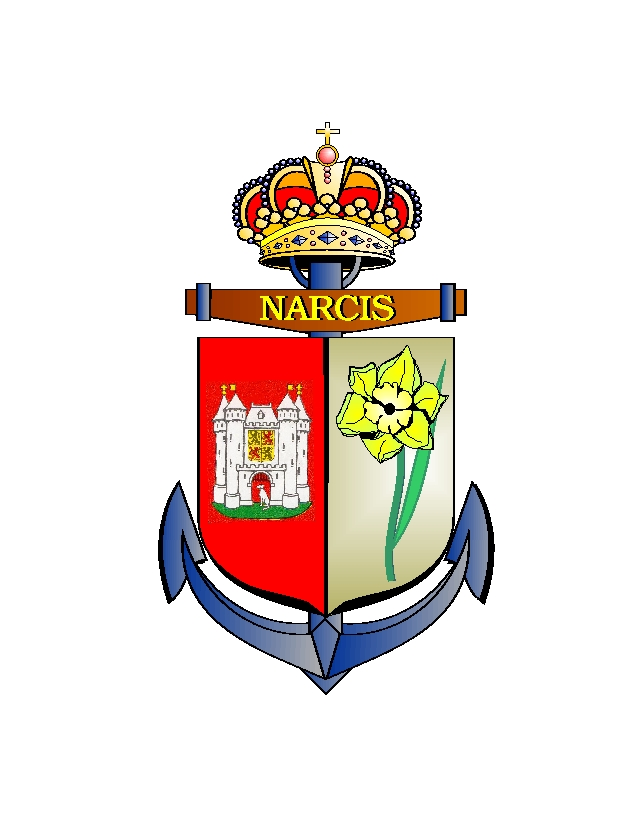
- Badge

Ukraine
- Name: Mariupol
- Namesake: Mariupol
- Acquired: 2025
- Identification: Callsign: Hull number: M313
- Status: in active service

General characteristics
- Class & type: Tripartite-class minehunter
- Displacement: 536 t (528 long tons) empty; 605 t (595 long tons) full load
- Length: 51.5 m (169 ft)
- Beam: 8.96 m (29.4 ft)
- Height: 18.5 m (61 ft)
- Draught: 3.6 m (12 ft)
- Propulsion: 1 × 1370 kW Werkspoor RUB 215 V12 diesel engine; 2 × 180 kW ACEC active rudders; 1 × HOLEC bow propeller
- Speed: 15 knots (28 km/h)
- Range: 3,000 nautical miles (5,600 km) at 12 knots (22 km/h)
- Boats & landing craft carried: 2 × rigid-hulled inflatable boats; 1 × Atlas Elektronik Seafox ROV
- Complement: 4 officers, 15 non-commissioned officers, 17 sailors
- Sensors & processing systems: 1 × Thales Underwater Systems TSM 2022 Mk III Hull Mounted Sonar; 1 × SAAB Bofors Double Eagle Mk III Self Propelled Variable Depth Sonar; 1 × Consilium Selesmar Type T-250/10CM003 Radar
- Armament: 3 × 12.7 mm machine guns

Mariupol, formerly Narcis (M923), is a Tripartite-class minehunter of the Ukrainian Navy, formerly belonging to Belgian Navy, launched in 1990, at the Mercantile-Belyard shipyard in Rupelmonde and christened (Narcis) by Mrs. Lafosse-De Backer, the wife of the then Mayor of Mons, on 14 March 1991. The patronage of Narcis was accepted by the city of Mons. It was the ninth of the Belgian Tripartite-class minehunters. The Belgian government chose to deploy the ship as part of its involvement with enforcing the Libyan no-fly zone.

In 2024, during the Russo-Ukrainian war, it was announced that Narcis was to be donated to Ukraine at some time in the future. The ship was to undergo full maintenance before donation. In total three Tripartite-class ships were announced (as of 2024) to be donated to Ukraine. Belgium was to provide basic training and the Netherlands offered on-the-job training for the crews.

In June 2025, Narcis was transferred to the Ukrainian Navy. It was renamed UNS Mariupol.
