= Belgian minehunter Aster =

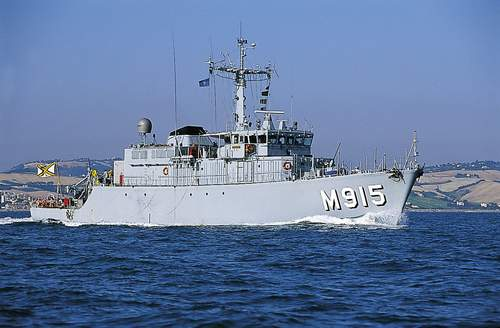
- Aster M915

History

Belgium
- Name: Aster
- Namesake: Aster
- Builder: Mercantile-Belyard Shipyard, Rupelmonde
- Launched: 16 December 1985
- Identification: Pennant number M915
- Status: in active service

General characteristics
- Class & type: Tripartite-class minehunter
- Displacement: 536 t (528 long tons) empty; 605 t (595 long tons) full load
- Length: 51.5 m (169 ft)
- Beam: 8.96 m (29.4 ft)
- Height: 18.5 m (61 ft)
- Draught: 3.6 m (12 ft)
- Propulsion: 1 × 1370 kW Werkspoor RUB 215 V12 diesel engine; 2 × 180 kW ACEC active rudders; 1 × HOLEC bow propeller
- Speed: 15 knots (28 km/h)
- Range: 3,000 nautical miles (5,600 km) at 12 knots (22 km/h)
- Boats & landing craft carried: 2 × rigid-hulled inflatable boats; 1 × Atlas Elektronik Seafox ROV
- Complement: 4 officers, 15 non-commissioned officers, 17 sailors
- Sensors & processing systems: 1 × Thales Underwater Systems TSM 2022 Mk III Hull Mounted Sonar; 1 × SAAB Bofors Double Eagle Mk III Self Propelled Variable Depth Sonar; 1 × Consilium Selesmar Type T-250/10CM003 Radar
- Armament: 3 × 12.7 mm machine guns

Aster is a Tripartite-class minehunter of the Belgian Navy, launched on 16 December 1985 at the Mercantile-Belyard shipyard in Rupelmonde and christened by Queen Paola of Belgium. The patronage of Aster was accepted by the city of Blankenberge. Aster was the first of the Belgian Tripartite-class minehunters.

On 11 October 2007, Aster was damaged when the minesweeper collided with a fuel lighter on the River Scheldt.

In early October 2018, it was reported that the Pakistan Navy had received a decommissioned MCMV from Belgium. Jane's in its article, speculated that this could be Aster decommissioned by the Belgian Navy. Further, since the details were not provided by the parties involved, it was not clear whether the Pakistan Navy will operate it or use it as spares.
