= Belgian minehunter Bellis =

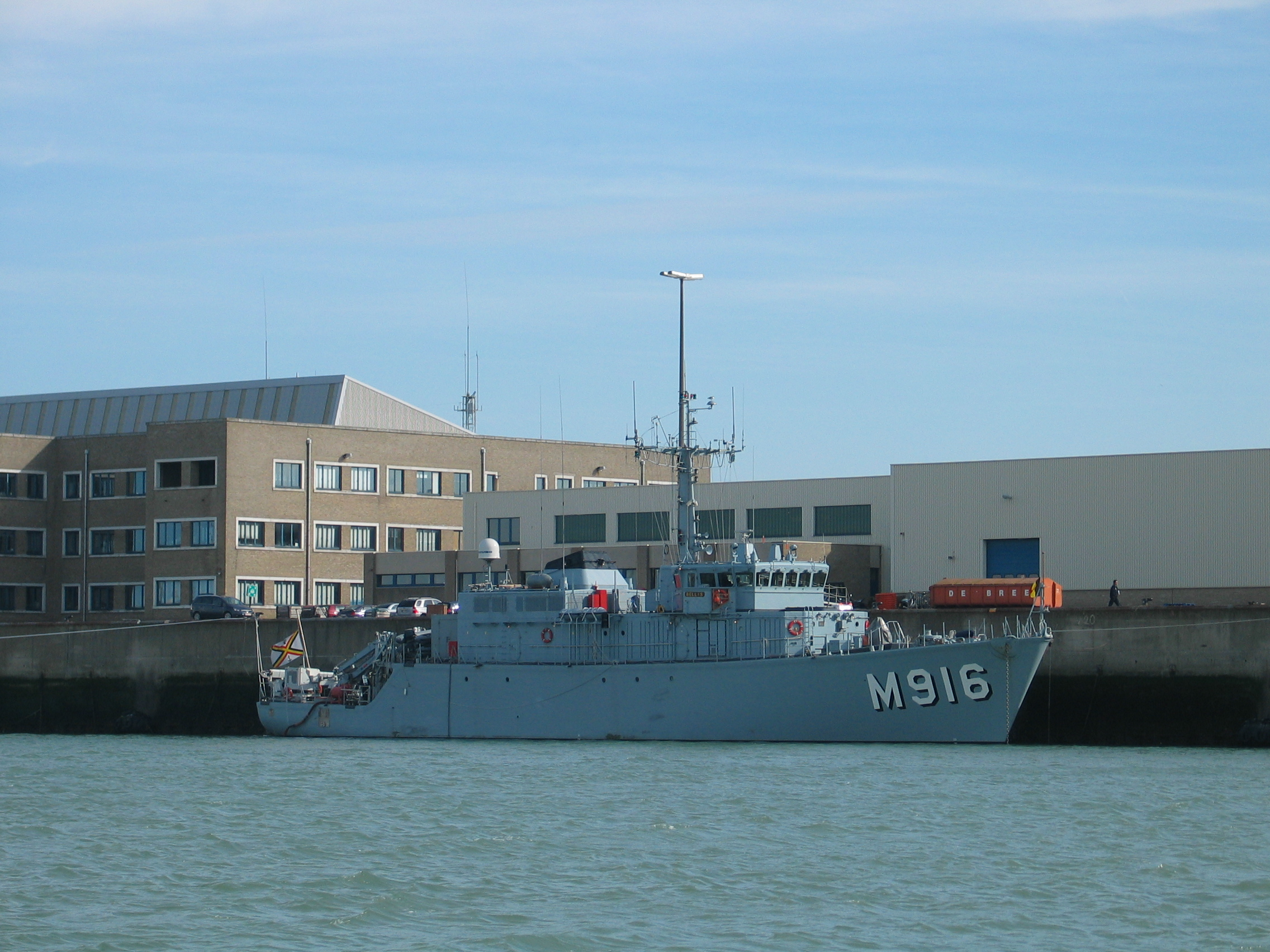
- Bellis

History

Belgium
- Name: Bellis
- Builder: Mercantile-Belyard, Rupelmonde
- Laid down: 9 February 1984
- Launched: 14 February 1986
- Christened: 18 September 1986
- Commissioned: 13 August 1986
- Out of service: October 2026
- Identification: MMSI number: 205207000; Callsign: ORGB
- Motto: Luctor et emergo; (Latin: "I struggle and emerge")
- Fate: Donated to Bulgaria 30 October 2026

Bulgaria
- Name: Briz
- Acquired: 30 October 2026
- Commissioned: 30 October 2026
- Identification: MMSI number: Callsign: Hull number: 61
- Status: in active service, as of 2026

General characteristics
- Class & type: Tripartite-class minehunter
- Displacement: 560 t (551 long tons)
- Length: 51.5 m (169 ft 0 in)
- Beam: 8.96 m (29 ft 5 in)
- Height: 18.5 m (60 ft 8 in) above waterline
- Draught: 3.6 m (11 ft 10 in)
- Propulsion: 1 × 1,370 kW (1,837 hp) Werkspoor RUB 215 V12 diesel engine; 2 × 180 kW (241 hp) ACEC active rudders; 1 × HOLEC bow propeller
- Speed: 15 knots (28 km/h; 17 mph)
- Range: 3,000 nmi (5,600 km) at 12 knots (22 km/h; 14 mph)
- Boats & landing craft carried: 2 × rigid-hulled inflatable boats; 1 × Atlas Elektronik Seafox remote controlled submersible for mine identification and disposal
- Complement: 4 officers, 15 non-commissioned officers, 17 sailors
- Sensors & processing systems: 1 Thales Underwater Systems TSM 2022 Mk III Hull Mounted Sonar; 1 SAAB Bofors Double Eagle Mk III Self Propelled Variable Depth Sonar; 1 Consilium Selesmar Type T-250/10CM003 Radar
- Armament: 3 × FN .50 caliber (12.7 mm) machine guns

Bellis (M916) (name in Belgian service) or Briz (name in Bulgarian service) is a Tripartite-class minehunter of the Bulgarian Navy, formerly of the Belgian Navy, launched on 14 February 1986 at the Mercantile-Belyard shipyard in Rupelmonde and christened by Ellen Goffinet-Rosman, the wife of the then Mayor of Arlon, on 18 September 1986. The patronage of Bellis was accepted by the city of Arlon. It was the second of the Belgian Tripartite-class minehunters.

Commissioned on 13 August 1986, the ship participated the rescue of the survivors of ferry Herald of Free Enterprise in March 1987 which had capsized outside the port of Zeebrugge.

Bellis was attached to NATO's Mine Countermeasure Force (North) (MCMFORNORTH) in 1987, 1990, 1996, 1998, 1999, 2002 and 2004, and to Mine Countermeasures Force (South) (MCMFORSOUTH) in 1992, 1995, 1997, 1999, and 2003.

In September 2025 Belgium decided that it will donate Bellis to Bulgarian Navy, along with Belgium's three other remaining Tripartite-class minehunters (Crocus, Lobelia, and Primula).

On 30 October 2026 Bellis was donated to Bulgaria and renamed Briz.

== Pictures ==
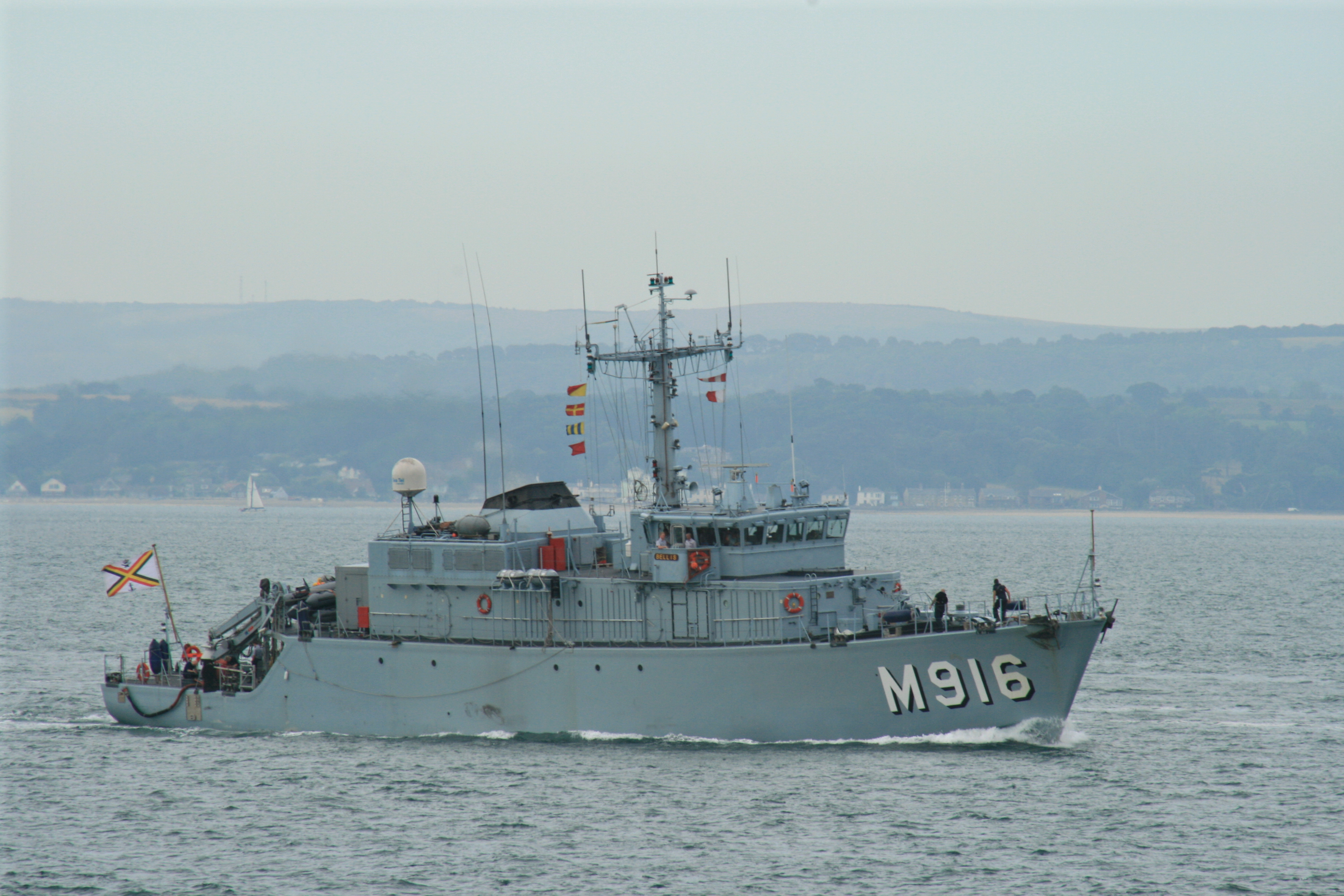
BNS Bellis entering Portsmouth Naval Base, UK, 9 July 2010.
