= Latvian minehunter Rūsiņš =

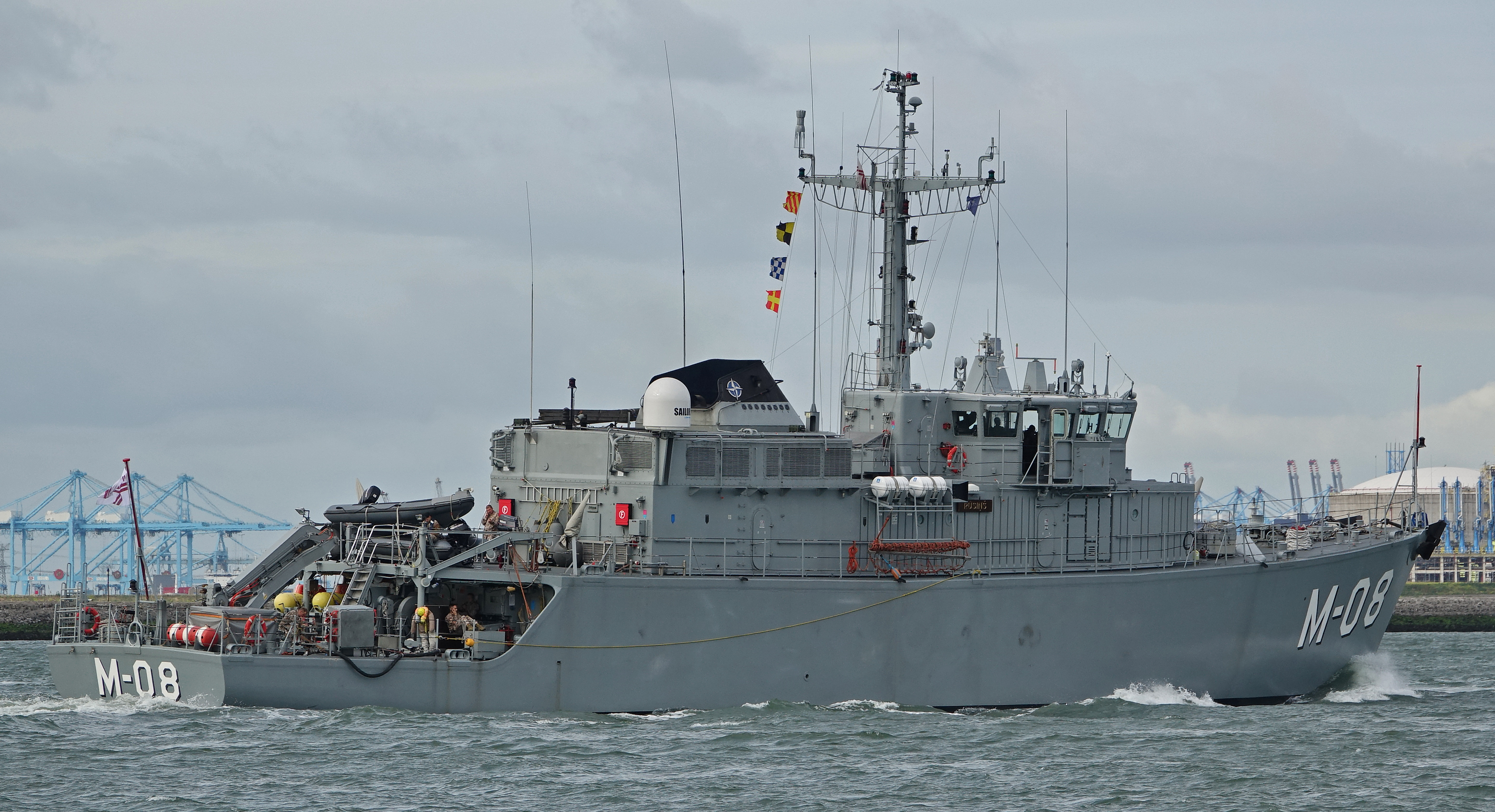

History

Netherlands
- Name: Alkmaar
- Namesake: The city of Alkmaar
- Builder: Van der Giessen de Noord, Alblasserdam
- Laid down: 30 January 1979
- Launched: 2 May 1982
- Commissioned: 28 May 1983
- Decommissioned: 15 May 2000
- Identification: Hull number: M850
- Fate: Sold to the Latvian Navy

Latvia
- Name: Rūsiņš
- Cost: €11.4 million (2007) (equivalent to €15.21 million in 2025)
- Acquired: 2007
- Commissioned: 2011
- Identification: Hull number: M-08
- Status: In active service

General characteristics
- Type: Alkmaar-class minehunter
- Displacement: 588 t (579 long tons) full load
- Length: 51.50 m (169 ft 0 in)
- Beam: 8.90 m (29 ft 2 in)
- Height: 18.5 m (60 ft 8 in)
- Draft: 2.60 m (8 ft 6 in)
- Propulsion: 1 × 1,860 hp (1,390 kW) Werkspoor RUB 215 V12 diesel engine
- Speed: 15 knots (28 km/h; 17 mph)
- Range: 3,000 nmi (5,600 km; 3,500 mi) at 12 knots (22 km/h)
- Boats & landing craft carried: 2 × rigid-hulled inflatable boats; 1 × PAP 104 ROV
- Crew: 44
- Sensors & processing systems: 1 × DUBM 21B sonar
- Armament: 1 × 20 mm (0.79 in) machine gun

Rūsiņš (M-08) (ex-HNLMS Alkmaar (A850)) is a former minehunter of the Royal Netherlands Navy. She is presently in service with the Latvian Navy.

== History ==
Alkmaar is the result of a cooperation between France, Belgium and The Netherlands. She is the lead ship of her class and the second ship in the Dutch Navy to be named Alkmaar. The commissioning ceremony took place in Alblasserdam on 28 May 1983.

Alkmaar was sold to the Latvian Navy in 2007 together with the Delfzijl, Dordrecht, Harlingen and Scheveningen. She was transferred in 2011 and renamed Rūsiņš.
