= Bulgarian minehunter Tsibar =

History

Belgium
- Name: Myosotis
- Namesake: Myosotis
- Builder: Beliard-Murdoch, Ostend
- Laid down: 6 July 1987
- Launched: 4 August 1988
- Completed: 14 December 1989
- Stricken: 2004
- Fate: Sold to Bulgaria

Bulgaria
- Name: Tsibar
- Identification: MMSI number: 207523000; Callsign: LZBX; Hull number: 32
- Status: in active service, as of 2010

General characteristics (in Belgian service)
- Class & type: Tripartite-class minehunter
- Displacement: 536 t (528 long tons) empty; 605 t (595 long tons) full load
- Length: 51.5 m (169 ft)
- Beam: 8.96 m (29.4 ft)
- Height: 18.5 m (61 ft)
- Draught: 3.6 m (12 ft)
- Propulsion: 1 × 1370 kW Werkspoor RUB 215 V12 diesel engine; 2 × 180 kW ACEC active rudders; 1 × HOLEC bow propeller
- Speed: 15 knots (28 km/h)
- Range: 3,000 nautical miles (5,600 km) at 12 knots (22 km/h)
- Boats & landing craft carried: 2 × rigid-hulled inflatable boats; 1 × Atlas Elektronik Seafox ROV
- Complement: 4 officers, 15 non-commissioned officers, 17 sailors
- Sensors & processing systems: 1 × Thales Underwater Systems TSM 2022 Mk III Hull Mounted Sonar; 1 × SAAB Bofors Double Eagle Mk III Self Propelled Variable Depth Sonar; 1 × Consilium Selesmar Type T-250/10CM003 Radar
- Armament: 3 × 12.7 mm machine guns

Tsibar is a Tripartite-class minehunter of the Bulgarian Navy. The ship was formerly Myosotis (M922) of the Belgian Naval Component. Myosotis' keel was laid on 6 July 1987 at Ostend yard of Beliard-Murdoch. She was launched on 4 August 1988 and completed on 14 December 1989. Myosotis was stricken from the Belgian Naval Component in 2004 and sold to Bulgaria.
