= HNLMS Makkum =

Alkmaar-class minehunter

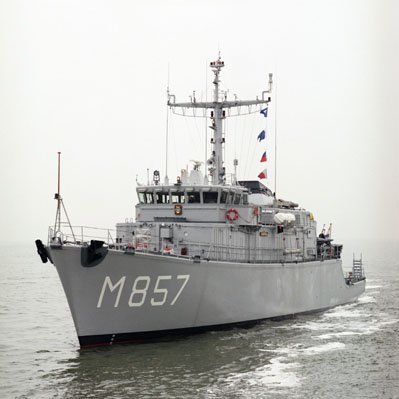

History

Netherlands
- Name: Makkum
- Namesake: Makkum
- Builder: Van der Giessen de Noord, Alblasserdam
- Laid down: 28 February 1983
- Launched: 27 September 1984
- Commissioned: 8 May 1985
- Decommissioned: 25 November 2024
- Identification: Hull number: M857
- Fate: Donated to the Ukrainian Navy
- Badge

Ukraine
- Name: Henichesk
- Acquired: 2025
- Commissioned: 2025
- Identification: Hull number: M314
- Status: Active

General characteristics
- Type: Alkmaar-class minehunter
- Displacement: 588 t (579 long tons) full load
- Length: 51.50 m (169 ft 0 in)
- Beam: 8.90 m (29 ft 2 in)
- Height: 18.5 m (60 ft 8 in)
- Draft: 2.60 m (8 ft 6 in)
- Propulsion: 1 × 1,860 hp (1,390 kW) Werkspoor RUB 215 V12 diesel engine
- Speed: 15 knots (28 km/h; 17 mph)
- Range: 3,000 nmi (5,600 km; 3,500 mi) at 12 knots (22 km/h)
- Boats & landing craft carried: 2 × rigid-hulled inflatable boats; 1 × PAP 104 ROV
- Crew: 44
- Sensors & processing systems: 1 × DUBM 21B sonar
- Armament: 1 × 20 mm (0.79 in) machine gun

Henichesk (M314) (ex-HNLMS Makkum (M857)) is a former minehunter of the Royal Netherlands Navy now in service with the Ukrainian Navy.

== History ==
=== Dutch service ===
Makkum was the result of a cooperation between France, Belgium and The Netherlands. She was the eighth ship of the class in Dutch service and the first ship in the Dutch Navy to be named Makkum. The commissioning ceremony took place in Alblasserdam on 8 May 1985.

The decommissioning ceremony took place on 27 March 2024.

=== Ukrainian service ===
Makkum was pledged to the Ukrainian Navy in 2024 together with the Vlaardingen following the Russian invasion of Ukraine. She was transferred in 2025 and renamed Henichesk. The ship couldn't travel to the Black Sea because of the Montreux Convention and was initially stored in Plymouth, England.

In May 2026 it was reported that the minehunter had been used in the last few weeks to train her future Ukrainian crew.

A ceremony for the transfer of the ship was held 15 June 2026.
