= Tripartite-class minehunter =

Ship class of minehunters

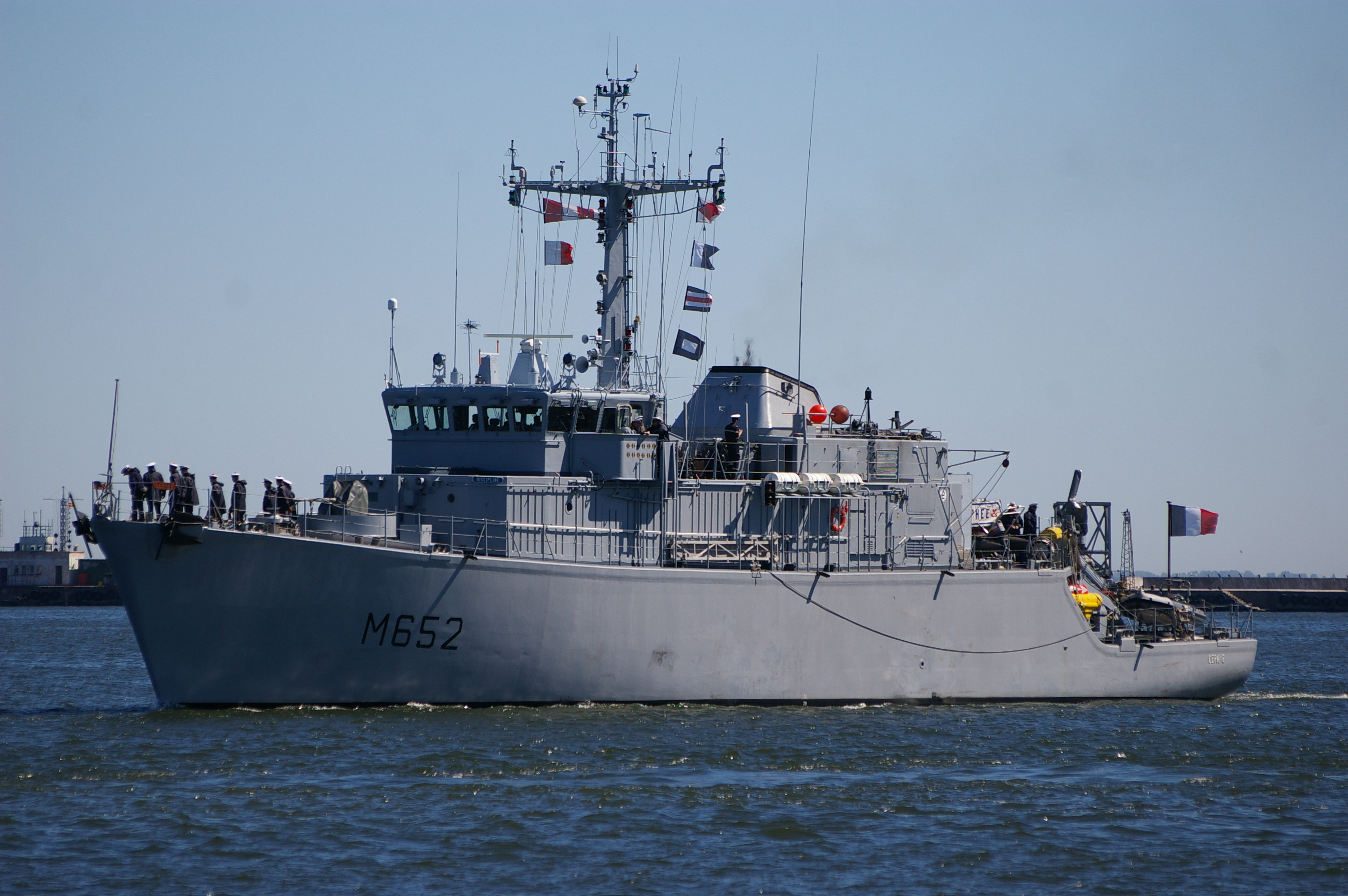
- French Tripartite minehunter Céphée

Class overview
- Name: Tripartite class
- Operators: Initial; Belgian Navy; French Navy; Royal Netherlands Navy; Export; Bulgarian Navy; Indonesian Navy; Latvian Naval Forces; Pakistan Navy; Ukrainian Navy
- Succeeded by: City class; Vlissingen class
- Subclasses: Éridan class; Alkmaar class; Munsif class; Pulau Rengat class
- Built: 1977–1995
- In commission: 1983–present
- Planned: 60
- Completed: 40
- Canceled: 20
- Active: 22
- Laid up: 7

General characteristics of French ships as built
- Type: Minehunter
- Displacement: 571 t (562 long tons); 605 t (595 long tons) full load
- Length: 51.6 m (169 ft 3 in)
- Beam: 8.9 m (29 ft 2 in)
- Draught: 3.8 m (12 ft 6 in)
- Propulsion: 1 × Brons-Werkspoor A-RUB 215V-12 diesel engine; 1,400 kW (1,900 hp), 1 shaft; 2 × 180 kW (240 hp) ACEC active rudders; 1 × bow thruster
- Speed: 15 knots (28 km/h; 17 mph)
- Range: 3,000 nmi (5,600 km; 3,500 mi) at 12 knots (22 km/h; 14 mph)
- Boats & landing craft carried: 2 × PAP 104
- Complement: 55
- Sensors & processing systems: 1 × DUBM 21B sonar; 1 × Decca 1229 navigation radar
- Armament: 1 × 20 mm modèle F2 gun; 2 × 12.7 mm machine guns; 2 × 7.62 mm machine guns

The Tripartite class is a class of minehunters developed from an agreement between the navies of Belgium, France and the Netherlands. A total of 35 ships were constructed for the three navies. The class was constructed in the 1980s–1990s in all three countries, using a mix of minehunting, electrical and propulsion systems from the three member nations. In France, where they are known as the Éridan class they are primarily used as minehunters, but have been used for minesweeping and ammunition transport in Belgium and the Netherlands. In the Netherlands, the Tripartites are known as the Alkmaar class.

In 1992, the Pakistan Navy acquired three vessels from France, one that was already built, one to be built in France and one built in France and Pakistan. Known as the Munsif class, all three are still in service. The Indonesian Navy acquired two minehunters in the 1990s from the Dutch to a modified design. Known as the Pulau Rengat class, the two ships are still in service. In 1997, France purchased three of the Belgian vessels. In 2007, the Latvian Naval Forces acquired five ships from the Netherlands which had been taken out of service at the beginning of the decade. The Bulgarian Navy acquired a former Belgian minehunter in 2007. The Netherlands and Belgium had a competition in 2018 to build a replacement class for their Tripartite/Alkmaar-class ships.

== Design and development ==
A joint venture of the navies of France, Belgium, and the Netherlands, the Tripartite class of minehunters were a follow on design to the French Circé-class minehunters. All three nations would build their own hulls while each country was responsible for a different aspect of the vessels; France provided the minehunting and electronic systems, the Netherlands provided the main propulsion systems and Belgium supplied the minehunting propulsion system as well as the electrical generating systems. Each country intended to order 15 of the vessels, with Belgium's initial order being 10 with the option of 5 more. However, France cut their initial order to ten due to budgetary reasons.

== Ships ==
=== France ===
Sagittaire (left) with USS Sentry (rear) and HMS Shoreham (front) in the Persian Gulf

In France the class is known as the Éridan class. Each hull was created from fibreglass, moulded in a steel shell. The hulls were 51.6 metres (169 ft 3 in) long overall with a beam of 8.9 metres (29 ft 2 in) and a draught of 3.8 metres (12 ft 6 in). The ships had a standard displacement of 571 tonnes (562 long tons) and 605 t (595 long tons) at full load. This later increased to 625 t (615 long tons) at full load. A 5.1 tonnes (5 long tons) container can be stored aboard the ships for additional supply room. The minehunters had an initial complement of 55, this was later reduced to 49.

The Éridan-class minehunters have two independent propulsion systems. In normal operations the minehunters are powered by a 1,400-kilowatt (1,900 bhp) Brons-Werkspoor (later Wärtsilä) A-RUB 215V-12 diesel engine turning one shaft with a LIPS controllable pitch propeller. Using the conventional system, the minehunters have a maximum speed of 15 knots (28 km/h; 17 mph) and a range of 3,000 nautical miles (5,600 km; 3,500 mi) at 12 knots (22 km/h; 14 mph). For use when minehunting the vessels have two 180 kW (240 hp) ACEC active rudders and a bow thruster. These are energised by three Astazou IVB gas turbine alternators rated at 150 kW. A fourth diesel-driven alternator rated at 160 kW supplies power during normal operations. Both systems can be operated from the bridge or from a soundproof control centre above the main deck. The maximum speed using the minehunting propulsion system that can be achieved is 7 knots (13 km/h; 8.1 mph).

The minehunters were equipped with DUBM 21B sonar that could detect and classify ground and moored mines to a range of 80 metres (260 ft). The sonar was retracted during normal operations. The vessel was also equipped with Racal Decca 1229 radar. The vessels carried two ECA PAP 104 remotely operated underwater vehicles (ROVs). In 2001, the minesweepers underwent modernisation and the sonar was replaced with the TUS 2022 Mk III type, the radar with the Bridgemaster E250 type and a TSM 2061 combat data system and a Bofors Double Eagle Mk2 ROV were fitted.

The Éridan class is armed with one 20 mm modèle F2 gun capable of firing 720 rounds per minute to a range of 2 kilometres (1.2 mi). The minehunters also mount one 12.7 mm (0.5 in) machine gun and two 7.62 mm (0.30 in) machine guns. The French vessels have limited minesweeping ability and were initially only fitted with mechanical sweep gear. In 1985, the Éridan class received AP4 acoustic sweep gear.

The initial order of ten was constructed for the French Navy in the 1980s by the Arsenal de Lorient. After the sale of Sagittaire to Pakistan in 1992, a replacement hull bearing the same name and hull number was constructed. Three Belgian versions of the class were acquired between March and August 1997.

Éridan class construction data
Pennant no.	Name	Builder	Laid down	Launched	Commissioned	Status
M 641	Éridan	Arsenal de Lorient, Lorient, France	20 December 1977	2 February 1979	16 April 1984	Decommissioned in 2018
M 642	Cassiopée	Arsenal de Lorient, Lorient, France	26 March 1979	26 September 1981	5 May 1984	Decommissioned 1 July 2022
M 643	Andromède	Arsenal de Lorient, Lorient, France	6 March 1980	22 May 1982	18 October 1984	
M 644	Pégase	Arsenal de Lorient, Lorient, France	22 December 1980	23 April 1983	30 May 1985	
M 645	Orion	Arsenal de Lorient, Lorient, France	17 August 1981	6 February 1985	14 January 1986	Out of service 2023
M 646	Croix du Sud	Arsenal de Lorient, Lorient, France	22 April 1982	6 February 1985	14 November 1986	
M 647	Aigle	Arsenal de Lorient, Lorient, France	2 December 1982	8 March 1986	1 July 1987	
M 648	Lyre	Arsenal de Lorient, Lorient, France	13 October 1983	14 November 1986	16 December 1987	
M 649	Persée	Arsenal de Lorient, Lorient, France	30 October 1984	19 April 1988	4 November 1988	Decommissioned in August 2009
M 650	Sagittaire (1988)	Arsenal de Lorient, Lorient, France	13 November 1985	9 November 1988	28 July 1989	Sold to Pakistan in 1992, renamed Munsif.
M 650	Sagittaire (1995)	Arsenal de Lorient, Lorient, France	1 February 1993	14 January 1995	2 April 1996	Replacement for Sagittaire (1988).
M 651	Verseau	Béliard Shipyard, Ostend and Rupelmonde, Belgium	20 May 1986	21 June 1987		Former Belgian Iris, decommissioned in February 2010
M 652	Céphée	Béliard Shipyard, Ostend and Rupelmonde, Belgium	28 October 1985	23 October 1987		Former Belgian Fuchsia
M 653	Capricorne	Béliard Shipyard, Ostend and Rupelmonde, Belgium	17 April 1985	26 February 1987		Former Belgian Dianthus

=== Belgium ===
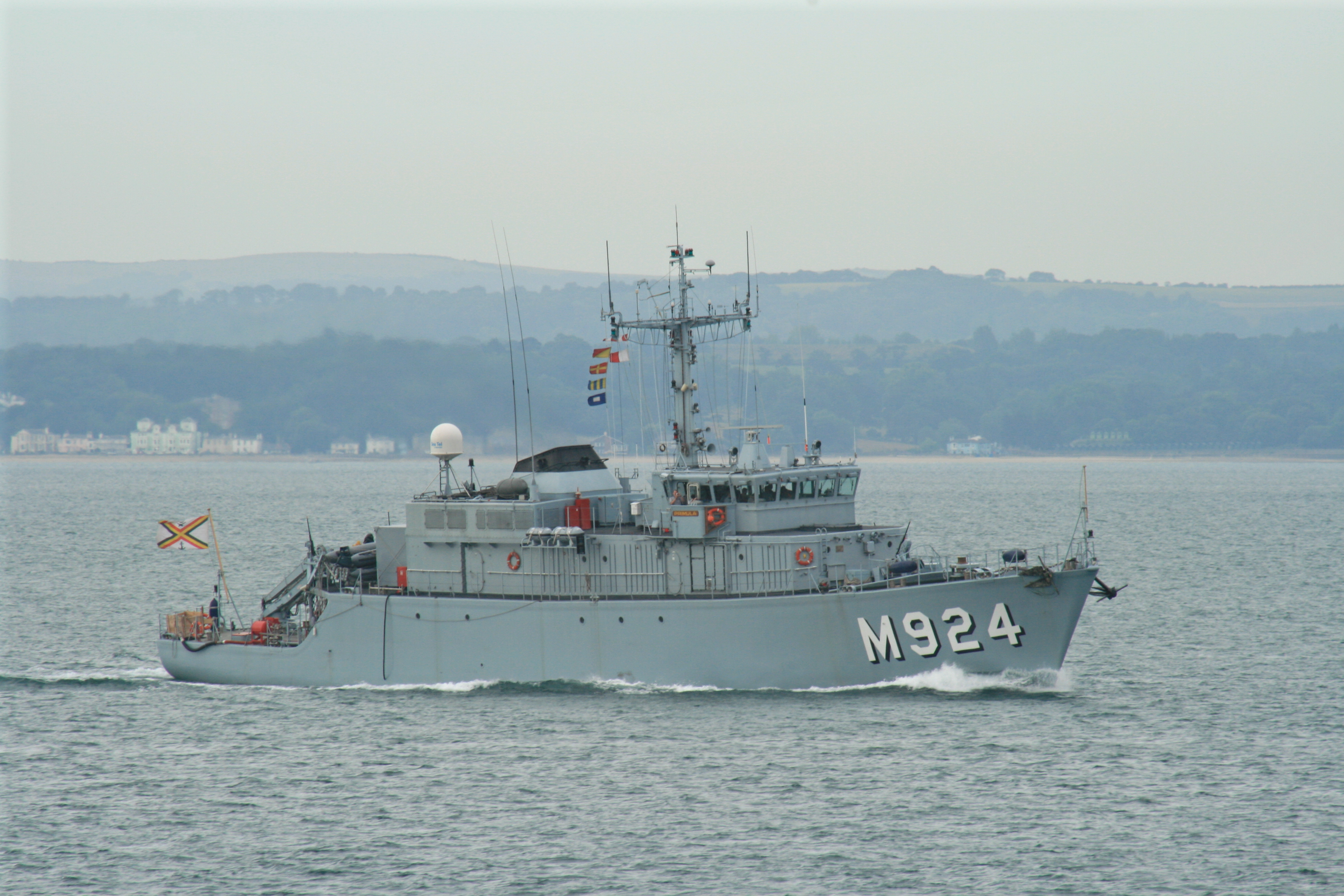
Primula

Originally ten ships were ordered for the Belgian Navy, with the option for five more that was never activated. The Polyship consortium was organised to direct the building programme, however the consortium was dissolved, leading to delays in the construction of the minehunters. This led to the vessels being reordered this time from Béliard Shipyard, which constructed the hulls at their yard in Ostend, Belgium before completing the minehunters at Rupelmonde. Differences between the Belgian and French versions of the class include a smaller displacement at 519 tonnes (511 long tons) standard and 574 tonnes (565 long tons) at full load. They are equipped with an Atlas Elektronik IMCMS combat data system. When minehunting, the Belgian vessels carry six divers and can have a portable decompression chamber installed abaft the forecastle break.

All vessels in the class are named after flowers and are thus sometimes called the "Flower" or Aster class. In 2001 the remaining Belgian minehunters had their engines upgraded. All remaining Belgian vessels have undergone an extensive upgrade during 2004–2008 involving replacement of the anti-mine warfare equipment. This included receiving the same sonar package as the French versions. The complement of the Belgian ships varies between 33 and 46 depending on mission.

In 1993, three of the vessels (Iris, Fuschia and Dianthus) were paid off and laid up until being sold in 1997 to France. Crocus was modified into an ammunition transfer vessel the same year. Myosotis was converted to an ammunition transport before being taken out of service in 2004 and was sold to Bulgaria in 2009.

Tripartite class construction data
Pennant no.	Name	Builder	Laid down	Launched	Commissioned	Status
M 915	Aster	Béliard Shipyard, Ostend and Rupelmonde, Belgium	24 February 1983	6 June 1985	16 December 1985	Sold to Pakistan in 2018
M 916	Bellis	Béliard Shipyard, Ostend and Rupelmonde, Belgium	15 February 1984	14 February 1986	13 August 1986	Donated to Bulgaria 30 October 2026 and renamed Briz.
M 917	Crocus	Béliard Shipyard, Ostend and Rupelmonde, Belgium	15 October 1984	5 September 1986	5 July 1987	To be donated to Bulgaria
M 918	Dianthus	Béliard Shipyard, Ostend and Rupelmonde, Belgium	17 April 1985	26 February 1987	14 August 1987	Laid up 1993, sold to France 1997
M 919	Fuschia	Béliard Shipyard, Ostend and Rupelmonde, Belgium	28 October 1985	23 October 1987	18 February 1988	Laid up 1993, sold to France 1997
M 920	Iris	Béliard Shipyard, Ostend and Rupelmonde, Belgium	20 May 1986	21 June 1987	6 October 1988	Laid up 1993, sold to France 1997
M 921	Lobelia	Béliard Shipyard, Ostend and Rupelmonde, Belgium	27 November 1986	25 February 1988	8 July 1989	To be donated to Bulgaria
M 922	Myosotis	Béliard Shipyard, Ostend and Rupelmonde, Belgium	6 July 1987	4 August 1988	14 December 1989	Converted to ammunition transport. Taken out of service in 2004 and sold to Bulgaria in 2009.
M 923	Narcis	Béliard Shipyard, Ostend and Rupelmonde, Belgium	22 February 1988	30 March 1990	27 September 1990	Gifted to Ukraine in 2025, renamed to Mariupol.
M 924	Primula	Béliard Shipyard, Ostend and Rupelmonde, Belgium	7 November 1988	17 December 1990	29 May 1991	To be donated to Bulgaria

=== Netherlands ===
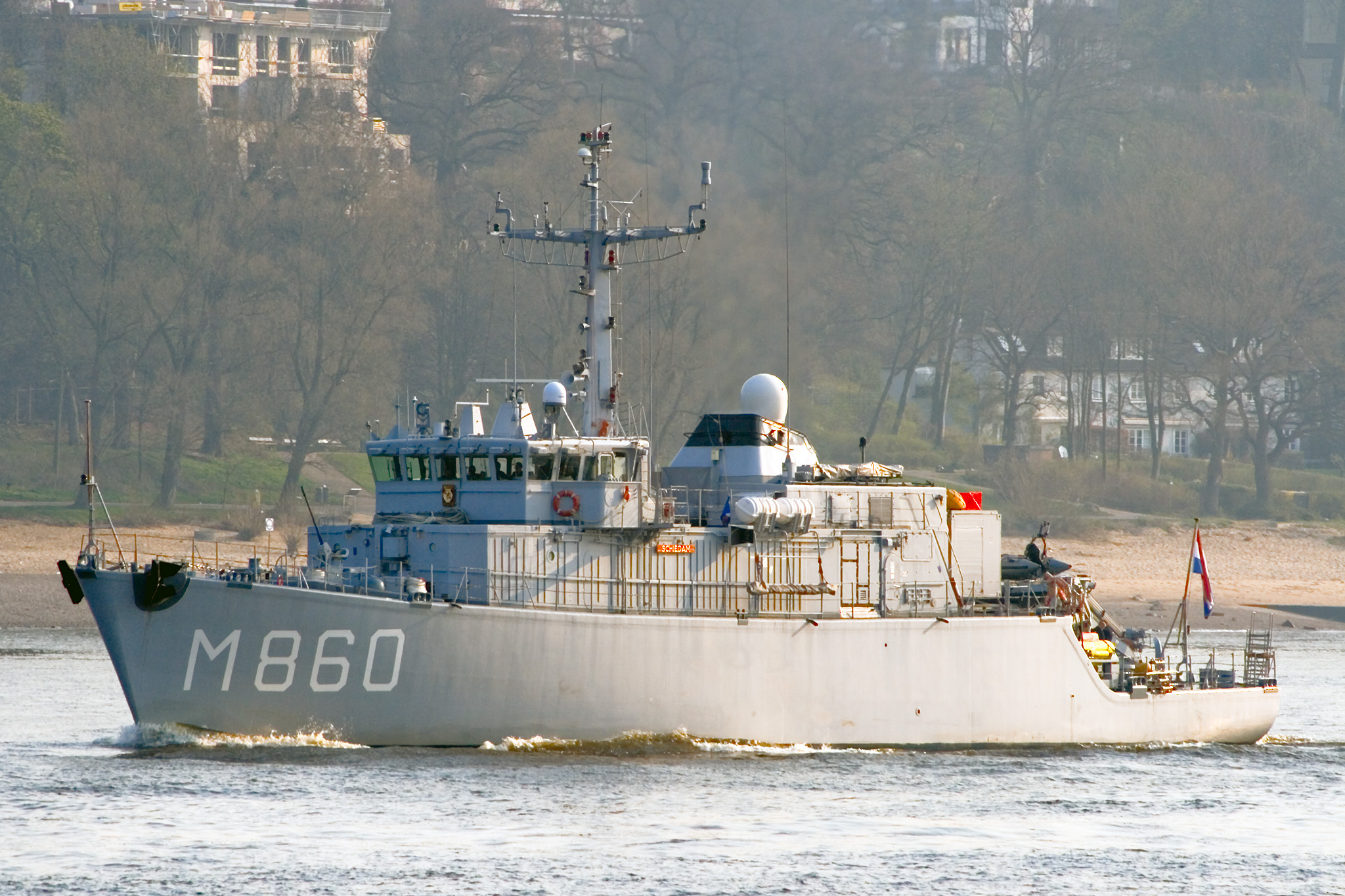
HNLMS Schiedam

In the Royal Netherlands Navy, the Tripartites are known as the Alkmaar class. The Alkmaars were originally of similar design to the Belgian and French versions, with a standard displacement of 520 tonnes (510 long tons) and 553 tonnes (544 long tons) at full load. The displacement later increased to 571 tonnes (562 long tons) standard and 605 tonnes (595 long tons) at full load and then 630 tonnes (620 long tons) standard and 660 tonnes (650 long tons) at full load. The 20 mm gun that was initially mounted was removed, leaving only three 12.7 mm machine guns. Beginning in 2003, the remaining Dutch Alkmaar-class minehunters were upgraded with improved electronics, including Atlas Elektronik INCMS combat data system, Thales 2022 Mk III hull-mounted sonar, Atlas Seafox Mine Identification and Disposal System and a Double Eagle Mk III Mod 1 ROV.

The minehunters were constructed at the Van der Giessen-de-Noord yard in Amsterdam, a specially constructed site completed in 1978. Middelburg and Hellevoetsluis were optioned by Egypt, but due to financial issues, were instead completed for the Royal Netherlands Navy. Two ships of a modified design were built for the Indonesian Navy which led to the delay of Vlaardingen and Willemstad's construction.

In 2000, three ships (Alkmaar, Delfzijl and Dordrecht) were withdrawn from service, followed by two more (Harlingen and Scheveningen) in 2003. All five were sold to Latvia with handovers beginning in 2007. Four more ships, (Haarlem, Maassluis, Middelburg and Hellevoetsluis) were decommissioned in 2011 following a series of deep budget cuts to the navy. Two of them (Maassluis and Hellevoetsluis) were sold to Bulgaria in 2019. In 2021 it was indicated that a further two ships would be sold to Pakistan. Haarlem and Middelburg were transported via a heavy-lift ship to Pakistan in late 2022.

As of 2023, the Netherlands is planning to transfer two Alkmaar-class ships to Ukraine in 2025. The vessels would be used to clear mines dropped into the Black Sea during Russia's invasion of Ukraine.

Alkmaar class construction data
Pennant no.	Name	Builder	Laid down	Launched	Commissioned	Status
M 850	Alkmaar	Van der Giessen-de-Noord, Alblasserdam, Netherlands	30 January 1979	18 May 1982	28 May 1983	Decommissioned in 2000, sold to Latvia
M 851	Delfzijl	Van der Giessen-de-Noord, Alblasserdam, Netherlands	29 May 1980	29 October 1982	17 August 1983	Decommissioned in 2000, sold to Latvia
M 852	Dordrecht	Van der Giessen-de-Noord, Alblasserdam, Netherlands	5 January 1981	26 February 1983	16 November 1983	Decommissioned in 2000, sold to Latvia
M 853	Haarlem	Van der Giessen-de-Noord, Alblasserdam, Netherlands	16 June 1981	6 May 1983	12 June 1984	Decommissioned in 2011, sold to Pakistan
M 854	Harlingen	Van der Giessen-de-Noord, Alblasserdam, Netherlands	30 November 1981	9 July 1983	12 April 1984	Decommissioned 2003, sold to Latvia
M 855	Scheveningen	Van der Giessen-de-Noord, Alblasserdam, Netherlands	24 May 1982	2 December 1983	18 July 1984	Decommissioned 2003, sold to Latvia
M 856	Maassluis	Van der Giessen-de-Noord, Alblasserdam, Netherlands	7 November 1982	5 May 1984	12 December 1984	Decommissioned in 2011, sold to Bulgaria
M 857	Makkum	Van der Giessen-de-Noord, Alblasserdam, Netherlands	25 February 1983	27 September 1984	13 May 1985	Decommissioned in 2024, donated to Ukraine in 2025, renamed Henichesk
M 858	Middelburg	Van der Giessen-de-Noord, Alblasserdam, Netherlands	11 July 1983	23 February 1985	10 December 1986	Decommissioned in 2011, sold to Pakistan
M 859	Hellevoetsluis	Van der Giessen-de-Noord, Alblasserdam, Netherlands	12 December 1983	18 July 1985	20 February 1987	Decommissioned in 2011, sold to Bulgaria
M 860	Schiedam	Van der Giessen-de-Noord, Alblasserdam, Netherlands	6 May 1984	20 December 1985	9 July 1986	to be donated to Bulgaria in 2027-2028
M 861	Urk	Van der Giessen-de-Noord, Alblasserdam, Netherlands	1 October 1984	2 May 1986	10 December 1986	Decommissioned in 2022 use for spare parts
M 862	Zierikzee	Van der Giessen-de-Noord, Alblasserdam, Netherlands	25 February 1985	4 October 1986	7 May 1987	to be donated to Bulgaria in 2027-2028
M 863	Vlaardingen	Van der Giessen-de-Noord, Alblasserdam, Netherlands	6 May 1986	4 August 1988	15 March 1989	Decommissioned in 2024, donated to Ukraine in 2025, renamed Melitopol
M 864	Willemstad	Van der Giessen-de-Noord, Alblasserdam, Netherlands	3 October 1986	27 January 1989	20 September 1989	to be donated to Bulgaria in 2027-2028

== Export ==
=== Bulgaria ===
The Bulgarian Navy acquired one Tripartite-class minehunter from Belgium in 2007 and two from the Netherlands in 2019. The ex-Myosotis was transferred in 2009 and renamed Tsibar. The ex-Maasluis and ex-Hellevoetsluis were transferred in 2020 and renamed Mesta and Struma, respectively.

In 2025, Bulgaria expressed interest in the remaining Belgian and Dutch Tripartite-class mine hunters, due to the remaining threat of mines in the Black Sea. In September 2025, the Belgian government decided to donate its four remaining Tripartite-class minehunters to Bulgaria. Bulgaria will pay Belgian companies €24 million for their modernization. The Dutch government is considering donating its last three remaining Tripartite-class minehunters to Bulgaria as well. On 15 September Gijs Pepijn Tuinman confirmed three Dutch Alkmaar-class minesweepers will be delivered to Bulgaria in 2027 and 2028. On 30 October 2026, the ex-Bellis was transferred and renamed Briz.

Tripartite class class construction data
Pennant no.	Name	Builder	Laid down	Launched	Commissioned	Status
32	Tsibar (ex-Myosotis)	Béliard Shipyard, Ostend, Belgium	6 July 1987	4 August 1988	2010	In service
31	Mesta (ex-Maasluis)	Van der Giesen-de-Noord, Alblasserdam, Netherlands	7 November 1982	5 May 1984		In service
33	Struma (ex-Hellevoetsluis)	Van der Giesen-de-Noord, Alblasserdam, Netherlands	12 December 1983	18 July 1985		In service
61	Briz (ex-Bellis)	15 February 1984	14 February 1986	13 August 1986	30 October 2026	In service

=== Indonesia ===
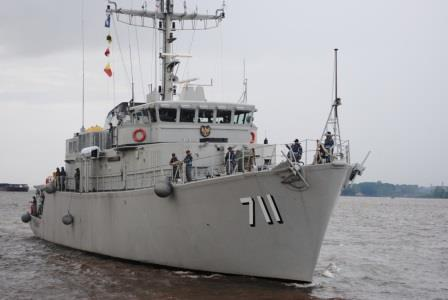
KRI Pulau Rengat

The Indonesian Navy ordered two minehunters based on the Alkmaar class from the Netherlands on 29 March 1985. Known as the Pulau Rengat class, the vessels have a standard displacement of 520 tonnes (510 long tons) and 594 tonnes (585 long tons) at full load. They have a different layout than European Tripartite minehunters due to their mission profile being larger, with the vessels intended to operate as minehunters, minesweepers and patrol ships. For conventional missions the vessels are powered by two MTU 12V 396 TCD91 diesel engines turning one shaft with a LIPS controllable pitch propeller rated at 1,400 kilowatts (1,900 hp) for a maximum speed of 15.5 knots (28.7 km/h; 17.8 mph). The minehunters are also equipped with two 56-kilowatt (75 hp) bow thrusters and two retractable Schottel 89-kilowatt (120 hp) rudder propellers energised by three Turbomecca gas turbine generators. Using the auxiliary propulsion system, the Pulau Rengat class has a maximum speed of 7 knots (13 km/h; 8.1 mph). They have a range of 3,500 nautical miles (6,500 km; 4,000 mi) at 10 knots (19 km/h; 12 mph).

The Pulau Rengat class mounts two Rheinmetall 20 mm guns and have the capability to have Matra Simbad surface-to-air missile launchers installed or a third 20 mm gun. The Pulau Rengats are equipped with OD3 Oropesa mechanical sweep gear, Fiskar F82 magnetic sweep and SA Marine AS 203 acoustic sweep gear for minesweeping duties. They also have an Ibis V minehunting system and two PAP 104 Mk 4 mine disposal systems along with the Signaal SEWACCO-RI combat data system, Racal Decca AC 1229C radar and Thomson Sintra TSM 2022 sonar. The ships have a complement of 46.

Initially, Indonesia intended to order ten hulls. However, funds were lacking and only two were built. The first was ordered on 29 March 1985 and the second on 30 August 1985. The two ships were initially part of the Royal Netherlands Navy production and were given Dutch names. They were renamed upon sale to Indonesia.

Pulau Rengat class construction data
Pennant no.	Name	Builder	Laid down	Launched	Commissioned	Status
711	Pulau Rengat (ex-Willemstad)	Van der Giesen-de-Noord, Amsterdam, Netherlands	22 July 1985	23 July 1987	26 March 1988	In service
712	Pulau Rupat (ex-Vlaardingen)	Van der Giesen-de-Noord, Amsterdam, Netherlands	15 December 1985	27 August 1987	26 March 1988	In service

=== Latvia ===
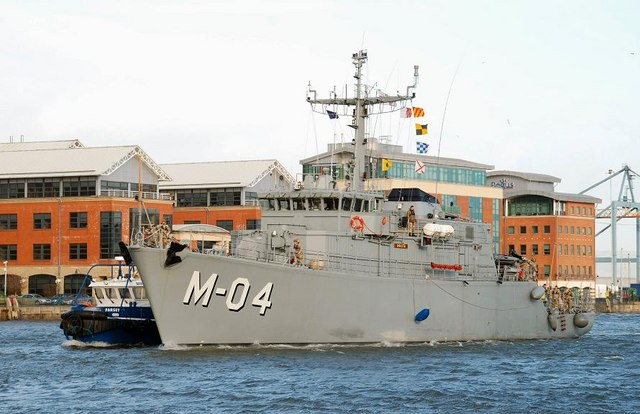
Imanta in Belfast

In 2007, the Latvian Naval Forces acquired five Alkmaar-class minehunters (Alkmaar, Delfzijl, Dordrecht, Harlingen and Scheveningen) from the Royal Netherlands Navy. These five use the Signaal Sewaaco IX combat data system and the Thomson Sintra DUBM 21A sonar. Harlingen was the first handed over and renamed Imanta on 6 March 2007, followed by Scheveningen on 5 September 2007 which was renamed Viesturs. Dordrecht was handed over in January 2008 and renamed Tālivaldis and Delfzijl in October 2008 and renamed Visvaldis. Alkmaar was the last to transfer in June 2009 and was renamed Rūsiņš. In 2020, the Latvian Naval Forces signed a contract with ECA Group for the modernization of three of its Alkmaar-class minehunters, replacing the conventional detection system based on a hull sonar for mines with a smaller unmanned system consisting of the underwater drones AUV A18-M for detection and underwater robots Seascan MK2 and K-STER C for identification and clearance of the mines.

Imanta class class construction data
Pennant no.	Name	Builder	Laid down	Launched	Commissioned	Status
M-04	Imanta (ex-Harlingen)	Van der Giesen-de-Noord, Alblasserdam Netherlands	30 November 1981	9 July 1983	2007	In service
M-05	Viesturs (ex-Scheveningen)	Van der Giesen-de-Noord, Alblasserdam Netherlands	24 May 1982	2 December 1983	2007	In service
M-06	Tālivaldis (ex-Dordrecht)	Van der Giesen-de-Noord, Alblasserdam Netherlands	5 January 1981	26 February 1983	2008	In service
M-07	Visvaldis (ex-Delfzijl)	Van der Giesen-de-Noord, Alblasserdam Netherlands	29 May 1980	29 October 1982	2008	In service
M-08	Rūsiņš (ex-Alkmaar)	Van der Giesen-de-Noord, Alblasserdam Netherlands	30 January 1979	18 May 1982	2011	In service

=== Pakistan ===
On 17 January 1992, Pakistan signed an agreement with France acquiring three Éridan-class minehunters, one of which was already built, one to be constructed in France and the third in Pakistan. Sagittaire, which was on duty in the Persian Gulf, sailed to Pakistan in November 1992. In Pakistan Navy service, the three ships have Elesco MKR 400 acoustic sweep and MKR 960 magnetic sweeps for minesweeping duties.

The class is known as the Munsif class in Pakistan Navy service. The first of the class Munsif sailed to Pakistan from the Persian Gulf. The second, Muhafiz was delivered in April 1996 and the third was carried aboard a transporter ship in April 1995 to be completed in Pakistan. A further two ships were bought from the Netherlands in 2021. Haarlem and Middelburg, were transported via a heavy-lift ship to Pakistan in late 2022.

Munsif class construction data
Pennant no.	Name	Builder	Laid down	Launched	Commissioned	Status
M166	Munsif (ex-Sagittaire)	Arsenal de Lorient, Lorient, France	13 November 1985	9 November 1988	26 October 1992	In service
M163	Muhafiz	Arsenal de Lorient, Lorient, France		8 July 1995	15 May 1996	In service
M164	Mujahid	Arsenal de Lorient/Karachi Naval Dockyard, Karachi, Pakistan		28 January 1997	9 July 1998	In service
TBA	TBA (ex-Haarlem)	Van der Giessen-de-Noord, Alblasserdam, Netherlands	16 June 1981	6 May 1983	TBA	In transport
TBA	TBA (ex-Middelburg)	Van der Giessen-de-Noord, Alblasserdam, Netherlands	11 July 1983	23 February 1985	TBA	In transport

=== Ukraine ===
On a visit to the port cities of Mykolaiv and Odesa, Dutch Minister of Defence Kajsa Ollongren announced that two ships will be donated to the Ukrainian Navy after the Russian invasion of Ukraine has ended. The ships will help clear out mines on shipping lanes in the Black Sea. In 2024, HNLMS Vlaardingen was retired from service and started training Ukrainian crew, HNLMS Makkum is slated to follow later in the same year. In March 2024, Belgian defence minister Ludivine Dedonder announced that Narcis would also be transferred to Ukraine, increasing the total of Tripartite-class minehunters to be transferred to three. In June 2025 Narcis and Vlaardingen were transferred to the Ukrainian Navy and renamed Mariupol and Melitopol, respectively. A third vessel of the class, HNLMS Makkum was to be donated to Ukrainian Navy later in 2025, and was to be renamed to Henichesk.

Tripartite class class construction data
Pennant no.	Name	Builder	Laid down	Launched	Commissioned	Status
M312	Melitopol (ex-Vlaardingen)	Van der Giesen-de-Noord, Alblasserdam, Netherlands	5 May 1986	6 August 1988	2025	In service
M313	Mariupol (ex-Narcis)	Béliard Shipyard, Ostend, Belgium	22 February 1988	30 March 1990	2025	In service
M314	Henichesk (ex-Makkum)	Van der Giesen-de-Noord, Alblasserdam, Netherlands	28 February 1983	27 September 1984	TBA	Awaiting commissioning

== Successor ==
=== The Netherlands and Belgium ===
The Netherlands and Belgium are doing a joint procurement for the replacements of the Tripartite-class/Alkmaar-class minehunters. Both countries want to procure six new mine countermeasure (MCM) vessels, which makes for a total of 12 MCM ships. The new MCM ships will include a range of unmanned systems including unmanned surface, aerial and underwater vehicles alongside towed sonars and mine identification and neutralization ROVs.

Belgium gave the green-light to start the procurement on 26 January 2018 and approved a budget of 1.1 billion euros for the six Belgian MCM ships. Besides the Tripartite-class minehunters, the ships will also replace the Belgian logistical support ship Godetia.

There were three contenders. A Franco-Belgium consortium made up of French shipbuilders STX France and Socarenam together with Belgium's EDR bid for the 12 new MCM vessels. Their plan included the construction of MCM vessels named Sea Naval Solutions and a multi-role frigate named Deviceseas, which will serve as mothership to the MCM vessels. All ships having a strong focus on autonomous systems operations. France's Naval Group and ECA Group established Belgian subsidiary Naval & Robotics to bid for the program. The third group was Imtech Belgium and Damen Group.

On 15 March 2019, the team led by Naval Group was selected to produce the 12 new vessels.

== See also ==
- Minehunter classes in service
