= HNLMS Vlaardingen =

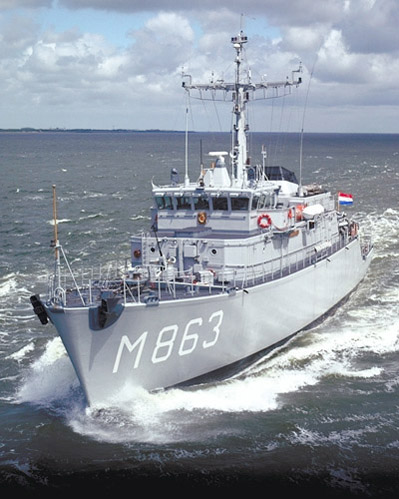

History

Netherlands
- Name: Vlaardingen
- Namesake: The city of Vlaardingen
- Builder: Van der Giessen de Noord, Alblasserdam
- Laid down: 5 May 1986
- Launched: 6 August 1988
- Commissioned: 15 March 1989
- Decommissioned: 27 March 2024
- Identification: Hull number: M868
- Fate: Donated to the Ukrainian Navy
- Badge

Ukraine
- Name: Melitopol
- Cost: €11.4 million (2007) (equivalent to €15.21 million in 2025)
- Acquired: 2025
- Commissioned: 2025
- Identification: Hull number: M312
- Status: In active service

General characteristics
- Type: Alkmaar-class minehunter
- Displacement: 588 t (579 long tons) full load
- Length: 51.50 m (169 ft 0 in)
- Beam: 8.90 m (29 ft 2 in)
- Height: 18.5 m (60 ft 8 in)
- Draft: 2.60 m (8 ft 6 in)
- Propulsion: 1 × 1,860 hp (1,390 kW) Werkspoor RUB 215 V12 diesel engine
- Speed: 15 knots (28 km/h; 17 mph)
- Range: 3,000 nmi (5,600 km; 3,500 mi) at 12 knots (22 km/h)
- Boats & landing craft carried: 2 × rigid-hulled inflatable boats; 1 × PAP 104 ROV
- Crew: 44
- Sensors & processing systems: 1 × DUBM 21B sonar
- Armament: 1 × 20 mm (0.79 in) machine gun

Melitopol (M312) (ex-HNLMS Vlaardingen (M863)) is a former minehunter of the Royal Netherlands Navy. Now in service with the Ukrainian Navy.

== History ==
=== Dutch service ===
Vlaardingen is the result of a cooperation between France, Belgium and The Netherlands. She is the fourteenth ship of the class in Dutch service and the third ship in the Dutch Navy to be named Vlaardingen. The commissioning ceremony took place in Alblasserdam on 15 March 1989.

The decommissioning ceremony took place in Vlaardingen on 27 March 2024.

=== Ukrainian service ===
Vlaardingen was pledged to the Ukrainian Navy in 2024 together with the Makkum following the Russian invasion of Ukraine. She was transferred in 2025 and renamed Melitopol. The ship can't travel to the Black Sea because of the Montreux Convention.
