= Latvian minehunter Visvaldis =

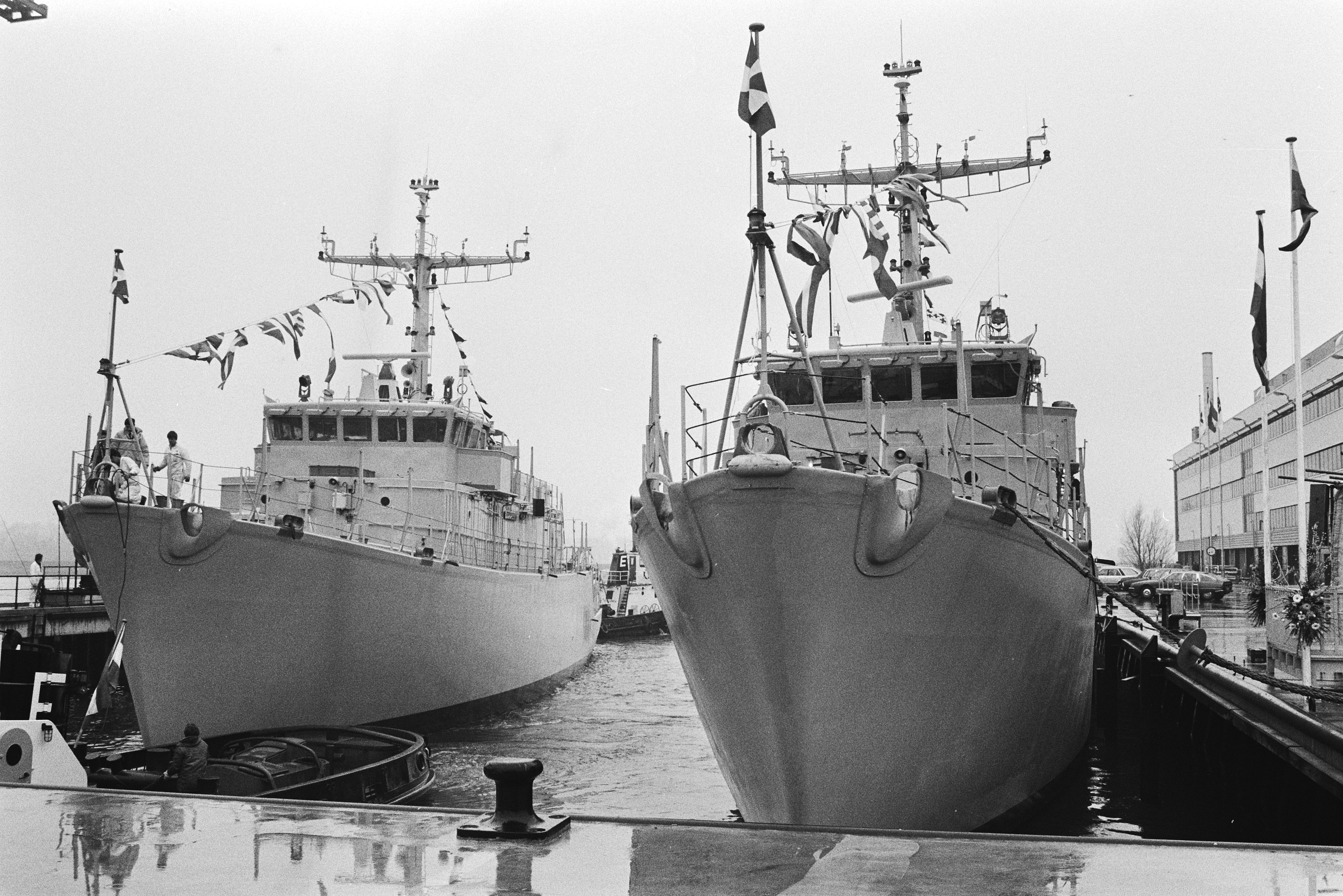
- Delfzijl on the right

History

Netherlands
- Name: Delfzijl
- Namesake: The city of Delfzijl
- Builder: Van der Giessen de Noord, Alblasserdam
- Laid down: 29 May 1980
- Launched: 30 October 1982
- Commissioned: 17 August 1983
- Decommissioned: 19 June 2000
- Identification: Hull number: M851
- Fate: Sold to the Latvian Navy

Latvia
- Name: Visvaldis
- Cost: €11.4 million (2007) (equivalent to €15.21 million in 2025)
- Acquired: 2007
- Commissioned: 2008
- Identification: Hull number: M-07
- Status: In active service

General characteristics
- Type: Alkmaar-class minehunter
- Displacement: 588 t (579 long tons) full load
- Length: 51.50 m (169 ft 0 in)
- Beam: 8.90 m (29 ft 2 in)
- Height: 18.5 m (60 ft 8 in)
- Draft: 2.60 m (8 ft 6 in)
- Propulsion: 1 × 1,860 hp (1,390 kW) Werkspoor RUB 215 V12 diesel engine
- Speed: 15 knots (28 km/h; 17 mph)
- Range: 3,000 nmi (5,600 km) at 12 knots (22 km/h)
- Boats & landing craft carried: 2 × rigid-hulled inflatable boats; 1 × PAP 104 ROV
- Crew: 44
- Sensors & processing systems: 1 × DUBM 21B sonar
- Armament: 1 × 20 mm (0.79 in) machine gun

Visvaldis (M-07) (ex-HNLMS Delfzijl (A851)) is a former minehunter of the Royal Netherlands Navy. Now in service with the Latvian Navy.

== History ==
Delfzijl is the result of a cooperation between France, Belgium and The Netherlands. She is the second ship of the Alkmaar-class minehunters. The commissioning ceremony took place in Alblasserdam on 17 August 1983.

Delfzijl was sold to the Latvian Navy in 2007 together with the Alkmaar, Dordrecht, Harlingen and Scheveningen. She was transferred in 2008 and renamed Visvaldis.
