= Latvian minehunter Tālivaldis =

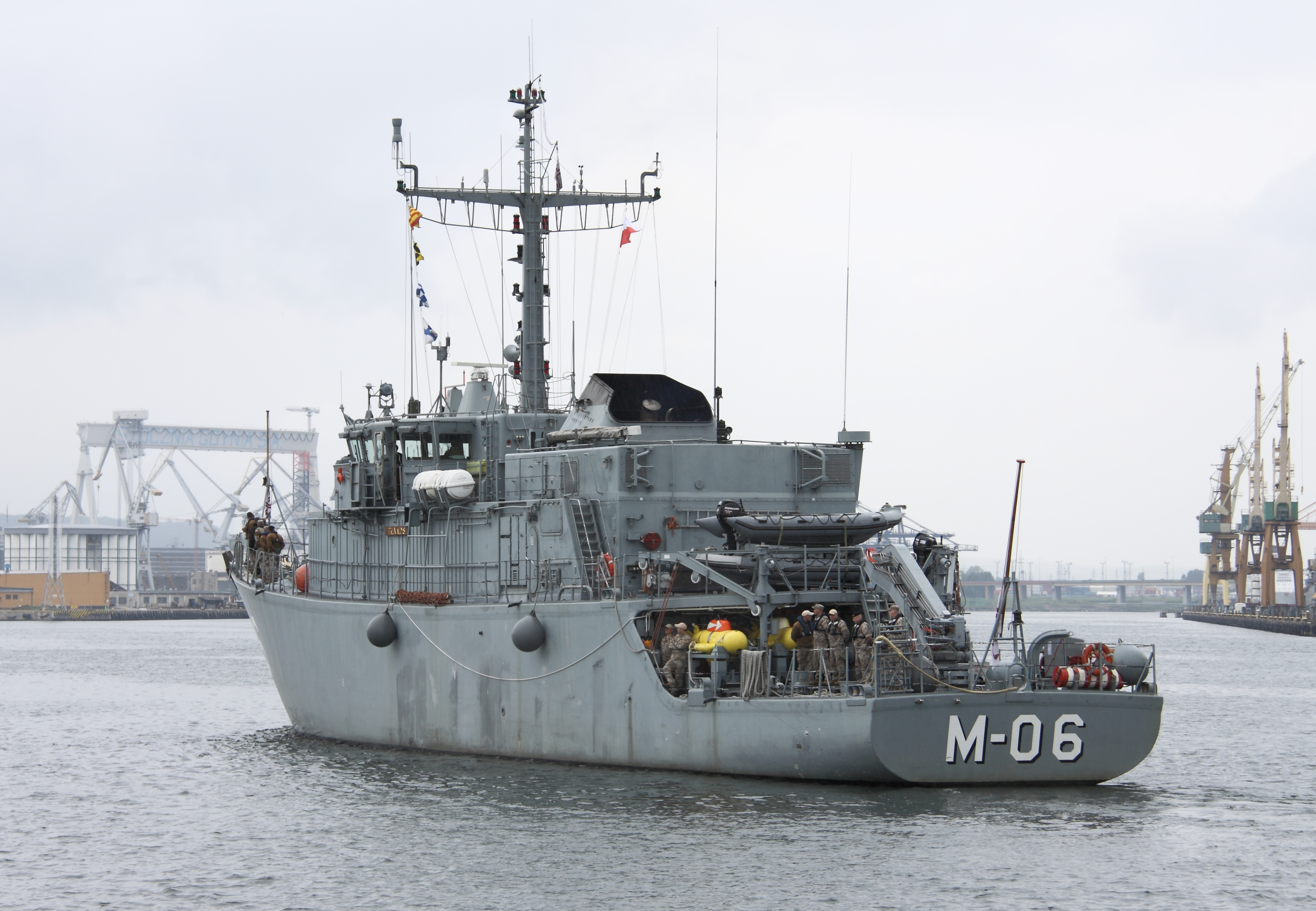

History

Netherlands
- Name: Dordrecht
- Namesake: The city of Dordrecht
- Builder: Van der Giessen de Noord, Alblasserdam
- Laid down: 5 January 1981
- Launched: 18 February 1983
- Commissioned: 16 November 1983
- Decommissioned: 5 July 2000
- Identification: Hull number: M852
- Fate: Sold to the Latvian Navy

Latvia
- Name: Tālivaldis
- Cost: €11.4 million (2007) (equivalent to €15.21 million in 2025)
- Acquired: 2007
- Commissioned: 2008
- Identification: Hull number: M-06
- Status: In active service

General characteristics
- Type: Alkmaar-class minehunter
- Displacement: 588 t (579 long tons) full load
- Length: 51.50 m (169 ft 0 in)
- Beam: 8.90 m (29 ft 2 in)
- Height: 18.5 m (60 ft 8 in)
- Draft: 2.60 m (8 ft 6 in)
- Propulsion: 1 × 1,860 hp (1,390 kW) Werkspoor RUB 215 V12 diesel engine
- Speed: 15 knots (28 km/h; 17 mph)
- Range: 3,000 nautical miles (5,600 km) at 12 knots (22 km/h)
- Boats & landing craft carried: 2 × rigid-hulled inflatable boats; 1 × PAP 104 ROV
- Crew: 44
- Sensors & processing systems: 1 × DUBM 21B sonar
- Armament: 1 × 20 mm (0.79 in) machine gun

Tālivaldis (M-06) (ex-HNLMS Dordrecht (A852)) is a former minehunter of the Royal Netherlands Navy. Now in service with the Latvian Navy.

== History ==
Dordrecht is the result of a cooperation between France, Belgium and The Netherlands. She is the third ship in the Alkmaar-class minehunters. The commissioning ceremony took place in Alblasserdam on 16 November 1983.

Dordrecht was sold to the Latvian Navy in 2007 together with Alkmaar, Delfzijl, Harlingen and Scheveningen. She was transferred in 2008 and renamed Tālivaldis.
