= Latvian minehunter Viesturs =

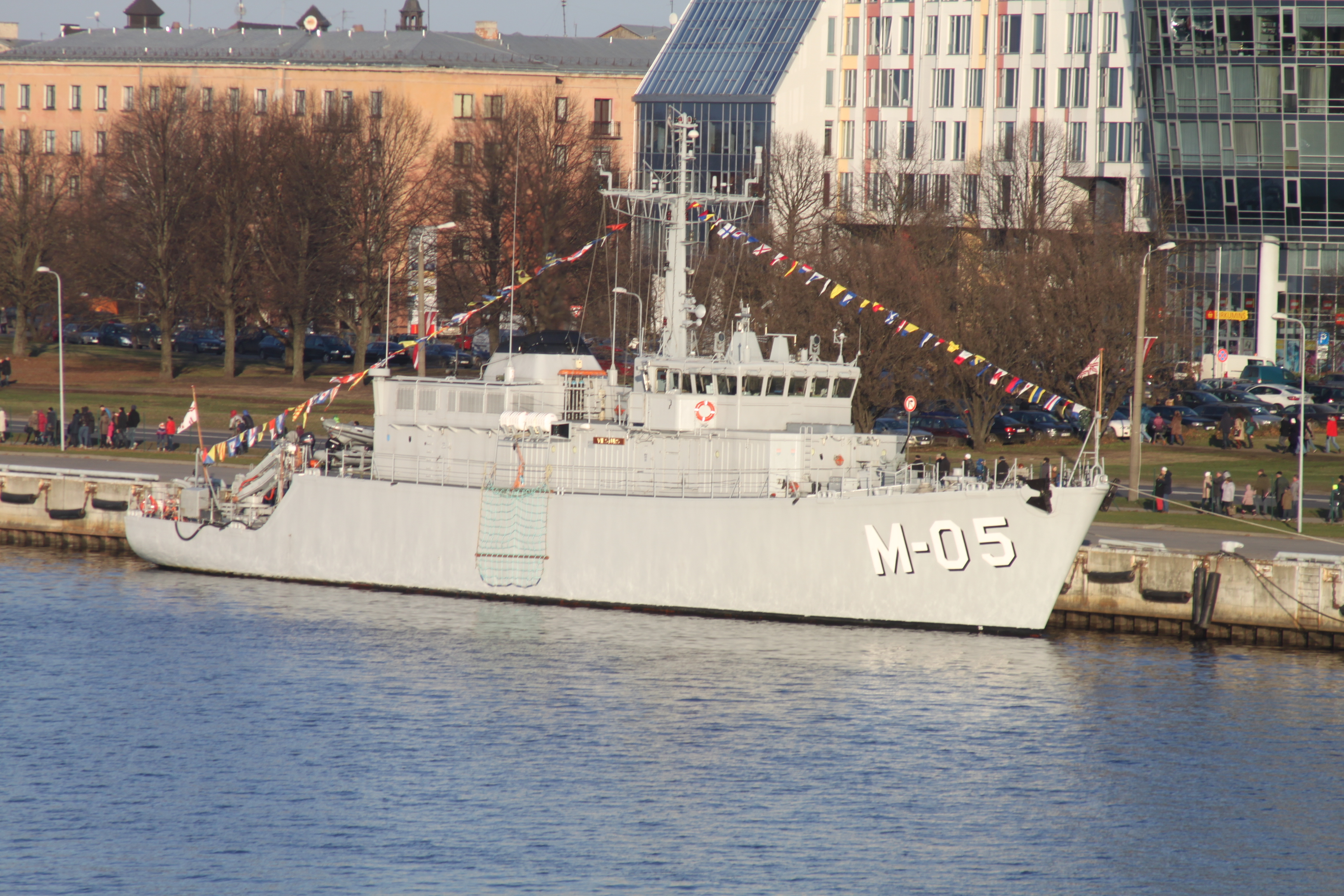

History

Netherlands
- Name: Scheveningen
- Namesake: The city of Scheveningen
- Builder: Van der Giessen de Noord, Alblasserdam
- Laid down: 24 May 1982
- Launched: 2 December 1983
- Commissioned: 18 July 1984
- Decommissioned: 1 January 2003
- Identification: Hull number: M855
- Fate: Sold to the Latvian Navy

Latvia
- Name: Viesturs
- Cost: €11.4 million (2007) (equivalent to €15.21 million in 2025)
- Acquired: 2007
- Commissioned: 2007
- Identification: Hull number: M-05
- Status: In active service

General characteristics
- Type: Alkmaar-class minehunter
- Displacement: 588 t (579 long tons) full load
- Length: 51.50 m (169 ft 0 in)
- Beam: 8.90 m (29 ft 2 in)
- Height: 18.5 m (60 ft 8 in)
- Draft: 2.60 m (8 ft 6 in)
- Propulsion: 1 × 1,860 hp (1,390 kW) Werkspoor RUB 215 V12 diesel engine
- Speed: 15 knots (28 km/h; 17 mph)
- Range: 3,000 nmi (5,600 km) at 12 knots (22 km/h)
- Boats & landing craft carried: 2 × rigid-hulled inflatable boats; 1 × PAP 104 ROV
- Crew: 44
- Sensors & processing systems: 1 × DUBM 21B sonar
- Armament: 1 × 20 mm (0.79 in) machine gun

Viesturs (M-05) (ex-HNLMS Scheveningen (A855)) is a former minehunter of the Royal Netherlands Navy that is now in service with the Latvian Navy.

== History ==
Scheveningen is the result of a cooperation between France, Belgium and The Netherlands. It is the sixth ship in the Alkmaar-class minehunters. The commissioning ceremony took place in Alblasserdam on 18 July 1984.

Scheveningen was sold to the Latvian Navy in 2007 together with Alkmaar, Delfzijl, Dordrecht and Harlingen. It was transferred in 2008 and renamed Viesturs.
