= Alkmaar-class minehunter =

Ship class of the Dutch navy

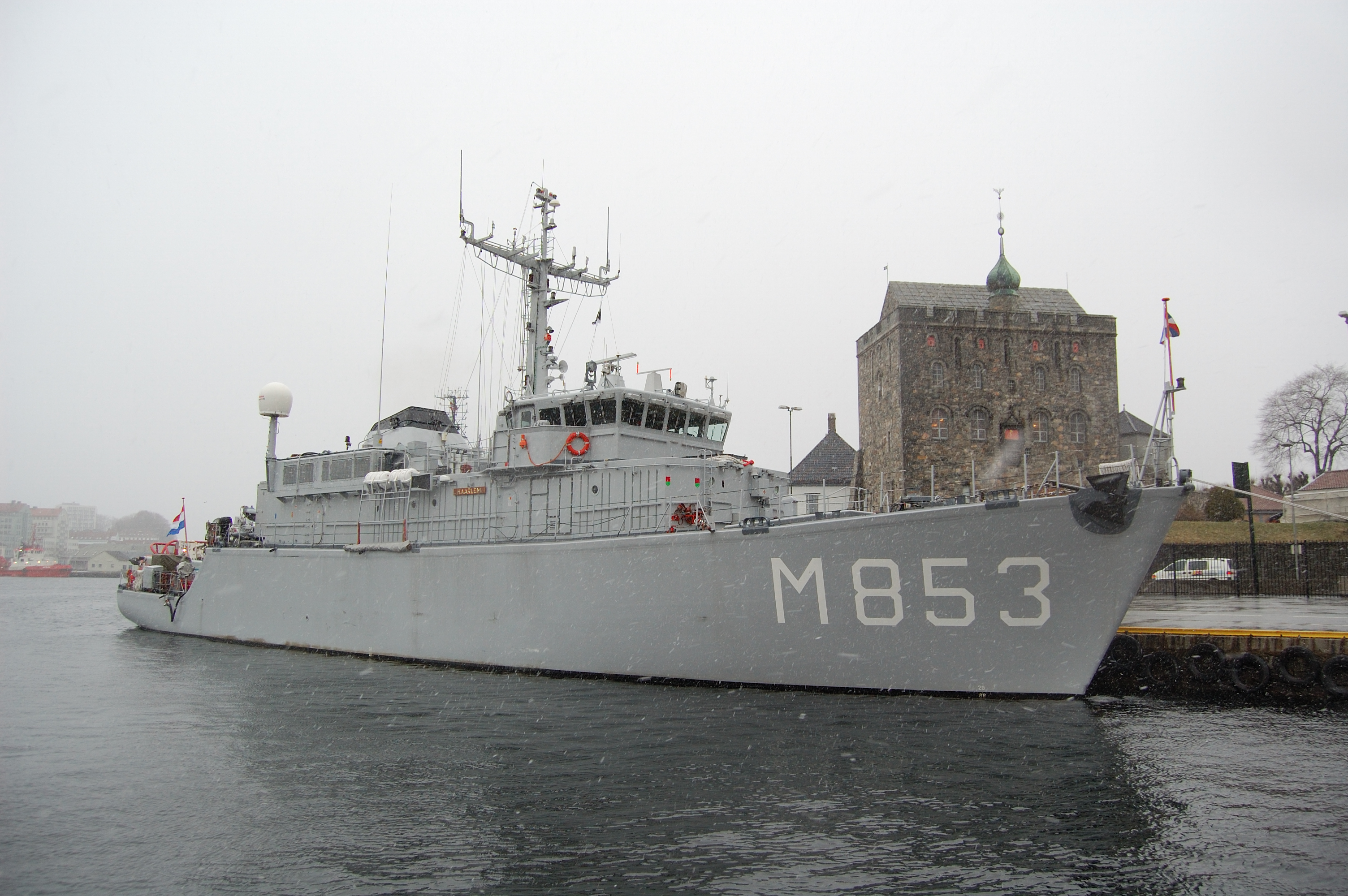
- Haarlem

Class overview
- Name: Alkmaar class
- Builders: Van der Giessen-De Noord, Alblasserdam
- Operators: Initial; Royal Netherlands Navy; Export; Bulgarian Navy; Latvian Naval Forces; Pakistan Navy; Ukrainian Navy
- Preceded by: Dokkum class
- Succeeded by: Vlissingen class
- Cost: 1.3 billion Dutch guilders
- Built: 1979–1989
- In commission: 1983–present
- Planned: 15
- Completed: 15
- Active: 14
- Laid up: 1

General characteristics
- Type: Minehunter
- Displacement: 510 t (500 long tons)
- Length: 49.10 m (161 ft 1 in)
- Beam: 8.90 m (29 ft 2 in)
- Draught: 2.45 m (8 ft 0 in)
- Propulsion: 2 screws; 1,400 kW (1,900 hp); Brons-Werkspoor A-RUB 215 V12 diesel engine; Bow thrusters
- Speed: 15 knots (28 km/h; 17 mph)
- Range: 3,000 nmi (5,600 km; 3,500 mi) at 12 knots (22 km/h; 14 mph)
- Boats & landing craft carried: 2 × PAP 104
- Crew: 22–34
- Sensors & processing systems: 1 × DUBM 21B sonar; 1 × Racal Decca 1229 radar; EVEC plotting system
- Armament: 1 × 20 mm gun

The Alkmaar class is a ship class of fifteen minehunters that were built in the Netherlands for the Royal Netherlands Navy. They are based on the design of the Tripartite class, which was developed by a collaborative effort between the Netherlands, Belgium and France, and replaced the minesweepers and minehunters of the Dokkum class.

== Design and construction ==
In 1975 the Netherlands, Belgium and France signed an agreement to develop a new mine countermeasures vessel together. At the same time it was also decided that each country would contribute to the construction by being responsible for certain components and systems. As a result, the Netherlands was responsible for the main propulsion, the gearboxes and propellers. France delivered the mine countermeasure and electronics systems, while Belgium build the remaining electronics and mechanic installations.

The construction of the Alkmaar class started in 1979 at the shipyard of Van der Giessen-De Noord in Alblasserdam. The ships were made from polyester, which required new construction methods in comparison to the previous mine countermeasure vessels that were built at the shipyard. As a result, Van der Giessen-De Noord invested 42 million Dutch guilders to build a new dedicated production hall that had a specific climate indoors and allowed serial construction in the same way as for aircraft production. Inside the production hall there was an assembly line that contained four stations, with each ship staying around 21 weeks at a station before moving to the next. Besides a new hall and tools, the shipyard also had to train personnel to be able to handle fiberglass and fiberglass sheets, which were used to construct the polyester ships. The construction of the 15 minehunters are estimated to have cost a total of 1.3 billion Dutch guilders.

=== Mine countermeasure systems ===
To hunt mines the Alkmaar class was equipped with the French DUBM 21B sonar, which was used to detect and classify mines, a Racal Decca 1229 radar and an EVEC plotting system. The sonar had a range of almost one kilometer and allowed the ship to search for mines up to a depth of 80 meters underwater. In addition, each ship was equipped with two Poisson Auto-Propulsé (PAP) type 104 submarine drones that were used for mine disposal. This PAP 104 wire guided drone had a television camera aboard for observation and could be fitted out with explosives to destroy mines from a safe distance.

=== Armament ===
The Alkmaar class had as armament a single 20 mm machine gun.

=== Propulsion ===
The minehunters of the Alkmaar class are equipped with a Brons-Werkspoor A-RUB 215 V12 diesel engine that can produce 1900 bhp. This non magnetic diesel engine was produced by Brons-Industrie and a development of the earlier Werkspoor RUB 215 diesel engine. The Brons-Werkspoor A-RUB 215 V12 diesel engine can drive the two active screws of the minehunters to a maximum speed of 15 knots. Besides the two screws, the minehunters also have bow thrusters.

== Service history ==
Between 1987 and 1989 Maassluis, Hellevoetsluis and Urk were active in the Persian Gulf as part of a Western European Union (WEU) mine clearing operation and placed under Belgian command.

In 1990 Alkmaar and Zierikzee took part in the exercise Safe Pass at the west coast of America.

In 2024 Willemstad, Makkum and Zierikzee took part in BALTOPS alongside other naval ships of the Royal Netherlands Navy.

== Ships in class ==
The ships of the Alkmaar class are named after medium-sized Dutch municipalities that played a role in the Eighty Years' War and can also be accessed by these ships.

Alkmaar class construction data
Pennant no.	Name	Builder	Laid down	Launched	Commissioned	Decommissioned	Fate
M 850	Alkmaar	Van der Giessen-De Noord; Alblasserdam, Netherlands	30 January 1979	2 May 1982	28 May 1983	2000	Sold to Latvia in 2005
M 851	Delfzijl	Van der Giessen-De Noord; Alblasserdam, Netherlands	29 May 1980	30 October 1982	17 August 1983	2000	Sold to Latvia in 2005
M 852	Dordrecht	Van der Giessen-De Noord; Alblasserdam, Netherlands	5 January 1981	18 February 1983	16 November 1983	2000	Sold to Latvia in 2005
M 853	Haarlem	Van der Giessen-De Noord; Alblasserdam, Netherlands	16 June 1981	6 May 1983	12 January 1984	2011	Sold to Pakistan in June 2021
M 854	Harlingen	Van der Giessen-De Noord; Alblasserdam, Netherlands	30 November 1981	1 July 1983	12 April 1984	2000	Sold to Latvia in 2005
M 855	Scheveningen	Van der Giessen-De Noord; Alblasserdam, Netherlands	24 May 1982	2 December 1983	18 July 1984	2002	Sold to Latvia in 2005
M 856	Maassluis	Van der Giessen-De Noord; Alblasserdam, Netherlands	7 November 1982	27 April 1984	12 December 1984	2011	Sold to Bulgaria in 2019
M 857	Makkum	Van der Giessen-De Noord; Alblasserdam, Netherlands	28 February 1983	27 September 1984	8 May 1985	25 November 2024	Pledged to Ukraine in 2024, donated to Ukraine in 2025, renamed Henichesk
M 858	Middelburg	Van der Giessen-De Noord; Alblasserdam, Netherlands	11 July 1983	18 February 1985	10 December 1986	2011	Sold to Pakistan in June 2021
M 859	Hellevoetsluis	Van der Giessen-De Noord; Alblasserdam, Netherlands	12 December 1983	18 July 1985	20 February 1987	2011	Sold to Bulgaria in 2019
M 860	Schiedam	Van der Giessen-De Noord; Alblasserdam, Netherlands	7 May 1984	12 December 1985	9 July 1986		To be donated to Bulgaria 2027-2028
M 861	Urk	Van der Giessen-De Noord; Alblasserdam, Netherlands	1 October 1984	2 May 1986	10 December 1986	22 June 2022	
M 862	Zierikzee	Van der Giessen-De Noord; Alblasserdam, Netherlands	25 February 1985	1 October 1986	7 May 1987		To be donated to Bulgaria 2027-2028
M 863	Vlaardingen	Van der Giessen-De Noord; Alblasserdam, Netherlands	5 May 1986	6 August 1988	15 March 1989	27 March 2024	Pledged to Ukraine in 2024, donated to Ukraine in 2025, renamed Melitopol
M 864	Willemstad	Van der Giessen-De Noord; Alblasserdam, Netherlands	6 October 1986	27 January 1989	20 September 1989		To be donated to Bulgaria 2027-2028

== Export ==
=== Bulgaria ===
In 2019 two Alkmaar-class minehunters, Maassluis and Hellevoetsluis, were sold to Bulgaria for a total amount of 1.996 million euro excluding VAT. These minehunters had previously been taken out of service in 2011 as a result of austerity measures.

On 15 September 2025 it was announced by the Dutch State Secretary of Defence that another three Alkmaar-class minehunters will be transferred to the Bulgarian Navy. The three minehunters that will be handed over will include Willemstad, Schiedam and Zierikzee. A year later, in July 2026, the Netherlands, Belgium and Bulgaria signed a Memorandum of Understanding to transfer seven minehunters to Bulgaria, which included the three previously announced Alkmaar class minehunters.

=== Latvia ===
In July 2005 it was announced that Latvia will buy five Alkmaar-class minehunters from the Royal Netherlands Navy for 57 million euro. The minehunters that will be sold consisted of the Alkmaar, Delfzijl, Dordrecht, Harlingen and Scheveningen. All five had already been withdrawn from service in the RNLN at the time of their sale, with the first three having been withdrawn in 2000, while the latter two had been withdrawn in 2003. The minehunters will be overhauled before being handed over to the Latvian Navy within the next three years.

Harlingen was the first minehunter to be handed over to the Latvian Navy on 6 March 2007 and subsequently renamed Imanta. She was followed by Scheveningen on 5 September 2007, which was renamed Viesters. Dordrecht was handed over in January 2008 and renamed Tālivaldis. A few months later, in October 2008, Delfzijn was transferred and renamed Visvaldis. In June 2009 the last minehunter, Alkmaar, was handed over and renamed Rūsiņš. While Rūsiņš was handed over in June 2009, she entered Latvian service in 2011.

=== Ukraine ===
In March 2023 it was reported that the Netherlands would donate two Alkmaar-class minehunters to Ukraine. The transfer of these ships would most likely start from 2025.

In June 2025 Vlaardingen was donated to the Ukrainian Navy and renamed Melitopol. A second Alkmaar-class minehunter, HNLMS Makkum was donated to Ukrainian Navy later and was renamed to Henichesk.

== See also ==
Equivalent minehunters of the same era

- Avenger class
- Sandown class
- Frankenthal class
- Landsort class
- Type 082
- Lerici class
