= Rupelmonde =

Town in East Flanders, Belgium

- Village
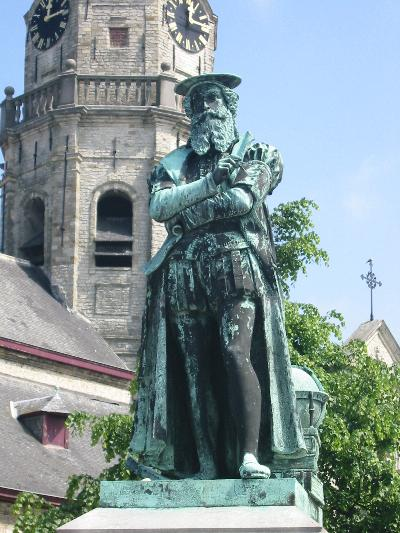
- Mercator statue in Rupelmonde

- Location in Belgium
- Coordinates: 51°07′34″N 4°17′27″E
- Country: Belgium
- Region: Flemish Region
- Province: East Flanders
- Municipality: Kruibeke

Area
  - Total: 1.89 km^{2} (0.73 sq mi)

Population (2021)
  - Total: 3,065
  - Density: 1,620/km^{2} (4,200/sq mi)
- Time zone: CET

Rupelmonde is a village in the municipality of Kruibeke, in the Belgian province of East Flanders. It is located on the banks of the river Schelde opposite the confluence with the eponymous Rupel, and is known for its sundials as well as having what is probably Belgium's only tidemill. It is the birthplace of Gerardus Mercator, (1512–1594) the Flemish cartographer, who was imprisoned for several months in the castle there, a remnant of which today serves as a museum.

The town holds a procession of civic giants on the first Sunday of August each year.

== Gallery ==
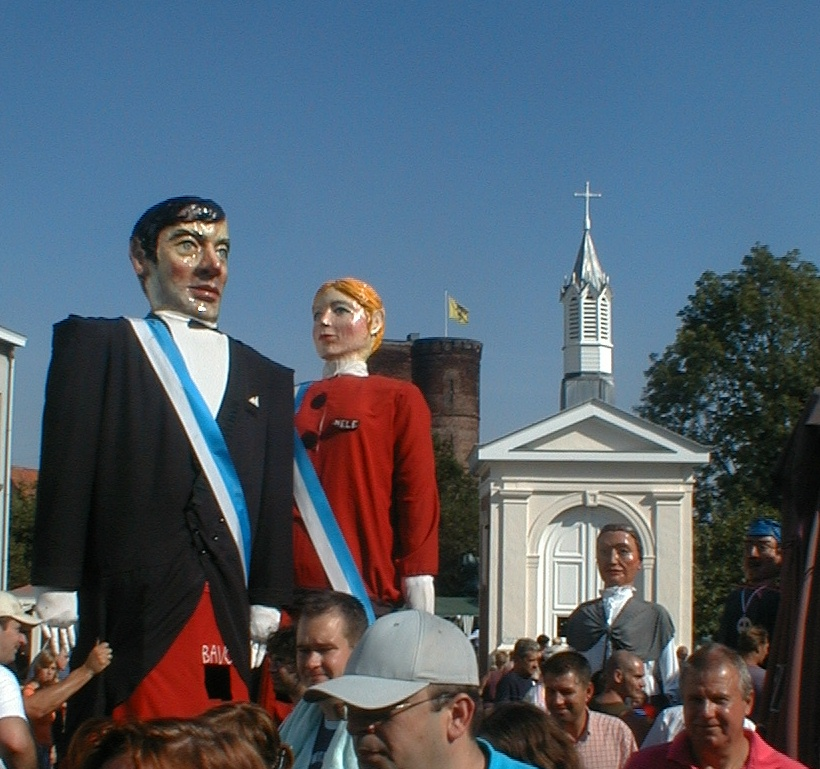
Giants Bavo and Nele visiting Rupelmonde from nearby Moerzeke

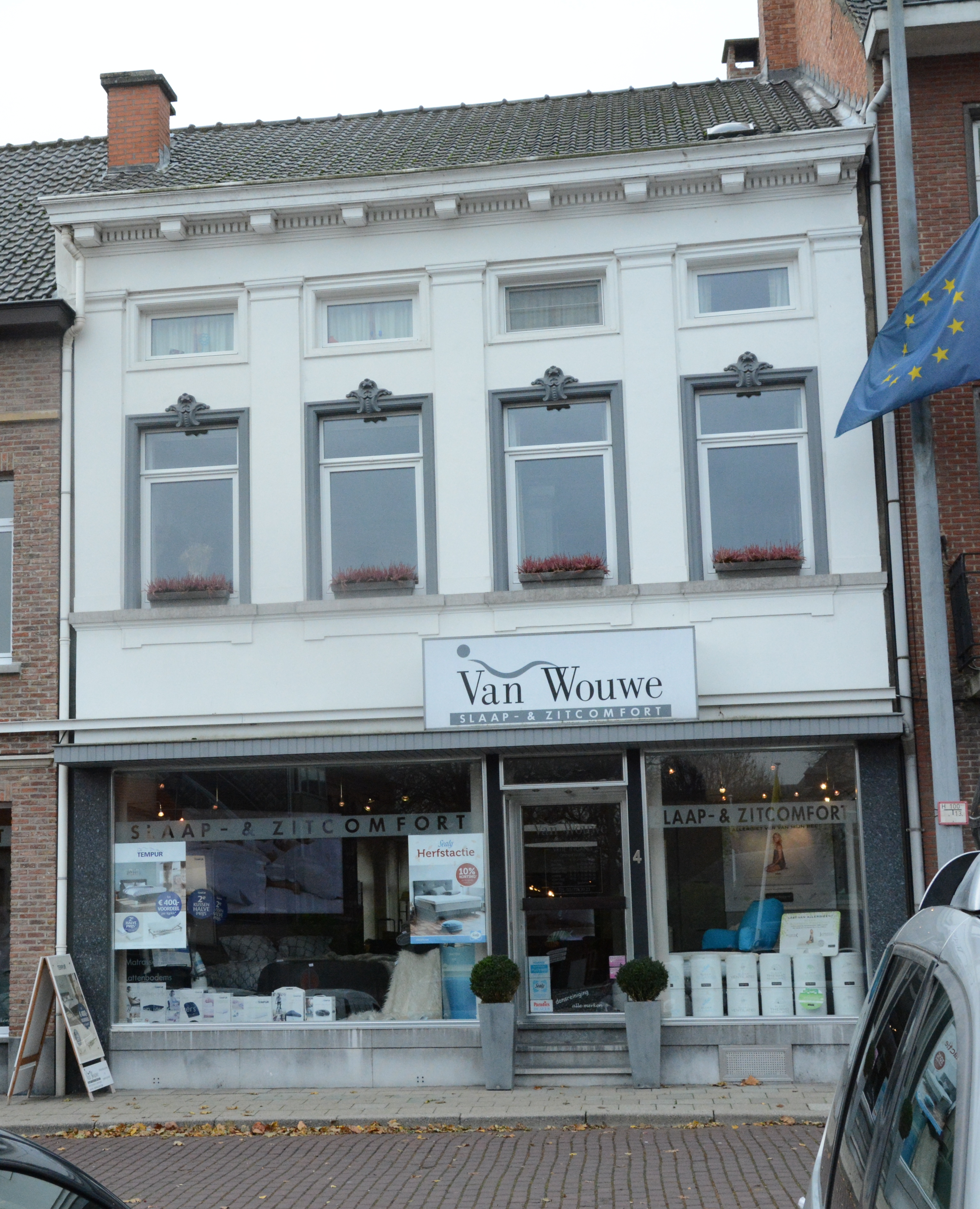
Shop in Rupelmonde

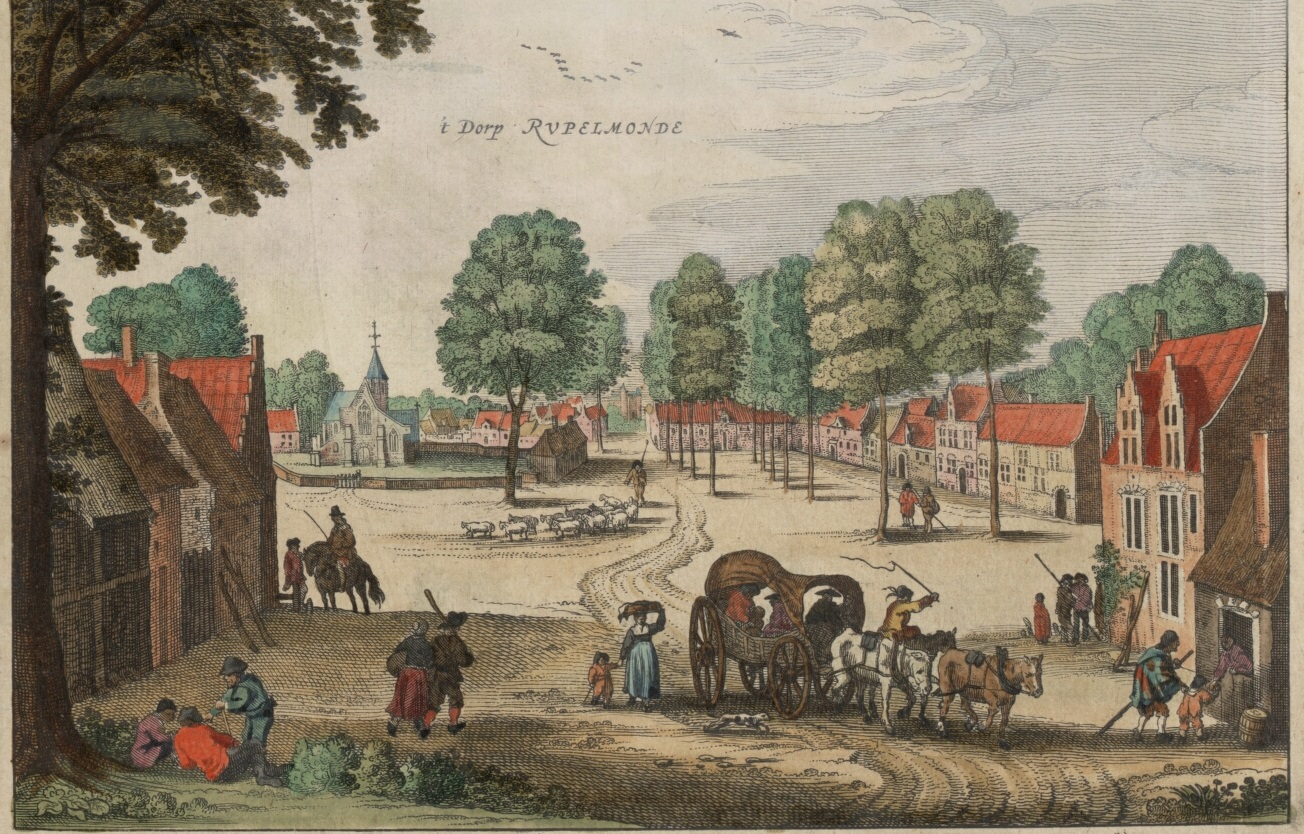
Drawing of Rupelmonde (1641)

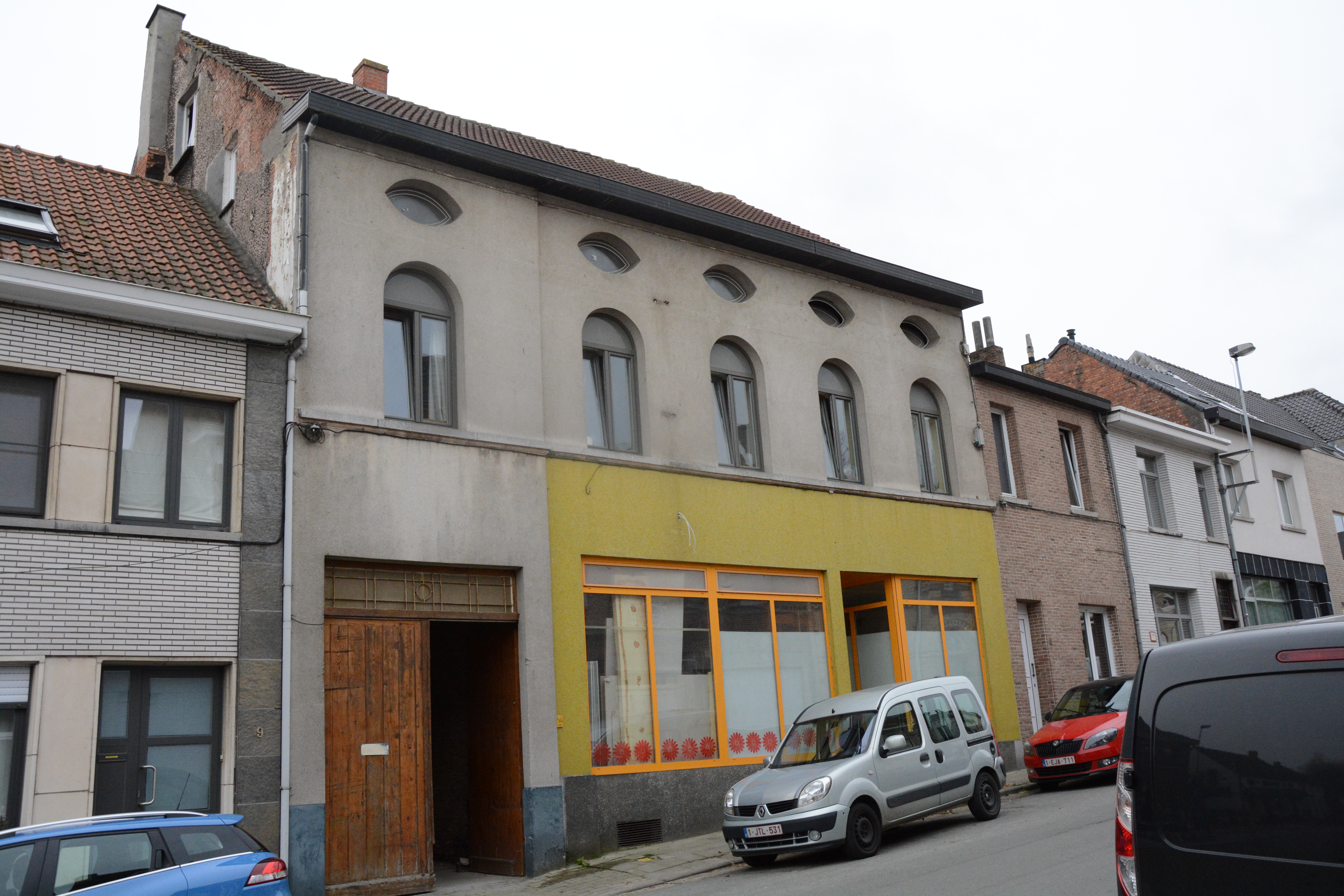
House in Rupelmonde
