= Latvian minehunter Imanta =

Naval ship built in 1984

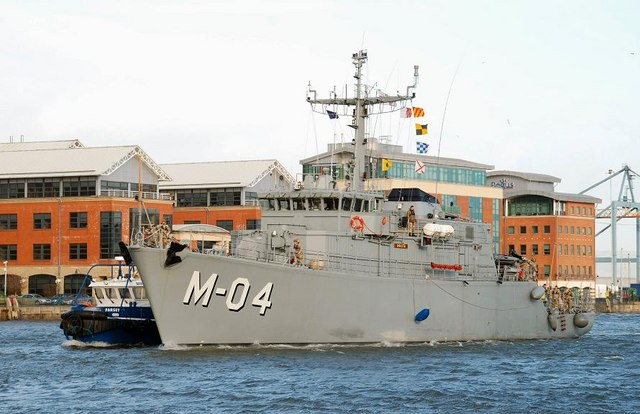
- Imanta in Belfast

History

Netherlands
- Name: Harlingen
- Launched: 1984
- Fate: Sold to Latvia, 2005

Latvia
- Name: Imanta
- Acquired: 2005
- Identification: MMSI number: 275336000; Callsign: YLNV
- Status: in active service, as of 2019

General characteristics (in Dutch service)
- Class & type: Tripartite-class minehunter
- Displacement: 536 t (528 long tons) empty; 605 t (595 long tons) full load
- Length: 51.5 m (169 ft)
- Beam: 8.96 m (29.4 ft)
- Height: 18.5 m (61 ft)
- Draught: 3.6 m (12 ft)
- Propulsion: 1 × 1370 kW Werkspoor RUB 215 V12 diesel engine; 2 × 180 kW ACEC active rudders; 1 × HOLEC bow propeller
- Speed: 15 knots (28 km/h)
- Range: 3,000 nautical miles (5,600 km) at 12 knots (22 km/h)
- Boats & landing craft carried: 2 × rigid-hulled inflatable boats; 1 × PAP 104 ROV
- Complement: 4 officers, 15 non-commissioned officers, 17 sailors
- Sensors & processing systems: 1 × DUBM 21B sonar
- Armament: 1 × 20 mm modèle F2 gun

Imanta (M-04) is the lead ship of the Tripartite class of minehunters for the Latvian Naval Forces. The vessel was formerly HNLMS Harlingen (M854), a Tripartite-class minehunter of the Royal Netherlands Navy built in 1984. Alkmaar and Imanta are, respectively, the Dutch and Latvian navies' names of the Tripartite class of minehunters, developed jointly by France, Belgium, and the Netherlands.

Harlingen was one of five minehunters sold to Latvia by the Netherlands in 2005 for approximately €11.4 million each. An investigation into possible corruption related to the vessels' acquisition was revealed in August 2009, when it was announced that the vessels were purchased without any instruction manuals or technical documents. It took Latvian officials over a year to acquire the necessary technical materials from France, at the cost of an additional €580,000.

Since 2009 Imanta has been active service with the Latvian Naval Forces and available for NATO operations.
