= Landing craft utility =

Type of boat designed for transporting amphibious forces and cargo to shore

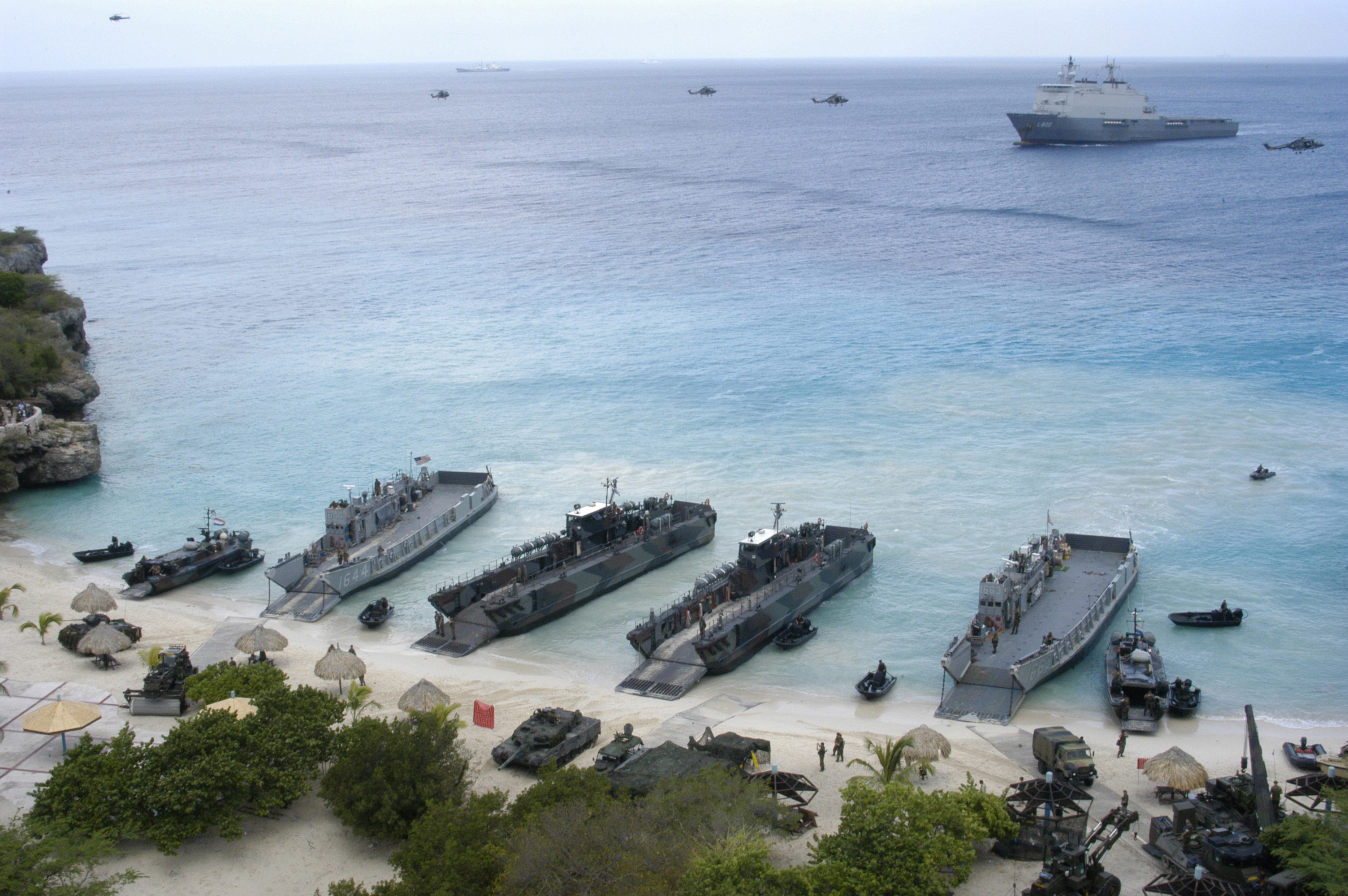
Dutch and American LCUs in Curaçao, June 2006.

A landing craft utility (LCU) is a type of boat used by amphibious forces to transport equipment and troops to the shore. They are capable of transporting tracked or wheeled vehicles and troops from amphibious assault ships to beachheads or piers.

== Colombia ==
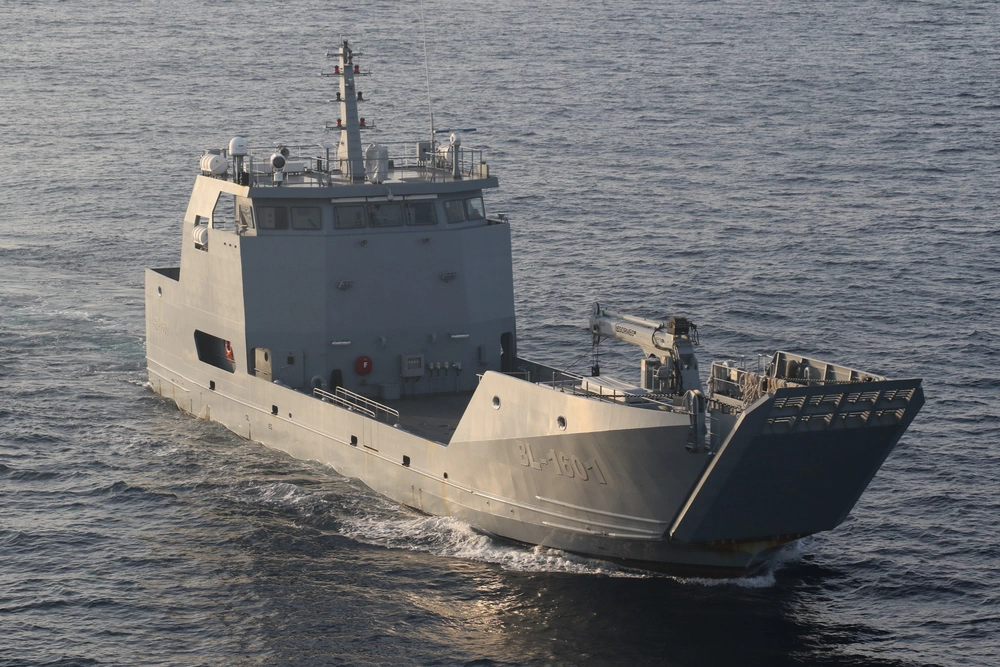
- Quetzal (BL-1601) of the Guatemalan Navy

Class overview
- Name: Golfo de Tribugá class
- Builders: COTECMAR
- Operators: Colombian National Navy; Guatemalan Navy; Honduran Navy
- In service: 2014–present
- In commission: 2014–present
- Completed: 8
- Active: 8

General characteristics
- Type: Landing craft utility
- Displacement: 574.6 t (565.5 long tons)
- Length: 49.0 m (160.8 ft)
- Beam: 11.0 m (36.1 ft)
- Draught: 1.5 m (4 ft 11 in)
- Propulsion: 2 × Caterpillar C18 diesel motors, 412 kW (553 shp)
- Speed: 8.5 knots (15.7 km/h; 9.8 mph)
- Range: 1,500 nmi (2,800 km) at 8.5 kn (15.7 km/h); 2,500 nmi (4,600 km) at 6 kn (11 km/h)
- Endurance: 20 days with 51 crew.; 40 days with 15 crew.
- Capacity: 120 t (130 short tons)
- Troops: 36
- Complement: 15 (3 officers)

The Golfo de Tribugá-class landing craft is an LCU developed by COTECMAR for the Colombian National Navy. The vessel class is also known as BDA (Spanish: Buque de Desembarco Anfibio) and an unarmored version for logistical and humanitarian services has also been developed, known as BALC (Spanish: Buque de Apoyo Logístico y Cabotaje).

=== Operators ===
- Colombia
  - Colombian National Navy: 6 in service
    - ARC Golfo de Urabá
    - ARC Golfo de Tribugá
    - ARC Bahía Málaga
    - ARC Golfo de Morrosquillo
    - ARC Bahía Colombia
    - ARC Bahía Solano
  - UNGRD: 1 on order for civil service use
- Guatemalan Navy: 1 in service
- Honduran Navy: 2 in service

== France ==
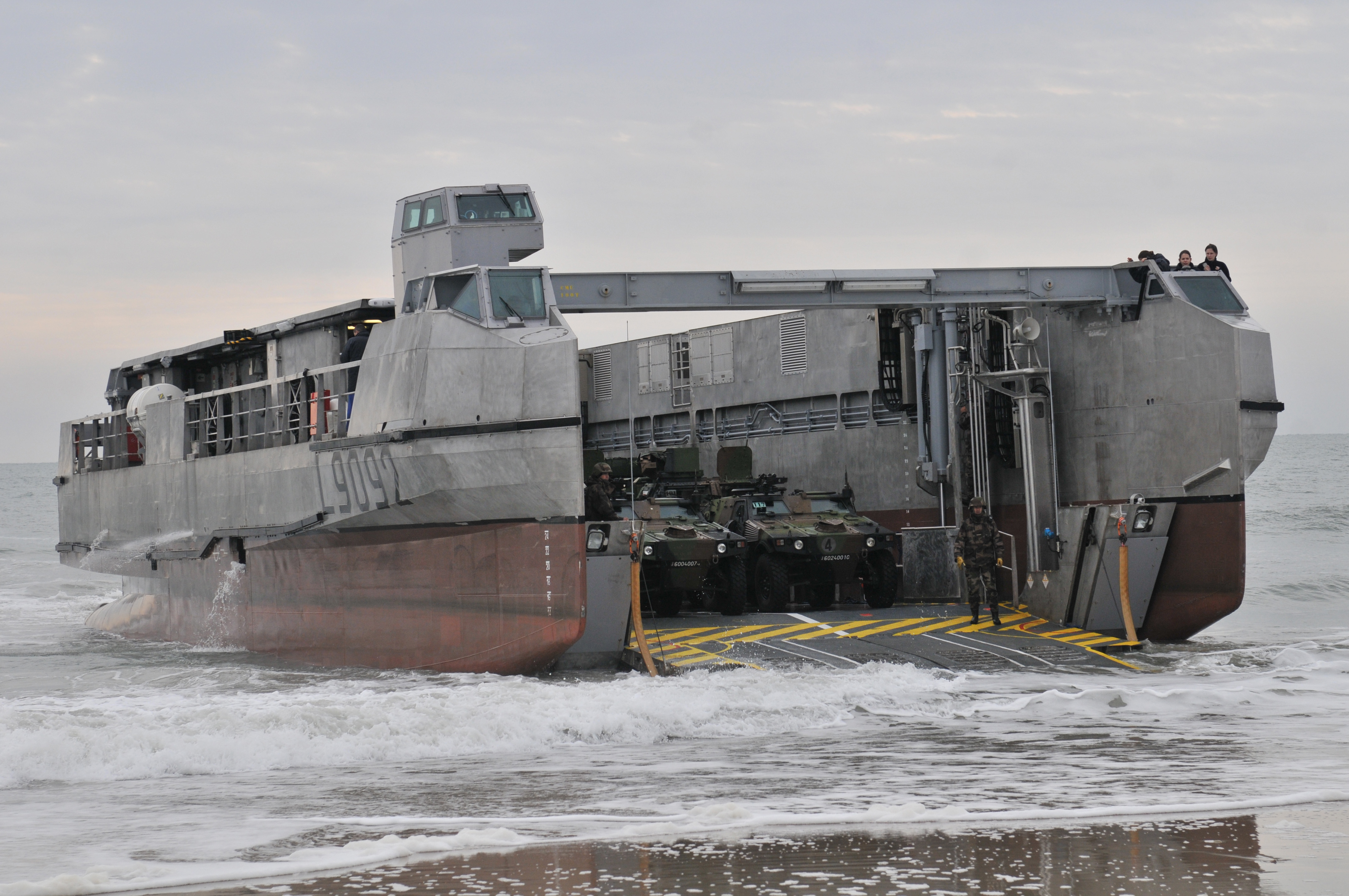
One EDA-R, Bold Alligator 2012.

The Engin de débarquement amphibie rapide (EDA-R) landing catamaran or L-CAT, entered service in January 2011. They can carry a main battle tank like other European LCUs but are capable of much higher speeds, up to 30 knots (56 km/h; 35 mph).

== Germany ==
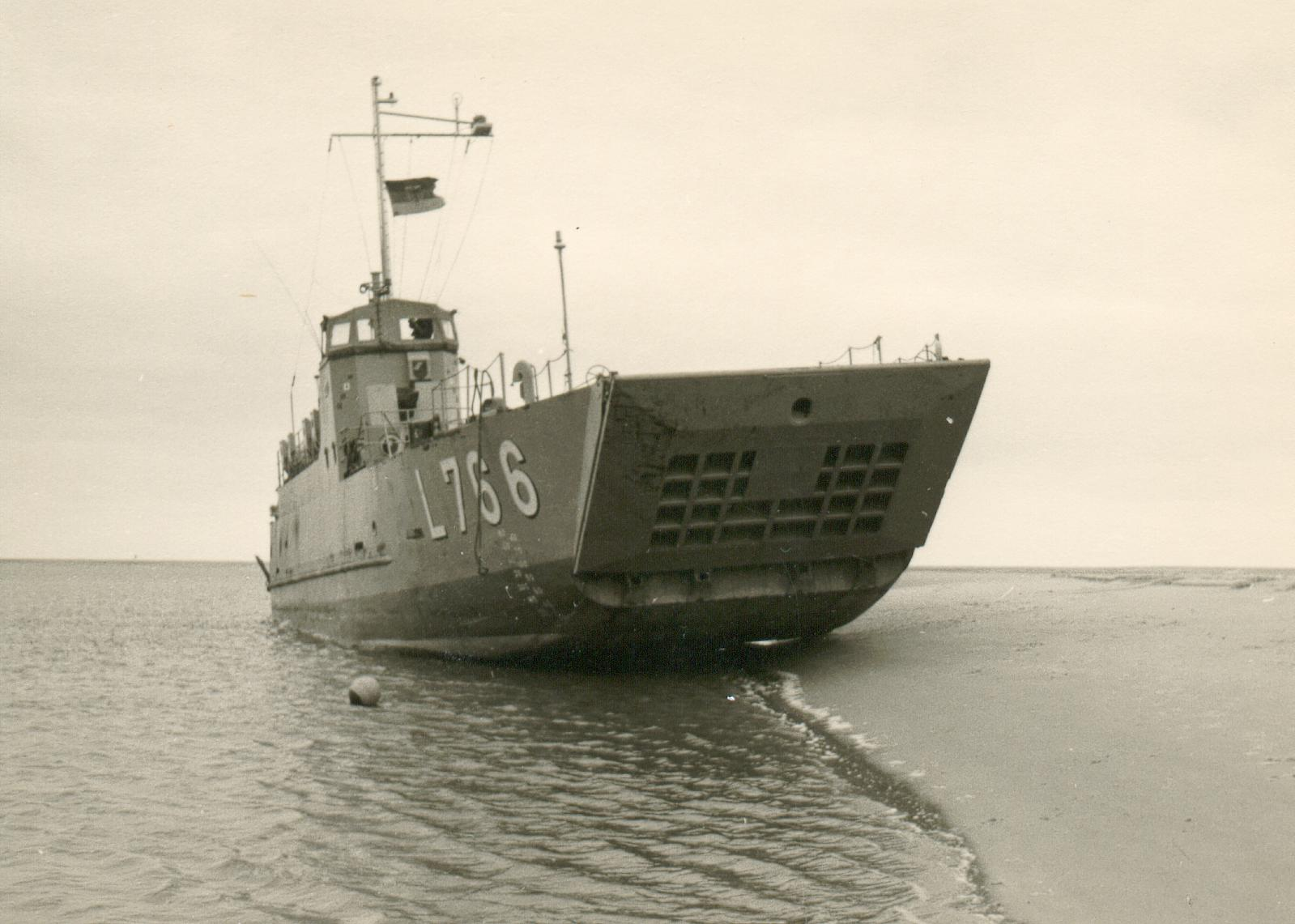
- Stör

Class overview
- Operators: German Navy; Hellenic Navy; Yemeni Navy
- In service: 1965–
- Completed: 22
- Active: 2
- Laid up: 3

General characteristics
- Type: Landing craft
- Displacement: 430 tonnes (420 long tons) (full load)
- Length: 40 m (131 ft 3 in)
- Beam: 8.8 m (28 ft 10 in)
- Draft: 2.1 m (6 ft 11 in)
- Propulsion: 750 kW (1,010 hp)
- Speed: 11 knots (20 km/h; 13 mph)
- Capacity: Up to 150 tonnes (150 long tons)
- Complement: 17
- Armament: 1 or 2 × Rheinmetall MK 20 Rh 202 20 mm (0.79 in) autocannon; Mine laying capability

Germany has two Barbe-class utility landing craft (Type 520), dating from the mid-1960s, which remain in service under the SEK-M Naval Special Forces' command. Five Barbe landing crafts were transferred to Greece at the end of the Cold War.

== India ==
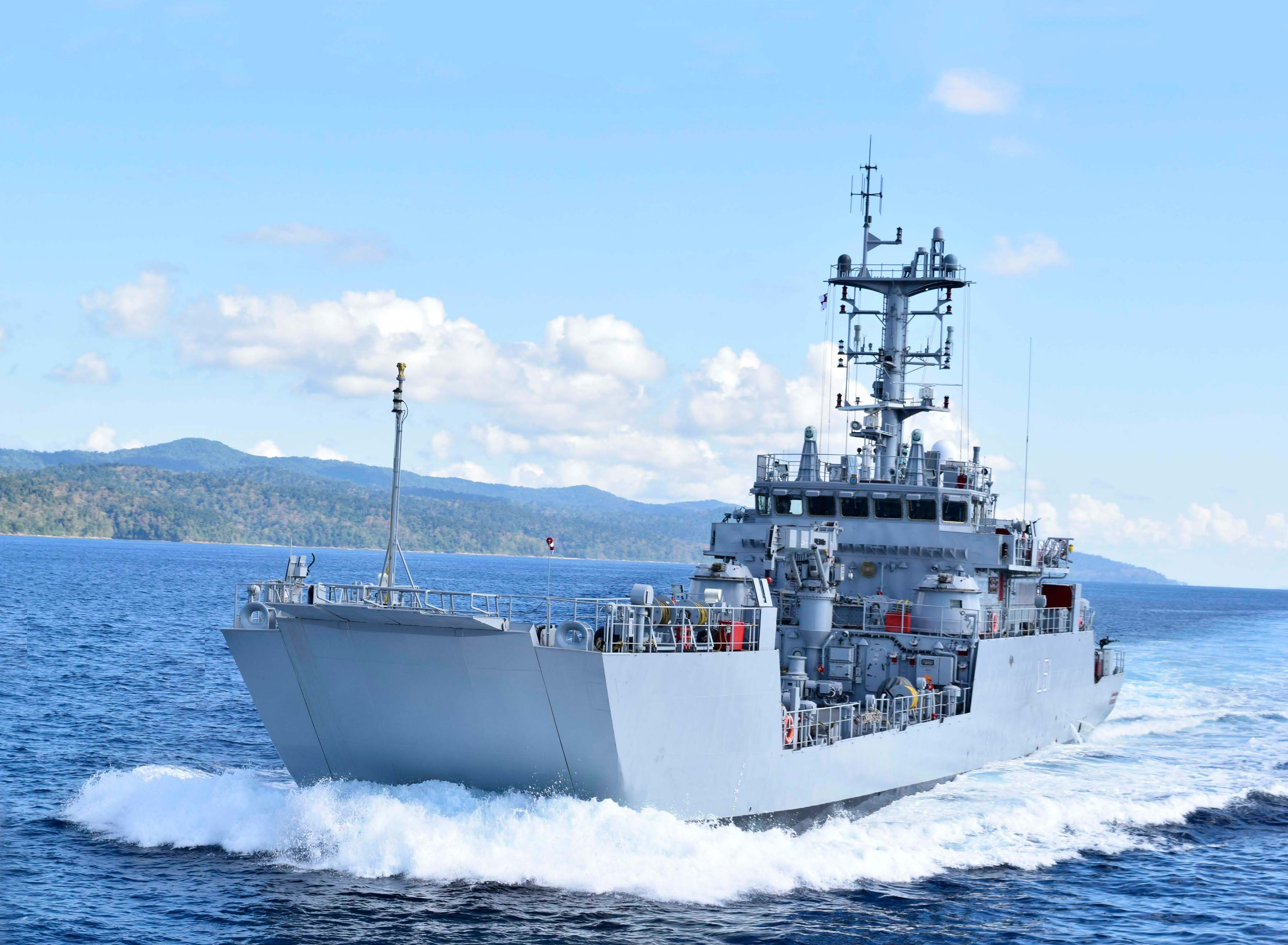
- MK.IV LCU (L51) at sea.

Class overview
- Name: LCU MK IV class
- Builders: GRSE
- Operators: Indian Navy
- Preceded by: Mk. III LCU
- Cost: ₹2,100 crore (equivalent to ₹43 billion or US$510 million in 2023)
- Built: 2011-20
- Planned: 8
- Completed: 8
- Active: 8

General characteristics
- Type: Landing craft utility
- Displacement: 830 t (910 tons) standard; 1,001 t (1,103 tons) full load
- Length: 62.8 m (206 ft)
- Beam: 11 m (36 ft)
- Draught: 2.2 m (7 ft 3 in)
- Installed power: 1,840 kW (2,470 hp) each
- Propulsion: 2 × MTU 16V 4000 M53 diesel engines; Fixed-pitch propellers
- Speed: 15 kn (28 km/h)
- Range: 1,500 nmi (2,800 km) at 12 kn (22 km/h)
- Troops: 160
- Complement: 56
- Sensors & processing systems: SATCOM - LINK II Mod 1 tactical datalink; Sanket S passive electronic warfare system; ELK 7036 communications intelligence (COMINT) system; MiniPOP surveillance system
- Armament: 2 × 30 mm CRN 91 naval gun; 12.7 mm heavy machine guns; 7.62 mm machine guns; Igla man-portable surface-to-air missiles

India currently has 8 Mk IV class LCU. Last MK IV class of LCU was delivered by GRSE in 2020.

== Netherlands ==
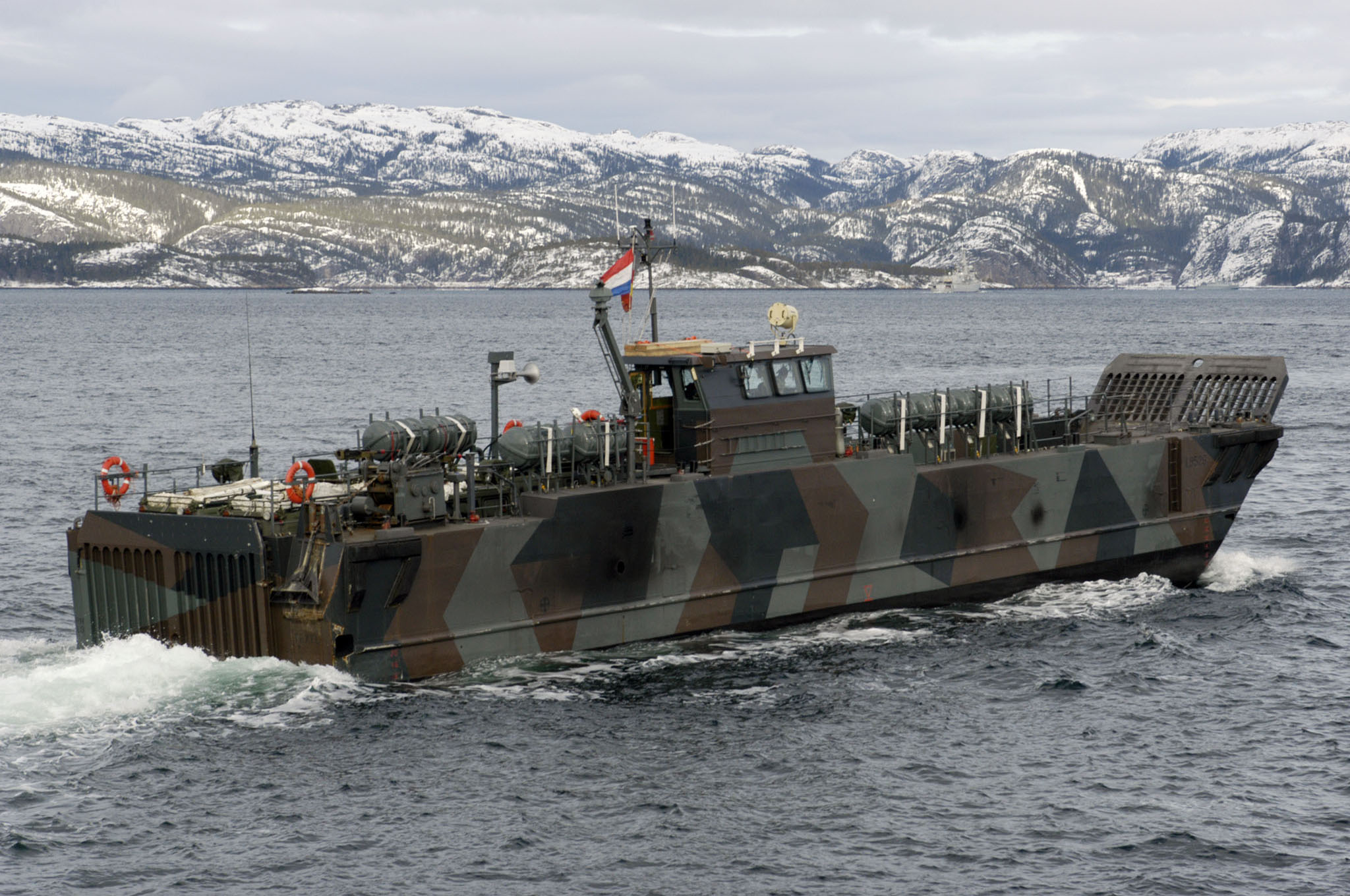
- NL LCU MK2

Class overview
- Name: LCU Mk.II (NL) class
- Operators: Royal Netherlands Navy, Netherlands Marine Corps
- Active: 5

General characteristics
- Type: Ro-Ro landing craft
- Displacement: 255 tonnes (251 long tons)
- Length: 36.3 m (119 ft 1 in)
- Beam: 6.85 m (22 ft 6 in)
- Draft: 0.85 m (2 ft 9 in) forward, full load; 1.4 m (4 ft 7 in) aft, full load
- Capacity: 65 tonnes (64 long tons)
- Complement: 7
- Armament: 2 × Browning .50 calibre (12.7 mm) machine guns

With the launch of the amphibious transport ship HNLMS Rotterdam in 1998 there was a need for LCUs. The Dutch LCUs are similar to the British LCU Mk.10 with the bridge being set to one side allowing for a roll-on roll-off design. Until 2005 the Netherlands Marine Corps used the LCU Mark I (NL).

In 2005 and 2006 the five vessels were modernized to the type Mark II. The vessels have been stretched by 9 meters to decrease their draft, which increased their load carrying capacity by 20 tons and allows them to come closer to shore. In addition they were fitted with a strengthened bow ramp, and they can now accommodate the Royal Netherlands Army Leopard 2 A6 main battle tank. Because of the lengthening of the Mark II, the Rotterdam can take two LCUs (plus three LCVPs) in its dock. The dock of Rotterdam's sister ship, HNLMS Johan de Witt, has the capacity to transport two LCUs, but carries four LCVPs in davits.

== Russia ==
=== Dyugon ===
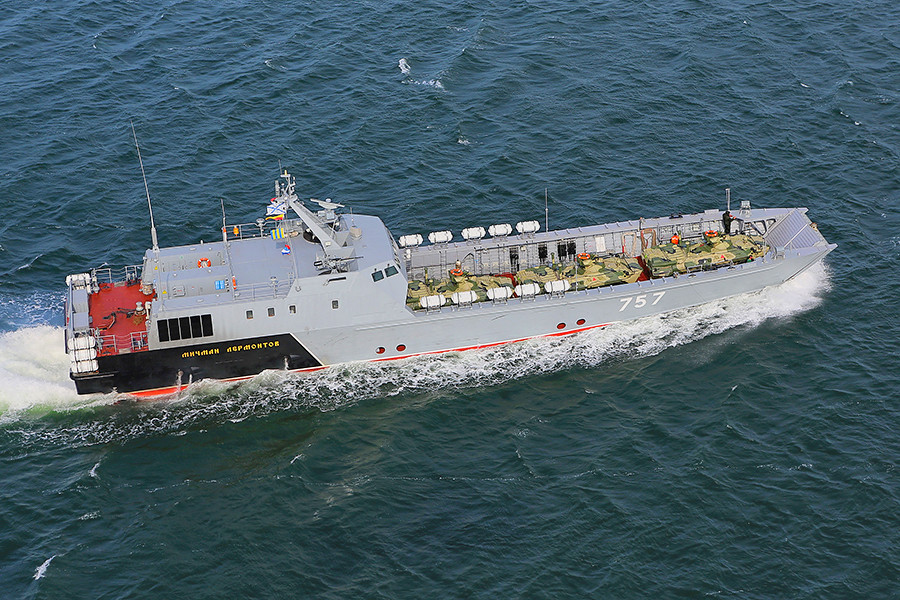
- Dyugon-class landing craft

Class overview
- Name: Dyugon-class landing craft
- Operators: Russian Navy
- Completed: 5
- Active: 5

General characteristics
- Displacement: 280 tonnes (276 long tons)
- Length: 45 m (148 ft)
- Beam: 8.6 m (28 ft)
- Height: 5.1 m (17 ft)
- Draft: 1.9 m (6.2 ft)
- Propulsion: Two M507A-2D diesel engines with 9000 hp each
- Speed: 35 knots (65 km/h; 40 mph)
- Range: 500 nmi (930 km)
- Capacity: 120–140 tonnes (132–154 short tons); 3 × T-90 main battle tanks or 5 × BTR-80 Armoured personnel carriers; plus 100 marines
- Complement: 7
- Armament: 2 KPV 14.5 mm machine guns

The Dyugon-class landing craft are operated by the Russian Navy.

== Spain ==
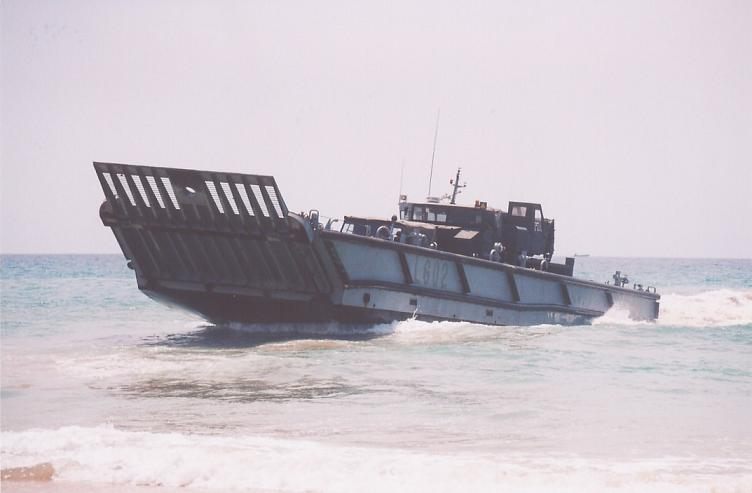
- L-602

Class overview
- Name: LCM-1E
- Builders: Navantia
- Operators: Spain; Australia; Turkey
- Preceded by: LCM-8
- Planned: 30
- Completed: 26
- Active: 24
- Retired: 2

General characteristics
- Type: Roll-on/roll-off landing craft mechanised
- Displacement: 56.6 tonnes (55.7 long tons) light; 110 tonnes (110 long tons; 120 short tons) loaded
- Length: 23.3 metres (76 ft)
- Beam: 6.4 metres (21 ft)
- Draught: 1 metre (3 ft 3 in) loaded
- Ramps: Bow ramp and stern gate
- Propulsion: 2 × MAN D-2842 LE 402X diesel engines (809 kW each); 2 × waterjets
- Speed: 22 knots (41 km/h; 25 mph) light; 13.5 knots (25.0 km/h; 15.5 mph) loaded
- Range: 190 nautical miles (350 km; 220 mi) at economic speed
- Capacity: 1 × main battle tank, or; 1 × self-propelled howitzer plus resupply vehicle, or; 2 × MOWAG Piranha, or; 6 × light tactical vehicles, or; 170 personnel with equipment
- Complement: 4

The Armada has 26 LCM-1E in service since 2001 and has been exported to Australia and Turkey.

== Sweden ==
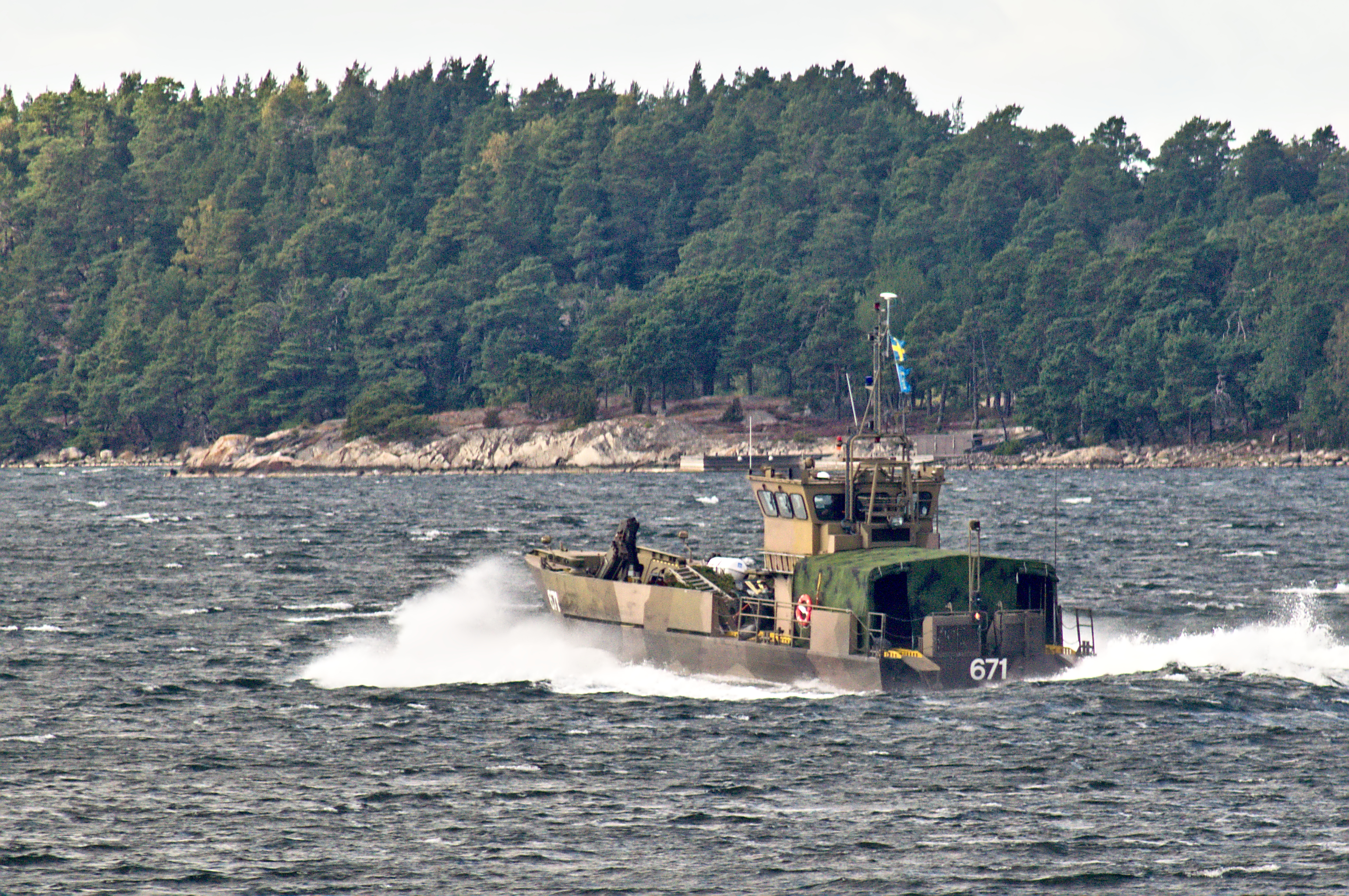
- NL LCU MK2

Class overview
- Name: Swedish: Lätt trossbåt
- Builders: Djupviks varv
- Operators: Swedish Navy United Arab Emirates Navy
- Built: 1995-
- Active: 16

General characteristics
- Type: Fast landing craft
- Displacement: 65 tonnes (64 long tons)
- Length: 24.6 m (80 ft 9 in)
- Beam: 5.4 m (17 ft 9 in)
- Draft: 1.1 m (3 ft 7 in)
- Propulsion: 3 x Scania V8 Water jet (3 x 675 hp)
- Speed: 25 knots
- Troops: 18
- Armament: 1 × 12.7 mm machine gun Mines and depth charges

Sweden operates 16 small and fast (25 kn) water jet landing craft (Swedish: Lätt trossbåt) with a displacement of 65 tonnes. They are armed with one 12.7 mm machine gun but can also lay out mines and are equipped with depth charges for anti submarine warfare. The vessel type has been exported to the United Arab Emirates.

HSwMS Loke (A344) is a larger vessel with a displacement of 305 tonnes, capable of carrying 150 tonnes. The ship has a crew of 7 and is armed with two 7.62 mm machine guns.

== United Kingdom ==
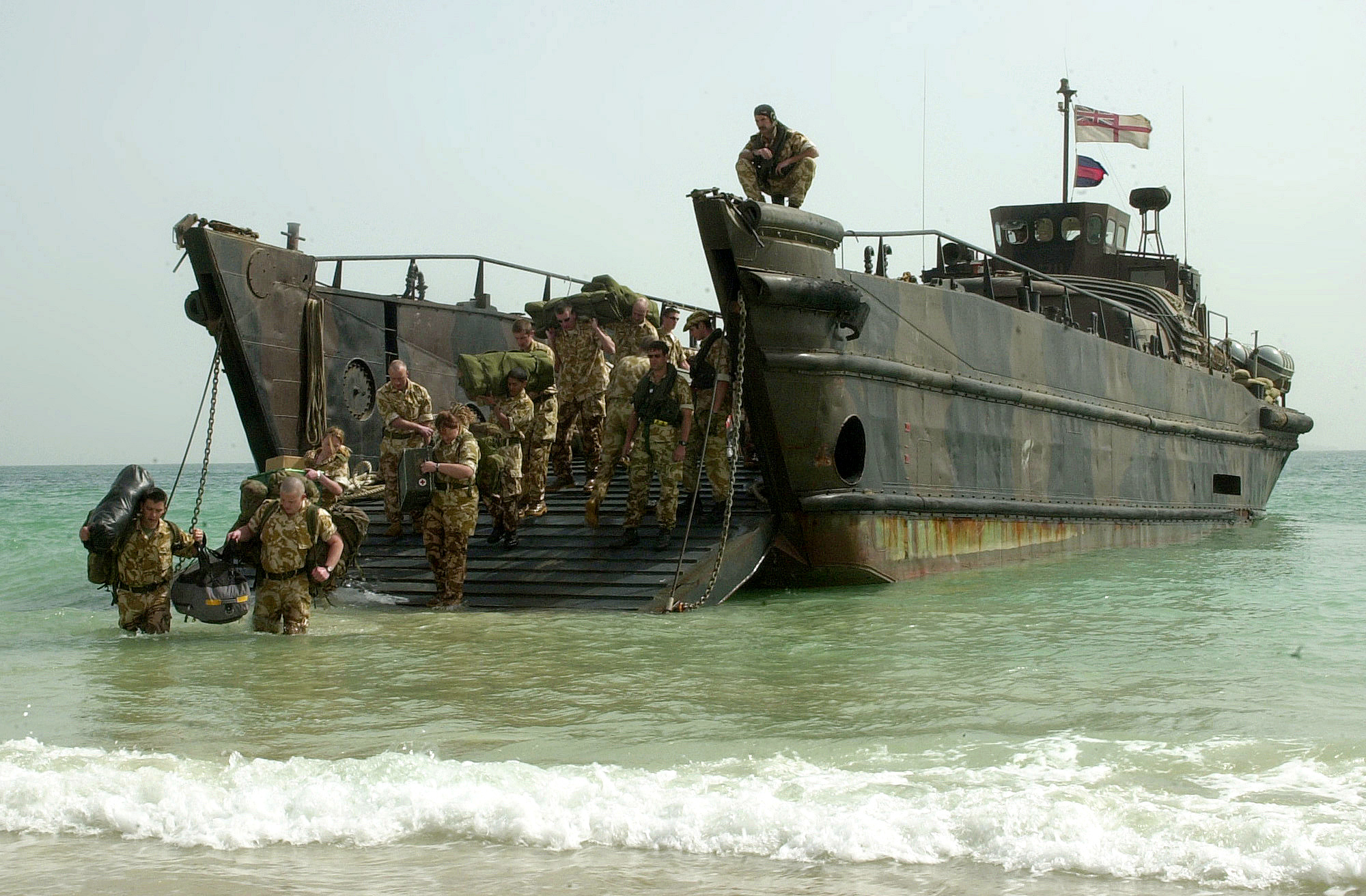
- LCU Mk.9 (now retired)

Class overview
- Name: Landing craft utility
- Operators: Royal Navy, Royal Marines
- Subclasses: LCU Mk.9 and LCU Mk.10
- Active: 9 LCU Mk.10s
- Retired: LCU Mk.9s

General characteristics LCU Mk.10
- Displacement: 240 t (240 long tons)
- Length: 97 ft 10 in (29.82 m)
- Beam: 25 ft 3 in (7.70 m)
- Draught: 4 ft 11 in (1.50 m)
- Propulsion: 2 × MAN D2840 LE diesel engines (400 kW / 2150 r.p.m. each)
- Speed: 10 knots (19 km/h; 12 mph)
- Range: 600 nautical miles (1,100 km)
- Capacity: 1 main battle tank, 4 large vehicles, or 120 troops

=== LCU Mk.9 ===
The LCU Mk.9 was built for use on the LPDs Fearless and Intrepid where they were operated from the dock in the rear of the ships. Each ship carried four LCUs and four davit mounted LCVPs. The Mk.9 was to see many changes and upgrades during its service including a move from propeller to jet in many cases. The Mk.9 was capable of traveling as an ocean-going vessel and a number would be converted into a version, affectionately known as the "Black Pig", for use in Norway. The crew had full living quarters aboard with galley and heads. In the Falklands War during the Bluff Cove Air Attacks LCU F4 from Fearless was bombed and sunk in Choiseul Sound by an Argentine Air Force A-4B Skyhawk of Grupo 5. The Mk.9, like the LPDs, served longer than ever anticipated, providing the backbone of Britain's amphibious assault capabilities.

Three Mk.9s, pennant numbers 701, 705, and 709, remained in service by 2012. However, by 2014, they had all been withdrawn from service.

=== LCU Mk.10 ===
The LCU Mk.10 class vessels are operated by the Royal Marines. They are intended for use on board the assault ships Albion and Bulwark and can also be used by the Bay class landing ships. Deliveries of the class started from 1998 and the fleet currently consists of nine vessels. Both Albion and Bulwark are capable of carrying four LCUs each. These vessels are capable of operating independently for up to 14 days with a range of 600 nautical miles. They are capable of operating worldwide, from Arctic operating areas to tropical operating areas. The Mk.10 differs greatly from the Mk.9 with the bridge being set to the side allowing for a roll-on roll-off design. This greatly increases efficiency over the old Mk.9 as loading of the rear LCUs can take place without the LCUs being launched, the LPD having to dock down to do so, to change over and load up, which was a problem prior to the Falklands landings. The LCU Mk.10 has a 7-man crew and can carry up to 120 Marines or alternatively 1 battle tank or 4 lorries. British assault ships also carry smaller LCVPs on davits to transport troops and light vehicles.

Ten Mk.10s, pennant numbers 1001 to 1010, were in service as of 2012. In 2023 it was reported that 9 of the craft remained in service.

== United States ==
The United States Navy built 1,394 Landing Craft Tank (LCT) in World War II. Those that were still in use in 1949 were redesignated as Landing craft utility (LCU).

Seventy old LCUs (likely ex-LCTs) were retired from amphibious duties and reclassified as Harbor utility craft (YFU).

=== LCU 1466, 1610 and 1627 classes ===
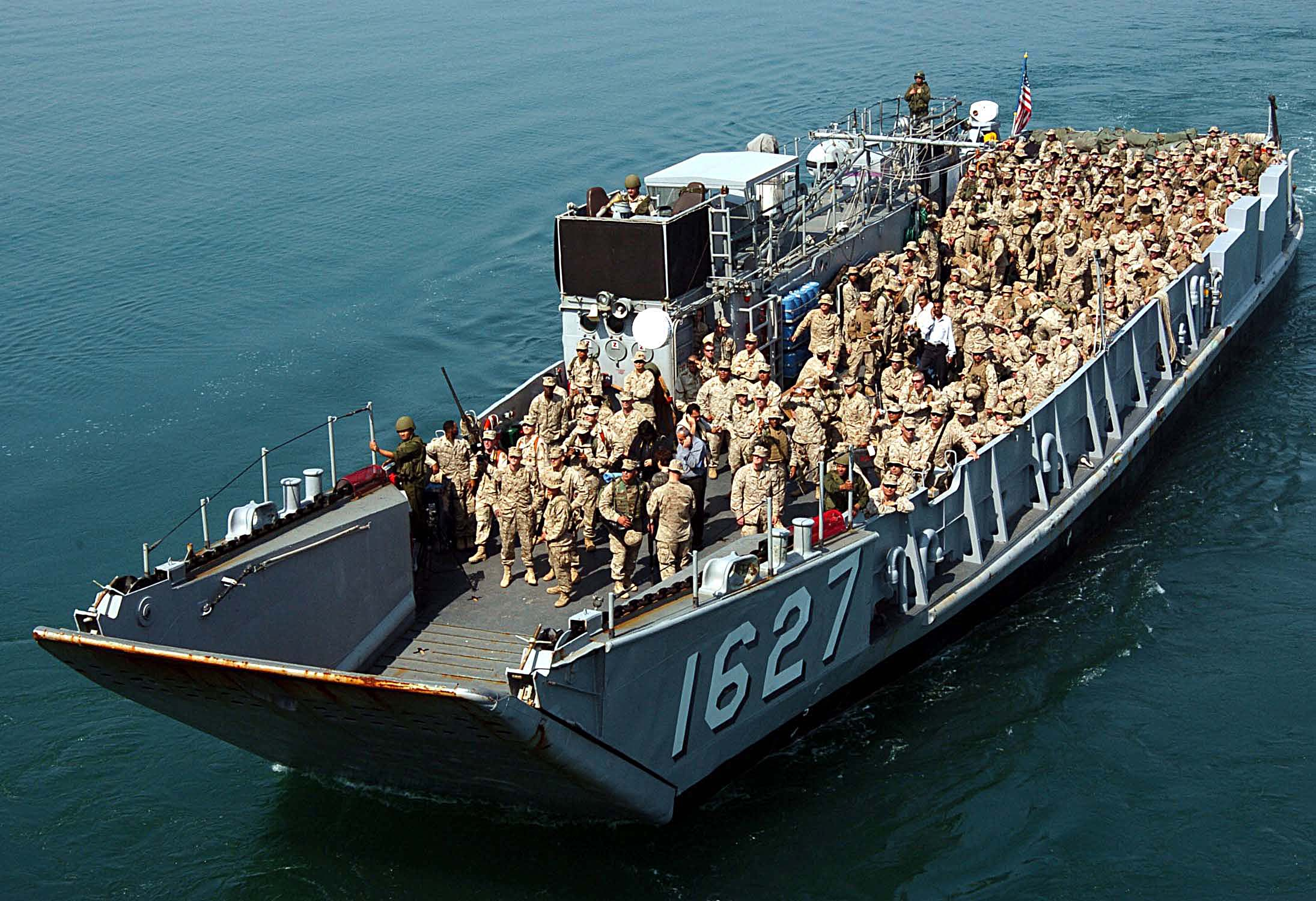
- LCU-1627

Class overview
- Name: LCU 1466, 1610 and 1627 classes
- Operators: United States Navy
- Active: 32

General characteristics
- Displacement: see table
- Length: see table
- Beam: see table
- Draft: see table
- Propulsion: see table
- Speed: see table
- Range: see table
- Endurance: 10 days
- Capacity: see table
- Troops: see table
- Sensors & processing systems: LN 66 or SPS-53 I band navigation radar
- Armament: 2 × Browning .50 caliber machine guns

The LCU 1466, 1610 and 1627 class vessels are operated by the United States Navy at support commands. They are a self-sustaining craft complete with living accommodations and mess facilities for a crew of thirteen. Each LCU is assigned a non-commissioned-officer-in-charge (Craft Master) who is either a chief petty officer or petty officer first class in the boatswain's mate, quartermaster or operations specialist rating. These vessels have bow ramps for onload/offload and can be linked bow to stern gate to create a temporary pier-like structure. Its welded steel hull provides high durability with deck loads of 3,900 kg/m^{2} (800 pounds per square foot). Arrangement of machinery and equipment has taken into account built-in redundancy in the event of battle damage.

The craft features two engine rooms separated by a watertight bulkhead to permit limited operation in the event that one engine room is disabled. An anchor system is installed on the starboard side aft to assist in retracting from the beach. These vessels are normally transported to their areas of operation onboard larger amphibious vessels such as LSDs, LHDs and LHAs.

Introduction of the larger LCU-1610 class resulted in the US Navy constructing the Anchorage class of Landing Ships, Dock (LSD).

LCU-1618 was converted to support the testing of Remotely operated underwater vehicles and Autonomous underwater vehicles and was given the name USS Orca (IX-508).

The 40-year-old craft will be replaced under LCU 1700 (ex-Surface Connector (X) Recapitalization, or SC(X)R), project starting in 2017.

	LCU 1466	LCU 1610	LCU 1627
Displacement – light	180 long tons (183 t)	172 long tons (175 t)	200 long tons (203 t)
Displacement – full	n/a	353 long tons (359 t)	386 long tons (392 t)
Length overall	115 ft 1 in (35.08 m)	134 ft 9 in (41.07 m)	134 ft 9 in (41.07 m)
Beam	34 ft 0 in (10.36 m)	29 ft 10 in (9.09 m)	29 ft 10 in (9.09 m)
Draft – full load, forward	6 ft 0 in (1.83 m)	4 ft 10 in (1.47 m)	6 ft 9 in (2.06 m)
Draft – full load, aft	2 ft 9 in (0.84 m)	3 ft 6 in (1.07 m)	3 ft 6 in (1.07 m)
Power – sustained	675 hp (503 kW)	1,000 hp (746 kW)	680 hp (507 kW)
Propulsion	3 x Gray Marine diesel engines	2 x Detroit 12V-71 diesel engines	4 x Detroit diesel engines
Shafts	3	2	2
Speed	8 knots (15 km/h; 9.2 mph)	11 knots (20 km/h; 13 mph)	8 knots (15 km/h; 9.2 mph)
Range	1,200 nmi (2,200 km) at 6 kn (11 km/h)	1,200 nmi (2,200 km) at 8 kn (15 km/h)	1,200 nmi (2,200 km) at 6 kn (11 km/h)
Complement	14	14	12–14
Capacity – troops	300	400	350
Capacity – cargo	167 long tons (170 t)	180 long tons (183 t)	125 long tons (127 t)

=== LCU 2000 ===
- LCU-2000 class

Class overview
- Name: Runnymede-class large landing craft
- Operators: United States Army

General characteristics
- Displacement: 575 long tons (584 t) light; 1,087 long tons (1,104 t) full load
- Length: 174 ft (53 m)
- Beam: 42 ft (13 m)
- Draft: 9 ft (2.7 m) light; 8 ft (2.4 m) loaded; 4 ft (1.2 m) beaching draft at the bow
- Speed: 11.5 knots (21.3 km/h; 13.2 mph)
- Range: 10,000 nmi (19,000 km) at 12 kn (22 km/h) light; 6,500 nmi (12,000 km) at 10 kn (19 km/h) loaded
- Capacity: 350 short tons (318 t) (8 C-17 loads); 5 × M1 main battle tanks or 12 × (24 double-stacked) 20-foot (6 m) ISO containers
- Complement: 13

The Runnymede-class large landing craft or LCU 2000 class vessels are operated by the United States Army. They transport rolling and tracked vehicles, containers, and outsized and general cargo from ships offshore to shore, as well as to areas that cannot be reached by oceangoing vessels (coastal, harbor, and intercoastal waterways). They can be self-deployed or transported aboard a float-on/float-off vessel. They are classed for full ocean service and one-man engine room operations and built to U.S. Coast Guard standards. The vessel can sustain a crew of 2 warrant officers and 11 enlisted personnel for up to 18 days and 10,000 miles. This class is also equipped with an aft anchor to assist in retracting from the beach.

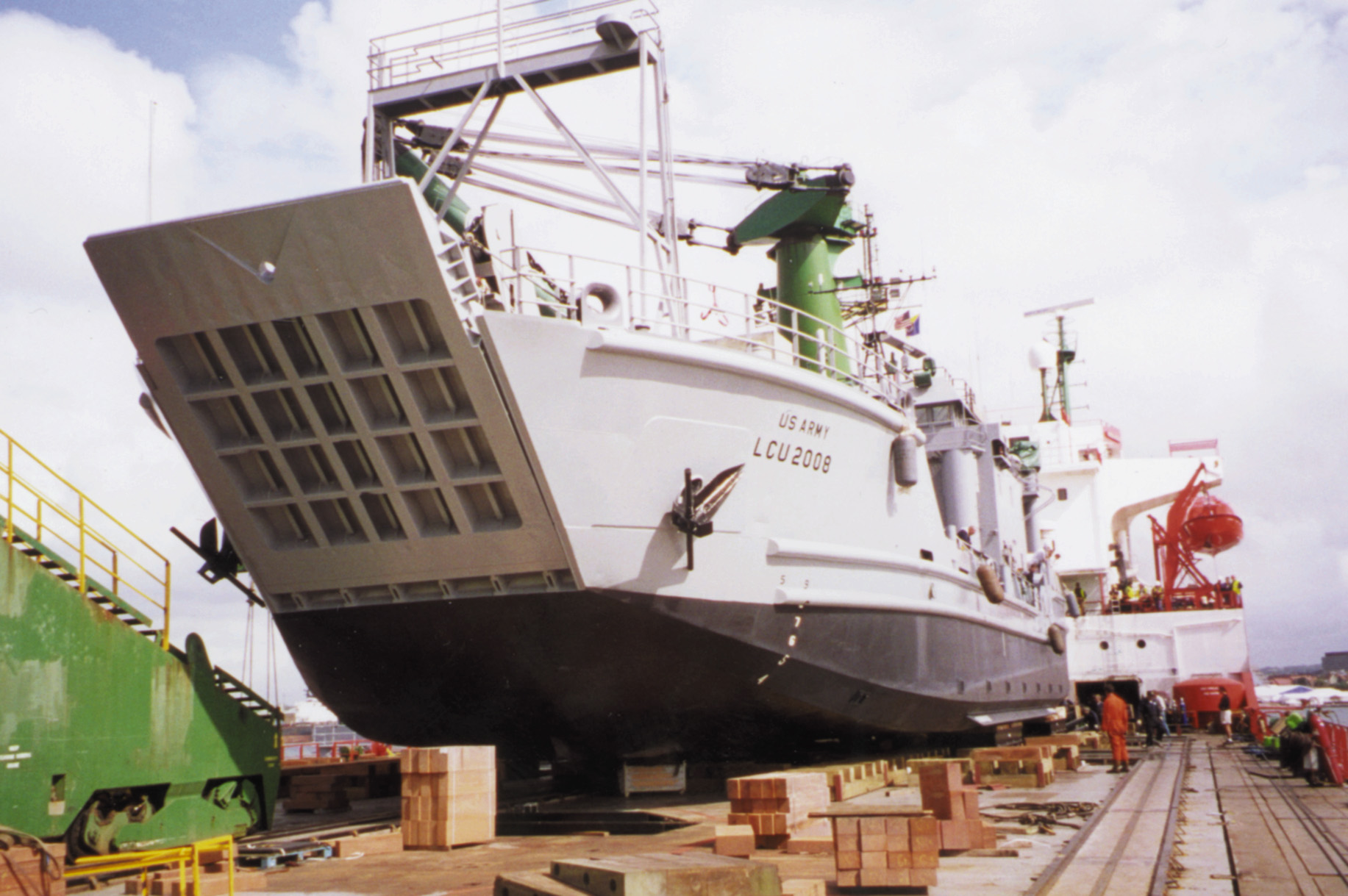
LCU 2008 being loaded as deck cargo on a chartered vessel.

=== LCU 1700 ===
The LCU 1700-class boats are destined to replace the existing LCU 1610-class of amphibious landing craft on a one-to-one basis. The LCU-1700 is 139 feet long, can reach speeds of 11 knots, has a range of 1,200 nautical miles at 8 knots, and has accommodations for a mixed gender crew of 14. It can carry two M1A1 tanks, or 350 combat troops, or 170 short tons of cargo.

The contract announcement noted that the LCU 1700s will recapitalize the LCU fleet as a similarly rugged steel craft (to the LCU 1610) with a design life of 30 years. The similarities of these two classes of ships will help the U.S. Navy to improve efficiency and reduce cost of the training programs, operations and overall ownership cost. The craft will enter, exit and be transported in well decks of current and programmed U.S. Navy amphibious warfare ships, for design purposes defined by the dimensions of LHD, LPD, LSD and LHA classes without ship alterations, while transporting loads up to 11 feet high above the craft’s vehicle deck. The contract was awarded to Swiftships in 2018 to design and build the prototype and up to 32 vessels. Work was to be performed in Morgan City, Louisiana, and was expected to be completed by November 2023. By 2020, the Navy had ordered six vessels from Swiftships at a total cost of about $95 million. In January 2024, following delays in the scheduled delivery of the first three vessels and continued design changes, the Navy ordered Swiftships to stop work on construction; the contract was terminated entirely the following month.

In September 2023, the Navy awarded Austal USA a $92 million contract to build three LCU 1700 vessels. In August 2024, the Navy ordered two more vessels from Austal for $55 million, with options for seven more remaining.
