= LCVP =

LCVP can refer to

- Leaving Certificate Vocational Programme, an Irish education programme
- Landing Craft Vehicle Personnel, a small military vessel for transfers from ship to shore during amphibious landings.
  - LCVP (Australia), modern Australian LCVP
  - LCVP (Netherlands), modern Dutch LCVP
  - LCVP (United Kingdom), modern British LCVP
  - LCVP (United States), the World War II craft used by the Allies
