= Mk. IV LCU =

Indian Navy landing craft class

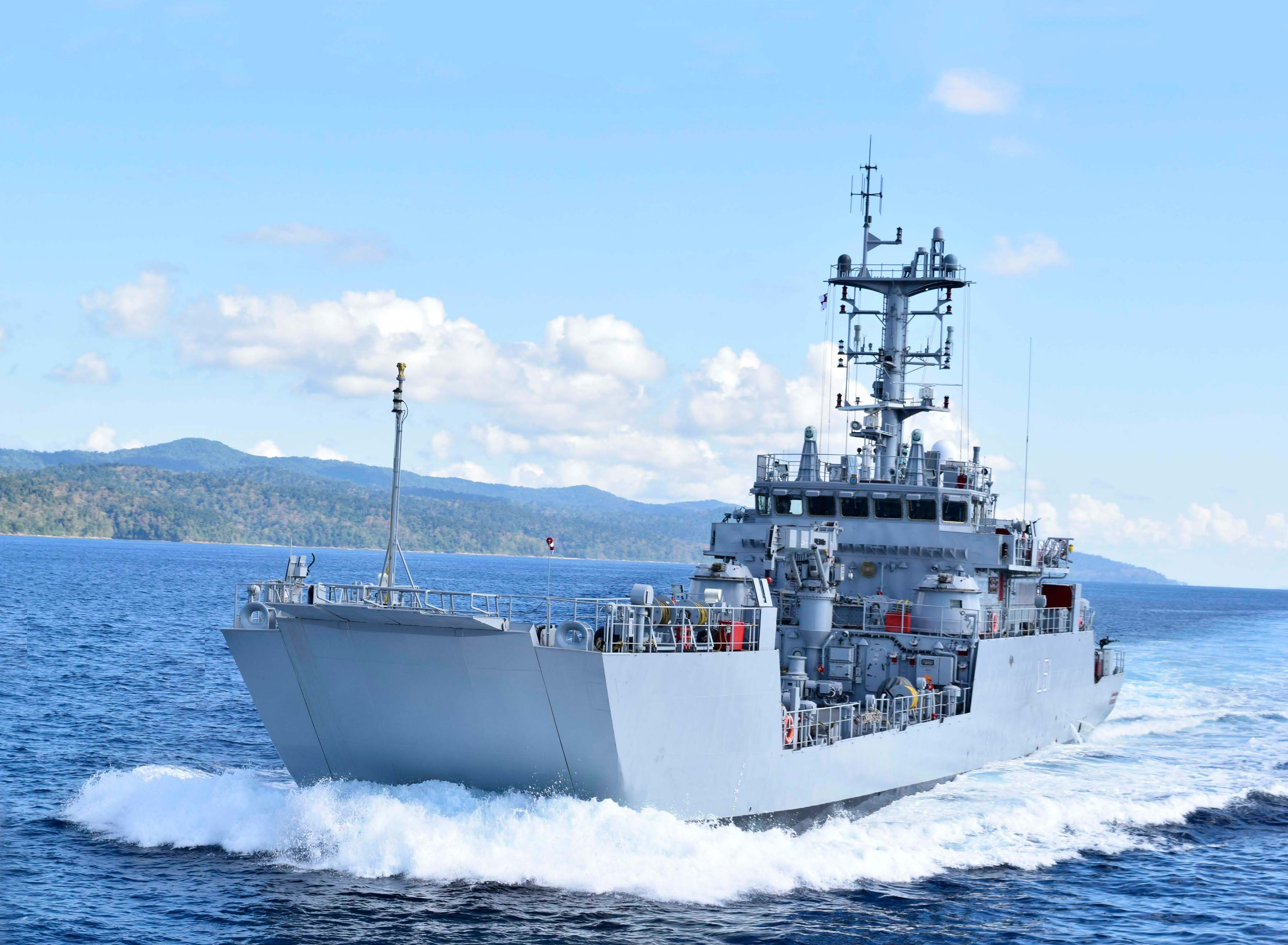
- MK.IV LCU (L51) at sea.

Class overview
- Name: LCU MK IV class
- Builders: GRSE
- Operators: Indian Navy
- Preceded by: Mk. III LCU
- Cost: ₹2,100 crore (equivalent to ₹43 billion or US$510 million in 2023)
- Built: 2011 – 2020
- Planned: 8
- Completed: 8
- Active: 8

General characteristics
- Type: Landing craft utility
- Displacement: 830 t (910 tons) standard; 1,001 t (1,103 tons) full load
- Length: 62.8 m (206 ft)
- Beam: 11 m (36 ft)
- Draught: 2.2 m (7 ft 3 in)
- Installed power: 1,840 kW (2,470 hp) each
- Propulsion: 2 × MTU 16V 4000 M53 diesel engines; Fixed-pitch propellers
- Speed: 15 kn (28 km/h)
- Range: 1,500 nmi (2,800 km) at 12 kn (22 km/h)
- Troops: 160
- Complement: 56
- Sensors & processing systems: SATCOM - LINK II Mod 1 tactical datalink; Sanket S passive electronic warfare system; ELK 7036 communications intelligence (COMINT) system; MiniPOP surveillance system
- Armament: 2 × 30 mm CRN 91 naval gun; 12.7 mm heavy machine guns; 7.62 mm machine guns; Igla man-portable surface-to-air missiles

Mk IV LCU class vessels follow on class of Mk. III LCU operated by the Indian Navy. The Mk IV LCU can be deployed for maritime roles that require amphibious capabilities.

== History ==
GRSE signed an agreement for ₹2,100 crore (equivalent to ₹43 billion or US$510 million in 2023) with the Indian Navy for designing and building eight LCU ships on 28 September 2011 and construction began in September 2012.

The sixth ship of the series, also the 100th ship to be built by the shipyard, was delivered to the Indian Navy on 30 March 2019.

The last ship of the class was delivered on 31 December 2020 and was commissioned into service on 18 March 2021.

== Design ==
The ship is 63 metres long, overall beam of 11 metres, a hull draught of 2.2 metres and displaces around 830 tonnes. They are powered by two MTU 16V 4000 M53 marine diesel engines (each 1840 KWs). They are equipped with two 30mm CRN-91 mounted guns with a Bharat Electronics-built EON-51 electro-optic director.

The LCU can carry up to 216 personnel and 145 tonnes of cargo. It is fitted with a hydraulic bow ramp.

== Ships of the class ==
Yard No	Pennant	Laid down	Launched	Commissioned	Status
2092	L 51	26 April 2013	12 March 2014	28 March 2017	Active
2093	L 52	24 April 2013	23 September 2014	21 August 2017	Active
2094	L 53	13 August 2014	16 January 2015	25 April 2018	Active
2095	L 54	13 August 2014	23 March 2015	25 May 2018	Active
2096	L 55	2014	7 December 2015	19 December 2018	Active
2097	L 56	30 September 2014	12 March 2016	29 July 2019	Active
2098	L 57	28 March 2015	24 November 2016	15 May 2020	Active
2099	L 58	31 August 2015	16 December 2016	18 March 2021	Active

== Gallery ==
Images of MK IV LCU of Indian Navy
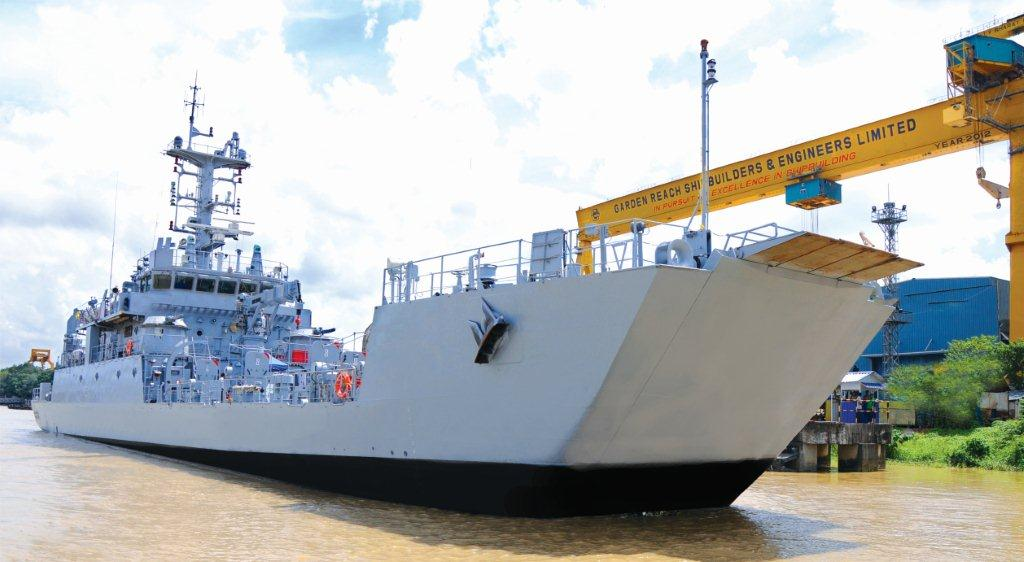
MK IV LCU during construction trials

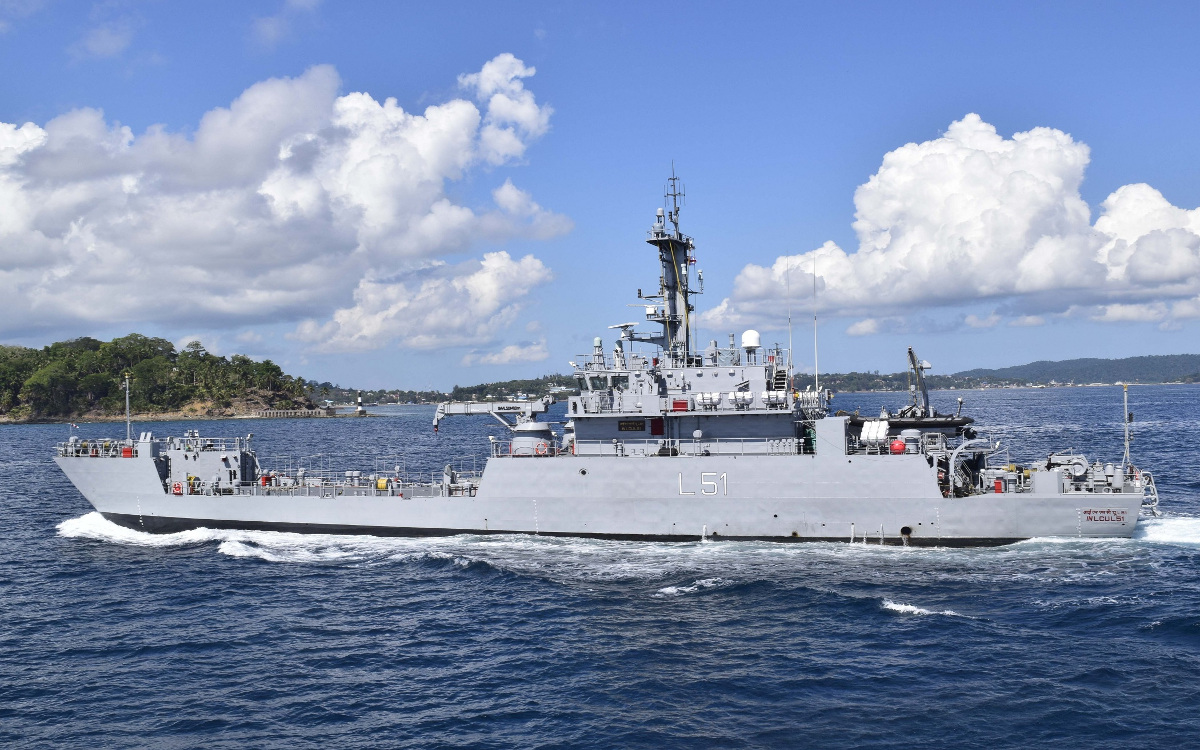
LCU 51, a Mk. IV LCU, during MILAN 2018

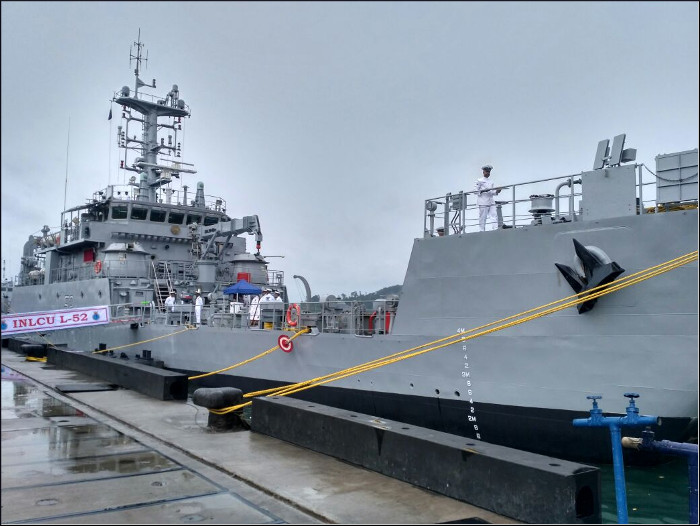
Dr. Jagdish Mukhi, Lieutenant Governor, Andaman and Nicobar Islands, commissioned IN LCU L52 into the Indian Navy at Port Blair

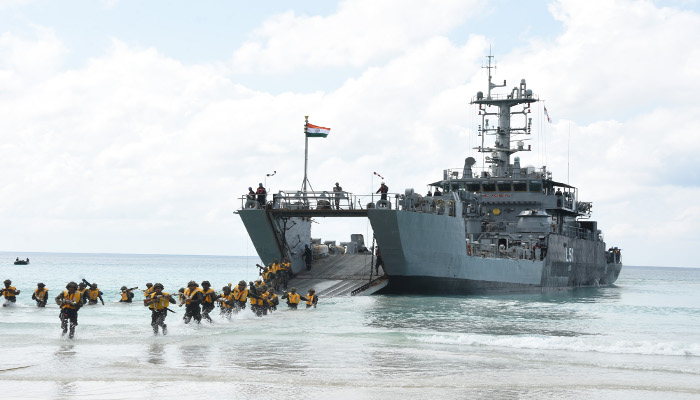
Andaman and Nicobar Command (ANC) has conducted the second edition of Defence of Andaman & Nicobar Islands 2019 (DANX-19),.

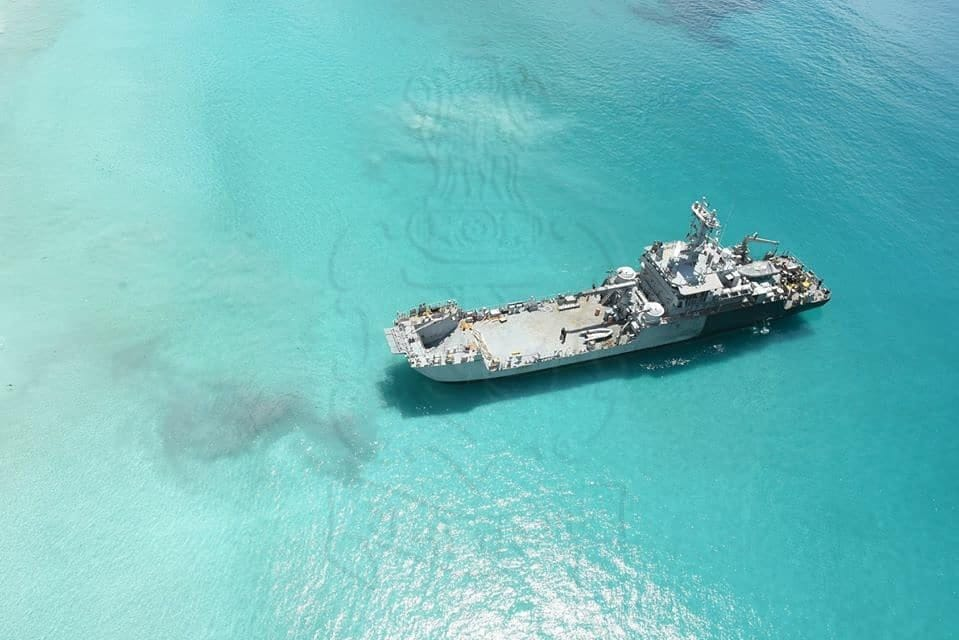
LCU 51 during operations at Andaman and Nicobar Islands.

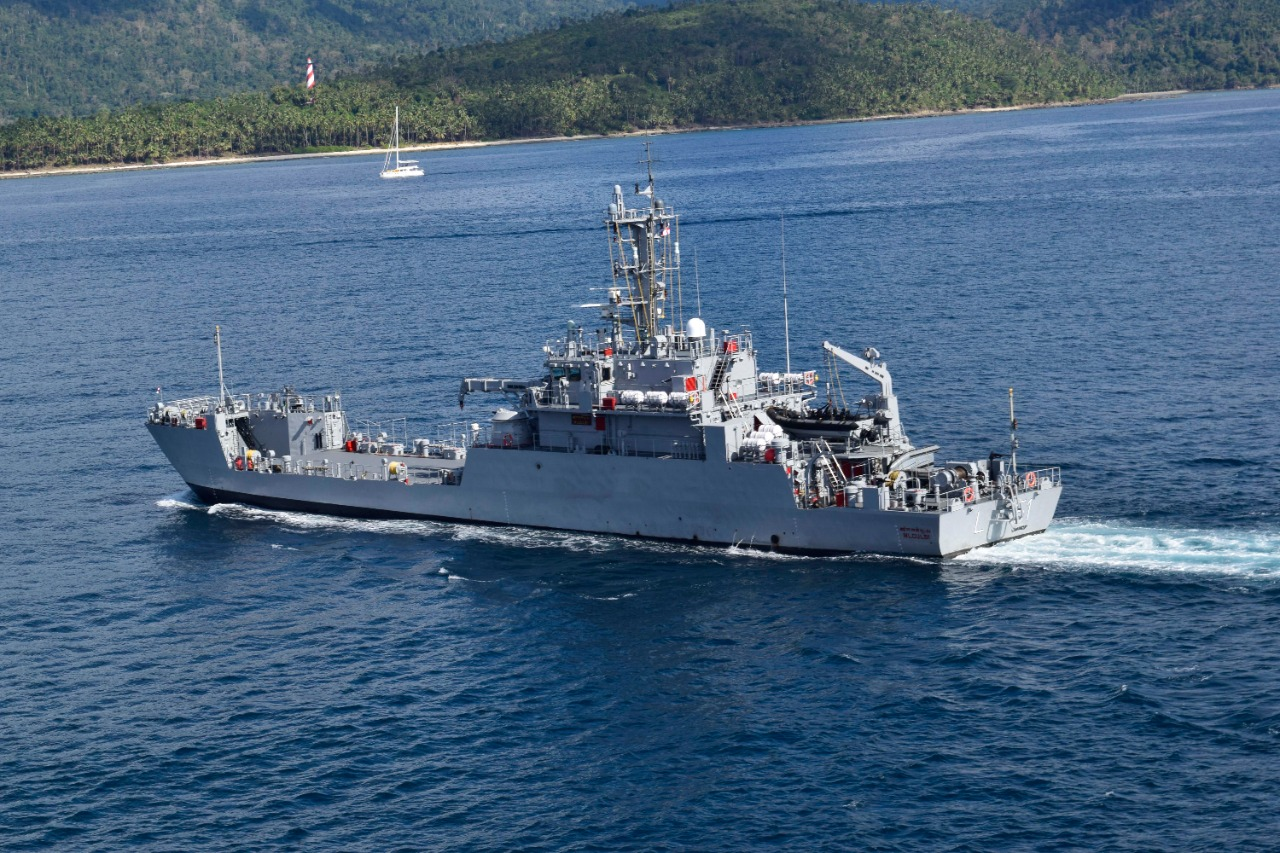
The last ship of the batch LCU 58 during trials.

== See also ==
- List of active Indian Navy ships
- Future ships of the Indian Navy
