= (NL)LCU =

Landing craft

The (NL)LCU, which stands for (Netherlands) Landing craft utility, is a Dutch LCU. The Royal Netherlands Navy currently operates four LCU type Mk.III as well as twelve LCVPs for the Marine Corps.

== (NL)LCU type Mk.I ==
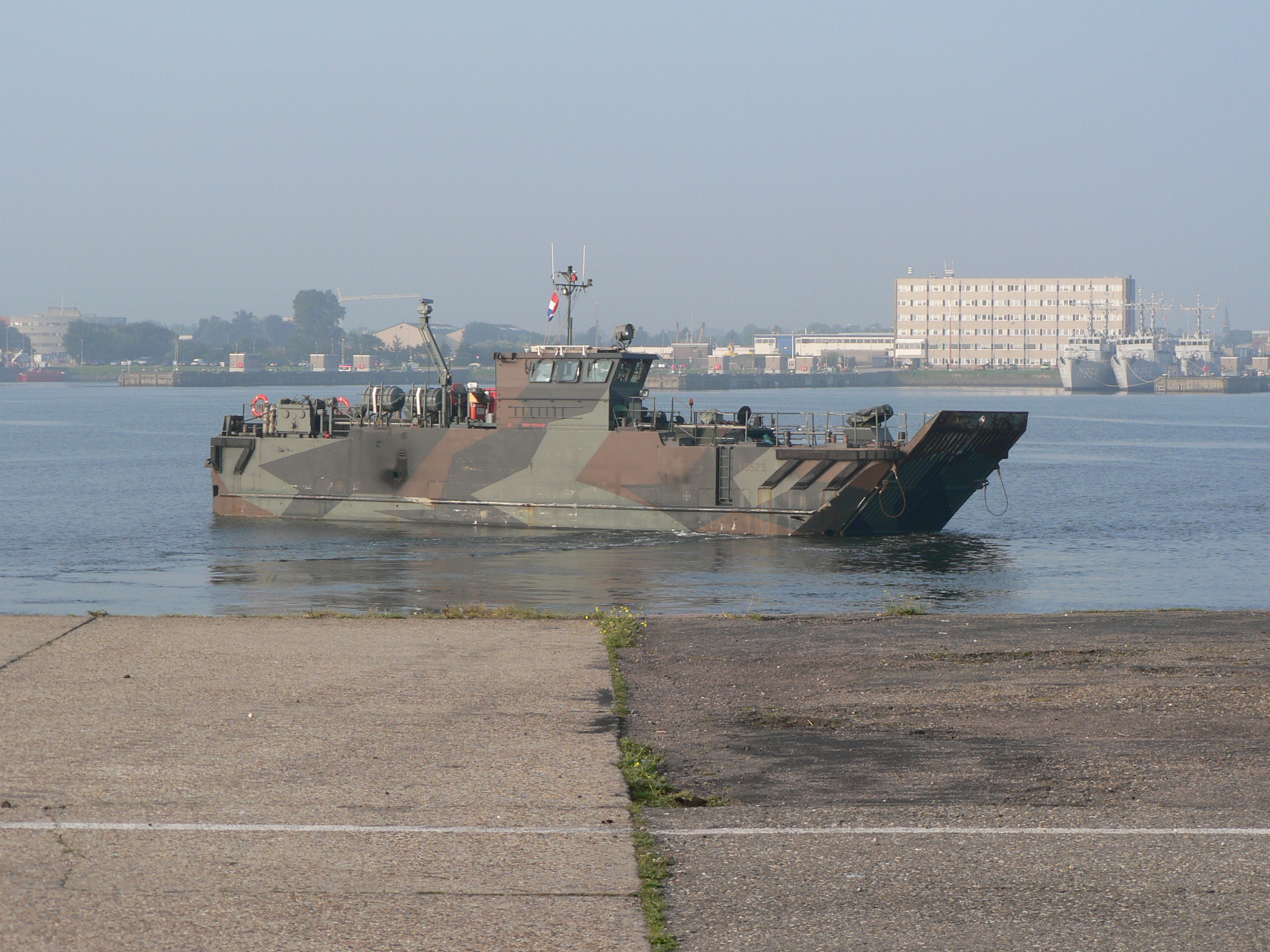

Class overview
- Name: (NL)LCU Mk.I
- Operators: Royal Netherlands Navy, Netherlands Marine Corps
- Succeeded by: (NL)LCU Mk.II
- Built: 1997-1999
- In service: 1997-2006
- Planned: 5
- Completed: 5

General characteristics
- Type: Landing craft utility
- Displacement: 225 tonnes (221 long tons)
- Length: 27.30 m (89 ft 7 in)
- Beam: 6.85 m (22 ft 6 in)
- Speed: 11.6 knots (21.5 km/h; 13.3 mph)
- Capacity: 130 troops, 3 trucks, 2 armoured vehicles, 1 BRV
- Complement: 6 crew
- Armament: 2× Browning M2 (12.7mm) machine guns

=== Ships ===
Pennant no.	Status	Note
L9525	In service	Upgraded to Mk.II
L9526	In service	Upgraded to Mk.II
L9527	In service	Upgraded to Mk.II
L9528	In service	Upgraded to Mk.II
L9529	In service	Upgraded to Mk.II

== (NL)LCU type Mk.II ==
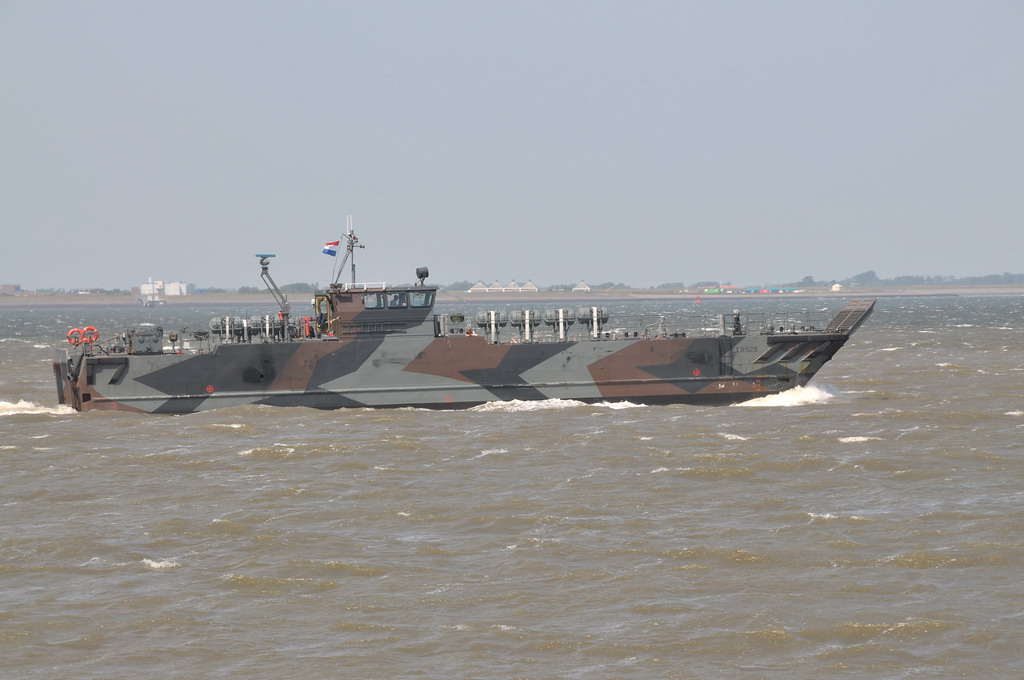

Class overview
- Name: (NL)LCU Mk.II
- Operators: Royal Netherlands Navy, Netherlands Marine Corps
- Preceded by: (NL)LCU Mk.I
- Succeeded by: (NL)LCU Mk.III
- Built: 2005-2006
- In service: 2005-present
- Planned: 5
- Completed: 5
- Retired: 1 (9525)

General characteristics
- Type: Landing craft utility
- Displacement: 225 tonnes (221 long tons)
- Length: 36.30 m (119 ft 1 in)
- Beam: 6.85 m (22 ft 6 in)
- Speed: 11.6 knots (21.5 km/h; 13.3 mph)
- Capacity: 130 troops, 3 trucks, 2 armoured vehicles, 1 BRV
- Complement: 7 crew
- Armament: 2× Browning M2 (12.7mm) machine guns

The Mk.I ships were extended by 9 m (29 ft 6 in). As a result, they could carry an extra 20 tons and land further up the beach. All Mk.I were upgraded to Mk.II standards.

=== Ships ===
Pennant no.	Status	Note
L9525	Sold	
L9526	In service	Upgraded to Mk.III
L9527	In service	Upgraded to Mk.III
L9528	In service	Upgraded to Mk.III
L9529	In service	Upgraded to Mk.III

== (NL)LCU type Mk.III ==
Class overview
- Name: (NL)LCU Mk.III
- Operators: Royal Netherlands Navy, Netherlands Marine Corps
- Preceded by: (NL)LCU Mk.II
- Built: 2023-present
- In service: 2024-present
- Planned: 4
- Completed: 4

General characteristics
- Type: Landing craft utility
- Displacement: 225 tonnes (221 long tons)
- Length: 36.30 m (119 ft 1 in)
- Beam: 6.85 m (22 ft 6 in)
- Speed: 11.6 knots (21.5 km/h; 13.3 mph)
- Capacity: 130 troops, 3 trucks, 2 armoured vehicles, 1 BRV
- Complement: 7 crew
- Armament: 2× Browning M2 (12.7mm) machine guns

As part of their MLU, four Mk.II craft have been upgraded to Mk.III standards. L9525 was sold and L9528 was the first to undergo this MLU. It is estimated that the remaining four LCU's will remain in service until at least 2032. On 23 January 2025 the first two refurbished LCUs were delivered by De Haas Shipyards to the Royal Netherlands Navy. In August 2026 it was reported that the last LCU type Mk.III had been delivered to the RNLN.

=== Ships ===
Pennant no.	Status	Note
L9528	In service	

== See also ==
- (NL)LCVP
- Future of the Royal Netherlands Navy
