= Mk. III LCU =

Vessel class

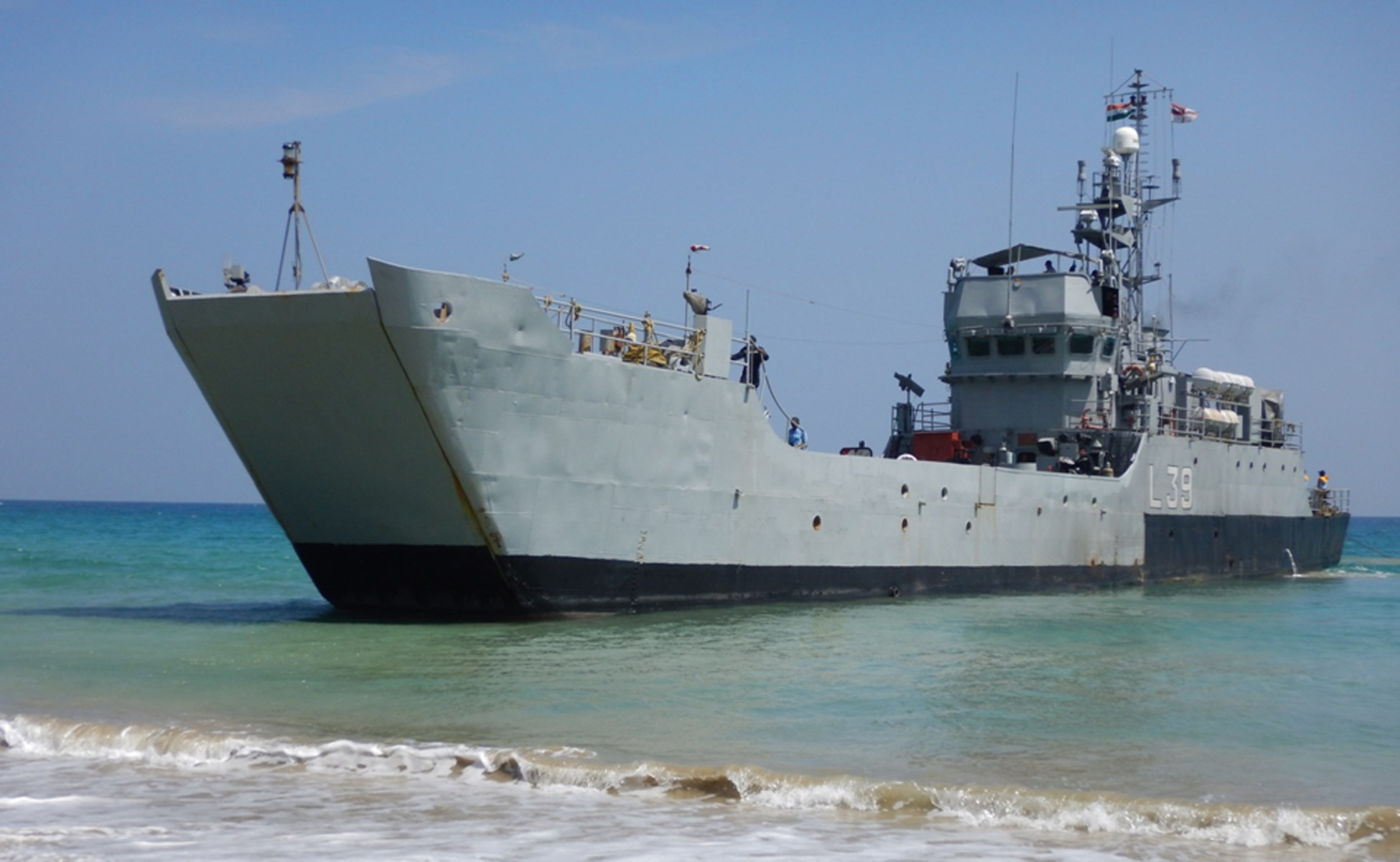
- L39 LCU during shore operations

Class overview
- Name: LCU MK III class
- Builders: Goa Shipyard Limited
- Operators: Indian Navy
- Preceded by: LCU Mk II
- Succeeded by: LCU MK IV
- Built: 1986 – 87
- In service: 1986 – 2019
- Planned: 4
- Completed: 4
- Retired: 4

General characteristics
- Displacement: 560 tons
- Length: 57.5 m
- Beam: 8.2 m
- Draft: 1.57 m
- Depth: 4 m
- Propulsion: 3 Kirloskar-MAN V8V 17.5/22 AMAL diesel engines x 562 bhp driving 3 shafts.
- Speed: 11.5 kn
- Range: 1,000 nmi at 8 kn
- Troops: 120
- Complement: 207
- Crew: 87
- Sensors & processing systems: 1 Racal Decca 1629 radar at I-band frequency.
- Armament: 2 x Bofors 40mm/60 guns (aft) & mines

Mk III LCU class vessels were follow on class of Mk II LCU operated by the Indian Navy and were meant to augment the Indian Navy's amphibious capability. The ships were deployed for maritime roles like maritime security, beaching, un-beaching, humanitarian relief operations and evacuation from distant islands, search and rescue operations and peace-keeping missions. The landing craft were meant for use by amphibious forces to transport equipment and troops to the shore. They were capable of transporting tracked or wheeled vehicles and troops from amphibious assault ships to beachheads or piers. The landing craft were carried on board amphibious assault ships to the objective area. Built and delivered between 1986-87 the mission of the LCU was to land/retrieve personnel and equipment (tanks, artillery, equipment, motor vehicles) during amphibious operations. LCU's help land personnel and equipment after the initial assault waves of an amphibious operation.

== History ==
Goa Shipyard Limited built and delivered these 4 LCU Mk III ships between 1978 and 1987 alongside the now decommissioned 2 LCU Mk I and 3 LCU Mk II ships. These versatile vessels served Indian Navy for over 30 years and were retired in 2018/19.

== Service ==
The LCU Mark-III ships were developed in-house by Goa Shipyard and are designed for multipurpose amphibious operations to be carried out by Indian Navy. In Dec 2016, LCU L38 was part of the operation to rescue 800 tourists stranded in Havelock Islands In 1988, Lt Cdr KR Nair; the commanding officer of LCU 36 was awarded Nau Sena Medal for conducting Operation Pawan Patrol, an anti militant patrol operation in uncharted waters. LCU 36 was also involved in providing cyclone relief service in 1990 at Rangat Island part of Andaman Islands

== Ships of the class ==
Yard No	Pennant	Laid down	Launched	Commissioned	Decommissioned	Home-port
	L 36			18 July 1986	9 February 2018	Port Blair
	L 37			18 October 1986	9 February 2018	Port Blair
	L 38			10 December 1986	30 March 2019	Port Blair
	L 39			25 March 1987	30 March 2019	Port Blair

== See also ==
- List of ships of the Indian Navy
- List of active Indian Navy ships
- Future ships of the Indian Navy
