= (NL)LCVP =

Dutch landing craft vehicle

The (NL)LCVP, which stands for (Netherlands) Landing Craft Vehicle Personnel, is a Dutch LCVP. The Royal Netherlands Navy currently operates twelve LCVP type Mk.V(C) as well as five LCUs for the Marine Corps.

== (NL)LCVP type Mk.I ==
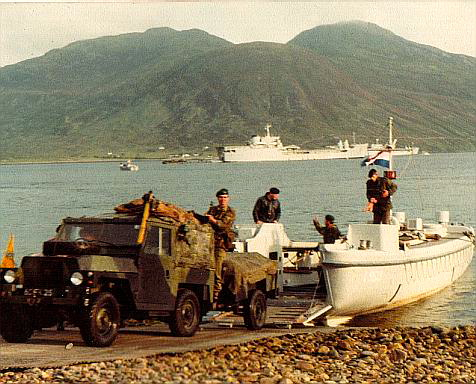

Class overview
- Name: (NL)LCVP Mk.I
- Operators: Royal Netherlands Navy, Netherlands Marine Corps
- Succeeded by: (NL)LCVP Mk.II
- Built: 1961-1964
- In service: 1962-1986
- Planned: 10
- Completed: 10
- Retired: 10
- Preserved: 2

General characteristics
- Type: Landing craft vehicle personnel
- Displacement: 12.6 tonnes (12 long tons)
- Length: 14.15 m (46 ft 5 in)
- Beam: 3.62 m (11 ft 11 in)
- Propulsion: 1 Schottel propeller; 200 bhp (149 kW) Rolls Royce diesel engine
- Speed: 12 knots (22 km/h; 14 mph)
- Complement: 3 crew
- Armament: 1× 7.62mm machine gun

Also known as LCA type Mark I, LCA Mark I or L 9510 type Mk I. These landing craft were made of polyester and built between 1961 and 1964 by several Dutch shipyards. The polyester hull was built using the sandwich method that involved using layers of polyester. Furthermore, they were equipped with a Rolls Royce diesel engine that could produce 200 bhp and drive the schottel propeller to a maximum speed of 12 knots. The craft were operated by a crew of three persons. Starting in 1983 they were replaced by the LCA Mark II.

=== Craft ===
(NL)LCVP type Mk.I construction data
Pennant no.	Builder	Laid down	Launched	Commissioned	Status	Note
L9510	Rijkswerf Willemsoord	1 January 1961	14 December 1961	25 June 1962	Out of service	Prototype, decommissioned on 8 December 1986.
L9511	Rijkswerf Willemsoord	October 1962	February 1963	26 June 1963	Out of service	Decommissioned on 8 December 1986.
L9512	Rijkswerf Willemsoord	November 1962	February 1963	26 June 1963	Out of service	Preserved
L9513	Rijkswerf Willemsoord	December 1962	February 1963	26 June 1963	Out of service	Preserved
L9514	A. Lecomte co. Inc.	1963	1963	17 April 1963	Out of service	
L9515	A. Lecomte co. Inc.	1963	1963	17 April 1963	Out of service	
L9517	A. Lecomte co. Inc.	1963	1963	17 April 1963	Out of service	Decommissioned on 8 December 1986 and sold to the Joost Dourlein Barracks.
L9518	Verolme Scheepswerf	1962	16 April 1963	2 May 1963	Out of service	
L9520	Verolme Scheepswerf	1962	21 June 1963; 12 April 1964	26 April 1964	Out of service	Original craft had an accident during sea trials and as a result a new craft with the same pennant was built.
L9522	Verolme Scheepswerf	1962	19 August 1963	27 August 1963	Out of service	Decommissioned on 8 December 1986 and gifted on 11 May 1987 to the Naval Fire department (Dutch: Marinebrandweer).

== (NL)LCVP type Mk.II ==
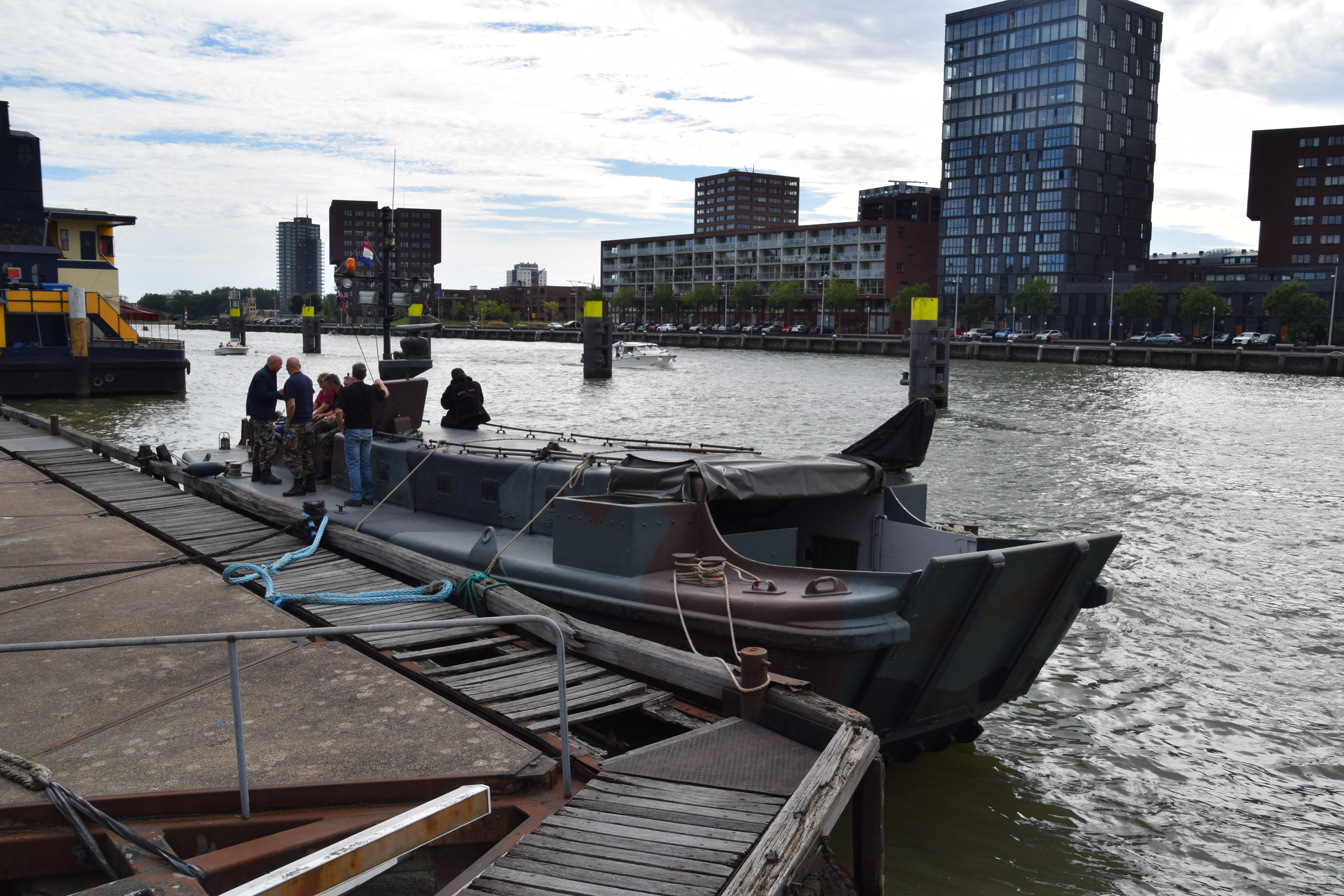

Class overview
- Name: (NL)LCVP Mk.II
- Builders: Rijkswerf Willemsoord, Den Helder
- Operators: Royal Netherlands Navy, Netherlands Marine Corps
- Preceded by: (NL)LCVP Mk.I
- Succeeded by: (NL)LCVP Mk.III; (NL)LCVP Mk.V
- Built: 1981-1987
- In service: 1984-2009
- Planned: 12
- Completed: 6
- Canceled: 6
- Retired: 6
- Preserved: 2

General characteristics
- Type: Landing craft vehicle personnel
- Displacement: 14 tonnes (14 long tons)
- Length: 16 m (52 ft 6 in)
- Beam: 4.20 m (13 ft 9 in)
- Propulsion: 1 Schottel propeller; 260 hp (194 kW) DAF DKS 1160/m turbo diesel engine
- Speed: 11.6 knots (21.5 km/h; 13.3 mph)
- Range: 220 miles at 11 knots
- Capacity: 35 troops, 4,300 kg (9,500 lb), Land Rover or BV 202E
- Complement: 3 crew
- Sensors & processing systems: Racal-Decca 110 I band navigation radar
- Armament: 1× FN FAL (7.62mm) machine gun

Also known as LCA Mark II or L 9530 type Mk II. The (NL)LCVP type Mk.II first entered service in 1984 and were made of polyester. They were equipped with a DAF DKS 1160/m turbo diesel engine that could produce 260 hp and drive the schottel propeller to a maximum speed of 11 knots. The craft had a range of 220 miles and were equipped with a Racal-Decca 110 I band navigation radar and a FN FAL 7.62 mm machine gun. Each craft could carry 35 troops, a Land Rover or a BV 202E Snowcat. A first series of 6 ships was built, with a second series of another six planned. The second batch was eventually cancelled in favour of six (NL)LCVP type Mk.III.

=== Craft ===
(NL)LCVP type Mk.II construction data
Pennant no.	Builder	Laid down	Commissioned	Status	Note
L9530	Rijkswerf Willemsoord	15 April 1982	10 October 1984	Out of service	
L9531	Rijkswerf Willemsoord	16 November 1982	20 December 1984	Out of service	
L9532	Rijkswerf Willemsoord	12 December 1983	4 July 1985	Out of service	Preserved
L9533	Rijkswerf Willemsoord	28 December 1984	13 December 1985	Out of service	
L9534	Rijkswerf Willemsoord	1 April 1985	13 December 1985	Out of service	Preserved
L9535	Rijkswerf Willemsoord	5 December 1985	5 January 1987	Out of service	

== (NL)LCVP type Mk.III ==
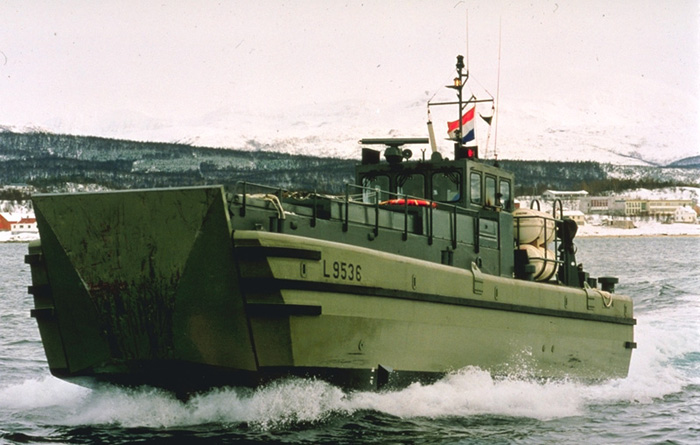

Class overview
- Name: (NL)LCVP Mk.III
- Builders: Van der Giessen-De Noord, Hardinxveld-Giessendam
- Operators: Royal Netherlands Navy, Netherlands Marine Corps
- Preceded by: (NL)LCVP Mk.II
- Succeeded by: (NL)LCVP Mk.V
- Built: 1989-1992
- In service: 1990-2009
- Planned: 6
- Completed: 6
- Retired: 6

General characteristics
- Type: Landing craft vehicle personnel
- Displacement: 23 tonnes (23 long tons)
- Length: 16.90 m (55 ft 5 in)
- Beam: 4.72 m (15 ft 6 in)
- Propulsion: 2 propellers; 750 hp (559 kW) diesel engines
- Speed: 14 knots (26 km/h; 16 mph) (full load)
- Range: 200 miles at 12 knots
- Capacity: Platoon marines, 6,600 kg (14,600 lb), Land Rover with trailer or a Bv 206
- Complement: 3 crew
- Sensors & processing systems: Racal-Decca 110 I band navigation radar
- Armament: 1× Browning M2 (12.7mm) machine gun

Also known as LCA Mark III or L 9536 type LCA Mk III, these craft were an improved version of the LCA Mark II. They were made of polyester and ordered on 10 December 1988 at van der Giessen-de Noord. The Mark III was equipped with two diesel engines that could produce 750 hp and drive its two propellers to a maximum speed of 14 knots when fully loaded or 16.5 knots when lightly loaded. It could carry a platoon of marines, a Land Rover with trailer or 120 mm mortar, a max of 6600 kg of goods or a Bv 206 snowcat. The craft had a range of 200 miles at 12 knots and were equipped with a Racal-Decca 110 I band navigation radar. As armament it had a single 7.62 machine gun.

=== Craft ===
(NL)LCVP type Mk.III construction data
Pennant no.	Builder	Status	Note
L9536	Van der Giessen-De Noord	Out of service	
L9537	Van der Giessen-De Noord	Out of service	
L9538	Van der Giessen-De Noord	Out of service	
L9539	Van der Giessen-De Noord	Out of service	
L9540	Van der Giessen-De Noord	Out of service	
L9541	Van der Giessen-De Noord	Out of service	

== (NL)LCVP type Mk.V(C) ==
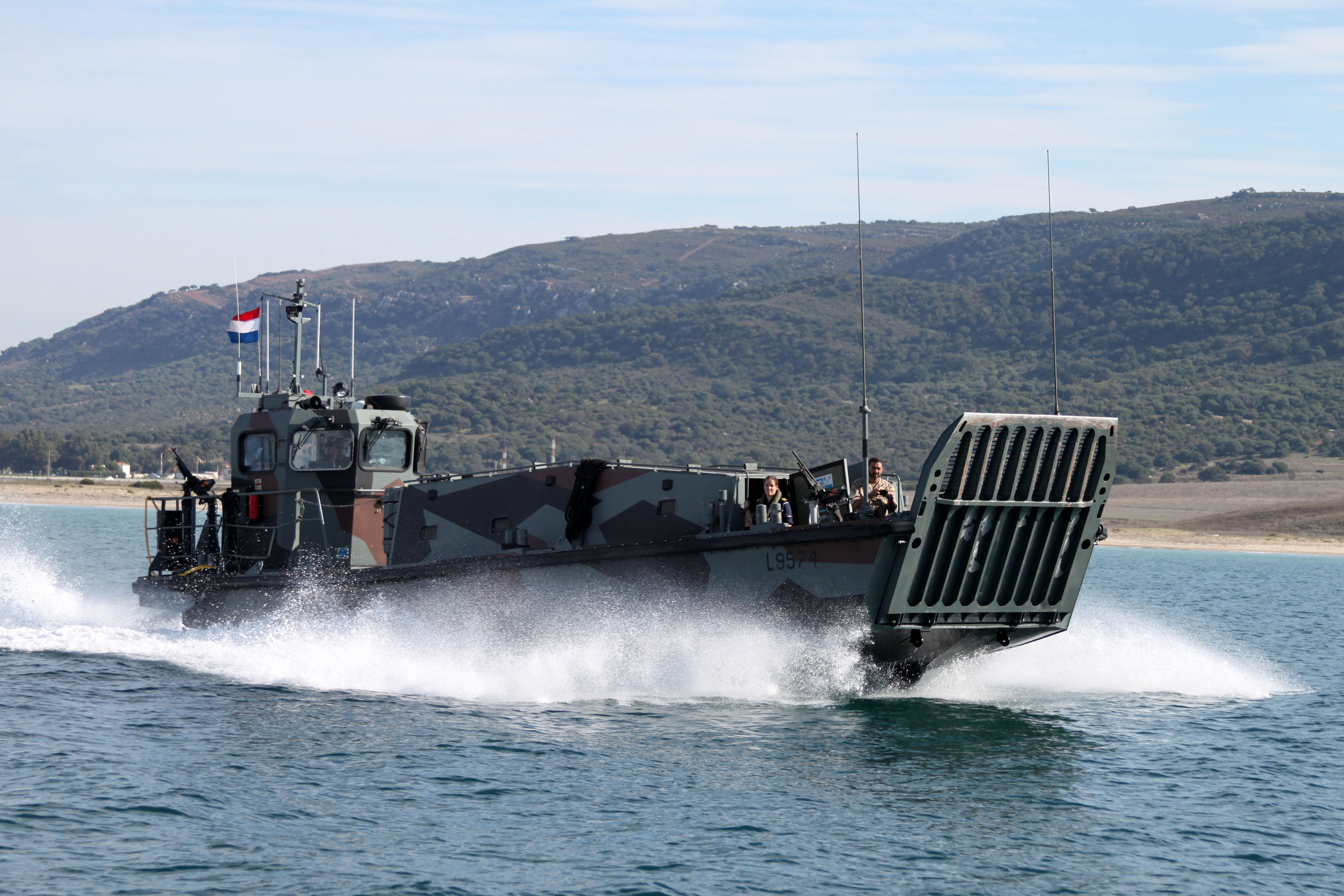

Class overview
- Name: (NL)LCVP Mk.V(C)
- Builders: Visser Shipyard, Den Helder
- Operators: Royal Netherlands Navy, Netherlands Marine Corps
- Preceded by: (NL)LCVP Mk.II; (NL)LCVP Mk.III
- In service: 2008-present
- Planned: 12
- Completed: 12
- Active: 12

General characteristics
- Type: Landing craft vehicle personnel
- Displacement: 24 tonnes (24 long tons)
- Length: 15.70 m (51 ft 6 in)
- Beam: 4.27 m (14 ft 0 in)
- Speed: 25 knots (46 km/h; 29 mph) (full load)
- Capacity: 35 troop, 8,200 kg (18,100 lb), 2x Land Rovers or a Bandvagn 206
- Complement: 3 crew
- Armament: 2× FN MAG (7.62mm) machine guns

The (NL)LCVP type Mk.V(C) were built as a replacement for the Mk.II and Mk.III. The contract for the construction and delivery of the twelve craft were signed on 13 December 2006 with Damen Shipyards Gorinchem. They were built in Den Helder by Visser shipyard, with the first four being delivered by 2009 and the last eight by 2011. The design of the Mk.V(C) is based on the British LCVP Mk5.

=== Crafts ===
Pennant no.	Builder	Status	Note
L9565	Visser Shipyard	In service	
L9566	Visser Shipyard	In service	
L9567	Visser Shipyard	In service	
L9568	Visser Shipyard	In service	
L9569	Visser Shipyard	In service	
L9570	Visser Shipyard	In service	
L9571	Visser Shipyard	In service	
L9572	Visser Shipyard	In service	
L9573	Visser Shipyard	In service	
L9574	Visser Shipyard	In service	
L9575	Visser Shipyard	In service	
L9576	Visser Shipyard	In service	

=== Replacement ===
The Mk.V(C) will be replaced from 2025 onwards with 12 new LCVP and 8 larger Littoral Craft Mobility (LCM). The replacement program has a budget of 100 to 250 million euro. In October 2025 it was reported that the Littoral Assault Craft (LAC) of the Finnish company Marine Alutech Oy Ab will replace the LCVP's. The LACs are expected to serve for around fifteen years in the RNLN.

== See also ==
- (NL)LCU
- Future of the Royal Netherlands Navy
