= Auxiliary ship replacement program =

Ship design project of the Royal Netherlands Navy

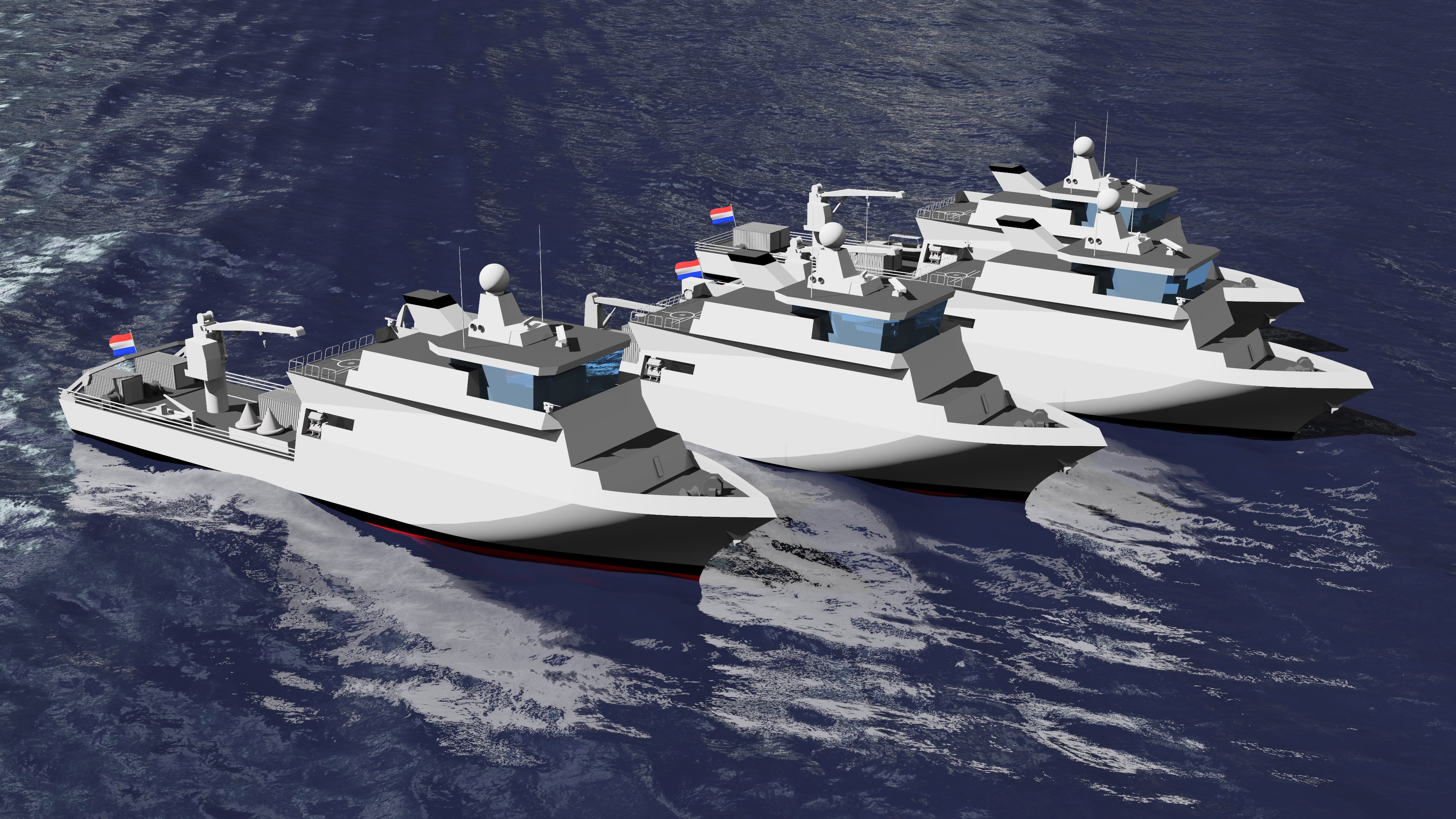
- Impression by DMO

Class overview
- Name: Auxiliary ship replacement program
- Operators: Royal Netherlands Navy
- Cost: €250 million to €1 billion (2023) (equivalent to €1.03 billion in 2025) for 8 units
- Planned: 4 Seagoing; 4 Coastal

General characteristics
- Propulsion: Methanol capable diesel engines
- Aircraft carried: 1x Unmanned aerial vehicle
- Aviation facilities: Hangar for a single UAV

The Auxiliary ship replacement program is set to replace ten auxiliary ships of the Royal Netherlands Navy from various classes by eight new ships which will be built by a Dutch shipyard.

== History ==
In 2020 the A-letter was sent by the Dutch Defence Materiel Administration (DMO) to the House of Representatives outlining the plans for the new ships. The program will consists of two variants, a coastal variant and an ocean going one. The first ship was supposed to enter service in 2024. But due to delays in the decision making this was pushed back. The B-letter followed in June 2022 specifying further details. For example that the ships need to be carbon neutral and that they need to be able to use methanol capable diesel engines. The new vessels are planned along the lines of the commercial off-the-shelf concept. In 2024 the builder will be announced in the D-letter, following a RfQ which will be sent out in 2023.

In February 2023 it was revealed that three major shipyards are interested in the project. These yards are the Damen Group, Royal IHC & Thecla Bodewes. Two smaller shipyards are also rumored to be interested in the program, but possible only for the building of the coastal version. These yards are Holland Shipyards & Neptune Marine.

=== Ocean going ===
The sea going variant will replace the five larger vessels:

Ship		Type	First in service	Expected end of life
HNLMS Mercuur (A900)		Submarine support vessel	1987	2026
HNLMS Van Kinsbergen (A902)		Training ship	1999	2024
Snellius class	HNLMS Snellius (A802)	Hydrographic survey vessel	2003	2033
Snellius class	HNLMS Luymes (A803)	Hydrographic survey vessel	2004	2034
HNLMS Pelikaan (A804)		Logistic support vessel	2006	2031

=== Coastal ===
The coastal variant will replace the five smaller vessels:

Ship		Type	First in service	Expected end of life
HNLMS Soemba (A850)		Diving support vessel	1989	2026 / 2027
Cerberus class	HNLMS Cerberus (A851)	Diving support vessel	1992	2026 / 2027
Cerberus class	HNLMS Argus (A852)	Diving support vessel	1992	2026 / 2027
Cerberus class	HNLMS Nautilus (A853)	Diving support vessel	1992	2026 / 2027
Cerberus class	HNLMS Hydra (A854)	Diving support vessel	1992	2026 / 2027

== See also ==
- Future of the Royal Netherlands Navy
