= Future of the Royal Netherlands Navy =

In April 2018, the Dutch Government approved a multi-year investment program for the Royal Netherlands Navy and allocated funds for the 2018–2030 period. The Materiel and IT Command (COMMIT) is in charge of the procurement of these new ships.

== Ships under construction ==
The following is a list of vessels currently under construction for the Royal Netherlands Navy:

Class	Ship	Pennant no.	Builder	Type	Displacement	Launched	Commissioning	Status	Source
Vlissingen-class	Vlissingen	M840	Kership	Mine Countermeasures Vessel	2,800 tonnes	29 September 2023	2025 (planned)	Fitting out	
Vlissingen-class	Scheveningen	M841	Giurgiu shipyard (hull); Kership (fitting out)	Mine Countermeasures Vessel	2,800 tonnes	5 November 2024	2026 (planned)	Under construction	
Vlissingen-class	IJmuiden	M842	Giurgiu shipyard (hull); Kership (fitting out)	Mine Countermeasures Vessel	2,800 tonnes		2027 (planned)	Under construction	
Vlissingen-class	Harlingen	M843	Giurgiu shipyard (hull); Kership (fitting out)	Mine Countermeasures Vessel	2,800 tonnes		2028 (planned)	Under construction	

== Surface combatants ==
=== De Zeven Provinciën-class frigate ===
==== Modernization ====
All four De Zeven Provinciën-class frigate will be modernised. Upgrades include acquisition Tomahawk cruise missiles, a new OtoMelara 127/64 LW canon, ESSM-2, new SMART-L MM/N, replacing the aging Goalkeeper CIWS with RIM-116 Rolling Airframe Missile.

==== Replacement ====
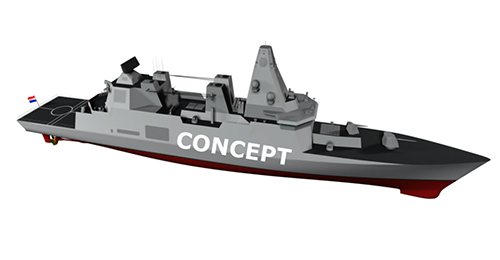
Artist impression of the FuAD

In 2020 it was announced that these intensively used ships will not be replaced as planned around 2025. The Royal Netherlands Navy and the German Navy will cooperate towards a joint platform design to replace both the De Zeven Provinciën-class frigate and the Sachsen-class frigate from 2030 onwards. In May 2026 it was reported that the Netherlands is considering equipping the new frigates with the American Aegis system.

=== ASWF-class frigates ===
==== Replacement ====
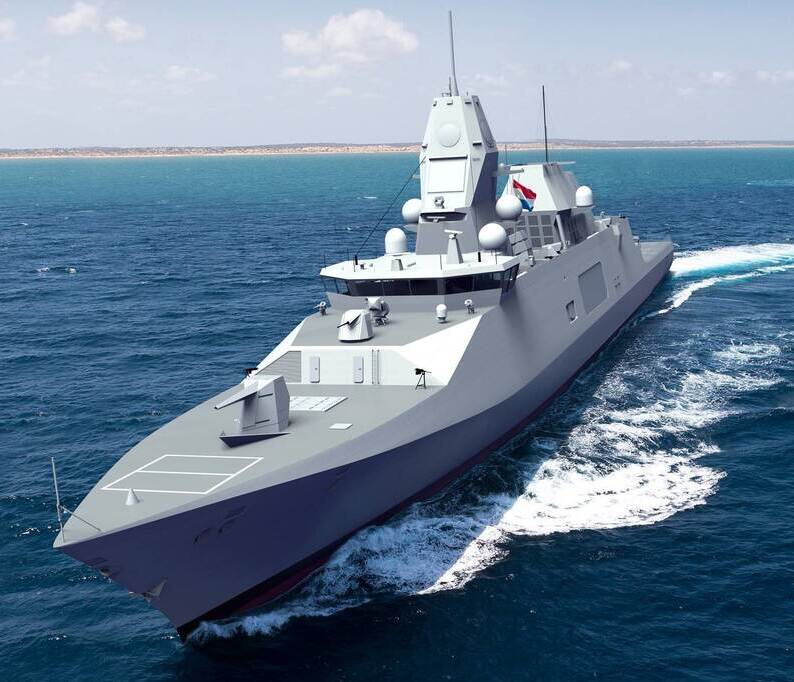
Artist impression of the ASW frigate

The two multipurpose M-frigates which are still in service with the Royal Netherlands Navy are reaching the end of their life; they were designed to last until 2018/2023. Because of this the Dutch Ministry of Defence started design studies in 2013. The new frigates are again planned to fulfill a general purpose role with anti-submarine warfare as their specialty. However, since the Netherlands Royal Navy only owns six frigates in total by 2017, the new ships have to be able to perform well in all areas of the spectrum. This means that anti-air equipment also has to be present, in the form of VLS (vertical launch)-cells carrying Standard Missile 2 or ESSM-projectiles. Due to budget cuts, the replacement program was delayed and is now projected to deliver the first ships in 2028–29.

On 5 September 2024, the Dutch Ministry of Defense released the 2024 Defense Memorandum which sees the Royal Netherlands Navy receiving 2 additional frigates, bringing the total order to 4 frigates for the Dutch navy.

=== Holland-class OPV ===
==== Replacement ====
In the 2022 Defense spending bill it was announced that at the end of their life cycle the four ships of the Holland-class will be replaced together with the two ships of the Rotterdam-class to form a new class of 'cross-over' ships with patrol-, amphibious- & emergency relief capabilities in mind.

== Amphibious warfare ==
=== Rotterdam-class LPDs ===
The two ships in the Rotterdam-class, the Rotterdam and the Johan de Witt have had several Updates. With the midlife update of Johan de Witt planned to take place in 2021–2022. Amongst other things the radars will be updated, with Thales NS100 radar & Thales Scout Mk3 replacing the Thales Variant radar & Kelvin Hughes radar.

- HNLMS Rotterdam is set to be replaced by 2030.
- HNLMS Johan de Witt is set to be replaced by 2032.

==== Replacement ====
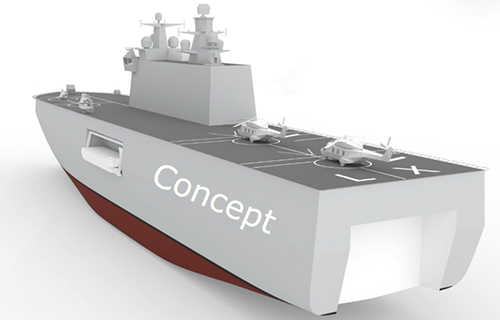
Artist impression of the ATS Program

In the 2022 Defense spending bill it was announced that at the end of their life cycle the two Rotterdam-class ships will be replaced together with the four ships of the Holland-class to form a new class of 'cross-over' ships with patrol-, amphibious- & emergency relief capabilities in mind. In June 2023, the Netherlands and British governments announced that the two countries would "explore opportunities" to jointly develop new specialist amphibious warships.

=== LCU's ===
==== Modernization ====
In 2023 the navy started with the MLU for 4 of the 5 LCU Mk.IIs to bring them to LCU Mk.III standards. LCU L9525 was sold. The first, L9528, was completed in January 2024.

==== Replacement ====
After the MLU the LCU's are expected to remain in service until at least 2032. After that they will get replaced. The A-letter for this is expected in 2024.

=== LCVP's ===
==== Replacement ====
Acquisition of new LCVPs from 2025 with additional capacity to support amphibious operations and the integration of the German Navy Marines (Seebatallion). In March 2023, a report to the Dutch Parliament outlined a plan for 12 Littoral Assault Craft (LAC) and 8 Littoral Craft Mobility (LCM) to replace the 12 existing light landing craft (Landing Craft Vehicles and Personnel - LCVP) and improve on their capability.

== Mine countermeasures vessel ==
=== Alkmaar-class MCM ships ===
The Netherlands and Belgium are doing a joint procurement for the replacements of the Alkmaar-class MCM ships. Both countries want to procure six new mine countermeasure (MCM) vessels, which makes for a total of 12 MCM ships. The new MCM ships will include a range of unmanned systems including unmanned surface, aerial and underwater vehicles alongside towed sonars and mine identification and neutralization ROVs.

==== Contenders ====
- The Franco-Belgium consortium made up of French shipbuilders STX France and Socarenam together with Belgium's EDR are bidding for the 12 new MCM vessels. Their plan includes the construction of MCM vessels named Sea Naval Solutions and a multi-role frigate named Deviceseas, which will serve as mothership to the MCM vessels. All ships will have a strong focus on autonomous systems operations.
- France's Naval Group and ECA Group established Belgian subsidiary Naval & Robotics and bid for the program.
- Imtech Belgium and Damen Group bid for the program.

==== Selection ====
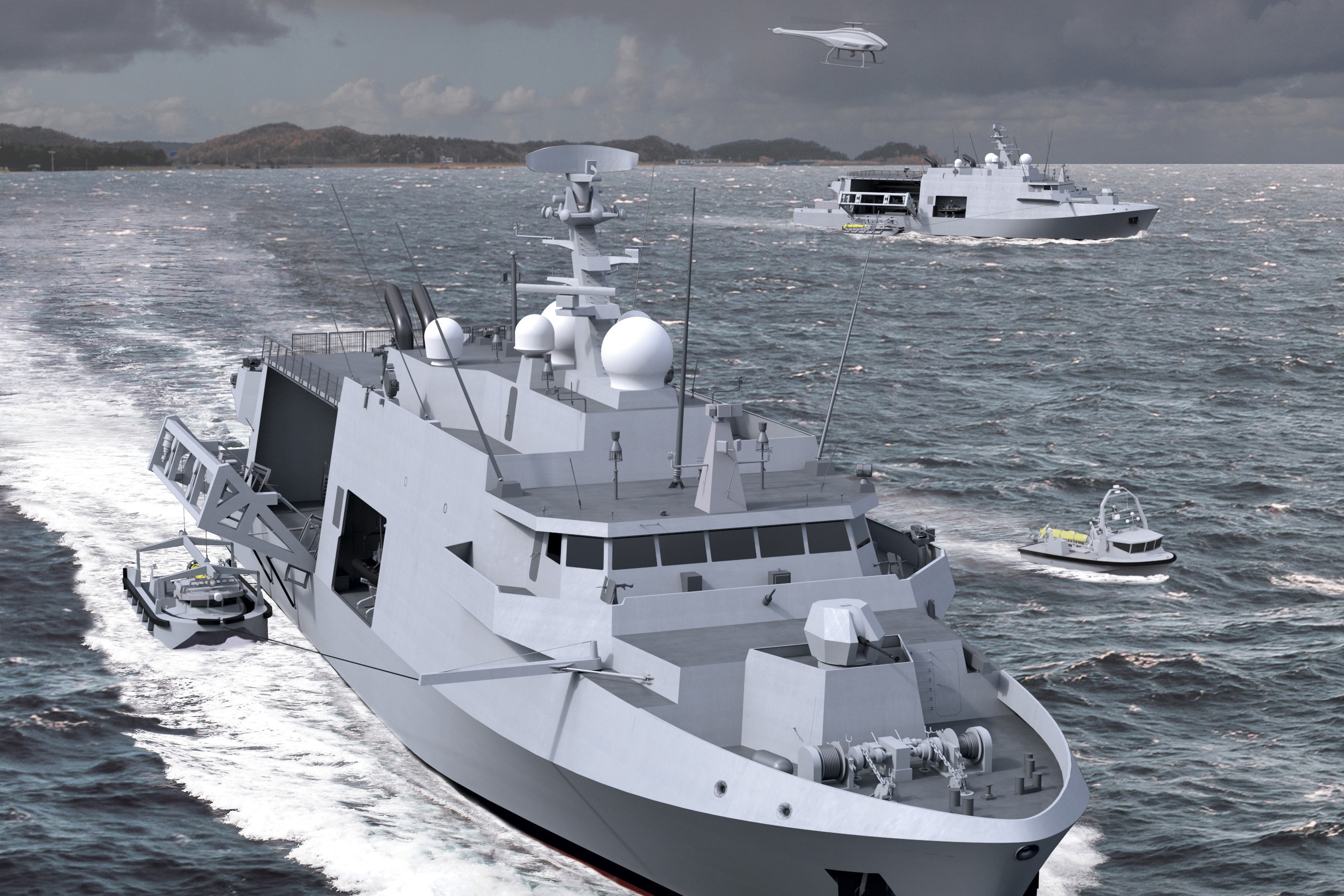
Artist impression of the Vlissingen-class

The contract was won by Naval Group on 15 March 2019. Delivery of the first ship to the Royal Netherlands Navy is anticipated in 2025.

==== Ships ====
The names for the six ships were announced during the keel laying ceremony for the first in class ship, Oostende.

Vlissingen-class
Pennant no.	Name	Status
M 840	Vlissingen	Under construction
M 841	Scheveningen	Under construction
M 842	IJmuiden	Under construction
M 843	Harlingen	Under construction
M 844	Delfzijl	Planned for 2028
M 845	Schiedam	Planned for 2030

== Submarines ==
=== Walrus-class submarines ===
In November 2014, the Dutch Minister of Defence announced plans to replace the Walrus-class submarines in 2025.

In April 2022 it was announced that the revised schedule for construction of the new replacement boats would likely see the first two vessels entering service in the 2034 to 2037 timeframe.

On 16 November 2022 the next phase in the program was started when DMO (predecessor of COMMIT) delivered the request for quotation to the three remaining yards. It is expected that the proposals will come in during the summer of 2023 with a final decision being made by the navy in late 2023 or early 2024.

==== Contenders ====
The Ministry of Defence has shortlisted three bidders:

- Damen Group and Saab Group announced that they have partnered from 2015 to jointly develop, offer and build next-generation submarines that are able to replace the current Walrus-class submarines. It was announced on 1 June 2018 that their design will be derived from the A26 submarine. The proposed submarine is around 73 metres (240 ft) long with a beam of 8 metres (26 ft). Furthermore, the displacement will be around 2,900 tonnes (2,900 long tons), with a complement of 34 to 42 people. The boat's armament includes 6 torpedo tubes and 1 multi-mission lock which can be used to deploy special forces.
- Naval Group announced that it is offering its newest submarine class, the Barracuda class, as replacement for the Walrus class. A version of the "Shortfin" diesel-electric variant Barracuda class was offered, rather than the nuclear variant used by the French Navy.
- ThyssenKrupp Marine Systems is planning to offer a Type 212CD submarine.

===== Failed bids =====
Spain's Navantia's S-80 was not accepted as a contender following the B-letter in 2019. In 2022 the Spanish Ministry of Defence send a letter to the DMO for Navantia to be allowed to put in an offer following a RfQ sent to the remaining contenders, in which some of the requirements have changed. It is rumoured that the request was denied by DMO.

===== Winning bid =====
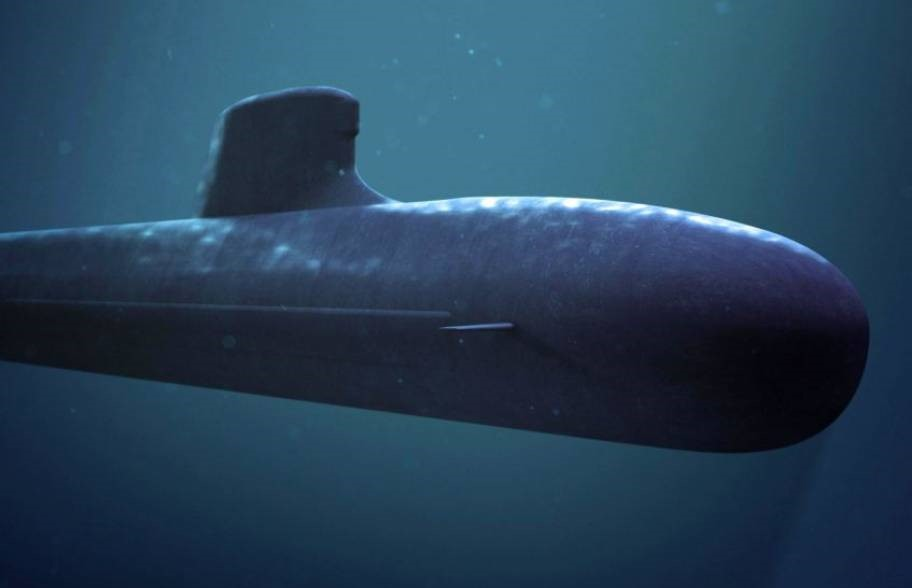
Artist impression of the Orka class

On 15 March 2024 State Secretary for Defence Christophe van der Maat officially announced that Naval Group has been selected as the winning bid. Prior to this announcement, the winner was already leaked to several media outlets, which caused political backlash for choosing a foreign yard over a Dutch one.

The names of the new submarines were also announced by van der Maat. The class will be known as the Orka class, with the subs named Orka, Zwaardvis, Barracuda and Tijgerhaai. The first two will be delivered within ten years after the contract has been signed.

== Auxiliary ships ==
=== Multifunctional Support Ship ===
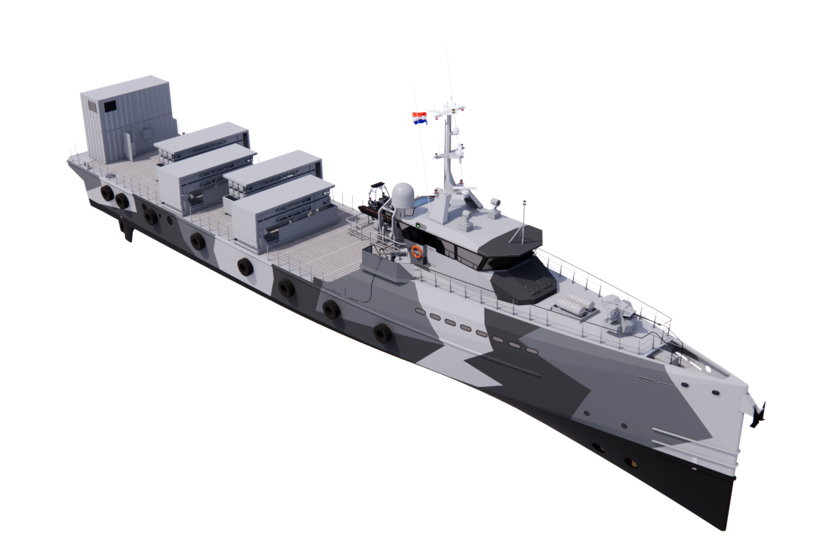
Artist impression of the Multifunctional Support Ship

On 23 November 2022 it was revealed that the navy is investigating the possibility of purchasing four commercially available offshore supply type vessels and use these ships as missile carriers. This program was known as The Rapidly Increased Firepower Capability (TRIFIC) and involves ships that would operate with a very small crew. The TRIFIC-vessels could carry up to six container units with eight or more missiles (depending on missile size). One or more of these ships would accompany another vessel like a frigate or an OPV and use the guiding systems and radars of these ships to attack targets.

In December 2023 the revised TRIFIC concept was announced as Modular Integrated Capability for ACDF and North Sea (MICAN). It was also revealed that instead of four ships, two are initially planned. Also the mission of the concept has changed, from solely being used as a missile carrier, to also being used as a Signals intelligence gathering vessel.

On 24 September 2024 State Secretary for Defence Gijs Tuinman gave an update on the MICAN-program, which was now named the Multifunctional Support Ship (MSS). He also announced the procurement for two ships.

=== Auxiliary ship replacement program ===
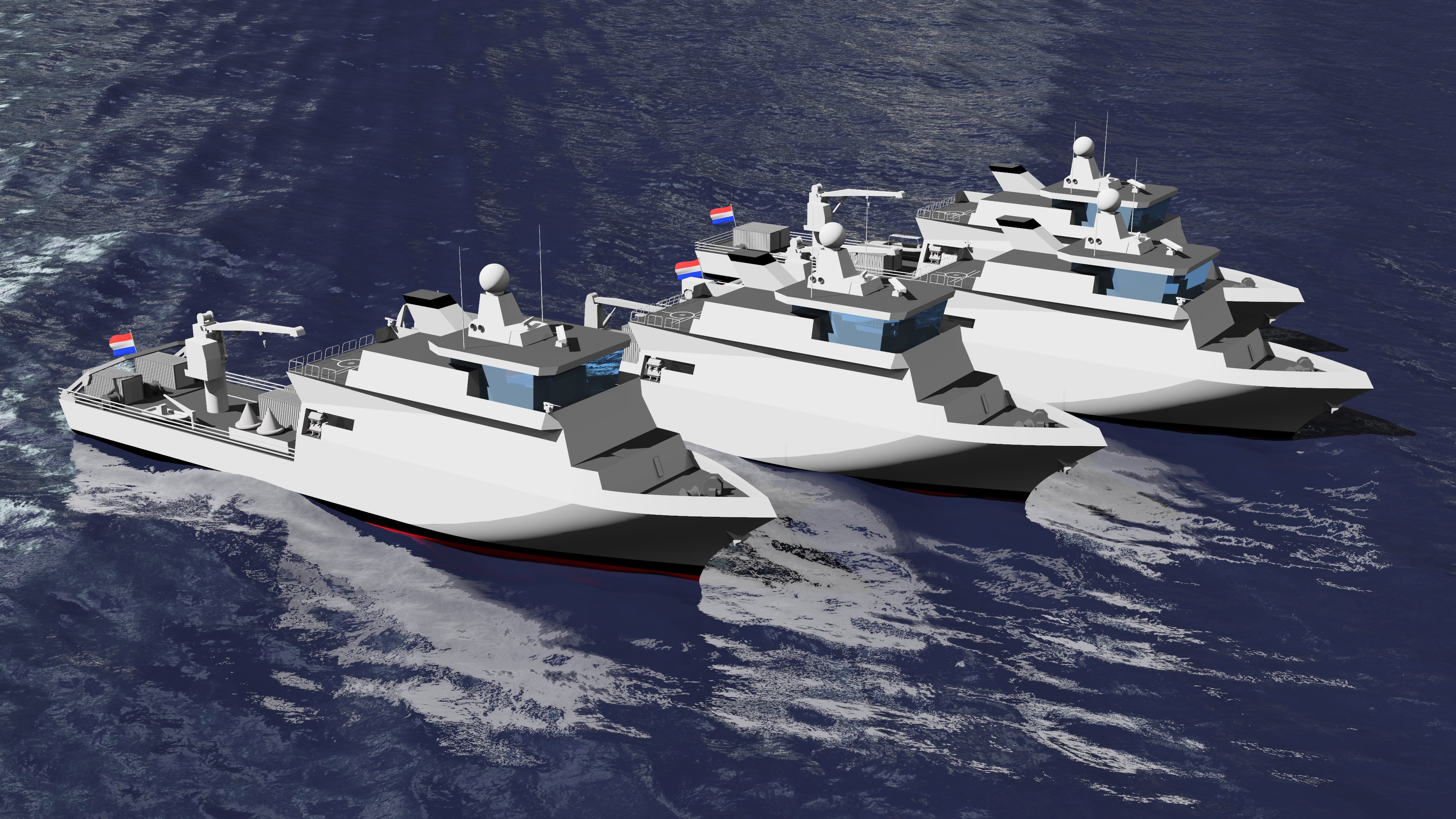
Artist impression of the ASR-program

Replacement of Mercuur, Pelikaan, the four diving support vessels of the Cerberus class (Cerberus, Argus, Nautilus, Hydra), the diving training vessel Soemba, the hydrographic vessels of the Snellius class (Snellius & Luymes) and the training vessel Van Kinsbergen from 2024 onwards. On 16 June 2022 it was announced in the B-letter that these ten vessels will be replaced by eight new ships of the same family. Four will be ocean going and the other four are for coastal or inland duties. These ships will be built by a Dutch shipyard which will be selected in 2024.

Ocean going

The sea going variant will replace the five larger vessels:

Ship		Type	First in service	Expected end of life
HNLMS Mercuur		Submarine support vessel	1987	2026
HNLMS Van Kinsbergen		Training ship	1999	2026
Snellius class	HNLMS Snellius	Hydrographic survey vessel	2003	2033
Snellius class	HNLMS Luymes	Hydrographic survey vessel	2004	2034
HNLMS Pelikaan		Logistic support vessel	2006	2031

Coastal

The coastal variant will replace the five smaller vessels:

Ship		Type	First in service	Expected end of life
HNLMS Soemba		Diving support vessel	1989	2026 / 2027
Cerberus class	HNLMS Cerberus	Diving support vessel	1992	2026 / 2027
Cerberus class	HNLMS Argus	Diving support vessel	1992	2026 / 2027
Cerberus class	HNLMS Nautilus	Diving support vessel	1992	2026 / 2027
Cerberus class	HNLMS Hydra	Diving support vessel	1992	2026 / 2027

== Minor vessels ==
=== Future Fast Interceptors ===
As part of the Future Fast Interceptors (FFI) program the Dutch Ministry of Defence signed a contract with De Haas shipyards to deliver 13 new fast crafts that will replace some FRISCs.

=== RHIB ===
The RHIB 700 rigid-hulled inflatable boat will be replaced by a new inflatable boat, which is called Alunaut. A total of 20 Alunauts were ordered on 23 September 2025.

=== Unmanned Surface Vessels ===
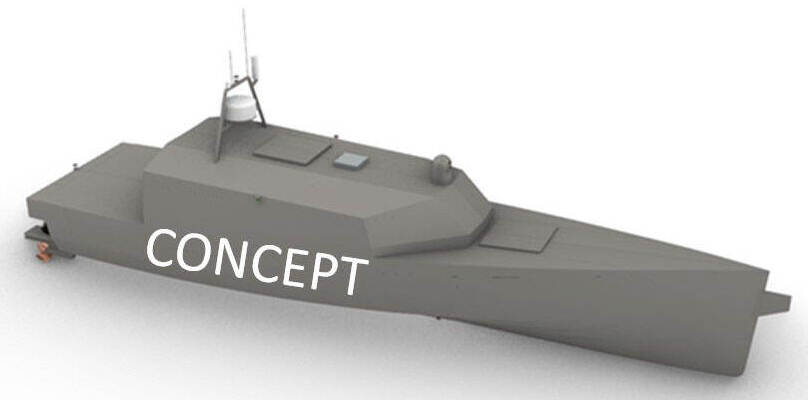
Artist impression

The navy is developing a 12 m (39 ft) unmanned surface vehicle as part of the toolkit for future ASW frigates. These USVs will be used to search for enemy submarines.

== Tugboats ==
=== New Midsize Harbour Tugboat ===
The navy is planning on replacing the Breezand class and HNLMS Gouwe with three new midsized harbour tugboats. They are going to be built by Neptune Marine in Hardinxveld-Giessendam and delivery of the first boat is planned for 2027. Contract signing took place on January 29, 2026. The class will known as Cumulus class.

== Aircraft ==
=== Helicopter ===
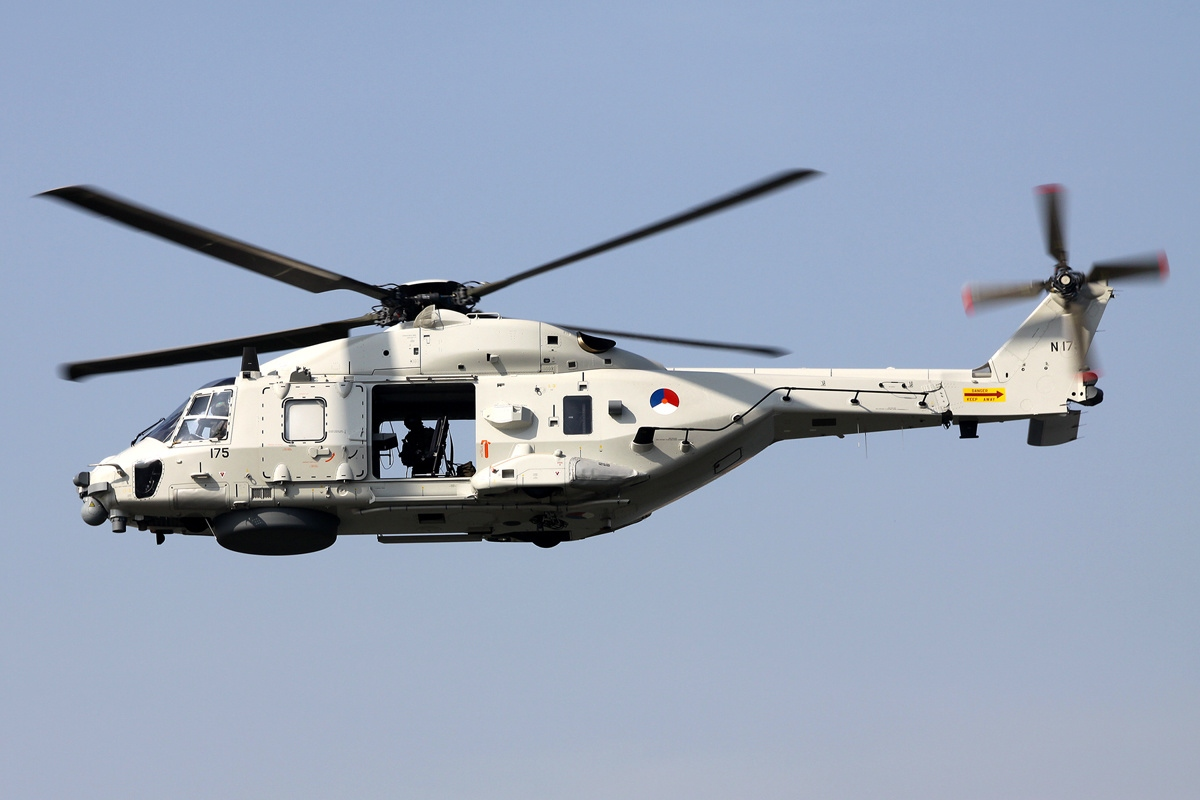
A NH90 NFH from the Royal Netherlands Navy

On 5 September 2024, the Dutch Ministry of Defense released the 2024 Defense Memorandum, in which it was outlined that the navy would receive an additional number of NHIndustries NH90 NFH maritime patrol helicopters.

=== UAV ===
==== UMS Skeldar V-200 ====
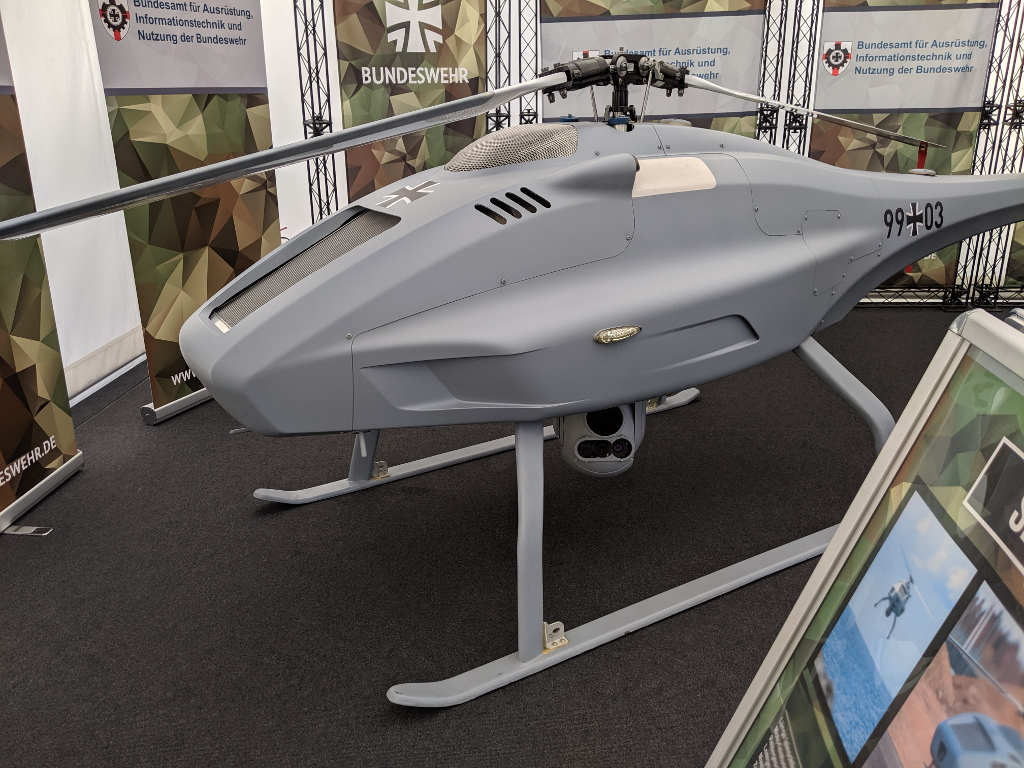
UMS Skeldar V-200

The Dutch navy together with its Belgian counterpart is buying an undisclosed amount of UMS Skeldar V-200 drones. These will be primarily used onboard the City-class mine countermeasures vessel for communication between the mothership and the USVs. Or use lidar to search for mines just below the surface.

==== High Eye Airboxer ====
On 14 May 2024 it was announced that COMMIT was going to purchase an undisclosed amount of High Eye Airboxer drones for use by the navy.

==== C-UAS interceptor drones ====
In August 2026 it was reported that the RNLN plans to acquire counter-unmanned aircraft systems (C-UAS) based on the Destinus Hornet B2 interceptor.

== See also ==
- List of active Royal Netherlands Navy ships
- Future of the Royal Navy
- Future of the Royal Australian Navy
- Future of the Brazilian Navy
- Future of the French Navy
- Future of the Indian Navy
- Future of the Russian Navy
- Future of the United States Navy
- Future of the Spanish Navy

== Citations ==
=== Further reading ===
- John Hill (5 July 2024). "Dutch Navy looks to fit air defence payload to 'civil' ships". Naval Technology.
