= Multifunctional Support Ship =

Ship design project of the Royal Netherlands Navy

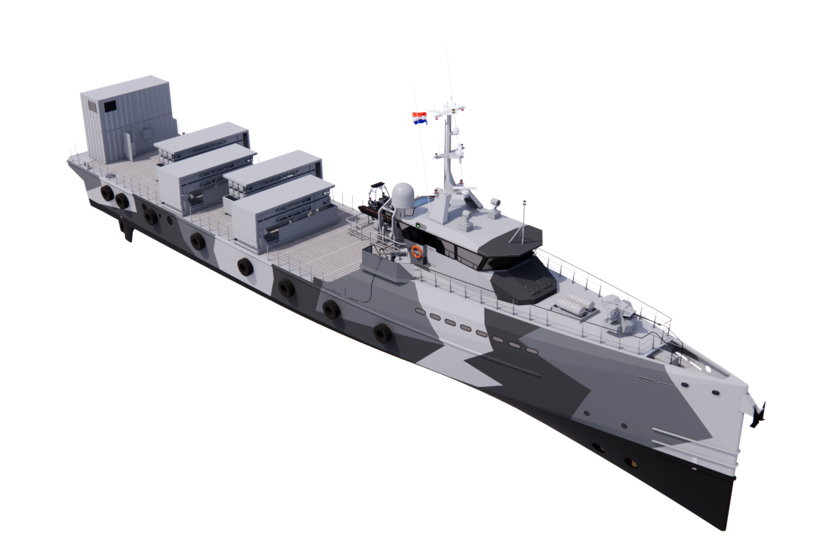
- Impression of the MSS concept

Class overview
- Name: Multifunctional Support Ship (MSS)
- Builders: Damen Group
- Operators: Royal Netherlands Navy
- Cost: €250 million to €1 billion (for 2 units)
- In commission: 2026 onwards (planned)
- Planned: 2

General characteristics
- Type: Missile Carrier / Signals intelligence gathering vessel
- Length: 53.20 m (174.5 ft)
- Beam: 9.80 m (32.2 ft)
- Draught: 3.50 m (11.5 ft)
- Speed: 27 knots (50 km/h; 31 mph)
- Boats & landing craft carried: 1 × rigid-hull inflatable boats
- Complement: 8 (accommodation for up to 14)
- Electronic warfare & decoys: Containerized ECM/ESM
- Armament: Fixed armament; 1 × remote weapon system; 2 × .50 caliber heavy machine guns; Modular armament; 4 × containerized 6-cell Barak ER systems; IAI Harop loitering munition
- Notes: Measurements based on the FSC 5009.

The Multifunctional Support Ship (MSS), also known as the MSS (formerly TRIFIC & MICAN) is a project of the Royal Netherlands Navy (RNLN, Dutch: Koninklijke Marine). it was announced on 23 November 2022 by Captain (E) Paul Flos, head of maritime systems at COMMIT. On 24 September 2024 an announcement was made by State Secretary for Defence Gijs Tuinman that two ships will be procured from the Damen Group. Both ships should be in service by 2027.

== History ==
On 23 November 2022 it was revealed that the Dutch navy was investigating the possibility of purchasing four commercially available offshore supply type vessels and use these as missile carriers. This program, when first announced, was known as The Rapidly Increased Firepower Capability (TRIFIC) and involved ships that would operate with a very small crew. The TRIFIC-vessels can carry up to six container units with eight or more vertical launch cells (depending on missile size) in each container. One or more of these ships would accompany another vessel like a frigate or an OPV and use the guiding systems and radars of these ships to attack targets.

In December 2023 the revised TRIFIC concept was announced as MICAN. It was also revealed that instead of four ships, two were initially planned.

On 24 September 2024 State Secretary for Defence Gijs Tuinman gave an update on the MICAN-program, which was now named the Multifunctional Support Ship (MSS). He also announced the procurement for two ships.

== Concept evolution ==
=== TRIFIC concept ===
The Rapidly Increased Firepower Capability Royal Netherlands Navy (TRIFIC) ships were envisioned to stay close (around 5 nmi (9.3 km)) to a mother ship and give extra missile capability. The ship would rely on the radars, missile guidance and defence from an external source like the Future Air Defender, De Zeven Provinciën class, Holland class or the ASW frigate acting as mother ship.

==== Stage 1 ====
The first stage of the TRIFIC-program was to develop a ship with a low crew. The ship would be around 60 m (200 ft) to 70 m (230 ft) and based on a commercially available offshore supply vessel. Crew was required on these ships to keep a man-in-the-loop to actually fire the missiles.

==== Stage 2 ====
In stage two it was planned for the ships to sail themselves, with a minimal crew to keep a man-in-the-loop.

==== Stage 3 ====
In stage three the ships would be fully autonomous accompanying the mother ships.

==== Armament ====
===== Missiles =====
DMO has spoken to several countries, including Israel, America and France to supply an array of missiles in the short term. The type of missiles is not limited to Surface-to-air or cruise missiles. Also the possibility to equip the ships with loitering munition is being investigated.

===== Countermeasure =====
Being very modular by design it, is also possible to load units with a soft kill capability, for example electronic warfare units.

=== MICAN concept ===
The Modular Integrated Capability for ACDF and North Sea (MICAN) concept was announced in December 2023 as a revised plan from the original TRIFIC concept. The plan still involves buying COTS offshore supply vessels, but instead of four, two ships are planned. Also the mission of the concept has changed, from solely being used as a missile carrier, to being able to carry sensors and systems to investigate (potential) threats on the North Sea. This task was added in response to a Russian spy ship, the Admiral Vladimirsky, that was seen in the Dutch EEZ on multiple occasions. The new mission is to monitor such vessels and see what they are up to below the surface.

==== Payload ====
Payloads that are being considered are:

- Containerized VLS with SAM
- Containerized SSM
- Loitering munition
- Containerized ECM/ESM

=== Multifunctional Support Ships ===
On 24 September 2024 State Secretary for Defence Gijs Tuinman gave an update on the MICAN-program, which was now named the Multifunctional Support Ship (MSS). He also announced the procurement for the first two ships. With insiders telling Marineschepen.nl that more ships are being considered if the program is a success. The two ships will be a militarized version of a fast crew supplier from Damen, most likely the Fast Crew Supplier 5009 (FCS 5009). Besides being a missile carrier for a mother ship, the ships themselves can also be used to patrol the North Sea.

==== Payload ====
Weapon Payloads that are selected so far are:

- Containerized Barak ER SAM
- Containerized IAI Harop loitering munition
- Containerized ECM/ESM

== List of ships ==
Pennant no.	Name	Builder	Laid down	Launched	Commissioned	Status	Notes
TBA	TBA	Damen Group	-	-	2026 (planned)	Announced	
TBA	TBA	Damen Group	-	-	2027 (planned)	Announced	

== See also ==
- Future of the Royal Netherlands Navy
- Future Air Defender
- Large Unmanned Surface Vehicle
