= HNLMS Den Helder =

Fast combat support ship of Royal Netherlands Navy

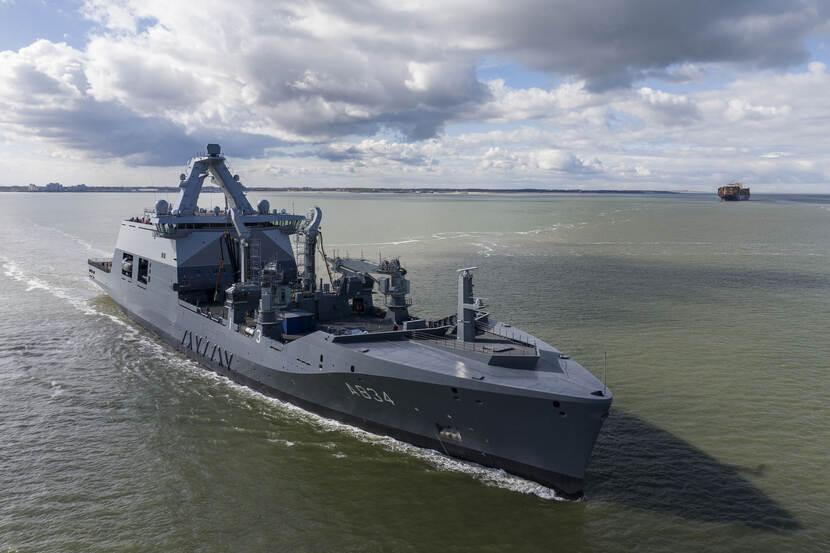

Class overview
- Name: Den Helder class
- Builders: Damen Schelde Naval Shipbuilding Damen Shipyards Galați
- Operators: Royal Netherlands Navy
- Preceded by: HNLMS Amsterdam
- Cost: €374 million (2019) (equivalent to €434 million in 2025)
- Built: 2020–2025
- Planned: 1
- Completed: 1
- Active: 1

History

Netherlands
- Name: Den Helder
- Namesake: City of Den Helder
- Awarded: 19 February 2020
- Builder: Damen Schelde Naval Shipbuilding Damen Shipyards Galați
- Cost: €374 million (2019) (equivalent to €434 million in 2025)
- Yard number: 312421000 / 421000
- Laid down: 2 June 2021
- Launched: October 2022
- Christened: 22 February 2025
- Commissioned: 1 October 2025
- Home port: Den Helder
- Identification: Pennant number: A834; IMO number: 4763959; MMSI number: 244936000
- Status: In active service
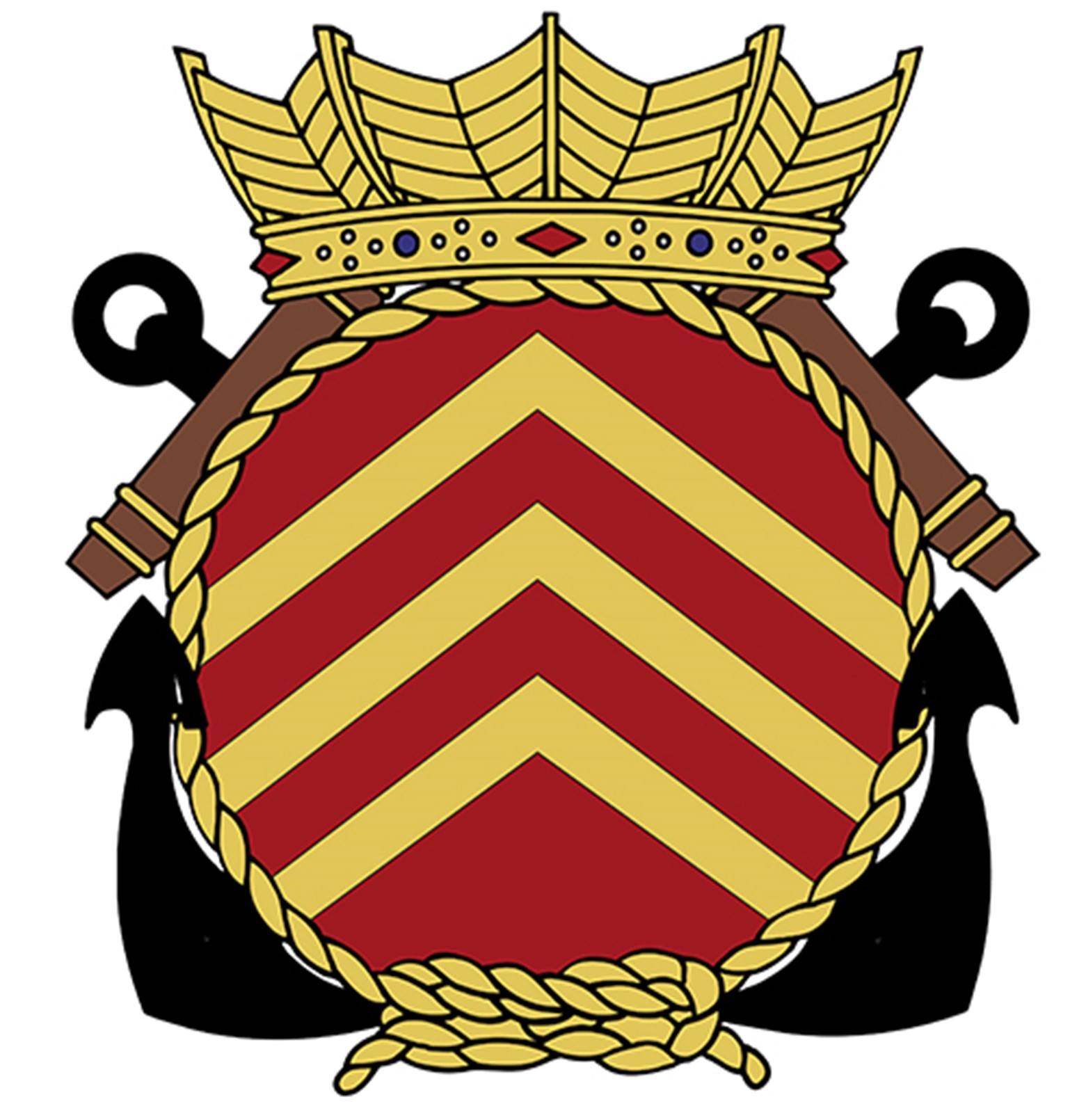
- Badge

General characteristics
- Type: Replenishment oiler
- Displacement: 20,000 t (19,684 long tons)
- Length: 179.5 m (588 ft 11 in) o/a
- Beam: 22 m (72 ft 2 in)
- Draught: 8 m (26 ft 3 in)
- Propulsion: 4 × Wärtsila 31; 2 x GE Vernova electric motors
- Speed: 20 knots (37 km/h; 23 mph)
- Boats & landing craft carried: 2 × LCVPs in davits
- Complement: 75 (plus 75 people)
- Sensors & processing systems: Thales NS100 Air & Surface radar; Thales Pharos-radar
- Armament: 1 x OTO Melara 76 mm gun, incl. DART ammunition; 1 × RAM RIM-116, 21 missiles each; 4 x 12.7 mm Lion Fish
- Aircraft carried: 2 NH90 NFH (medium sized helicopters)

HNLMS Den Helder is a new replenishment oiler of the Royal Netherlands Navy. Also known as the Combat Support Ship (CSS), Den Helder is planned to fill the gap of replenishment at sea that was left after HNLMS Amsterdam was sold to Peru in 2014. The design is based on the Karel Doorman.

== Development ==
The sale of HNLMS Amsterdam in 2014 left a gap in the navy's ability to replenish its own ships and those of allies. The successor of HNLMS Zuiderkruis, HNLMS Karel Doorman, was the only replenishment oiler in the fleet, additional dedicated Fleet Combat Support was required. In 2017 a study started to look at the possibility of a new tanker to fulfill this task.

In 2019 the so called D-letter, the final process before the contract can be signed, was sent to the Tweede Kamer for approval. With the contract signing following two months later on the bridge of HNLMS Karel Doorman. During Prinsjesdag in 2022 it was announced that the Den Helder would be equipped with a close-in weapon system (CIWS), which later was confirmed to be the same CIWS that will be installed on the Anti-Submarine Warfare Frigate and the HNLMS Karel Doorman. A year later, in 2023, it was reported that the Den Helder will not be equipped with several systems for self defense that were previously planned as a result of austerity measures.

== Capabilities ==
The ship carries two 40-ton cranes and can carry up to 24 sea containers. It can dispense 7,600 cubic metres (2,000,000 US gal; 1,700,000 imp gal; 7,600,000 L) of diesel (including for its own use), 1,000 m^{3} (260,000 US gal; 220,000 imp gal; 1,000,000 L) of helicopter fuel (including for its own use), 226 m^{3} (60,000 US gal; 50,000 imp gal; 226,000 L) of drinking water and 434 tons of other goods, including ammunition.

The ship accommodates two NH90 NFH helicopters or, alternatively, one NH90 NFH and two UAVs. It carries two LCVPs (Landing craft vehicle personnel) and 2 FRISC (Fast Raiding Intercepting Special Forces Craft).

The ship's infirmary operates as a Role 2 hospital (providing limited hospital capability, including surgery). The radios aboard the Den Helder are made by Rohde & Schwarz Benelux.

=== Naming ===
The name was revealed in a ceremony in honor of the 10.000th ship model, which was the new CSS, made at MARIN. In attendance were the Commander of the Royal Netherlands Navy: Rob Kramer, the State Secretary for Defence: Barbara Visser, the State Secretary for Economic Affairs and Climate Policy: Mona Keijzer and the CEO of Damen Schelde Naval Shipbuilding.

It is the first time a vessel is named after the city of Den Helder, which is home to the Netherlands main naval base.

=== Construction ===
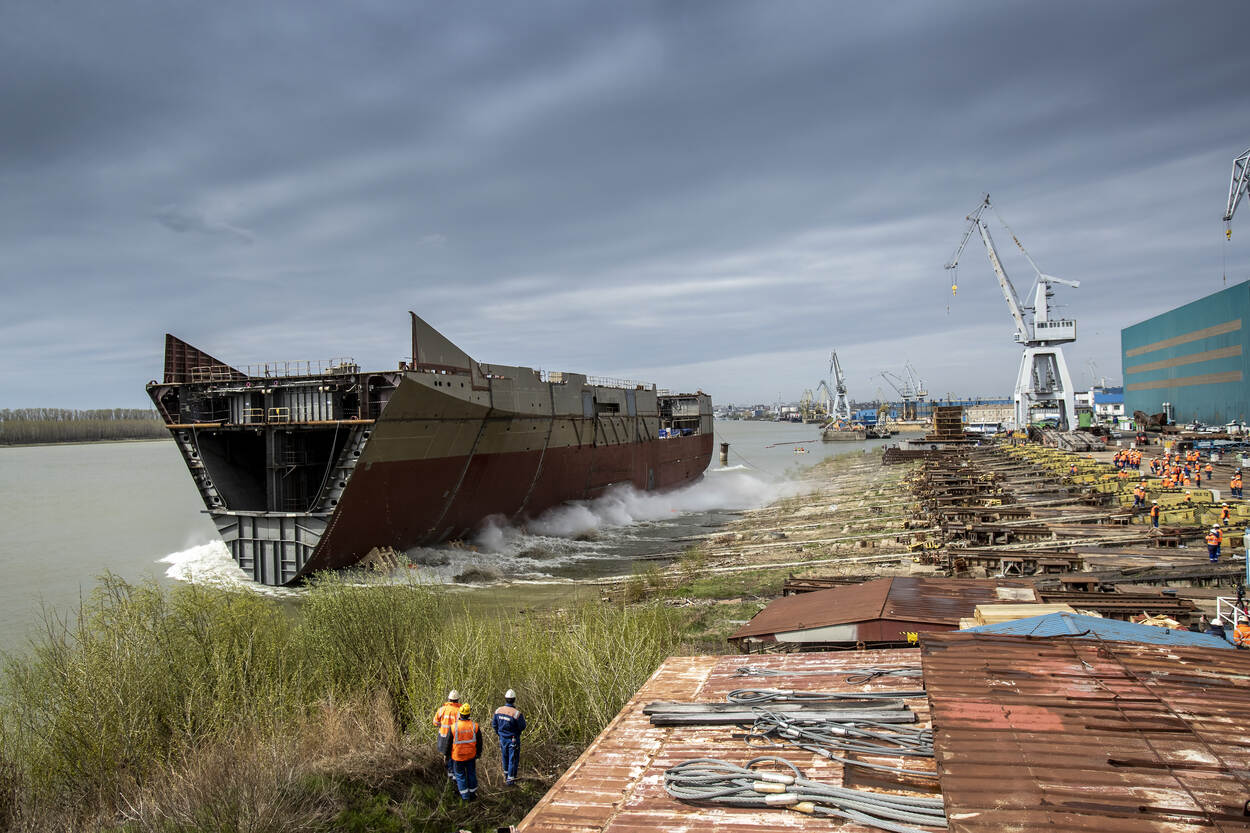
Launch of hull sections 2 & 3

The first steel was cut in a ceremony on 2 December 2020 at the Damen yard in Galați. On 2 June Damen Shipyards Galați has performed the keel-laying ceremony on the Combat Support Ship (CSS) Den Helder. The keel-laying ceremony was performed by the Director Defence Material Organisation (DMO), vice admiral Arie Jan de Waard and vice admiral Rob Kramer, Commander Royal Netherlands Navy (RNLN). The ship was formally laid down on 2 June 2021. The first major section, measuring 90 m (300 ft), of the new vessel was launched in Galați on 11 April 2022. The assembled ship was floated and moved to another part of the building dock in October 2022 with work expected to continue through 2023. Sea trials are anticipated in early 2024.

In October 2023 it was reported that Damen had delivered a virtual reality version of HNLMS Den Helder to the Materiel and IT Command (COMMIT), which can be used to train the new crew. The same month the diesel generators were started for the first time aboard the ship.

On 16 November 2024 the Den Helder left Damen Shipyards Galați and began its journey to the Netherlands, where the ship will be fitted out. During its journey to the Netherlands the ship will perform its sea trials. These sea trials were initially planned to be done in the Black Sea, but because of Russo-Ukrainian War it was instead decided to do this during the journey from the Galați shipyard to the Netherlands. After arriving in the Netherlands the ship will be fitted out at Damen facilities in Vlissingen and Den Helder. On 12 December 2024 Den Helder docked briefly at Den Helder to pick up equipment and goods that are needed for the completion of the ship. The next day, on 13 December, Den Helder arrived at the Damen Naval shipyard in Vlissingen to complete its final outfitting ahead of delivery. The ship is planned to be delivered to COMMIT in spring 2025. On 22 February 2025 Den Helder was christened by Princess Amalia. The vessel began initial sea trials in November 2024 which continued as part of her final fit out in the Netherlands. She was delivered to the navy in March 2025.

Between 13 and 18 July 2025 Den Helder performed sea trials at the Channel.

On 1 October 2025 Den Helder was commissioned. While the ship has been commissioned it will take until 2026 for her to become fully operational.

== Service history ==
On 5 October 2025 Den Helder left the Nieuwe Haven Naval Base for the Dutch Caribbean. While in the Caribbean Den Helder underwent warm-weather trials until mid-november. She also visited the ports of Norfolk and New York. After her stay in Curaçao she will return to the Netherlands. On 24 December 2025 she arrived in Den Helder.

In January 2026 Den Helder left the Nieuwe Haven Naval Base for the Baltic Sea to perform cold weather trials. During the trials fifteen systems were inspected on board the Den Helder, while she sailed through pancake ice. At the same measuring equipment was installed in a quarter of all spaces on board the ship to check whether the values remained within the specified limits. After completing these trials and visiting Bergen, she returned on 14 February at the naval base in Den Helder.

On 31 May 2026 Den Helder left the Nieuwe Haven Naval Base to join Standing NATO Maritime Group 1 (SNMG1). She will be part of SNMG1 for approximately seven weeks.

== Similar ships ==
- Aotearoa class
- Protecteur class
- Supply class
- Tide class
- Vulcano class

== See also ==
- Future of the Royal Netherlands Navy
