= Future Surface Combatant =

Future Surface Combatant is the designation of shipbuilding programs for:

- Future Surface Combatant (Koninklijke Marine), the Netherlands and Belgium
- Future Surface Combatant (Royal Navy), United Kingdom
- Future Surface Combatant (U.S. Navy) or DDG(X), United States
