= Cerberus-class diving support vessel =

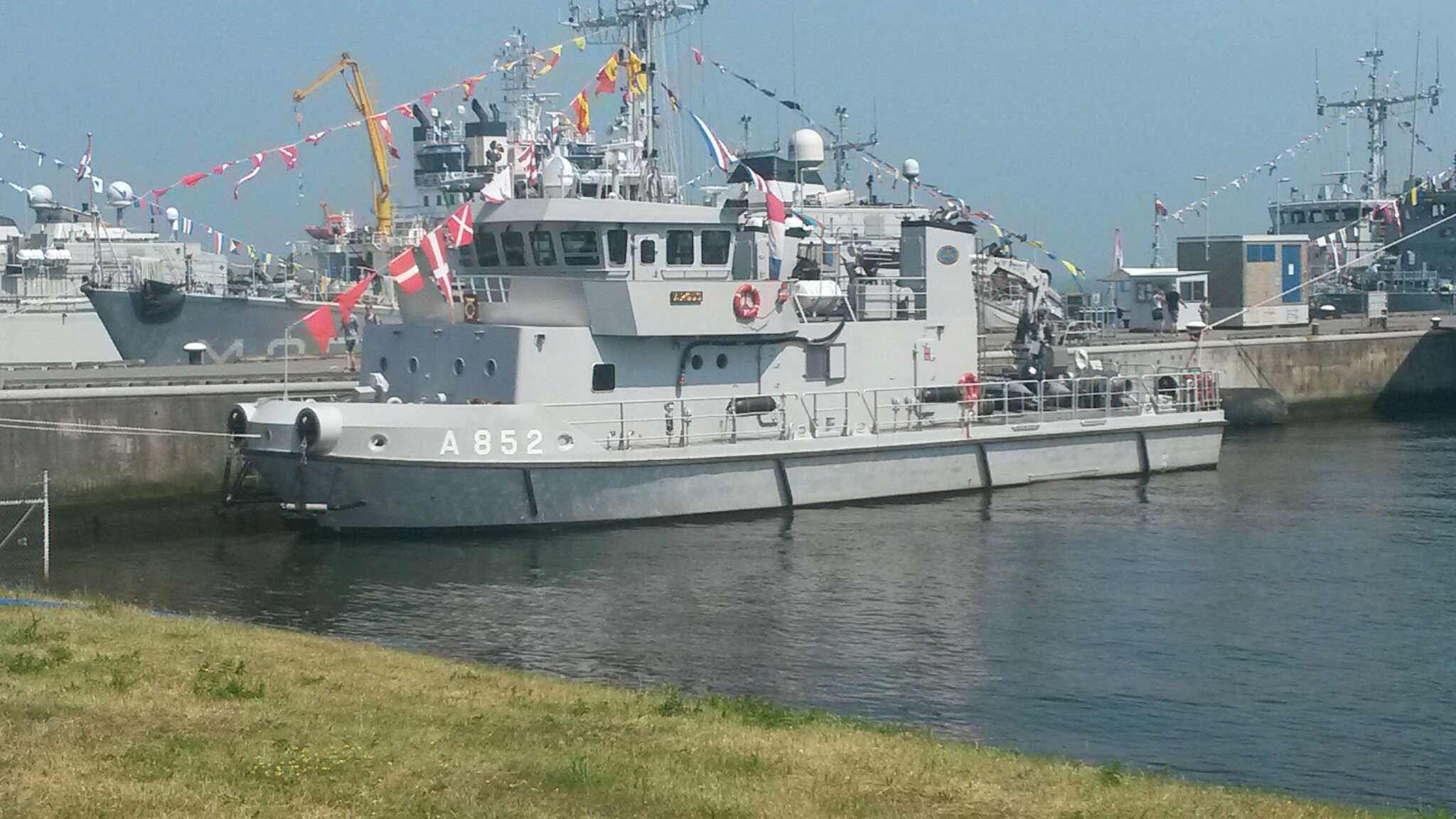
- HNLMS Argus during the 2015 naval days in Den Helder

Class overview
- Name: Cerberus class
- Builders: Scheepswerf Visser (now Damen Den Helder)
- Operators: Royal Netherlands Navy
- Preceded by: Triton class; Dokkum class
- In commission: 1992–present
- Planned: 4
- Completed: 4
- Active: 4

General characteristics
- Type: Diving support vessel
- Displacement: 223 t
- Length: 27.94 m (91 ft 8 in)
- Beam: 8.76 m (28 ft 9 in)
- Height: 13.2 m (43 ft 4 in)
- Draft: 1.50 m (4 ft 11 in)
- Propulsion: 2 × Volvo Penta TADM 122A
- Speed: 10.5 knots (19.4 km/h; 12.1 mph)
- Crew: 6

The Cerberus class are four diving support vessels in service with the Royal Netherlands Navy. Built by Scheepswerf Visser at Den Helder, their mission is to help the explosive ordnance disposal unit with bomb disposal and to serve as a platform to train new navy divers.

== Ships in class ==
Hull number	Name	Builder	Commissioned	Status	Badge	Notes
A851	Cerberus	Scheepswerf Visser	28 February 1992	In active service		
A852	Argus	Scheepswerf Visser	2 June 1992	In active service		
A853	Nautilus	Scheepswerf Visser	18 August 1992	In active service		
A854	Hydra	Scheepswerf Visser	20 November 1992	In active service		

== Construction and career ==
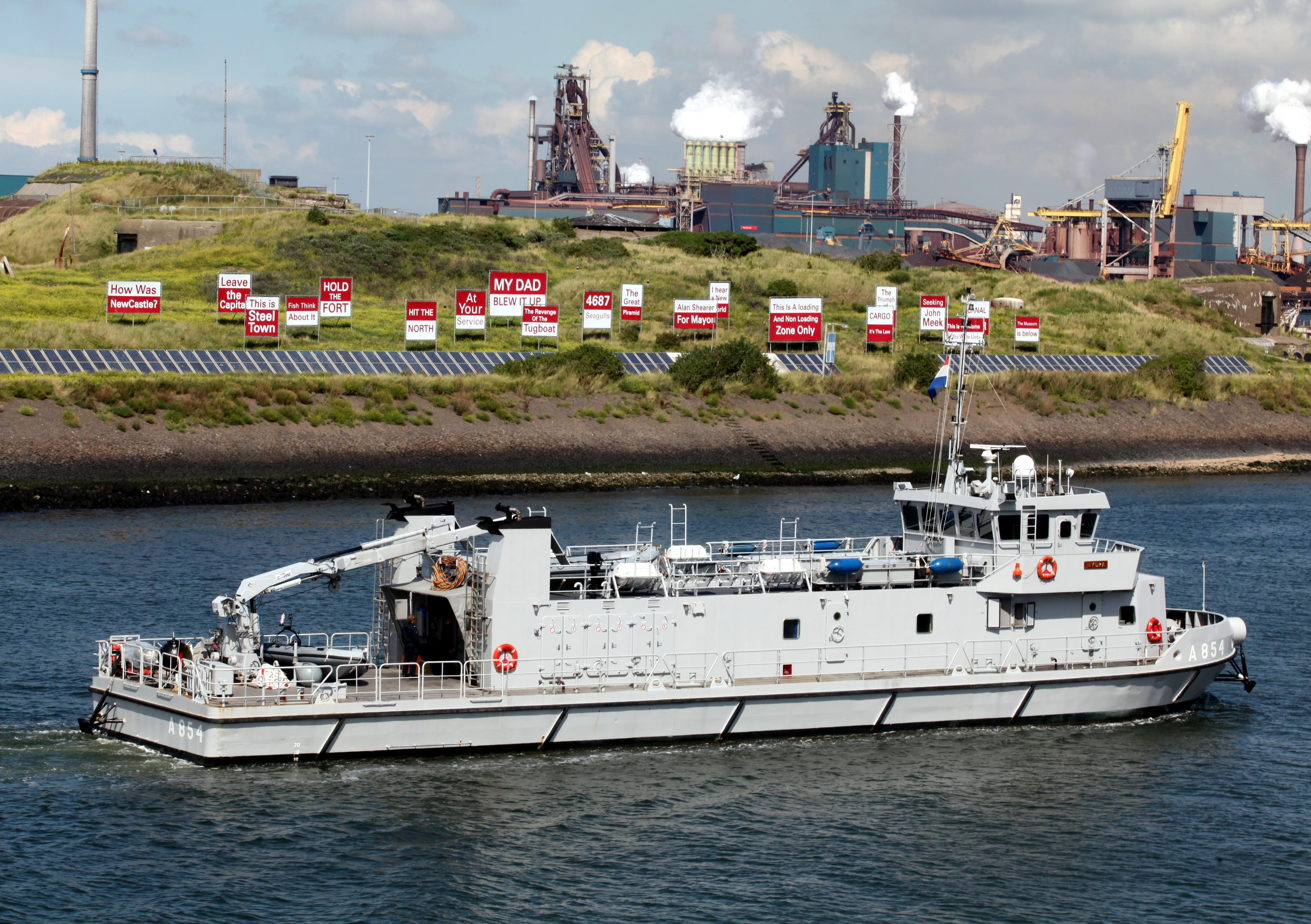
Hydra with the 10.5-metre (34 ft) extension.

Two of the ships have undergone modifications since being commissioned. In 1997 Hydra received a 10.5-metre (34 ft) extension in the mid-section and a new bow thruster among other things. The lengthening gave here a new displacement of 340 t. Nautilus followed with the same modifications in 2008. As a result, these two ships can carry an additional 2 crew and 22 passengers.

All ships are set to be replaced along with the Mercuur, Pelikaan, Snellius class, Soemba and the Van Kinsbergen by a common family of ships. The builder of the new ships will be selected in 2024.
