= Future Air Defender =

Ship design project of the Royal Netherlands Navy and German Navy

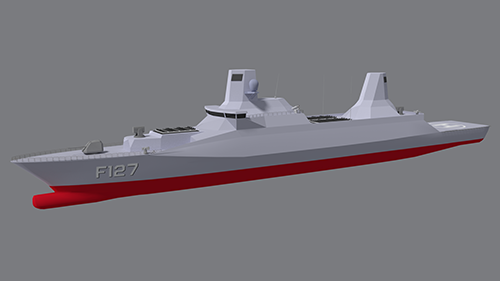
- Early impression of the FuAD by MTG in 2020

Class overview
- Name: Future Air Defender (FuAD)
- Builders: ThyssenKrupp Marine Systems/Lürssen
- Operators: Royal Netherlands Navy; German Navy
- Preceded by: De Zeven Provinciën-class frigate; Sachsen-class frigate
- Planned: 4 - Netherlands; 6 - Germany
- Canceled: 6 (Germany)

General characteristics
- Type: Ballistic Missile Defense (BMD) frigate
- Displacement: 10,000 tonnes
- Length: 160 m (524 ft 11 in)
- Beam: 21 m (68 ft 11 in)
- Draught: 5.5 m (18 ft 1 in)
- Speed: 32 kn (59 km/h; 37 mph)
- Range: 4,000 nmi (7,400 km; 4,600 mi)
- Endurance: 30 days
- Sensors & processing systems: Thales Smart L MM/N
- Armament: 1 × OTO 127/64; 2 x 32 Mk 41 VLS (64 cells); 2 × 21-cell (42 cells total) RIM-116 RAM CIWS launchers; 8 × Kongsberg NSM Block 1a anti-ship and land attack missiles; autocannons remote controlled machine guns

The Future Air Defender (FuAD) was a joint program from the Dutch and German navies to find a common replacement for both the De Zeven Provinciën and the Sachsen-class frigate. The joint German-Dutch programme was cancelled in November 2023.

The German Navy decided to pursue its own project with the F127 Frigate based on the MEKO A400 AMD.

== History ==
On 17 December 2020 the Dutch Secretary for Defence Barbara Visser and her German counterpart Benedikt Zimmer signed an agreement to jointly work towards a replacement for the De Zeven Provinciën and Sachsen-class frigate.

This program isn't the first time that the Netherlands and Germany have worked together on a new frigate class. They also collaborated on the classes that this program is set to replace in the Trilateral Frigate Cooperation together with Spain. Back then this was mostly aimed towards sensors with each country developing their own hull. This resulted in the common use of the SMART-L and APAR radars. And more recently the Dutch Damen Group is working together with a German consortium (including Lürssen and Blohm+Voss) on the F126 frigate.

In November 2021 it was announced that Germany chose to use radar from Hensoldt. This was following Germany's decision to label the construction of surface ships among key technologies. However, this decision strains the cooperation between Germany and The Netherland because part of the agreement was to develop radar and weaponsystems together. Also the fact that the two countries have different requirements for the size of internal spaces like stairs causes a difficulty in the cooperation.

During a defence meeting on November 7, 2022, with the Tweede kamer questions were raised by MP Peter Valstar on the future of the cooperation, pointing towards the German navy leaning into the idea of acquiring a similar ship like the American Constellation class, which in first instance was not designed as an air defence frigate. New Secretary for Defence, Christophe van der Maat, said that there are still multiple scenarios possible with or without German participation. To avoid a permanent break in the partnership a project organization was formed to set up a directory of requirements and building rules both countries can accept.

=== Potential partners ===
Christophe van der Maat said in the same November 7 defence meeting that another possibility to move forward with the FuAD program is to look for additional partners. Most likely he referred to Scandinavian countries with similar needs. And in particular Denmark with the Iver Huitfeldt class. This class has a comparable role and sensor suite to De Zeven Provinciën. Commander of the Royal Netherlands Navy René Tas repeated this ambition the next day at the opening of a conference at the TU Delft. Tas elaborated by saying multiple letters of intent were signed with Denmark, Finland, Germany, Norway and Sweden to, in terms of naval ship building, collaborate on future weapon systems. The Dutch navy will now investigate if one or more of these countries is interested to participate.

== See also ==
- Future of the Royal Netherlands Navy
