= HNLMS Hydra =

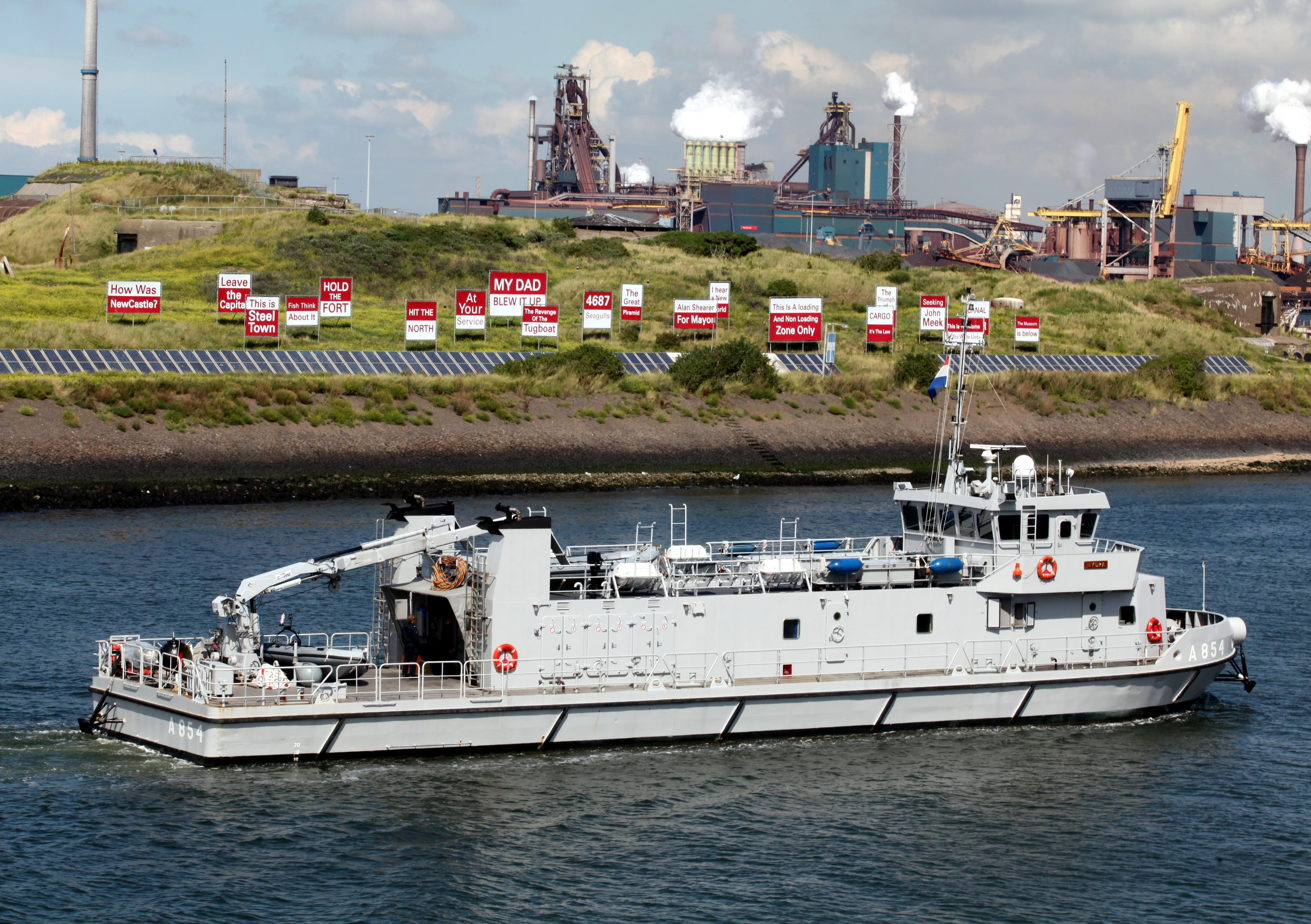

History

Netherlands
- Name: HNLMS Hydra
- Operator: Royal Netherlands Navy
- Builder: Scheepswerf Visser, Den Helder
- Laid down: 11 June 1992
- Launched: 11 September 1992
- Commissioned: 20 November 1992
- Identification: IMO number: 9034171; MMSI number: 245990000; Callsign: PD2231; Hull number: A854
- Status: In active service
- Badge

General characteristics
- Type: Cerberus-class diving support vessel
- Displacement: 340 t (335 long tons) full load
- Length: 37.8 m (124 ft 0 in)
- Beam: 8.76 m (28 ft 9 in)
- Height: 13.2 m (43 ft 4 in)
- Draft: 1.50 m (4 ft 11 in)
- Propulsion: 2× Volvo Penta TADM 122A
- Speed: 10.5 knots (19.4 km/h; 12.1 mph)
- Crew: 6

HNLMS Hydra (A854) is a diving support vessel of the Royal Netherlands Navy.

== History ==
Hydra was laid down on 11 June 1992 at Scheepswerf Visser in Den Helder (now part of the Damen Group) as the last of four new diving support vessel. She was launched later that year on 11 September 1992 and commissioned on 20 November 1992.

During a refit in 1997, Hydra received a 10.5-metre (34 ft) extension in the mid-section and a new bow thruster among other things. The lengthening increased the displacement from 223 t (219 long tons) to 340 t (335 long tons).

It is expected that Hydra will reach the end of her lifecycle in 2026/27.
