= HNLMS Cerberus (A851) =

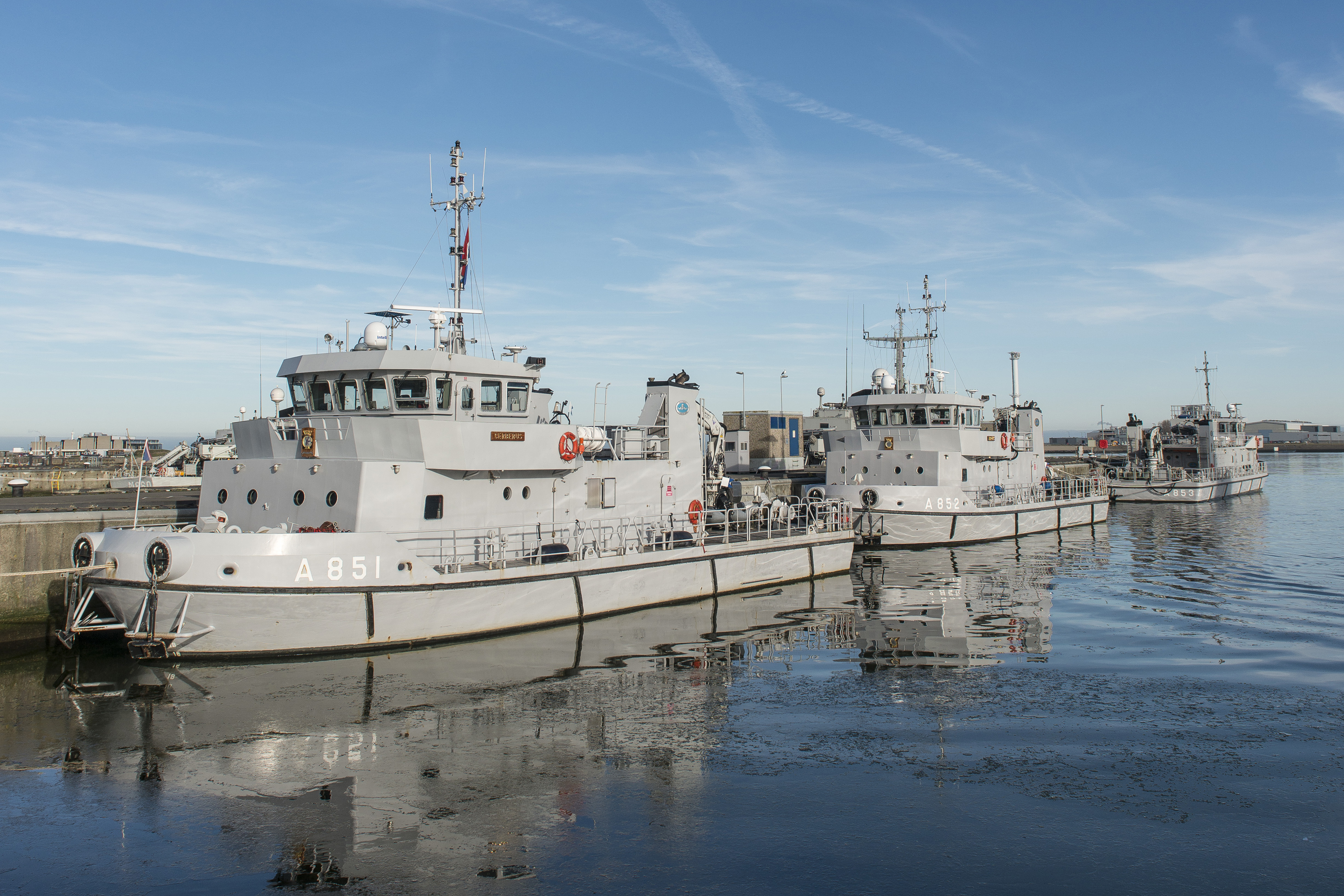

History

Netherlands
- Name: HNLMS Cerberus
- Namesake: Cerberus
- Operator: Royal Netherlands Navy
- Builder: Scheepswerf Visser, Den Helder
- Laid down: 15 April 1991
- Launched: 18 December 1991
- Commissioned: 28 February 1992
- Identification: IMO number: 9021734; MMSI number: 245850000; Callsign: PD2193; Hull number: A851
- Status: In active service
- Badge

General characteristics
- Type: Cerberus-class diving support vessel
- Displacement: 223 t (219 long tons) full load
- Length: 27.94 m (91 ft 8 in)
- Beam: 8.76 m (28 ft 9 in)
- Height: 13.2 m (43 ft 4 in)
- Draft: 1.50 m (4 ft 11 in)
- Propulsion: 2× Volvo Penta TADM 122A
- Speed: 10.5 knots (19.4 km/h; 12.1 mph)
- Crew: 6

HNLMS Cerberus (A851) is a diving support vessel of the Royal Netherlands Navy. She has been named after the mythical creature Cerberus.

== History ==
Cerberus was laid down on 15 April 1991 at Scheepswerf Visser in Den Helder (now part of the Damen Group) as the first of four new diving support vessel. She was launched later that year on 18 December 1991 and commissioned on 28 February 1992.

On 13 November 2024 Cerberus helped remove a US World War II 2000-pound bomb from a dredger during an explosives disposal operation of the Dutch Defence Explosive Ordnance Disposal Service (DEODS).

It is expected that Cerberus will reach the end of her lifecycle in 2026/27.
