= HNLMS Argus =

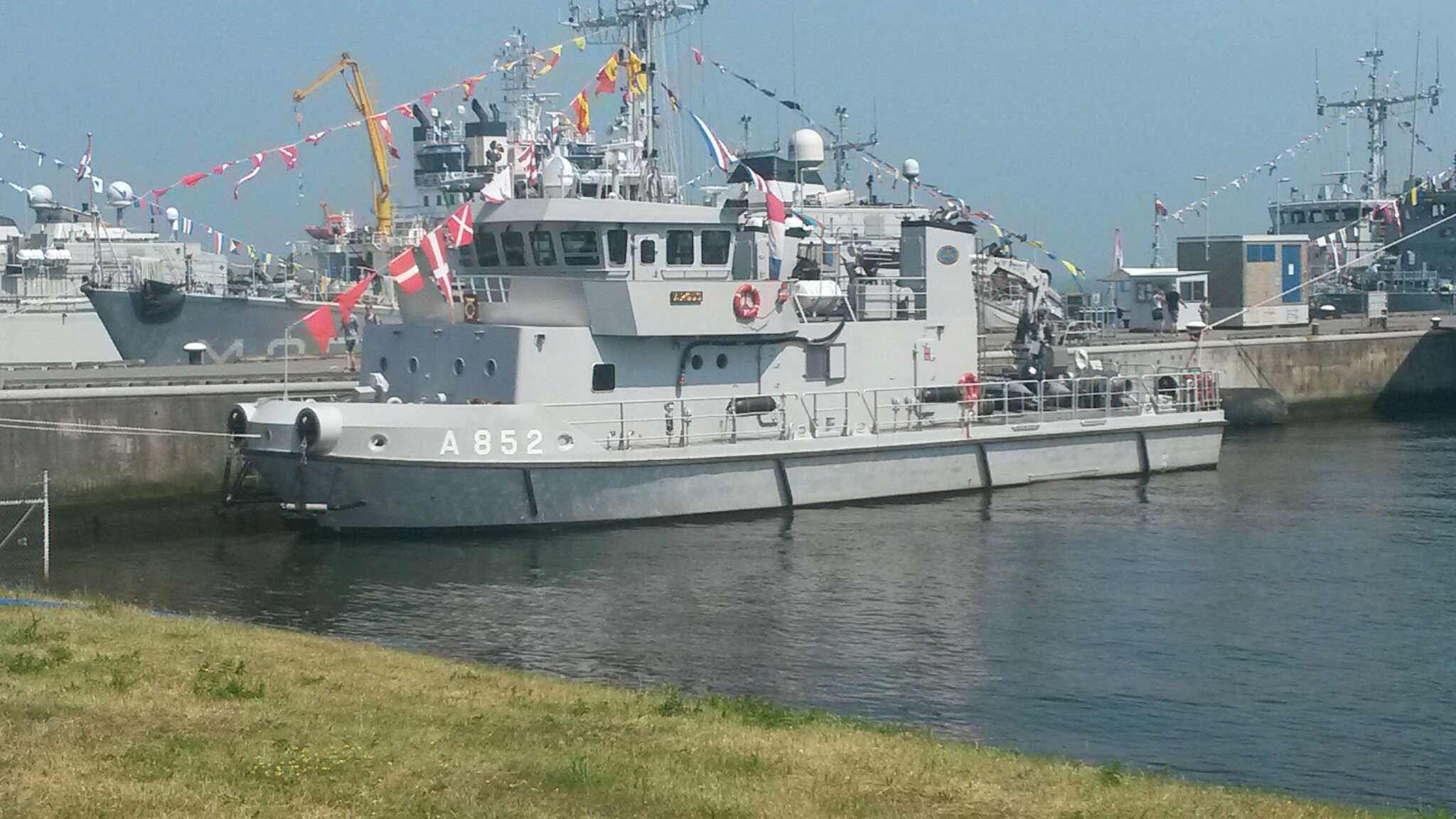

History

Netherlands
- Name: HNLMS Argus
- Operator: Royal Netherlands Navy
- Builder: Scheepswerf Visser, Den Helder
- Laid down: 16 September 1991
- Launched: 14 March 1992
- Commissioned: 2 June 1992
- Identification: IMO number: 9021746; MMSI number: 245988000; Callsign: PD2186; Hull number: A852
- Status: In active service
- Badge

General characteristics
- Type: Cerberus-class diving support vessel
- Displacement: 223 t (219 long tons) full load
- Length: 27.94 m (91 ft 8 in)
- Beam: 8.76 m (28 ft 9 in)
- Height: 13.2 m (43 ft 4 in)
- Draft: 1.50 m (4 ft 11 in)
- Propulsion: 2× Volvo Penta TADM 122A
- Speed: 10.5 knots (19.4 km/h; 12.1 mph)
- Crew: 6

HNLMS Argus (A852) is a diving support vessel of the Royal Netherlands Navy.

== History ==
Argus was laid down on 16 September 1991 at Scheepswerf Visser in Den Helder (now part of the Damen Group) as the second of four new diving support vessel. She was launched the next year on 14 March 1992 and commissioned on 2 June 1992.

In February 2026 Argus was moored at the shipyard of Damen in Den Helder. On images can be seen that the hull of the vessel was damaged at the time.

It is expected that Argus will reach the end of her lifecycle in 2026/27.
