= HNLMS Nautilus (A853) =

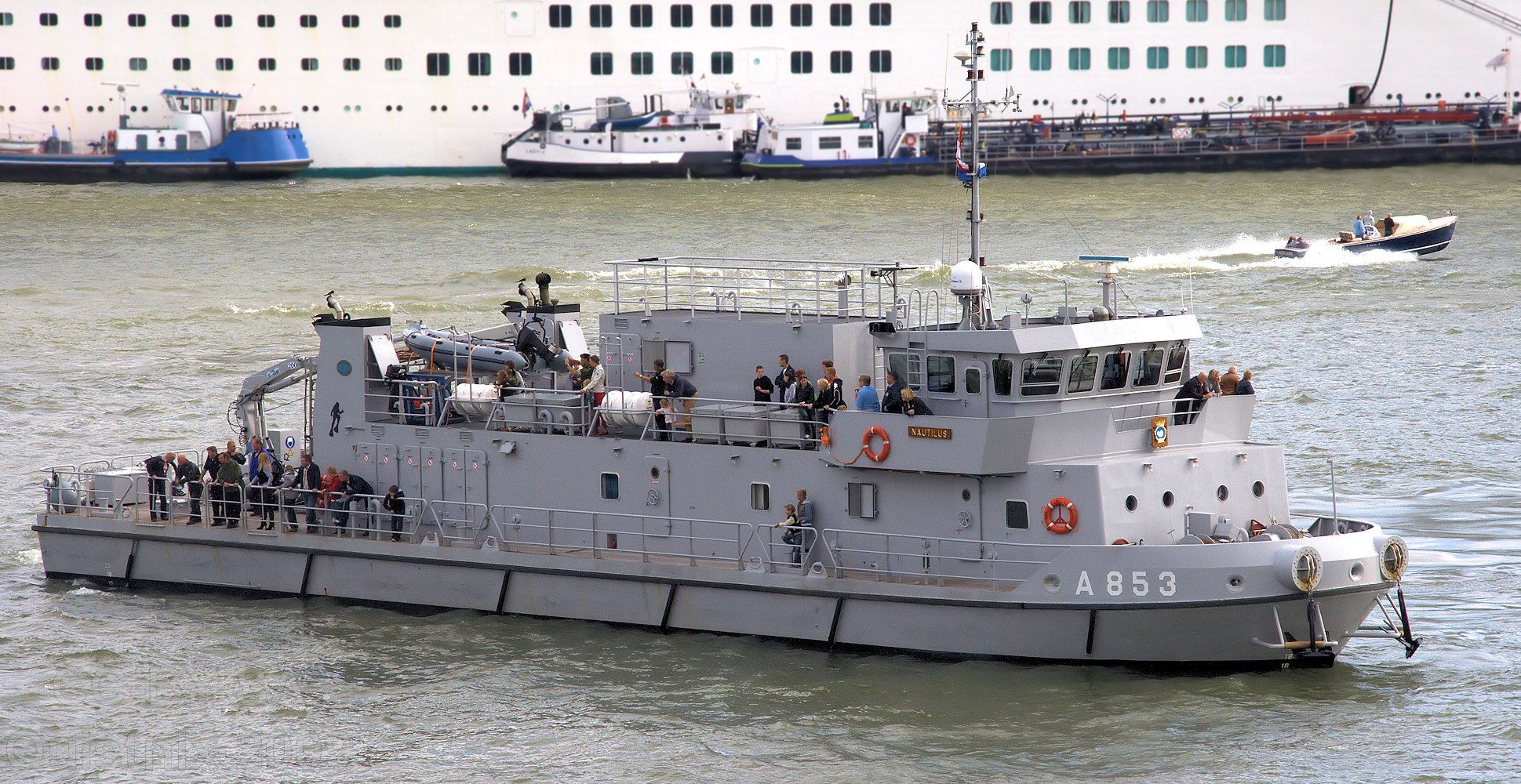

History

Netherlands
- Name: HNLMS Nautilus
- Operator: Royal Netherlands Navy
- Builder: Scheepswerf Visser, Den Helder
- Laid down: 16 March 1992
- Launched: 10 June 1992
- Commissioned: 18 September 1992
- Identification: IMO number: 9021758; MMSI number: 245989000; Callsign: PD2263; Hull number: A853
- Status: In active service
- Badge

General characteristics
- Type: Cerberus-class diving support vessel
- Displacement: 340 t (335 long tons) full load
- Length: 37.8 m (124 ft 0 in)
- Beam: 8.76 m (28 ft 9 in)
- Height: 13.2 m (43 ft 4 in)
- Draft: 1.50 m (4 ft 11 in)
- Propulsion: 2× Volvo Penta TADM 122A
- Speed: 10.5 knots (19.4 km/h; 12.1 mph)
- Crew: 6

HNLMS Nautilus (A853) is a diving support vessel of the Royal Netherlands Navy.

== History ==
Nautilus was laid down on 15 March 1992 at Scheepswerf Visser in Den Helder (now part of the Damen Group) as the third of four new diving support vessel. She was launched later that year on 10 June 1992 and commissioned on 18 September.

During a refit in 2008, Nautilus received a 10.5-metre (34 ft) extension in the mid-section and a new bow thruster among other things. The lengthening increased the displacement from 223 t (219 long tons) to 340 t (335 long tons).

It is expected that Nautilus will reach the end of her lifecycle in 2026/27.
