= Materiel and IT Command =

Dutch government agency

- Commando Materieel en IT
- Coat of arms

- Logo of all Dutch government agencies

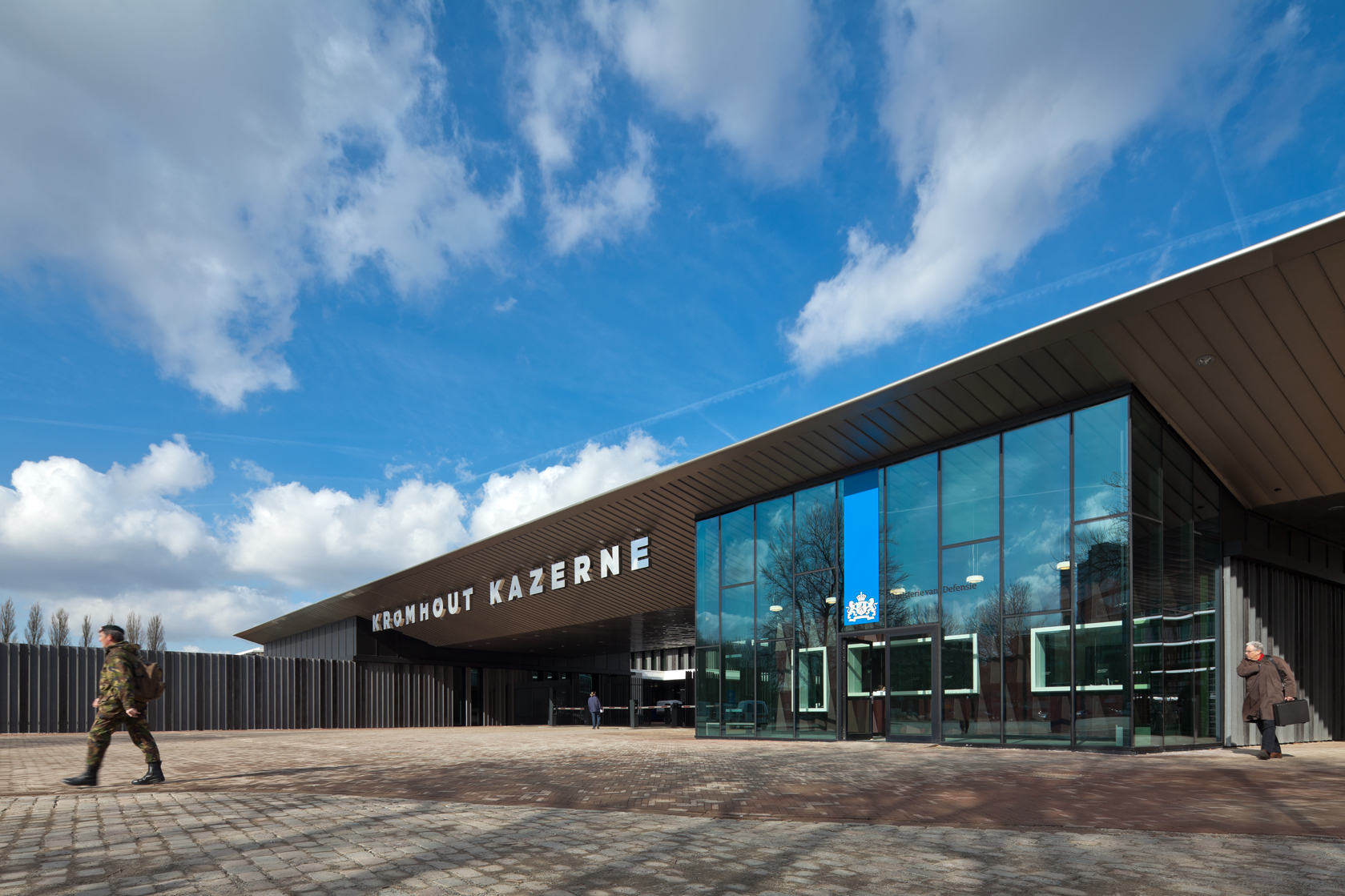
- Headquarters of COMMIT

Interservice Command overview
- Formed: 2005
- Jurisdiction: Government of the Netherlands
- Headquarters: Kromhout Kazerne, Herculeslaan 1, Utrecht
- Motto: Wij maken de verbinding tussen willen en kunnen (we make the connection between wanting and being able to) Per scientiam vires (strength through knowledge)
- Employees: 5,998 (2024)
- Annual budget: 864,084,000 EUR (2025)
- Minister responsible: Dilan Yeşilgöz, Minister of Defence
- Deputy Minister responsible: Derk Boswijk, State Secretary for Defence
- Interservice Command executive: vice-admiral Jan Willem Hartman, Commander
- Parent department: Ministry of Defence
- Website: www.defensie.nl/organisatie/commit

The Materiel and IT Command (COMMIT) (Dutch: Commando Materieel en IT, COMMIT), formerly known as the Defence Materiel Organization (DMO), is a Dutch government agency that reports to the Ministry of Defence. The agency is responsible for the supply of materiel for the Dutch armed forces. It is located in Utrecht. In April 2023 the agency changed its name from Defence Materiel Organization to Materiel and IT Command.

== Organization ==
=== Defensie Munitiebedrijf ===
Defensie Munitiebedrijf (DMunB) is part of COMMIT and counts around 100 employees. It has the largest munitions complex of Western Europe. DMunB is responsible for delivering munitions to the armed forces that can be used during operations and exercises.

=== Maritime Systems Division ===
The Maritime Systems Division (Dutch: Afdeling Maritieme Systemen; AMS) is the maritime engineering office of the Dutch Ministry of Defence. It focuses on designing, developing, integrating and procuring new systems for the Royal Netherlands Navy.

== Commanders since 2005 ==
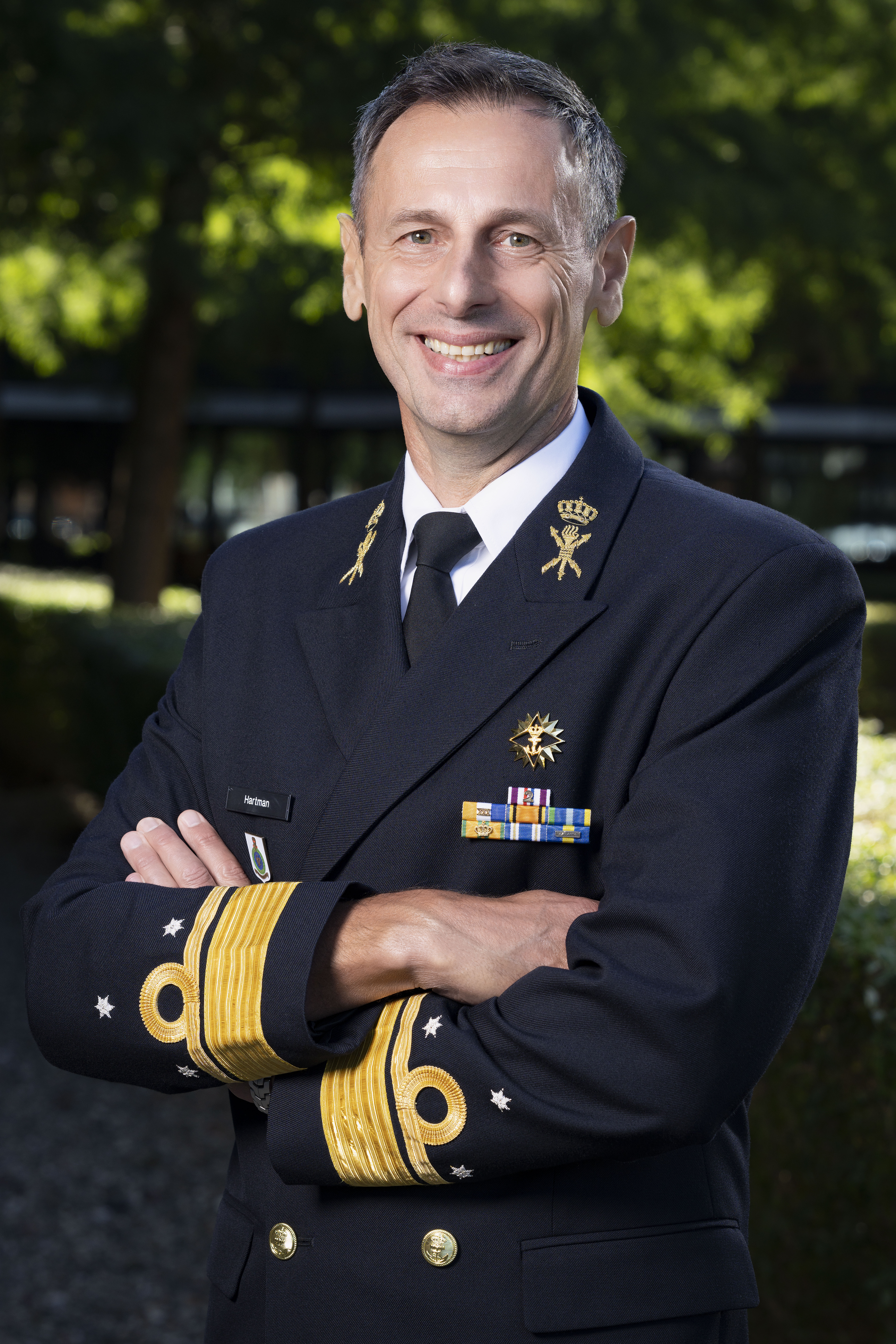
Jan Willem Hartman

Jan Willem Hartman was the first to be given the title of commander, previously, the agency head was called the director.

- 2005 - December 2006: Dirk van Dord
- December 2006 - October 2014: Lex Hendrichs
- October 2014 - December 2015: vice-admiral Matthieu Borsboom
- December 2015 – September 2023: vice-admiral Arie Jan de Waard
- September 2023 – Present: vice-admiral Jan Willem Hartman

== Procurement projects ==
COMMIT manages a variety of defense procurement projects. Examples of past, present and future projects include:

=== Army ===
- PULS rocket artillery

=== Air and Space Force ===
- Lockheed Martin F-35 Lightning II
- General Atomics MQ-9 Reaper

=== Navy ===
- Combat Support Ship
- Karel Doorman-class replacement program
- Vlissingen-class mine countermeasures vessel
- Walrus-class replacement program
- Plot Level Data Exchange and Fusion (PLDEF) system

== See also ==
- Future of the Royal Netherlands Navy
