= HNLMS Mercuur =

Submarine support ship

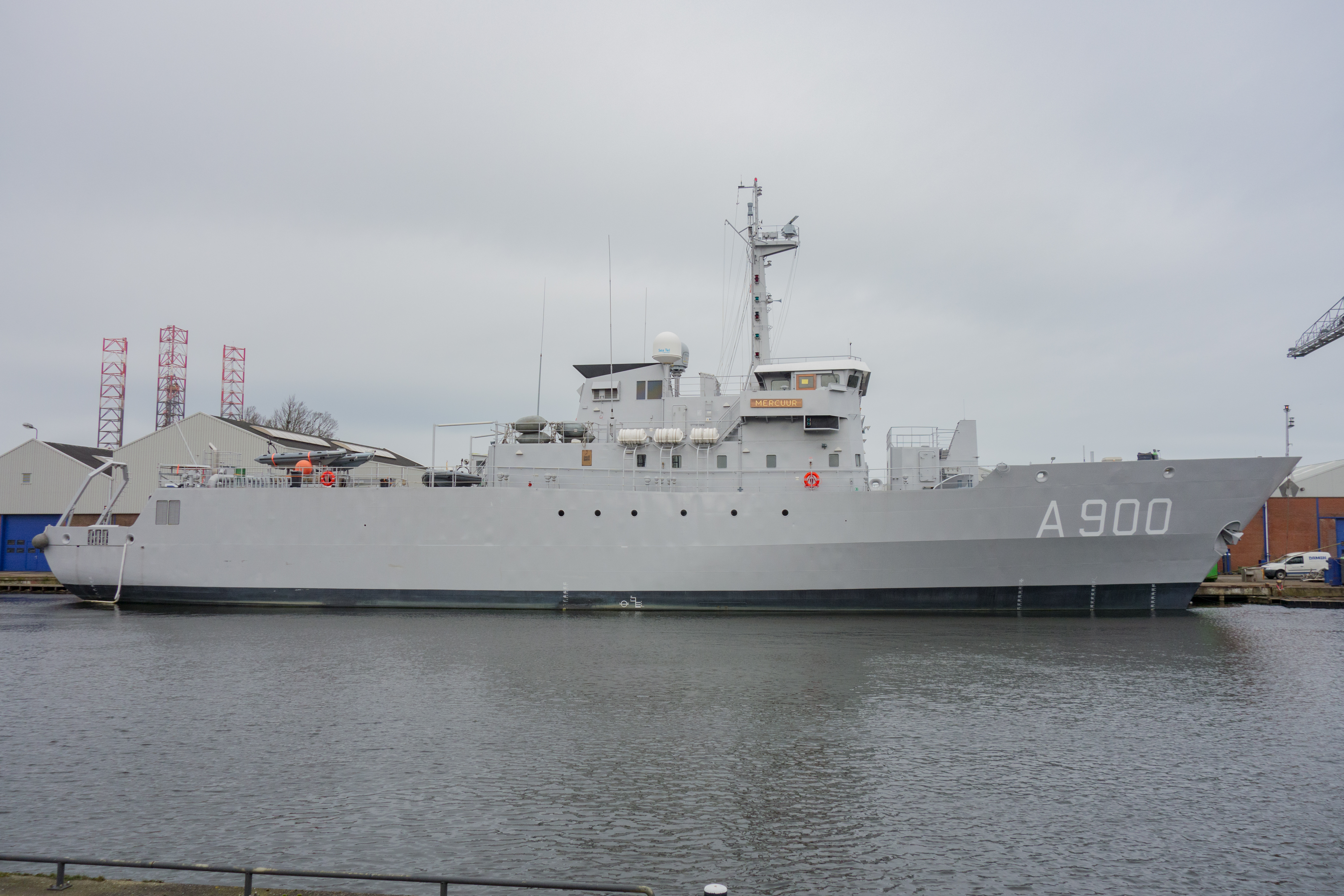
- HNLMS Mercuur

History

Netherlands
- Name: Mercuur
- Ordered: June 1984
- Builder: Koninklijke Maatschappij De Schelde
- Laid down: 16 November 1985
- Launched: 16 October 1987
- Commissioned: 21 August 1987
- Identification: MMSI number: 245974000; Callsign: PARE; Pennant number: A900
- Status: in active service
- Badge

General characteristics
- Type: Submarine support ship
- Displacement: approx. 1400 ton
- Length: 64.4 m (211 ft 3 in)
- Beam: 12 m (39 ft 4 in)
- Draught: 4.3 m (14 ft 1 in)
- Propulsion: 2 MAN 6L-20/27 diesel
- Speed: 14 knots (26 km/h; 16 mph)
- Armament: Mark 48 torpedoes; 2 x 20 mm gun

HNLMS Mercuur (A900) is a submarine support ship of the Royal Netherlands Navy. The ship was built and designed specially to support the Dutch submarines. She entered service on 21 August 1987, and is the only surface vessel attached to the Dutch submarine service.

== History ==
The former torpedo ship HNLMS Mercuur was in need of replacement at beginning of the early 1970s. She was a former minesweeper of the Aggressive class and re-purposed in 1972 as a submarine support ship. The ship, however, was due her age not adequately equipped to fulfill the tasks the Royal Netherlands Navy (RNN) wanted to use her for, so in 1977 the RNN started to make plans and designs for her replacement. The new ship would also be called Mercuur and named after the planet Mercury. This name was always given to ships that were not meant for combat, but rather had a support function. The design of the new ship was especially tailored made for submarine support tasks. The new Mercuur could, for example, hoist torpedoes onto deck with a special hoisting installation which was constructed at the backside of the ship. The ship can also do launch tests for the Mark 48 torpedo, which are used by all Dutch submarines since the Zwaardvis class entered service in the 1970s. The design has also a retractable bow thruster with which Mercuur can accurately approach a submarine to retrieve her torpedoes, which have been shot during an exercise at Mercuur. Like the water-filled hydrographic research vessel of the RNN it has a sling damper system.

In 1985 the construction of the new HNLMS Mercuur began. The RNN signed a contract with Koninklijke Maatschappij de Schelde (now known as Damen Schelde Naval Shipbuilding) to build the ship. The contract was placed to make sure no yard worker would be fired, since shipbuilder De Schelde struggled at the time with orders, so it had to lay off workers if the situation did not change. The order can therefore be seen as subsidy. On 6 November 1985 the keel was laid and on 16 October 1986 Mercuur was launched. On 21 August 1987 Mercuur was put into service and has been serving ever since, with a minor break for implementing upgrades during her modernization. She has served several Dutch submarines during her service. Besides the current Walrus-class submarines that are in active duty, they have also supported the previous active Zwaardvis-class submarines and even the older Dolfijn-class submarines during their last years of service in the RNN.

== Modernization ==
In 2015 Damen Group won an order for the maintenance and modernization of the torpedo support ship Mercuur. The ship underwent modifications including; a different design of the bridge, a whole range of new electronic equipment, and a reinforced bow. Damen also announced that the interior of Mercuur would re-designed, such as the kitchen and living quarters. Mercuur arrived on 7 September 2015 at Damen Shipyards Den Helder for her modernization to start. It was towed to Damen Shiprepair Harlingen for the final phase of the refurbishment six months later. After the modernization was complete, Mercuur was expected to stay in service in the RNN until at least 2025. However, Mercuur will be replaced before 2034 alongside other navy ships.

In April 2017 the modernized Mercuur took part in a shakedown cruise to test her upgrades.

== Support role ==
Mercuur has several tasks that all involve supporting the Dutch submarines. Firstly, Mercuur will always take part in training exercises which involve the submarines of the RNN, during these exercises Mercuur functions mostly as target ship. The exercises are regularly held in the Norwegian fjords. Another task of the Mercuur is that it performs tests and experiments with torpedoes that are used by the four Dutch submarines. Besides tests and experiments it also performs maintenance on the torpedoes.

== See also ==
- List of submarines of the Netherlands
- Ships of the Royal Netherlands Navy
- Royal Netherlands Navy Submarine Service
