= Anti-Submarine Warfare Frigate (Royal Netherlands Navy) =

Project to replace existing navy frigates

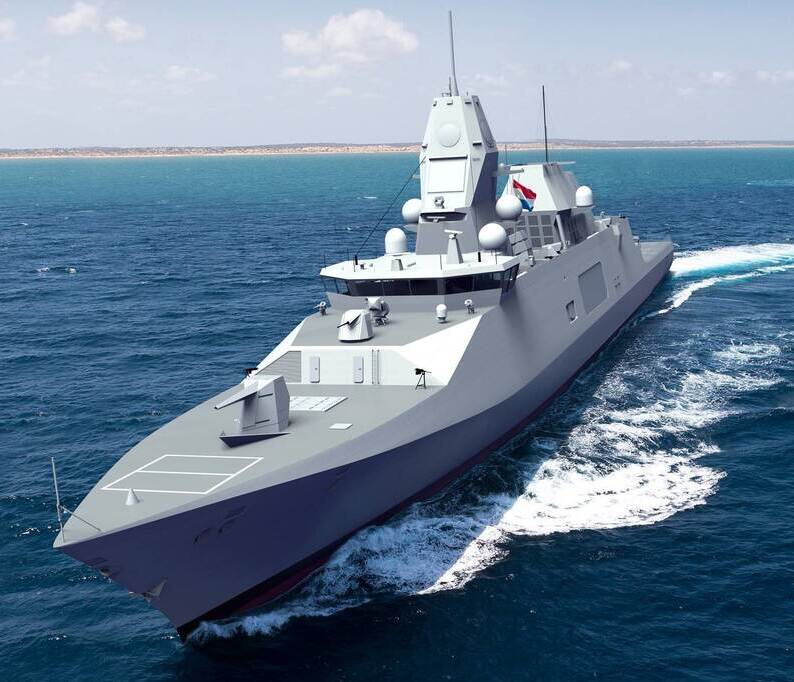
- Artist impression of the ASWF

Class overview
- Name: Anti-Submarine Warfare Frigate
- Builders: Damen Schelde Naval Shipbuilding (fitting out); Damen Shipyards Galați (hull)
- Operators: Royal Netherlands Navy; Belgian Navy
- Preceded by: Karel Doorman class
- Cost: €4 billion for 4 ships (as of April 2023)
- Built: 2020s–2030s
- Planned: Royal Netherlands Navy: 4; Belgian Navy: 3

General characteristics
- Displacement: 6,650 tons
- Length: 145 m (475 ft 9 in)
- Beam: 18 m (59 ft 1 in)
- Draught: 5.5 m (18 ft 1 in)
- Installed power: 32 MW (43,000 hp)
- Propulsion: CODLAD: 2 × MAN Energy Solutions 20V28/33D STC propulsion engines; 4 × MAN Energy Solutions 16V175D-MEV variable-speed naval GenSets; 2 × RENK gearbox system (subcontractor: Schelde Gears B.V.); ABB Onboard DC Grid™ integrated power and distribution system; Propellers: Kongsberg Maritime controllable pitch propellers
- Complement: 117 (plus space for additional 40)
- Sensors & processing systems: Systems; TNO UWWS (Under Water Warfare System); Thales AWWS (Above Water Warfare System) fire control cluster; Sonars: Ultra Maritime Low-Frequency Active Passive Sonar (LFAPS): Sea Lancer (towed body in-line sonar); Sea Sabre (towed body variable depth sonar); Bow sonar; Mine and obstacle avoidance; Dipping sonar: USV (12 meters) with Thales FLASH; Radars: Thales APAR block 2.0, X-band multifunctional radar; Thales SM400 block 2, (E-band - F band (NATO)) multifunctional radar; Thales PHAROS multi-target tracking radar; Thales Scout Mk3 low-detectability naval surveillance radar; Terma SCANTER 6002 naval surveillance radars; Electro-optical sensors: Thales Mirador Mk2 (fire control); Thales Gatekeeper Mk2 (observation); Communications: Integrated Communications System (ICS) by Rohde & Schwarz with the NAVICS solution (internal and external communication), including cyber security.; Data distribution units (Exail and RH Marine Netherlands B.V.); Navigation: Inertial Navigation System (Exail and RH Marine Netherlands B.V.)
- Electronic warfare & decoys: Systems to be installed: Soft-kill torpedo countermeasures system; Future systems planned: Hard-kill anti-torpedo torpedo system
- Armament: Torpedoes: Mark 54 Lightweight Torpedo; Atlas Elektronik SeaSpider anti-torpedo torpedo; Missiles: 2 × 4-cell NSM launchers; 2 × 8-cell Mk 41 VLS with 64 RIM-162 ESSM Block 2 (quad-packs per cell); 1 × RAM RIM-116, 21 missiles each; Guns: 1 × 76mm Sovraponte naval gun with DART Munition; 2 × Bofors 40Mk4
- Aircraft carried: 1 × NH90 helicopter; 1 × UAV

The Anti-Submarine Warfare Frigate (ASWF) is a project of the Royal Netherlands Navy (RNLN, Dutch: Koninklijke Marine) and Belgian Navy to replace the existing Multipurpose- or M-frigates.

== Context ==
The current M-frigates were originally planned to be retired around 2020. However, due to extensive budget cuts over the past decades and other large materiel programs such as the acquisition of the F-35 for the Royal Netherlands Air Force, the Dutch Ministry of Defense did, in the 2020's, not have enough funds available to start building the ships. Therefore the lifespan of the current vessels has been extended until 2025. Keeping the ships any longer will cause problems with NATO and related tasks because the ships weapons suite is outdated and not up to current standards. The M-frigates only carry 16 surface-to-air missiles in the form of the outdated NATO Sea Sparrow (RIM-7). Onboard modern ships the Evolved Sea Sparrow does the job, but do not fit in the outdated Mk48 VLS cells on board the M-frigates. Apart from these, the M-frigates only have a single Goalkeeper system for CIWS. Offensive capabilities are limited to obsolete RGM-84 Harpoon missiles. The 76mm cannon is not fit for modern semi-guided munitions like DART, Davide/STRALES, or VULCANO.

The RNLN searched for European partners to build the ships with and cut costs, and in January 2017 reached an agreement with the Belgian Navy to build a total of four ships together. The Netherlands leads the ASWF project, with Damen and Thales acting as prime contractors. The number could be adjusted later on during next phases of the acquisition process. With a total of four ships to be built, two for the RNLN, the current M-frigates are to be replaced by an equal number. There are concerns about whether that number is enough to meet current and near future challenges, since often the RNLN has no ships available to fulfill the most basic of its duties (like supporting foreign navy ships along the Dutch coast).

The costs for the four ships are currently estimated at 1.5-2.5 billion euros for the two Dutch frigates and 1 billion euros for the two Belgian frigates. It had been hoped that the first frigate would be delivered to the Royal Netherlands Navy in 2024, while the first frigate for the Belgian Navy was to be delivered in 2027. However, as of 2020, the in-service date for the two Dutch frigates had slipped to 2028–29 with the Belgian frigates following immediately thereafter. In March 2023, the Dutch Ministry of Defense announced that it expected to deploy the first frigate in 2029, with Belgium deploying their first in 2030. The other two remaining frigates would be deployed in the following years.

A final agreement for the four ships was signed on 22 June 2023 by Dutch Minister of Defence Kajsa Ollongren and her Belgian counterpart Ludivine Dedonder.

On 5 September 2024, the Dutch Ministry of Defense released the 2024 Defense Memorandum which sees the Royal Netherlands Navy receiving two additional frigates, bringing the total order to four frigates for the Dutch navy and six in total.

A third Belgian frigate has been spoken about for a long time. In June 2024 the Minister of Defence, Ludivine Dedonder, said the choice for a third ship was up to a next government. In a leaked coalition agreement of the new De Wever Government a substantial increase in defence spending was announced, among which a third frigate was specified, bringing the total order to three frigates for the Belgian navy and seven in total.

== Design ==
=== Armament ===
The ASWF frigates are equipped with a 76 mm Sovraponte as primary naval gun. This naval gun is capable of firing DART munition. Besides the Sovraponte gun, each frigate will also be equipped with two Bofors 40 Mk4 as secondary naval guns. When it comes to missiles, the frigates will be armed with a RIM-116 RAM. Furthermore, the ships will be equipped with two 4 canister NSM launchers and two 8-cell Mk 41 strike-length VLS that are capable of launching a total of 64 ESSM Block 2 missiles in a quad-pack configuration. In addition, the ASWF is armed with a torpedo system that is capable of launching the Mk 54 torpedo. The Netherlands plan to add the Atlaks Elektronik anti-torpedo torpedo SeaSpider. There is also room for future growth, such as potentially arming the frigates with anti-torpedo torpedoes and laser weapons.

=== Sensors and processing systems ===
The Anti-Submarine Warfare Frigates will be equipped with the Above Water Warfare System (AWWS). This system consists of a dual-band (X/S-band) radar suite and an integrated fire-control suite that allows frigates via advanced software to automatically decide what kind of defence needs to be deployed against incoming threats, which could range from guiding naval gunfire to missiles. The AWWS is based on the SM400 Block 2 S-band air surveillance radar and the APAR Block 2 X-band fire control radar. Furthermore, it also includes the Scout Mk3 low detectability naval surveillance radar, the Mirador Mk EO FCS and the Gatekeeper Mk2 360° EO observation sensor.

In addition, the ships will be equipped with the Terma Scanter 6002 Surveillance Radar. This radar features X-band technology and has multi-frequency capabilities and small target detection algorithms. The combat management system (CMS) of the ASWF will be developed by Maritime IT Department (Dutch: Afdeling Maritieme IT) of the Royal Netherlands Navy. The frigates will also be equipped with a NAVICS integrated communications system of Rohde & Schwarz.

=== Unmanned systems ===
In April 2024 it was reported that the Dutch Ministry of Defence together with Dutch Naval Design (DND) will develop an unmanned surface vessel (USV) that will be deployed from the ASWFs. The USV will be around 12 meters long and focus on Anti-Submarine Warfare (ASW). It is expected to have an active dipping sonar and a minimum endurance of at least 96 hours. The vessel will be carried in the mission bay of the ASWF and be launched and recovered via a cradle-type system.

Dutch Naval Design was commissioned to develop the system in July 2026, and it will be equipped with the Thales FLASH dipping sonar (usually used from ASW helicopters).

=== Propulsion ===
The Anti-Submarine Warfare Frigates will be equipped with MAN 20V28/33D STC marine engines in combination with MAN 16V175D-MEV naval generator sets. They will also have RENK gearboxes that will be part of the combined diesel-electric and diesel (CODLAD) propulsion system.

== Construction ==
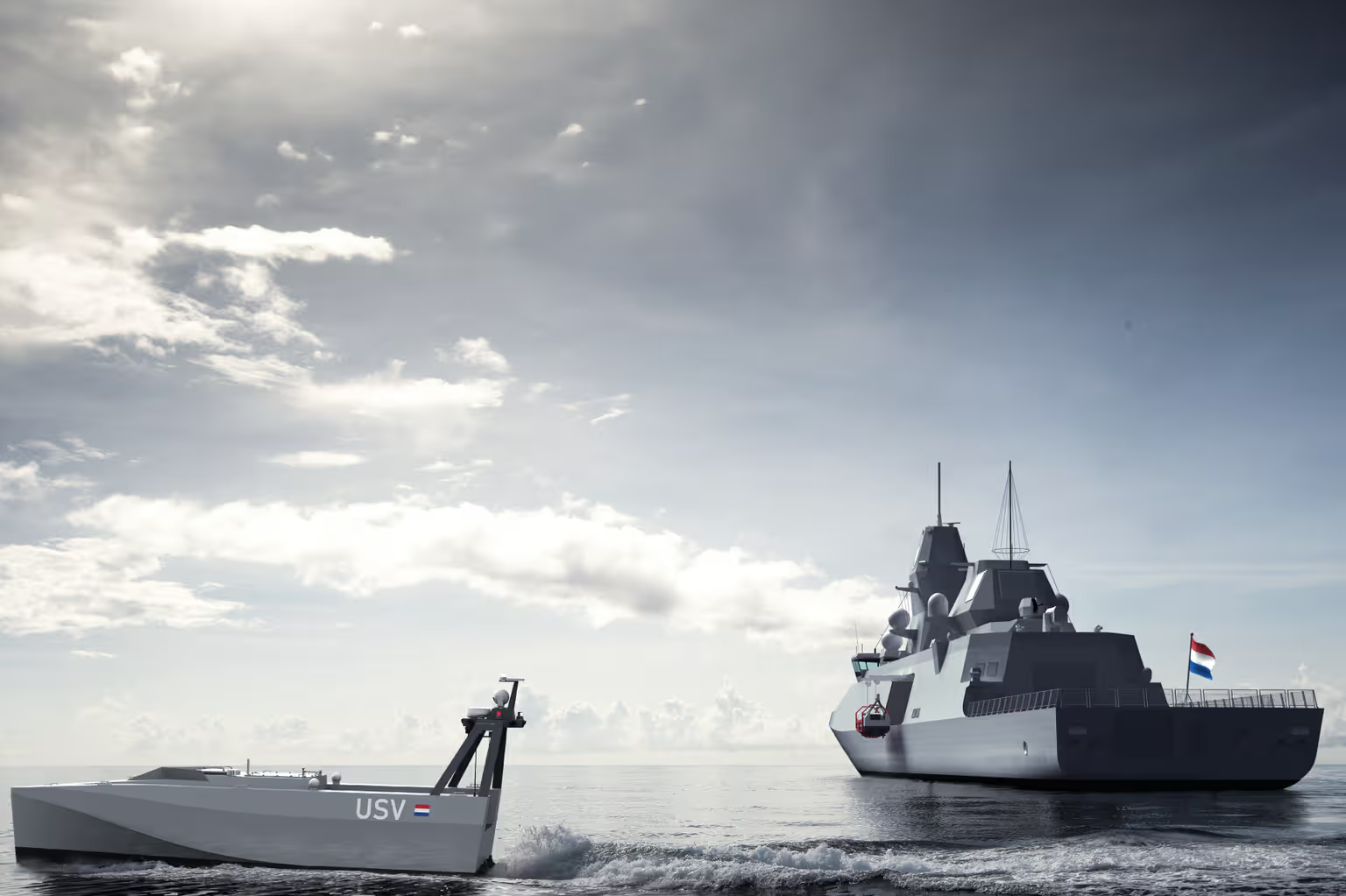
ASW frigate with its USV

The hulls will be partially manufactured in Romania, at Damen's shipyard in Galati. It will be fitted with its system at the Damen Schelde Naval Shipbuilding facility.

In November 2023 it was reported that Exail will provide advanced inertial navigation systems (INS) and data distribution units for the ASWF. Hatenboer-Water has been contracted to supply freshwater systems for the frigates, while ballast water treatment systems (BWTS) will be delivered by Optimarin.

In October 2024 Damen signed a contract with Alfa Laval for the delivery of fuel oil separators, cleaning tables, oily bilge water separators and ILS deliverables.

In June 2025 it was reported that Damen Marine Components was awarded a contract to design, engineer and produce eight rudders for the ASW Frigates. These rudders will be designed to be as silent as possible and able to withstand shock loads. That same month it was also reported that Vestdavit had signed a contract to provide advanced dual davit systems and accompanying equipment for the frigates. Furthermore, a contract was signed in June with Ultra Maritime to supply an anti-submarine warfare suite for the ships and torpedo defense capabilities. The anti-submarine warfare suite will include the Low-Frequency Active Passive Sonar (LFAPS) system.

The construction of the mast of the first ship in the class was started in June 2026, while detailed engineering officially commenced in September.

== List of ships ==
Name	No.	Builder	Contract	Status	Steel cutting	Laid down	Launched	Comm.	Notes
Royal Netherlands Navy (2 ordered + 2 planned)
TBA	TBA	Damen Schelde	Jun 2023	MoU	–	–	–	2033	Delayed programme
TBA	TBA	Damen Schelde	Jun 2023	MoU	–	–	–	–	Delayed programme
TBA	TBA	Damen Schelde	–	Planned	–	–	–	–	
TBA	TBA	Damen Schelde	–	Planned	–	–	–	–	
Belgian Navy (2 ordered + 1 planned)
TBA	TBA	Damen Schelde	Jun 2023	MoU Jun 2023	–	–	–	2034	Delayed programme.
TBA	TBA	Damen Schelde	Jun 2023	MoU Jun 2023	–	–	–	–	Delayed programme.
TBA	TBA	Damen Schelde	–	Planned	–	–	–	–	

Planned dates

== Export ==
=== Failed bids ===
Norway
The ASWF was one of the eleven competitors in the Norwegian future frigate program. This program would determine which frigate design would be used to replace the Fridtjof Nansen class. In November 2024 the ASWF was not selected when the competition was narrowed to four competitors. Norway chose the British Type 26 frigate.

== See also ==
- Future of the Royal Netherlands Navy
- De Zeven Provinciën-class frigate
