= Damen Group =

Dutch shipbuilding company

Damen Shipyards Group
- Type: Private
- Industry: Defence, Shipbuilding, Engineering
- Founded: 1927; 99 years ago in Hardinxveld-Giessendam
- Founder: Jan Damen; Marinus Damen
- Headquarters: Gorinchem, Netherlands
- Area served: worldwide
- Key people: Kommer Damen (Chairman and President); Arnout Damen (CEO)
- Products: Warships, Yachts, Fishing Vessels, Barges, Merchant vessels, Pontoons, Platform supply vessels, Floating Drydocks, Dredgers, Offshore engineering
- Revenue: € 2.5 billion (2022)
- Number of employees: 12,500 (2022)
- Website: www.damen.com

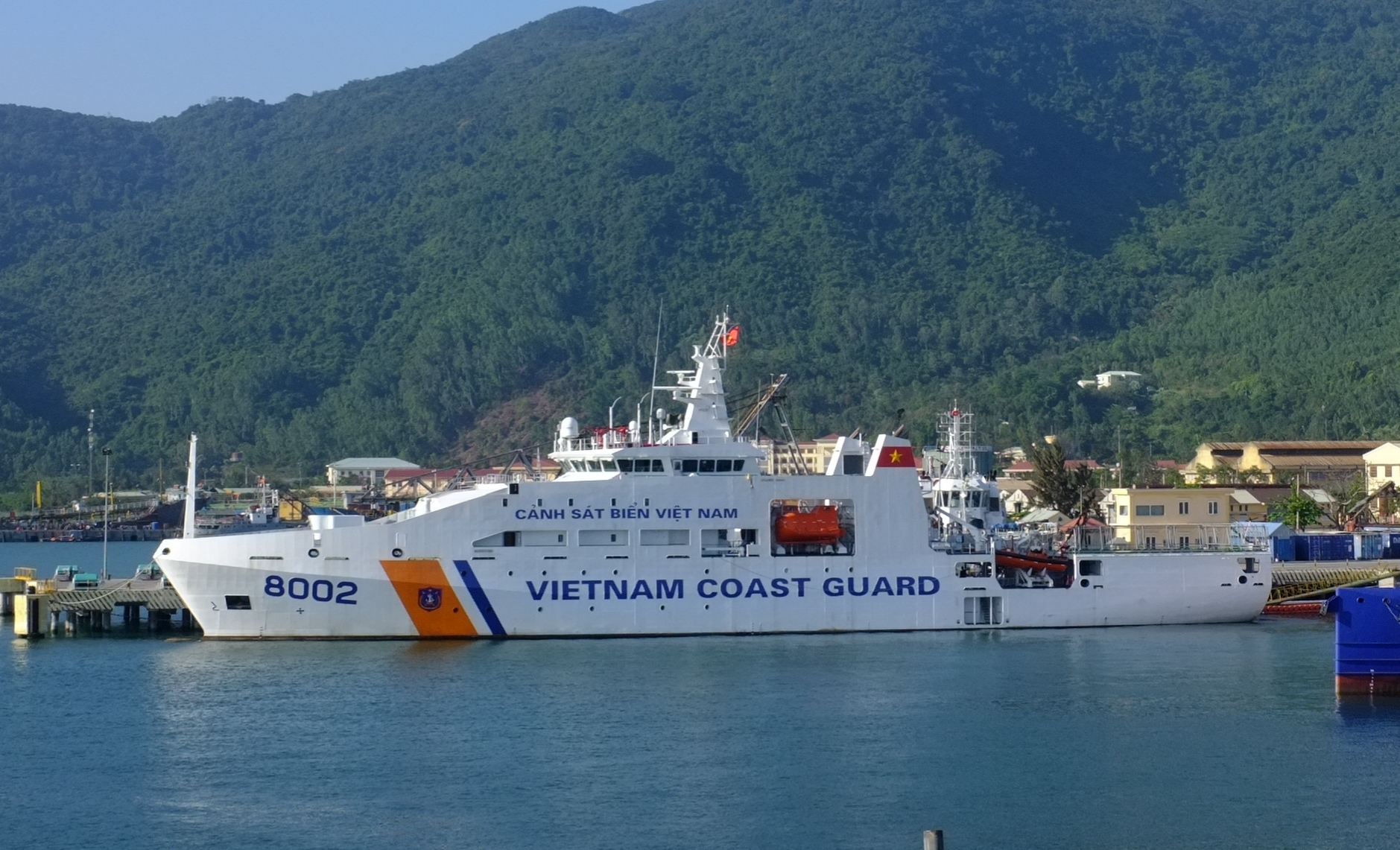
A Damen-designed offshore patrol vessel built for Vietnam Coast Guard

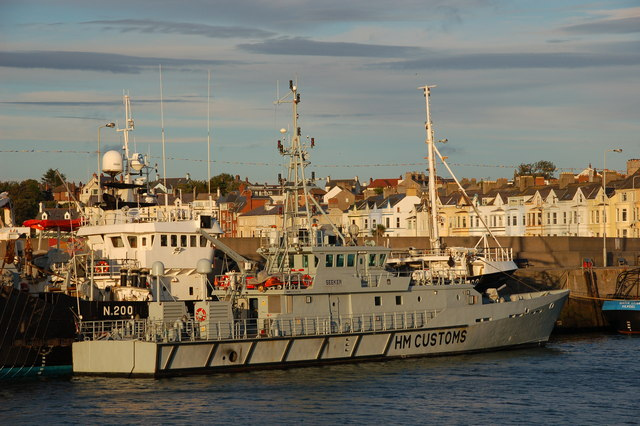
HMCC Seeker customs patrol vessel was delivered to the UK government in 2001. This 42-metre vessel has a top speed of 26 knots

The Damen Group is a Dutch defence, shipbuilding, and engineering conglomerate company based in Gorinchem, Netherlands. Though it is a major international group doing business in 120 countries, it remains a private family-owned company.

Damen Shipyards Group is a globally operating company with more than 50 shipyards, repair yards, and related companies − as well as numerous partner yards that can build Damen vessels locally. Since 1969 it has designed and built more than 5,000 vessels and delivers over 150 vessels annually. With over 30 shipyards and related companies worldwide, Damen is involved in ship construction as well as maintenance and repair activities. It has a wide product range, including warships, patrol craft, tugs, workboats, cargo vessels, dredgers, superyachts and fast ferries. Product design and engineering are carried out in-house and a broad range of designs are available.

== History ==
=== Overview ===
Damen was established in 1927 in the town of Hardinxveld-Giessendam in the Netherlands by Jan and Marinus Damen. The two brothers ran a successful, mainly Dutch-oriented, shipyard for decades. Over the years they managed to build up a small, but loyal customer-base. Damen Shipyards Hardinxveld, located about 10 km from the Damen Group headquarters in Gorinchem, still exists today. It is specialised in designing and building workboats, especially 'multi cats' and shoalbusters. In 1969 Jan Damen's son, Kommer Damen, took over.

In July 2023, Damen Marine Components was awarded a contract by Wärtsilä to provide steering equipment for two landing platform docks (LPD) that will be built at ASMAR for the Chilean Navy.7

In 2024, Damen Group lost the competition for the multibillion-euro contract to replace the Royal Netherlands Navy Walrus-class submarines. In June 2026, the German Navy cancelled the Niedersachsen-class frigate project, arguing that the main contractor (which was Damen Group) was unable to meet the time and budget constraints. In July 2026, another Damen Group contract for warships is in jeopardy, as Belgium publicly complains about Damen Group's inability to respect the agreed timeline and costs for the Anti-Submarine Warfare Frigate project.

=== World Bank debarment ===
On March 16, 2016, the World Bank Group announced its debarment of Damen Shipyards Gorinchem for 18 months. World Bank stated that the "company engaged in a fraudulent practice under the West Africa Regional Fisheries Program" The sanction followed an agreement between the World Bank and Damen Shipyards Gorinchem, hence a reduced debarment of 18 months, as stated : "Damen has cooperated with the World Bank’s investigation and has taken remedial action, including strengthening its corporate compliance program."

== Statistics ==
Key figures and statistics for Damen Shipyards Group in/as of 2015 include:

Annual turnover: 2.1 billion Euros

Damen Shipyard Group: 32 shipyards worldwide

- The Netherlands: 14
- Abroad: 18

Employees: 9,000 worldwide

- The Netherlands: 3,000
- International: 6,000

Annual deliveries 2015: 180 vessels

- Tugs and workboats: 82
- Offshore vessels: 8
- High speed craft and ferries: 62
- Pontoons and barges: 10
- Dredging and special craft: 15
- Naval and yachts: 5
- Stock hulls: >200

Total number of deliveries since 1969:

- 6,000 ships

Key figures: Damen Ship Repair and Conversion, 2015

Annual turnover (2015) : 500 million EUR

Damen Ship Repair and Conversion: 15 yards in 6 countries

- 40 dry docks
- Largest dock is 420 x 80 m

Employees: 1,500

- Delivered projects (2015): >1,500 repair, maintenance, refit and conversion projects

=== Divisions ===
- Damen Shipyards Gorinchem — in Gorinchem, an independent member of the Damen Shipyards Group.
- Royal Schelde; Warship division.
- Amels Division; Superyacht division, based in Vlissingen and part of Damen Group since 1991.

== Products ==
=== Warships ===
==== Currently produced ====
- Frigates:
  - Sigma class
  - Anti-Submarine Warfare Frigate class
- Corvettes:
  - Sigma class
- Patrol vessel
  - Crossovers
  - Stan patrol vessel (Patrol, emergency response, search and rescue)
  - Military:
    - OPV 1800, OPV 2200, OPV 2600
  - Coast guard:
    - OPV 1400, OPV 1800, OPV 2400, OPV 9014
  - FCS 4008 (XV Patrick Blackett), Romanian Border Police
  - Interceptors:
    - Interceptor 3007, Interceptor 1503 FRP, Interceptor 1102 FRP
  - Military RHIB
- Amphibious:
  - Landing Platform Docks Enforcer
  - Landing vessels:
    - Landing ships (Stan Lander 5612, LSL 80, LSL 90, LST 100, LST 120, LST 120H)
    - ESB1604 /
  - Assault crafts:
    - FAC 1604
- Support vessels
  - Den Helder class
  - LSS 9000
  - LSS 11000
- Sail training vessels
  - 3500 class
  - 3000 class
  - 2630 class (Shabab Oman II)

==== Produced in the past ====
- Frigates:
  - Kortenaer class
  - Karel Doorman class
  - De Zeven Provinciën class
- Patrol boats:
  - Holland class
  - Warrior class inshore patrol vessel
- Amphibious transport docks:
  - Rotterdam class
- Support ships
  - Karel Doorman class (joint support)
  - Pelikaan (logistic support)
  - Mercuur (submarine support)
- Training vessels
  - Van Kinsbergen
  - Cisne Branco (2200 class sail training vessel)
- Research vessels:
  - Snellius class
  - Hydrograaf
- Tugboats:
  - Noordzee class

==== In development ====
- drone-carrying Multi-Purpose Support Ship (MPSS)
  - NRP D. João II MPSS 7000 (multi-purpose support vessel)
- Replenishment oiler:
  - Den Helder class
- Frigates:
  - Anti Submarine Warfare Frigate

=== Freighters ===
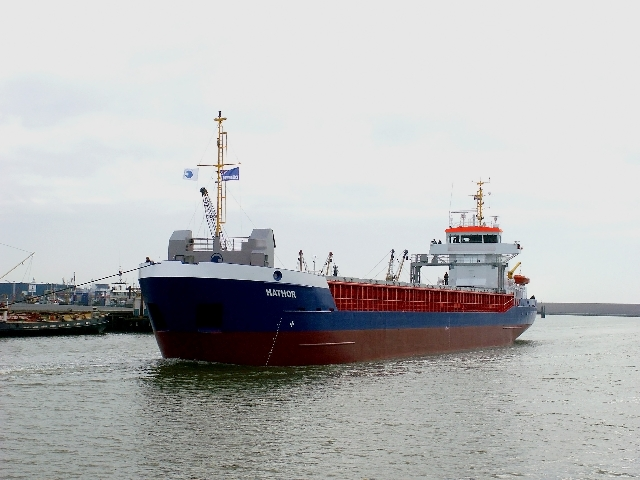
Damen Combi Freighter 3850 MS Hathor

- Container ships (Damen Container Feeder)
- Tankers (Damen Tanker)
- Heavy-lift ship (Damen HLV)
- Cargo ship (Damen Combi Freighter and Combi Coaster)

=== Passenger ships ===
- Catamarans — MV Chinook (Vancouver SeaBus in 2017)
- Ropax ferries — MV Veteran & MV Legionnaire (2015–2016)

=== Superyachts ===
- Lady Mona K (1986)
- Monte Carlo (1988)
- Here Comes The Sun (2016)

=== Mining ===
- Benguela Gem (2022)

== Customers ==
=== US Coast Guard ===
The US Coast Guard Sentinel-class Fast Response Cutter, 153 feet (47 m) long and capable of speeds of over 28 knots (52 km/h; 32 mph) is based on the Damen Stan Patrol 4708 design, and is being built by the Bollinger Shipyards of Lockport, Louisiana. The firm fixed-price contract for the first ship is worth €88m (US$120m); the approximate maximum value of the contract, if all options are exercised for a total of 34 patrol boats, is €1.5 billion ($2 billion) over a period of between six and eight years.

=== Canadian Coast Guard ===
On September 2, 2009, the Ministry of Public Works and Government Services of Canada announced that nine mid-shore patrol ships based on a 'Canadianized' version of the Damen Stan Patrol 4207 would be built by Irving Shipbuilding in Halifax, Nova Scotia for use by the Canadian Coast Guard in conjunction with the Royal Canadian Mounted Police. The Canadian Department of Fisheries and Oceans had originally wanted twelve patrol craft.

=== De Beers Marine Namibia ===
In 2019, Damen Shipyards was hired by De Beers Marine Namibia to build a 177 meter diamond mining vessel, which would be the largest of its kind, for $468 million. The vessel was completed in 2022 and named Benguela Gem. It is used for subsea diamond extraction from depths of between 90 and 150 meters off the coast of Namibia. The diamonds are then processed using the vessel's onboard equipment.

=== Dutch Caribbean Coast Guard ===
Dutch Caribbean Coast Guard operates three Damen Stan Patrol 4100 vessels.

=== Jamaica Defence Force (JDF) Coast Guard ===
On October 27, 2005, the JDF Coast Guard commissioned HMJS Cornwall, the first of three Damen 4207 vessels (termed County class by the JDFCG). The second County-class vessel, HMJS Middlesex, was commissioned on April 7, 2006. The third and final vessel, HMJS Surrey, was commissioned on June 26, 2007. The vessels are dubbed County class as they are named after the three counties of Jamaica.

On June 25, 2020, the JDF Coast Guard commissioned HMJS Nanny of the Maroons, a Damen FCS 5009 Cutter. The vessel is named after the Jamaican National Hero Nanny of the Maroons.

=== Hong Kong Marine Police ===
The Marine Region of the Hong Kong Police Force is having Stan 2600 patrol boats built by Damen.

Damen Mk I boats were used in Hong Kong and now retired after Keka-class patrol boats were delivered.

=== Ecuadorian Coast Guard ===
In November 2011 the Ecuadorian Coast Guard ordered Damen Stan 2606 patrol vessels, to be built in Ecuador by Astinave.

=== Vietnam Coast Guard / Vietnam Maritime search and Rescue Coordination Center ===
Damen Group has already delivered some Damen Stan 4207 patrol vessels for search and rescue missions managed by the Vietnam Maritime search and Rescue Coordination Center (VN MRCC) under the Vietnam National Maritime Bureau and reporting to the Ministry of Transport.

The Vietnam Coast Guard also cooperated with Damen Group to build large vessels with Dutch license, such as one offshore patrol vessel 9014, one hydrographic survey vessel 6613, four salvage tugs 6412. These vessels will be built in Vietnam by the Song Thu company.

=== Trinidad and Tobago Coast Guard ===
Damen Group has already delivered 3 of 12 vessels purchased by the Trinidad and Tobago Coast Guard. A coastal patrol vessel (CPV) CG 25, interceptor (vessel) and supply vessels were delivered in July to strengthen border security and stop the illegal flow of guns, ammunition and drugs into the country.

== Group companies ==
Damen is a large group. Some of the group companies are:

- Amels
- Albwardy Damen Sharjah
- Damen Dredging Equipment
- Damen Marine Services
- Damen Schelde Marine Services
- Damen Schelde Naval Shipbuilding
- Damen Shiprepair Amsterdam
- Damen Shiprepair Brest
- Damen Shiprepair Curaçao
- Damen Shiprepair Dunkerque
- Damen Shiprepair Harlingen
- Damen Shiprepair Rotterdam
- Damen Shiprepair Vlissingen
- Damen Shipyards Bergum
- Damen Shipyards Cape Town
- Damen Shipyards Den Helder
- Damen Shipyards Galați
- Damen Shipyards Gorinchem
- Damen Shipyards Hardinxveld
- Damen Shipyards Koźle
- Damen Shipyards Mangalia
- Damen Shipyards Singapore
- Damen Trading
- Damen Maaskant Shipyards Stellen
- Damen Shipyards Antalya
- Damen Shipyards Turkey
- Damen Shiprepair Oranjewerf
- Damen Verolme Rotterdam
- Nakilat Damen Shipyards Qatar
- Damen Engineering Gdansk

== See also ==
- Shipbuilding
- Eendracht (1989 ship)
- List of yachts built by Amels BV
