= Den Osse =

Human settlement in the Netherlands

- Hamlet
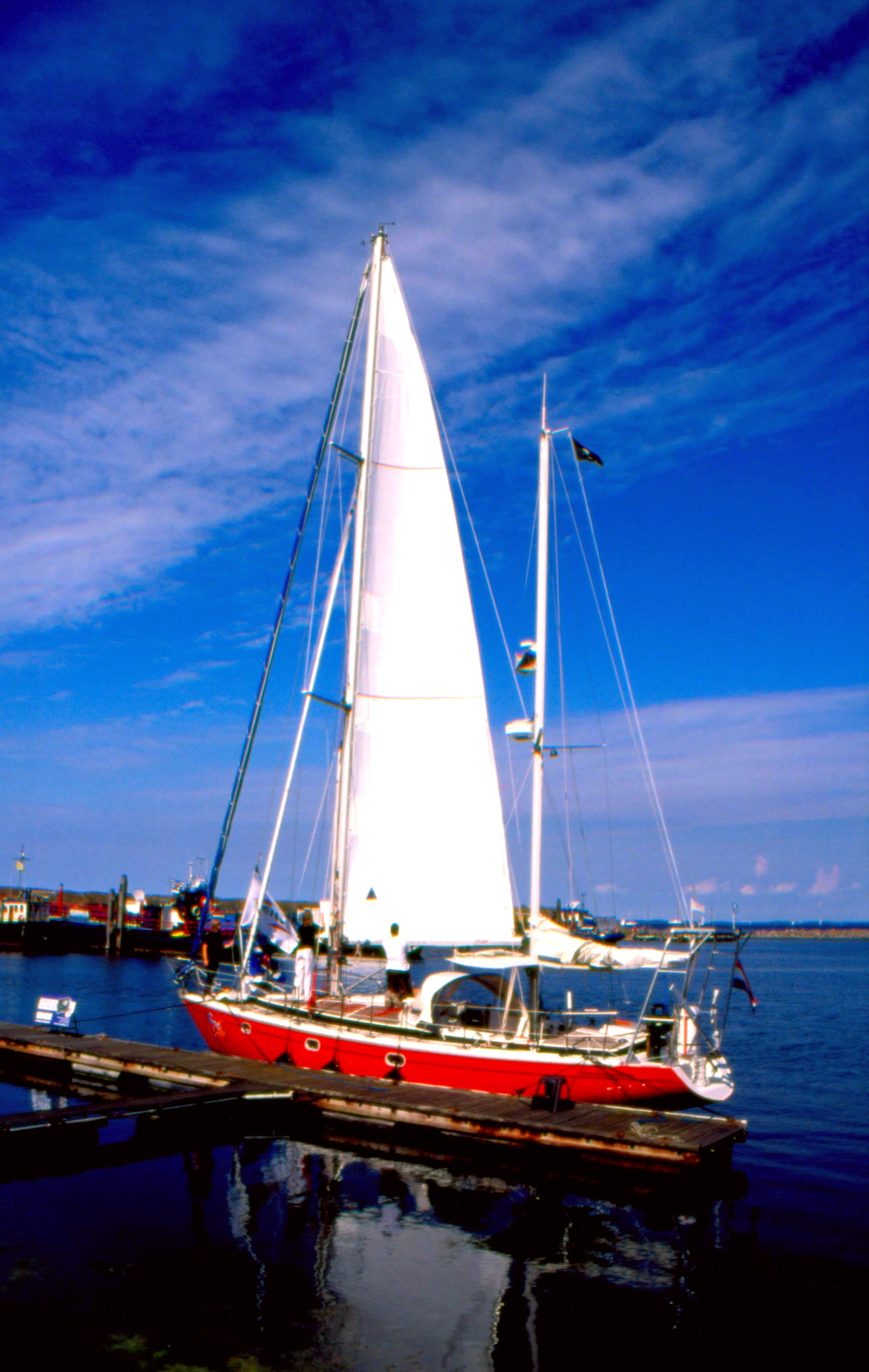
- Yacht of Laura Dekker in the harbour of Den Osse

- Location in the province of Zeeland in the Netherlands Den Osse (Netherlands)
- Coordinates: 51.7403°N 3.8846°E
- Country: Netherlands
- Province: Zeeland
- Municipality: Schouwen-Duiveland
- Time zone: UTC+1 (CET)
  - Summer (DST): UTC+2 (CEST)
- Postal code: 4323
- Dialing code: 0111

Den Osse is a hamlet in the municipality of Schouwen-Duiveland, in Zeeland, Netherlands. It is located on the Grevelingen between Scharendijke and Brouwershaven and is the northernmost place of Zeeland.

Den Osse is not a statistical entity but it has its own place name signs. The postal authorities have placed it under Brouwershaven. There are only about 15 houses for permanent residence. Den Osse had become a holiday resort and marina. It has multiple holiday parks including a former Landal Greenpark.

Den Osse is a popular diving location known for having dahlia anemones.

The hamlet has its own harbour including a jetty for Dutch Navy vessels, used for diving trainings.

== History ==
Den Osse was first visible on a map of 1636 as "Osse Steert", after the name of an inn.

The place belonged to Klaaskinderkerke in the past. When that municipality was abolished in 1813, it became, also like Brijdorpe and Looperskapelle, part of Duivendijke.

Den Osse was flooded during the North Sea flood of 1953. Due to the flood the village shrank because destroyed houses were demolished and not rebuilt. At the parking lot of the diving site on the Nieuwe Kerkweg is a sign commemorating the shrinkage.

After Duivendijke was abolished in 1961, Den Osse became part of Brouwershaven. Since 1997, it has been part of the municipality of Schouwen-Duiveland, just like the rest of the island.

== Monuments ==
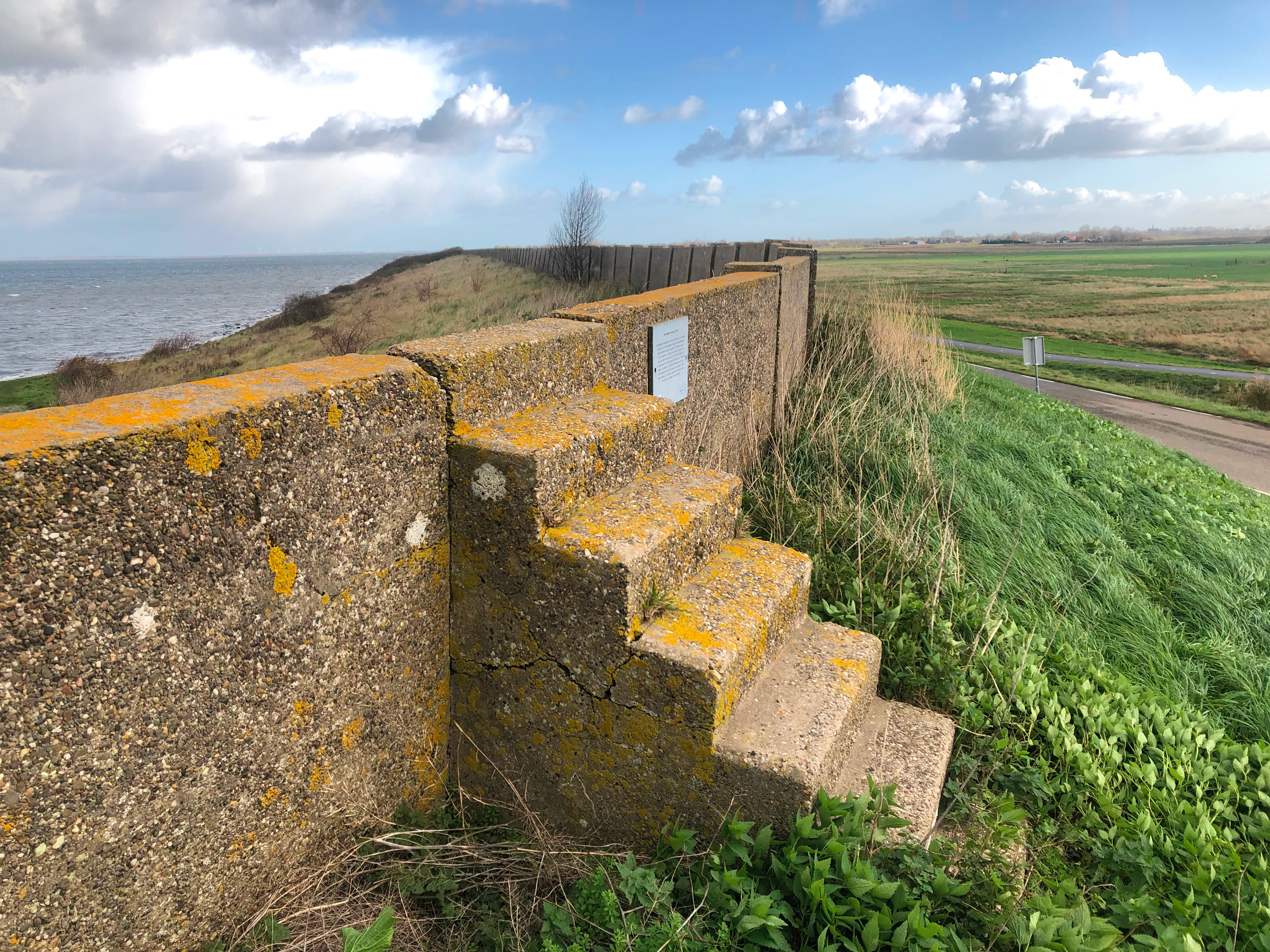
Part of the Scharendijke-Den Osse Muralt Wall.

The long Muralt Wall on the old sea dike that runs from Scharendijke to Den Osse along the Grevelingen is the most impressive example of Muralt Wall. For this reason, it is the only one in Zeeland that is protected as a Rijksmonument. The structure begins to the west of Scharendijke, near the small pavilion (‘Koepeltje’) and continues to Den Osse (Langendijk). At this end on the landward side, there are inlagen and cart tracks dating from the fifteenth and sixteenth centuries.

== Harbour and diving site ==
Den Osse has its own harbour. In 2010 the harbour of Den Osse was renovated by the municipality.

In 2013 a new jetty was constructed along the breakwater in Den Osse’s harbour, for the Dutch Navy. The “Defence Diving Group” (DDG) uses the Grevelingenmeer to train divers, as it contains a deep diving pit. At this jetty, the vessels Cerberus, Argus, Nautilus, Hydra, Soemba are moored, depending on the specific diving training for which they are used.

=== Diving ===
Den Osse is a popular diving location with increasing popularity during the 2010s and the diving parking lot was expanded. The water is known for having dahlia anemones and there was a special route to see multiple of them.

The diving site at the harbour of Den Osse is characterized by a shallow, biologically rich zone and a deeper sloping seabed around a breakwater, with generally good visibility and varied substrates such as sand and oyster beds. The site supports diverse marine life, including gobies, crustacean and occasional nocturnal species, and is valued despite limited onshore facilities and a relatively long access walk.

== Notable inhabitants ==
- Laura Dekker (born 1995), sailor.
