= Adriaan Engelvaart =

Dutch military commander and politician

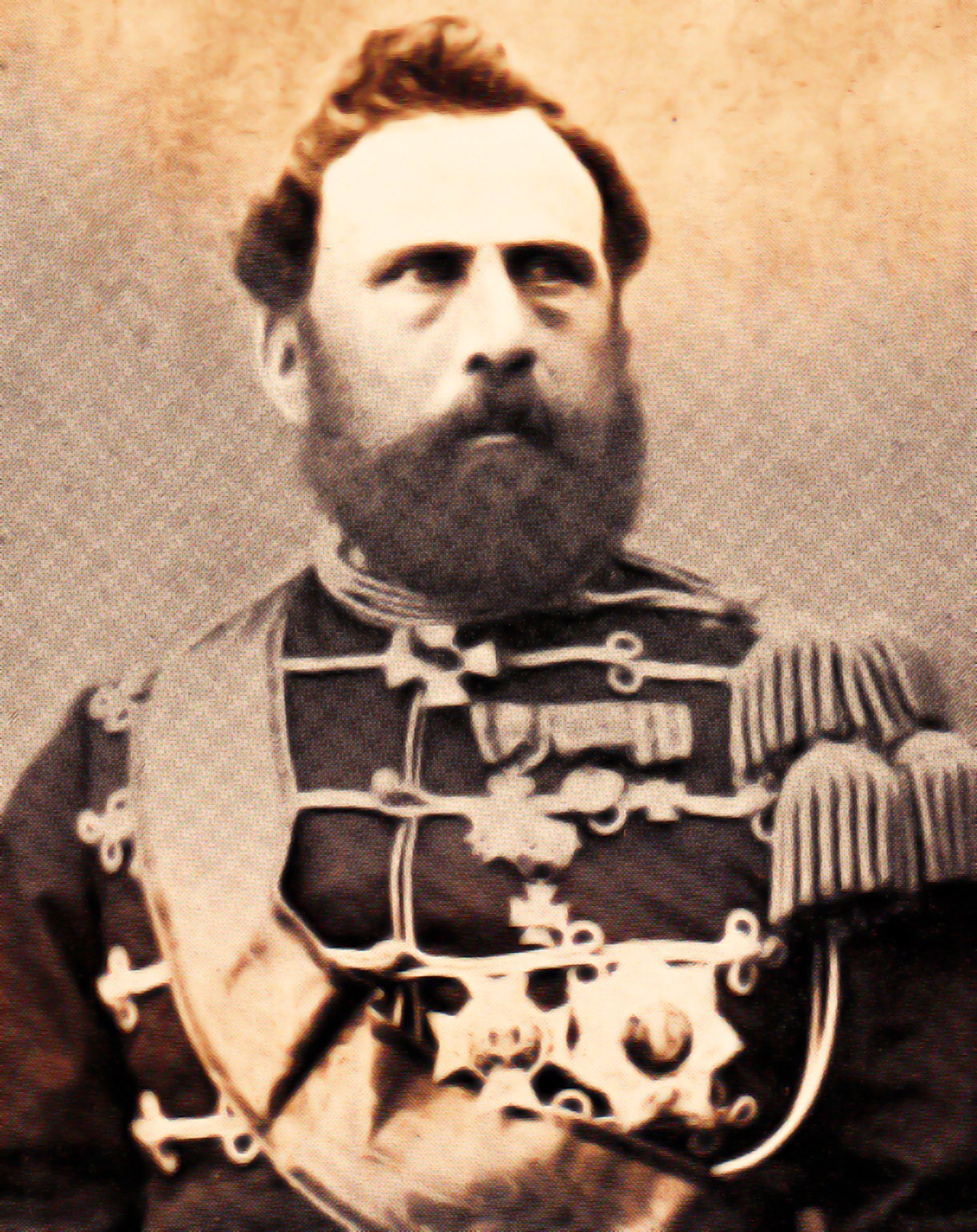
- Adriaan Engelvaart.
- Born: June 30, 1812; Looperskapelle, First French Empire
- Died: February 3, 1893 (aged 80) The Hague, Kingdom of the Netherlands
- Allegiance: Netherlands
- Rank: Commander
- Other work: Politician

Adriaan Engelvaart (30 June 1812, Looperskapelle – 3 February 1893, The Hague) was a Dutch military commander and politician.

Engelvaart was an infantry officer who served two periods as governor of the Koninklijke Militaire Academie in 1868-1871 and 1872-1876, spending the intervening period as minister of war in the cabinet of Johan Rudolph Thorbecke.
