= Muralt Wall =

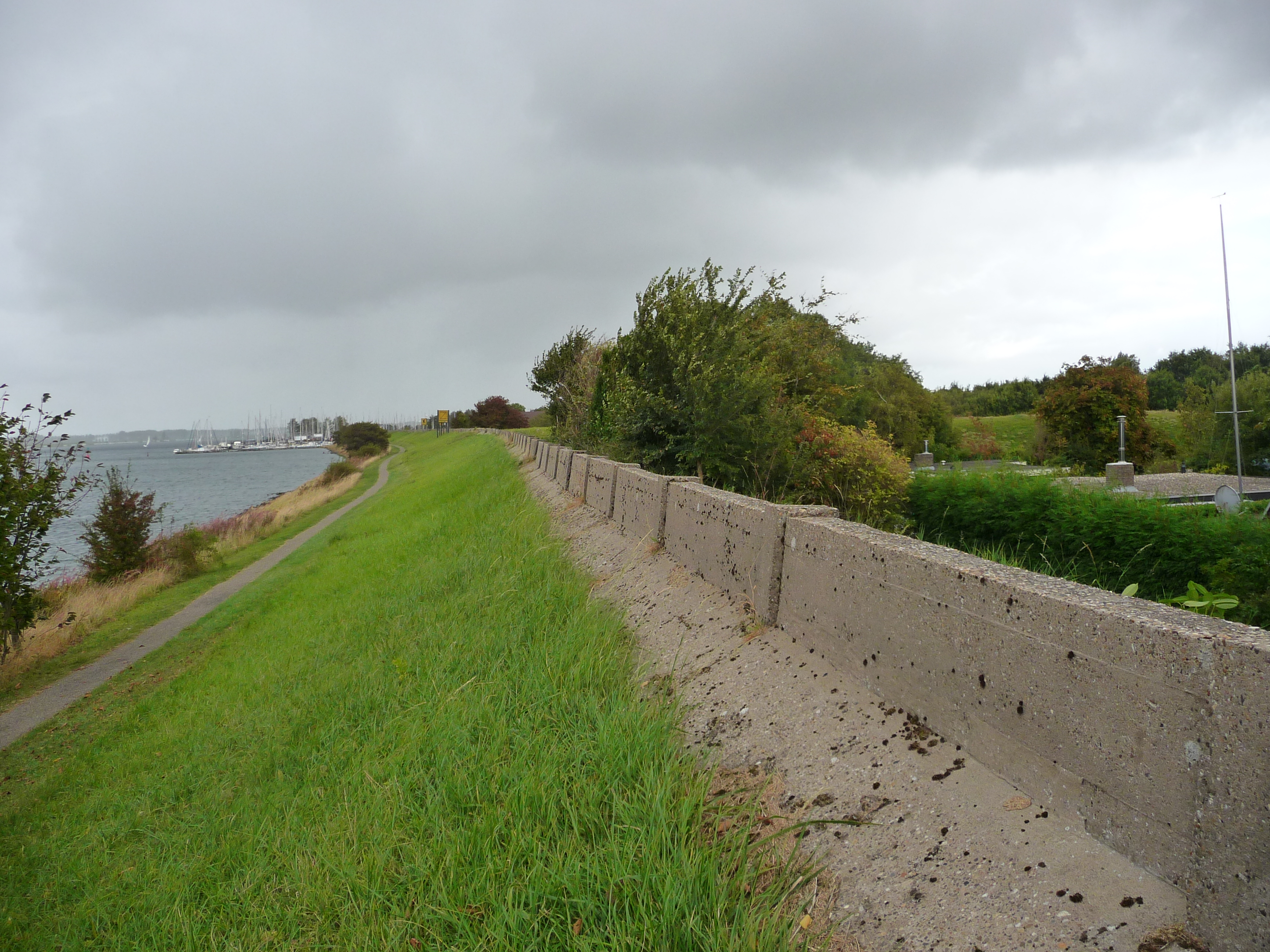
Muralt wall near Wolphaartsdijk

A muralt wall is a small wall on top of a dyke, that was used as an alternative and cheaper way of raising the dykes. A muralt wall consists of three or four horizontal concrete plates of about a meter high in between concrete uprights.

Muralt walls were invented by R.R.L. de Muralt, who was head of technical service of the Schouwen water authority between 1903 and 1913. After the storm surge of 1906 de Muralt developed a cheap way to raise dykes without having to widen the dyke's body. Between 1906 and 1935 around 120 km of muralt walls were put into place, about a third of all Zeelandish coastal dykes at the time. However, during the North Sea flood of 1953 it turned out that they were not adequate. Because of this most Muralt walls were removed during the dyke heightening after 1953.

Around Wolphaartsdijk, the Rattekaai, Scharendijke, Kortgene and Terneuzen diverse remnants of the muralt walls have been preserved. These remnants have gained the status of rijksmonument.

== See also ==
- List of Rijksmonuments
