= Jillian Schlesinger =

American filmmaker

Jillian Schlesinger is an American filmmaker known for collaborative youth-driven documentaries.

== Maidentrip ==
In 2009, Schlesinger read a New York Times op-ed about a Dutch youth named Laura Dekker with intentions to sail around the world alone at the age of 14. The story captured her attention and she made an effort to get in touch with Dekker, who was notably media-shy at the time. Dekker responded positively to the idea of a collaboration with the first-time director and the two set off on the adventure of making a documentary together. Working with an all-women crew, Schlesinger met Dekker 10 times over the course of the 17-month voyage around the world, including a three-week passage across the Pacific Ocean on another sailboat.

After Dekker successfully completed her circumnavigation in January 2012 at the age of 16, it took a year to complete the film, with Dekker visiting New York to work with Schlesinger and editor Penelope Falk. Maidentrip had its world premiere at SXSW Film Festival in March 2013 where it won the Visions Audience Award. The film was subsequently acquired and released by First Run Features.

== Hummingbirds ==
In 2018, Schlesinger met Silvia Del Carmen Castaños and Estefanía Contreras through a magnet filmmaking program for youth in Laredo, Texas. They began a collaboration on a feature documentary called Hummingbirds, starring and directed by Castaños and Contreras. Schlesinger produced, edited, and co-directed the film. Hummingbirds premiered at the 73rd Berlinale where it won the Grand Prix for Best Feature Film in Generation 14+ competition. In 2025, Hummingbirds was nominated for Independent Spirit Award for Best Documentary and a GLAAD Media Award for Outstanding Documentary.
