= Ellemeet =

- Village
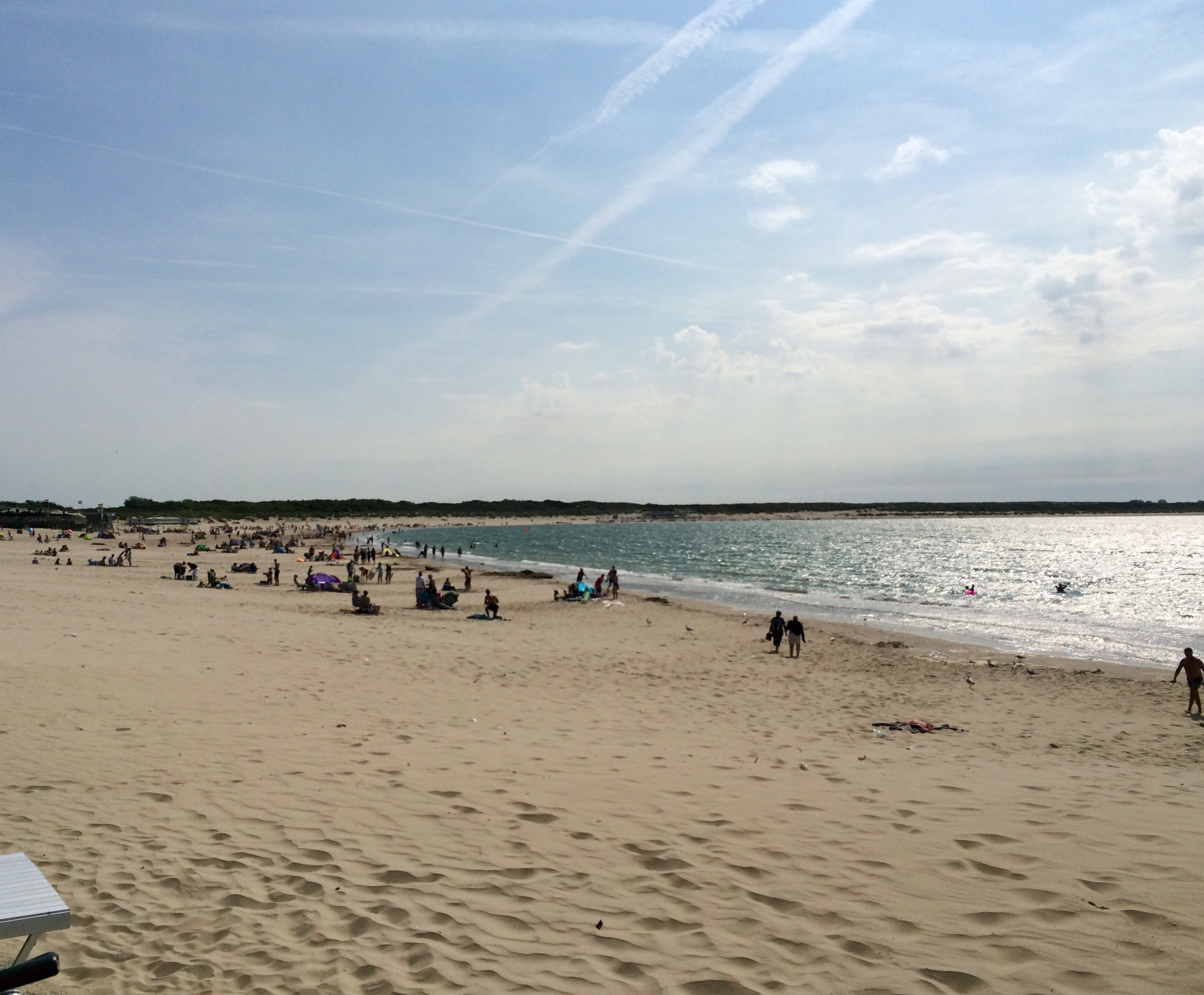
- Beach at Ellemeet

- Coat of arms

- Location in the province of Zeeland in the Netherlands Ellemeet (Netherlands)
- Coordinates: 51°43′47″N 3°48′59″E
- Country: Netherlands
- Province: Zeeland
- Municipality: Schouwen-Duiveland

Area
  - Total: 6.25 km^{2} (2.41 sq mi)
- Elevation: 0.5 m (1.6 ft)

Population (2021)
  - Total: 355
  - Density: 56.8/km^{2} (147/sq mi)
- Time zone: UTC+1 (CET)
  - Summer (DST): UTC+2 (CEST)
- Postal code: 4323
- Dialing code: 0111

Ellemeet is a village in the Dutch province of Zeeland. It is a part of the municipality of Schouwen-Duiveland, and lies about 26 km west of Hellevoetsluis.

== History ==
The village was first mentioned in 1236 as "Henricus de Ellimed", and means "hayland of Ello (person)". Ellemeet is a dike village without a church which developed in the 16th century along the Kuijersdam after the previous village was flooded. The new village was originally called Oudendijke, however in 1961, the name of the original village was adopted.

The grist mill ’t Hert was built in 1748 and remained in operation until 1996. The original village did have a church, however it was destroyed in 1575 during the Siege of Zierikzee.

Ellemeet was home to 467 people in 1840. The village was severely damaged during the North Sea flood of 1953, and was rebuilt further north.

Ellemeet was a separate municipality until 1961, when it was merged into Middenschouwen. Between 1965 and 1971, the Brouwersdam was built as part of the Delta Works to protect Zeeland. The dam resulted in the creation of the Grevelingenmeer. Recreational facilities and holiday homes were created along the lake. In 1997, it became part of the municipality of Schouwen-Duiveland.

== Gallery ==
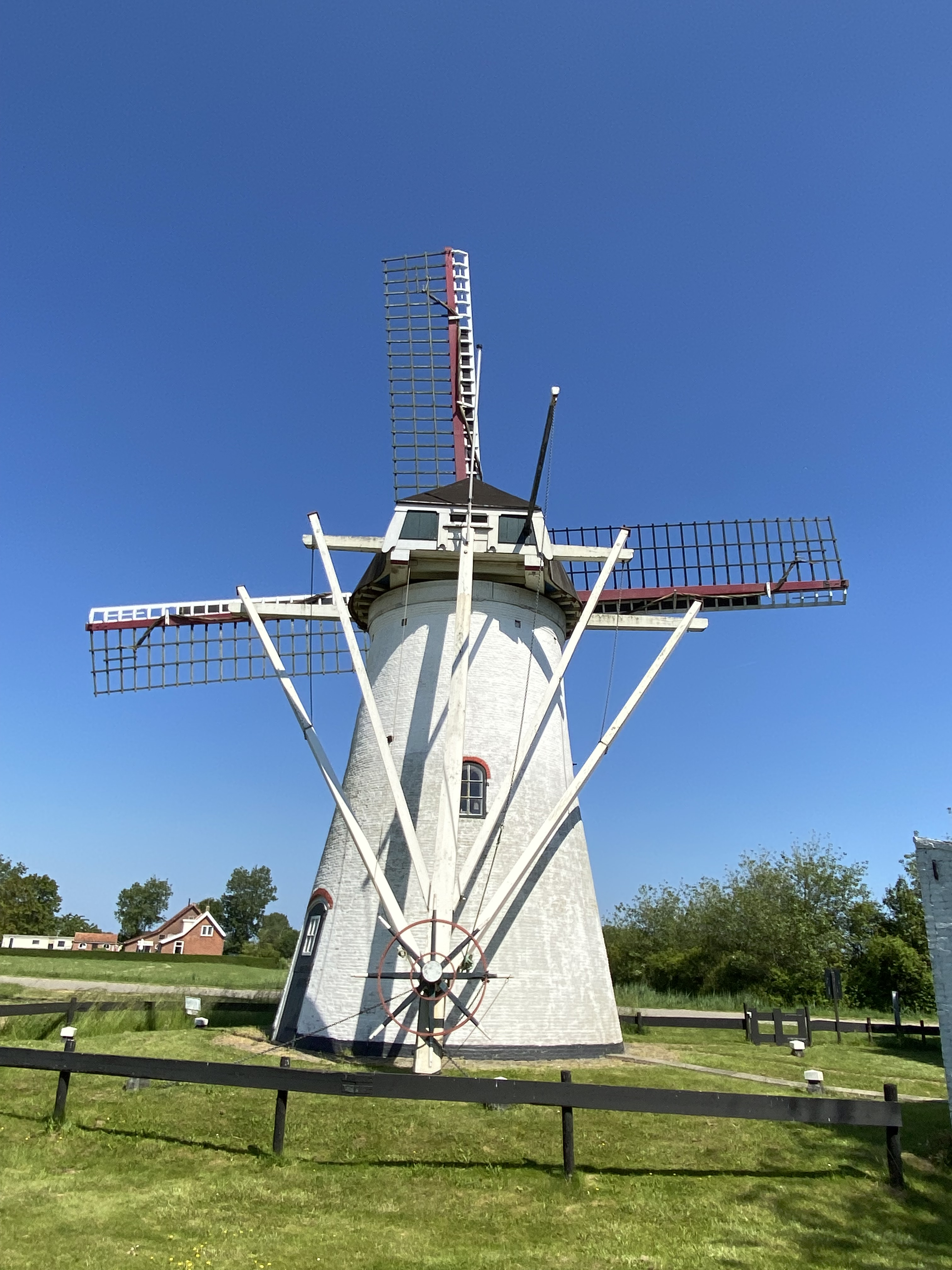
Wind mill 't Hert

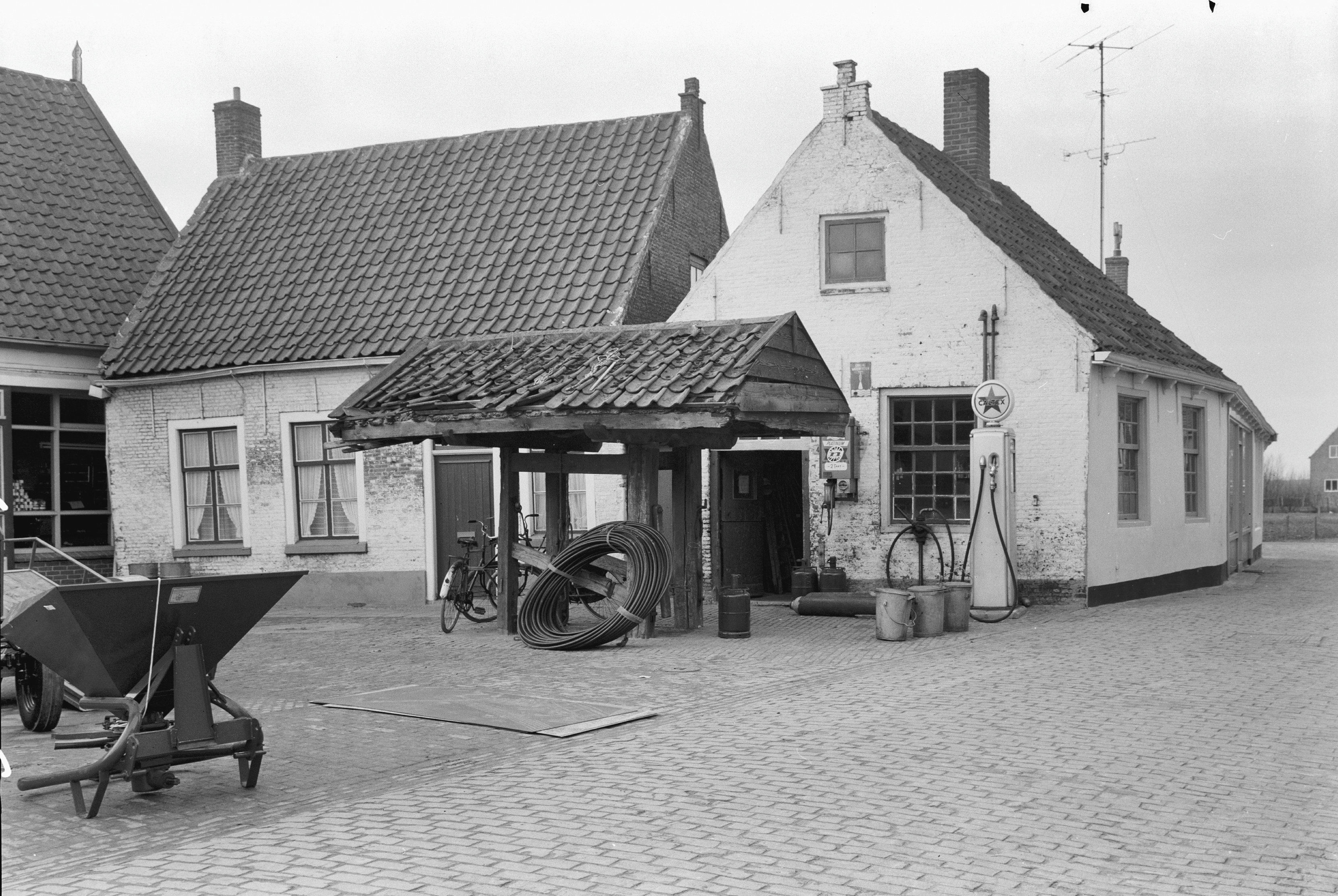
Village street (1965)
