= Klaaskinderenkerke =

Coordinates: 51°44′27″N 3°52′25″E

Coat of arms of Klaaskinderkerke

Klaaskinderenkerke (also spelled 'Klaaskinderkerke') is a former village in the Dutch province of Zeeland. The polder Klaaskinderen was flooded on December 14, 1511, and was never reclaimed again. The church of Klaaskinderenkerke disappeared in this flood, and in the 19th century, only a small hamlet was left.

The hamlet has now disappeared from the maps. It was located east of the village of Scharendijke.

Klaaskinderkerke was a separate municipality until 1813, when it was merged with Duivendijke.
