= Elkerzee =

- Hamlet
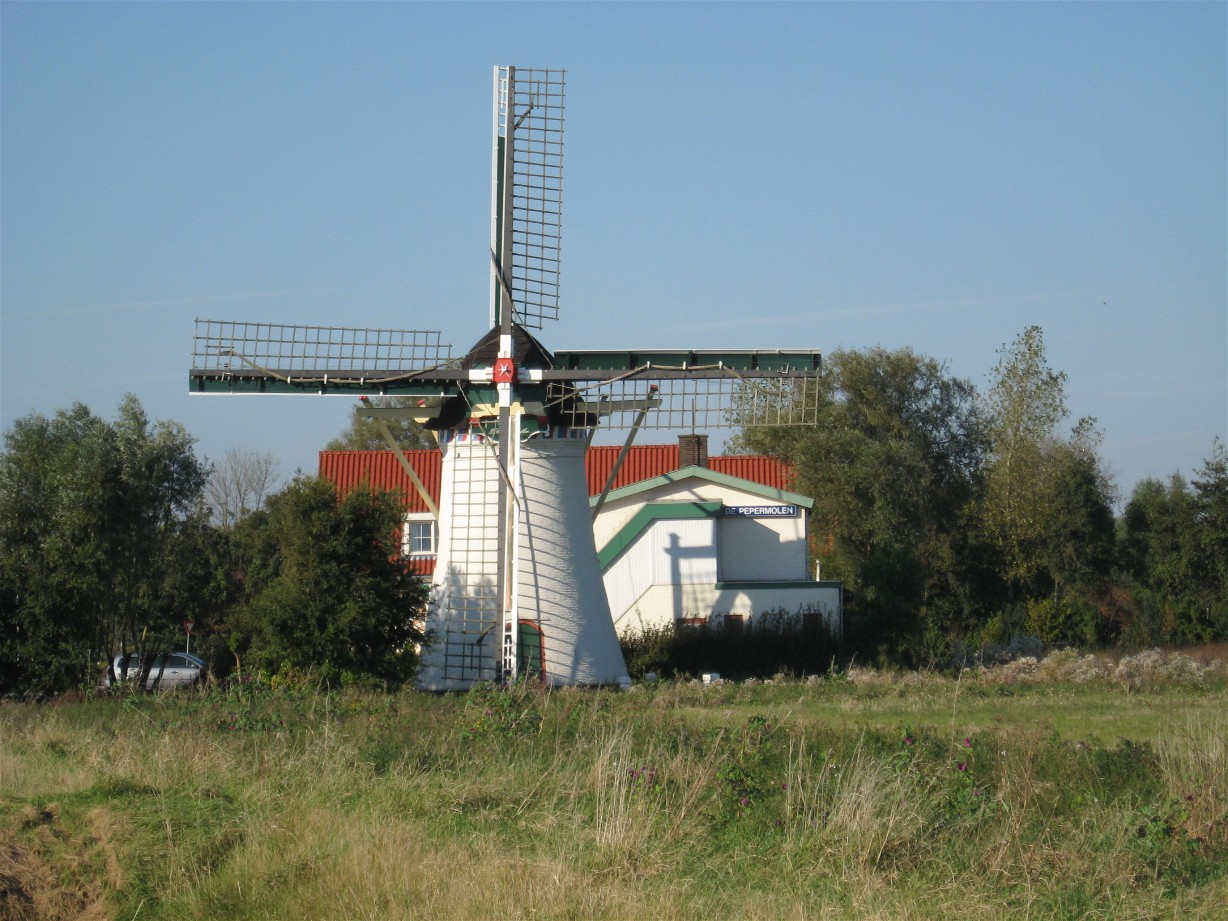
- Wind mill De Lelie

- Coat of arms

- Location in the province of Zeeland in the Netherlands Elkerzee (Netherlands)
- Coordinates: 51.72432°N 3.84297°E
- Country: Netherlands
- Province: Zeeland
- Municipality: Schouwen-Duiveland
- Time zone: UTC+1 (CET)
  - Summer (DST): UTC+2 (CEST)
- Postal code: 4322
- Dialing code: 0111

Elkerzee is a hamlet in the Dutch province of Zeeland. It is a part of the municipality of Schouwen-Duiveland, and lies about 1 km south of Scharendijke.

Elkerzee is not a statistical entity, and the postal authorities have placed it under Scharendijke. It has its own place name signs. It was home to 489 people in 1840. Nowadays it consists of about 10 houses. A church was built in 1741, but was demolished in 1958, because a new church had been built in neighboring Scharendijke.

The grist mill De Lelie was built in 1868 and decommissioned in 1960. In 2008, it was bought and turned into a restaurant specializing in pancakes. The flour for the pancakes is ground by the wind mill.

Elkerzee was a separate municipality until 1961, when it was merged into Middenschouwen.

== Gallery ==
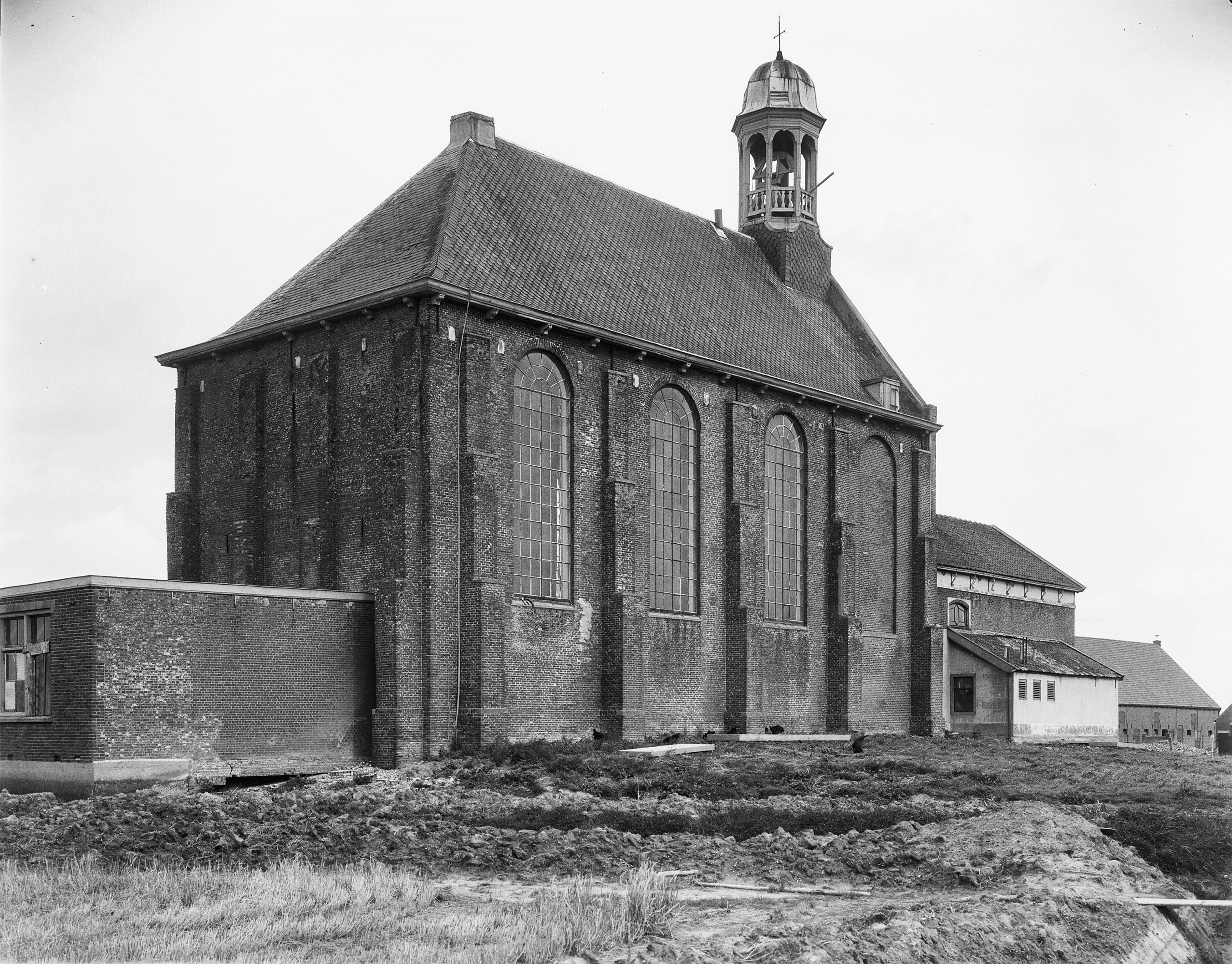
Former church of Elkerzee

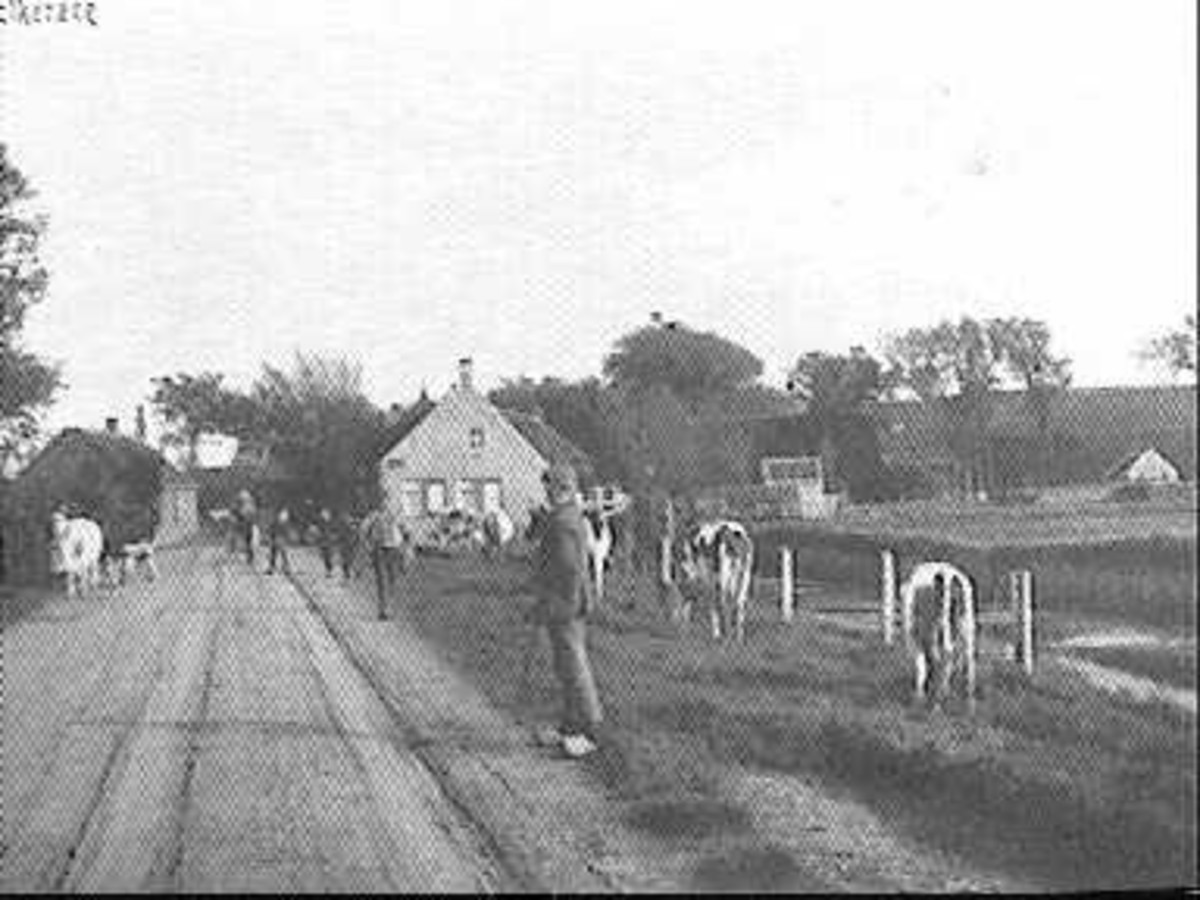
Village view (1920)
