= Laura Dekker =

Dutch solo sailor (born 1995)

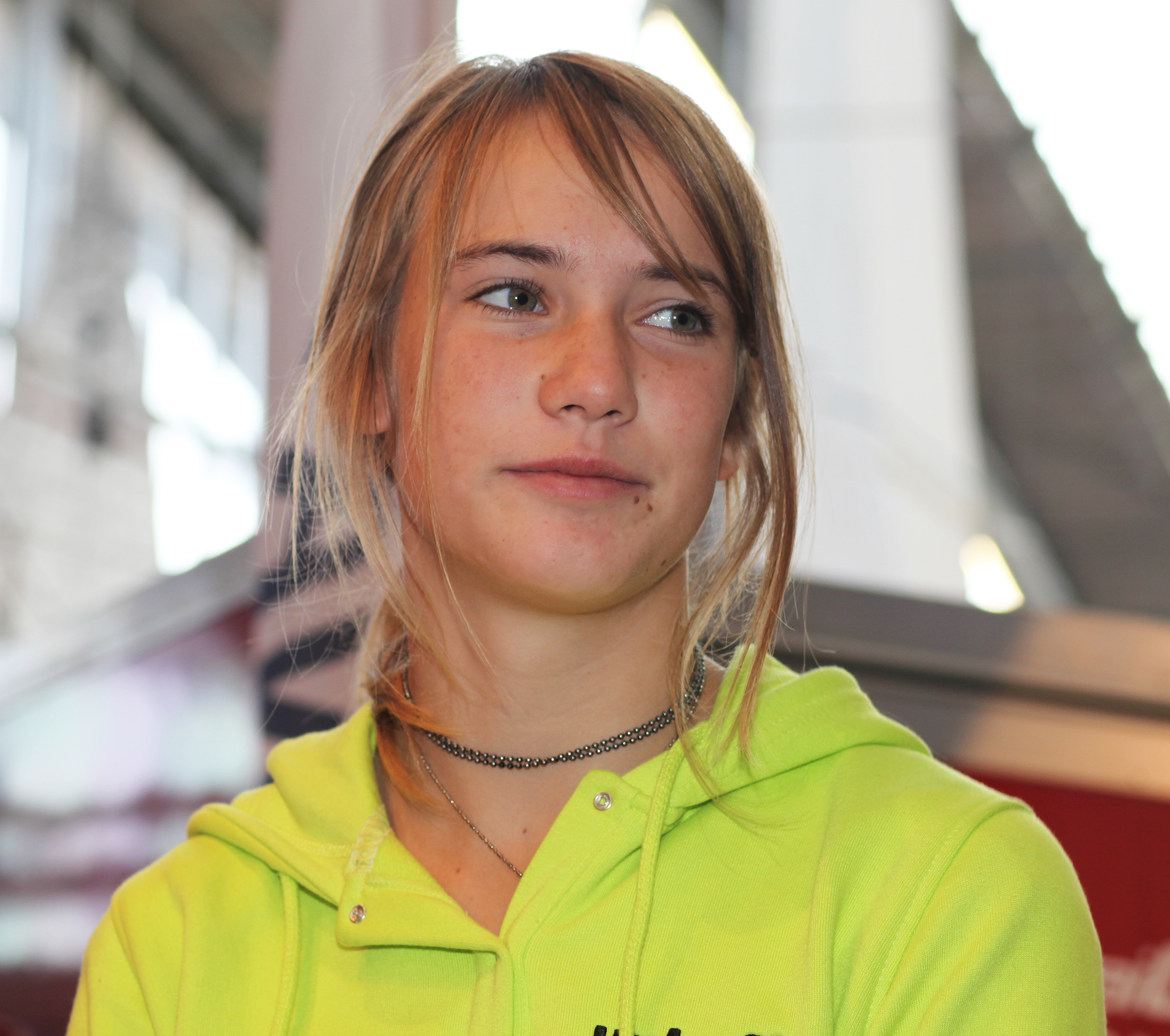
- Dekker in 2011
- Born: 20 September 1995 (age 31); Whangārei, New Zealand
- Citizenship: Dutch; German; New Zealander
- Occupation: Sailor
- Known for: Youngest person to sail solo around the world
- Spouse: Daniël Thielmann (m. 2015; div. 2017)
- Children: 2
- Website: lauradekkerworldsailingfoundation.com

Dekker's solo circumnavigation route

Laura Dekker (Dutch pronunciation: [ˈlʌuraː ˈdɛkər]; born 20 September 1995) is a Dutch sailor. In 2009, she announced her plan to become the youngest person to circumnavigate the globe single-handed. A Dutch court stepped in, owing to the objections of the local authorities, and prevented Laura from departing while under shared custody of both her parents. In July 2010, a Dutch family court ended this custody arrangement, and the record-breaking attempt finally began on 21 August 2010. Dekker successfully completed the solo circumnavigation in a 12.4-metre (40 ft) two-masted ketch named Guppy, arriving in Simpson Bay, Sint Maarten, 518 days later at the age of 16.

== Early life ==
Dekker was born in the city of Whangārei, New Zealand, during a seven-year sailing trip by her parents. Her father, Dick Dekker, is Dutch and her mother, Babs Müller, is German. Dekker has Dutch, German, and New Zealand citizenship. Her parents divorced in 2002. She lived with her father after the separation of her parents, and her younger sister Kim went to live with her mother.

Dekker spent the first five years of her life at sea and sailed often with her father after the family's return to the Netherlands. She has owned several boats, all named Guppy. The first was an Optimist dinghy she received for her sixth birthday, and which she promptly learned to sail solo, initially accompanied by her father on a windsurfer.

For her eighth birthday (in 2003), she received the book Maiden Voyage, Tania Aebi's memoir of her round-the-world sailing trip.

In the summer of 2006, after assisting her father in a 24-hour sailing race aboard a friend's Hurley 700, she received permission from the boat's owner to borrow it for personal use, in return for cleaning and maintenance. It was just at the 7 m (23 ft) limit below which Dutch law imposes on captains under the age of 16. Sailing it often, she christened this boat Guppy as well. In the summer of 2007, she took it on a more ambitious 6-week sailing tour of the Wadden Sea, accompanied by her dog Spot.

Over the following winter, Dekker searched for her own Hurley 700, and bought one with a loan from her father. This boat was also christened Guppy, and she spent her entire 2008 summer vacation aboard it, cruising around the Netherlands.

== 2009 trip to England ==
Over the following school year, she began preparing herself and Guppy for open-ocean sailing, with the goal of a round-the-world tour. In March, her father told her to gain some experience with the open sea by first sailing to England. This was intended to discourage her; the strong currents, rough weather, and heavy shipping make the English Channel notoriously difficult for sailboats.

Dekker spent the next eight weeks preparing Guppy for that trip. On the evening of Friday, 1 May, at the beginning of a 12-day school vacation, she sailed away from Maurik without specifying a destination to her father. She sailed to the coast and arrived in Maassluis Saturday afternoon. Early Sunday morning, she set out across the Channel, but weak winds delayed her arrival until Monday morning. Docking in Lowestoft, she e-mailed word of her success from a local library. Local authorities requested her father to come and accompany her on her return voyage. Her father responded that she could sail back on her own. the authorities placed her in a children's home until he came to retrieve her. He returned her to her boat and then flew home. She left England on Monday, 11 May. With a strong wind this time, up to force 7, the return trip was much faster, reaching Rotterdam by the morning of the 12th and arriving home that evening.

== Plans for a global circumnavigation ==
In August 2009, Dekker announced her plan for a two-year solo sailing voyage around the globe in the Dutch national newspaper, Algemeen Dagblad. Her father was in support of her plans. Dekker planned to sail a seagoing 38 ft (12 m) Jeanneau Gin Fizz ketch, also named Guppy. The boat was equipped for long-distance sailing and adapted for solo-circumnavigation. The planned route started from Portugal westwards, to cruise the Caribbean and then to go through Panama and past Indonesia. She then planned either to go past Somalia to the Mediterranean, or around Africa, should piracy become a serious concern. Her plan was to make around 26 stops. The original plan called for Dekker to be met at some locations by family, which also would help her along difficult spots such as the Panama Canal. In actuality, for cost reasons, people from home (mostly family members) met her only two times, although she was given some assistance by other leisure sailors she met, for example through the Panama Canal. The plan said she would not be sailing for more than three weeks between stops. However, after Australia, she decided to skip some stops, which meant completing two 6- to 7-week-long legs.

An Iridium Communications tracking system onboard allowed the family in the Netherlands to monitor her course closely. She planned to avoid the stormy Roaring Forties, although the South Africa route gave her at least one big storm.

Her education was conducted through the Wereldschool (Worldschool), an educational institution that provided her with material for self-learning.

From the beginning of her solo circumnavigation in late August 2010, Dekker wrote a weekly column for the Algemeen Dagblad of Rotterdam. English and German translations of her columns are available.

== Government objections ==
The local authorities at Wijk bij Duurstede, her place of residence, objected and the Child Welfare Office became involved. A family court judgment was obtained that placed Dekker in shared parental custody with the Council for Child Care who stopped her departure. The shared custody was to last until July 2010, but a successful application by the child protection agency saw that extended until at least August of that year.

Dekker's plan and the intervention by the government received extensive international attention.

According to Dutch inland shipping regulations, it is prohibited for a captain younger than sixteen years to sail a boat longer than 7 m (23 ft) in Dutch waters; thus Dekker would not be allowed to use the boat for any solo excursions within the Netherlands until 2012. She still did so, with the effect that the police required her father to come and sail the boat home together with her. The circumnavigation, however, would not start in the Netherlands, thus Dutch naval regulations do not apply to her voyage.

On 18 December 2009, a member of Dekker's family reported her missing to the police. A farewell letter was left for her father, although her boat remained in the port of Maurik. On 20 December, Dekker was found safely on Sint Maarten. Two days later, she returned to Amsterdam where she was questioned by the police.

On 26 December 2009, it was reported that another court in the Netherlands overruled the objections of the social workers and permitted her to begin her circumnavigation in September of the following year when she turned 15.

On 27 July 2010, the Dutch court ended supervision of Dekker, and decided it was "up to the girl's parents to decide whether she can make the trip." Dekker reported that she would depart "within two weeks".

Dekker later commented about the authorities in an interview, saying "They thought it was dangerous. Well, everywhere is dangerous. They don't sail and they don't know what boats are, and they are scared of them."

While in Australia, Dekker gave an interview in which she admitted that she was not doing much schoolwork since she was busy with sailing, maintenance, customs procedures and other tasks related to her journey. This led to press and other commentators suggesting that she had quit school and thrown the school books overboard. She tried to correct this by saying that she had not stopped studying totally and would continue her academic studies after returning to the Netherlands.

On 14 October 2011, Dekker was nominated for the Conny van Rietschoten Trophy, a very prestigious Dutch sailing award, in the ocean sailing category.

Preceding Dekker's journey, the sailing press appeared rather sceptical, but became more positive during the journey, and acclaimed her after the Indian Ocean crossing and the Cape of Good Hope passage. General media in countries she visited have often also been impressed, at least on later stages. General media in the Netherlands mostly avoided writing about her during the journey, since the journey went mostly as planned. An exception was the newspaper Algemeen Dagblad which had a weekly column about her and displayed a standing link on the front web page to a collection of articles about the teenage sailor. However, on 4 January 2012, Dutch and German press started to write much more about her, both about the fact that she soon was expected to finish the circumnavigation, and about the fact that she did not want to return to the Netherlands, but to settle in New Zealand. After the arrival on 21 January 2012, there were articles in newspapers all over the world.

== Boat ==
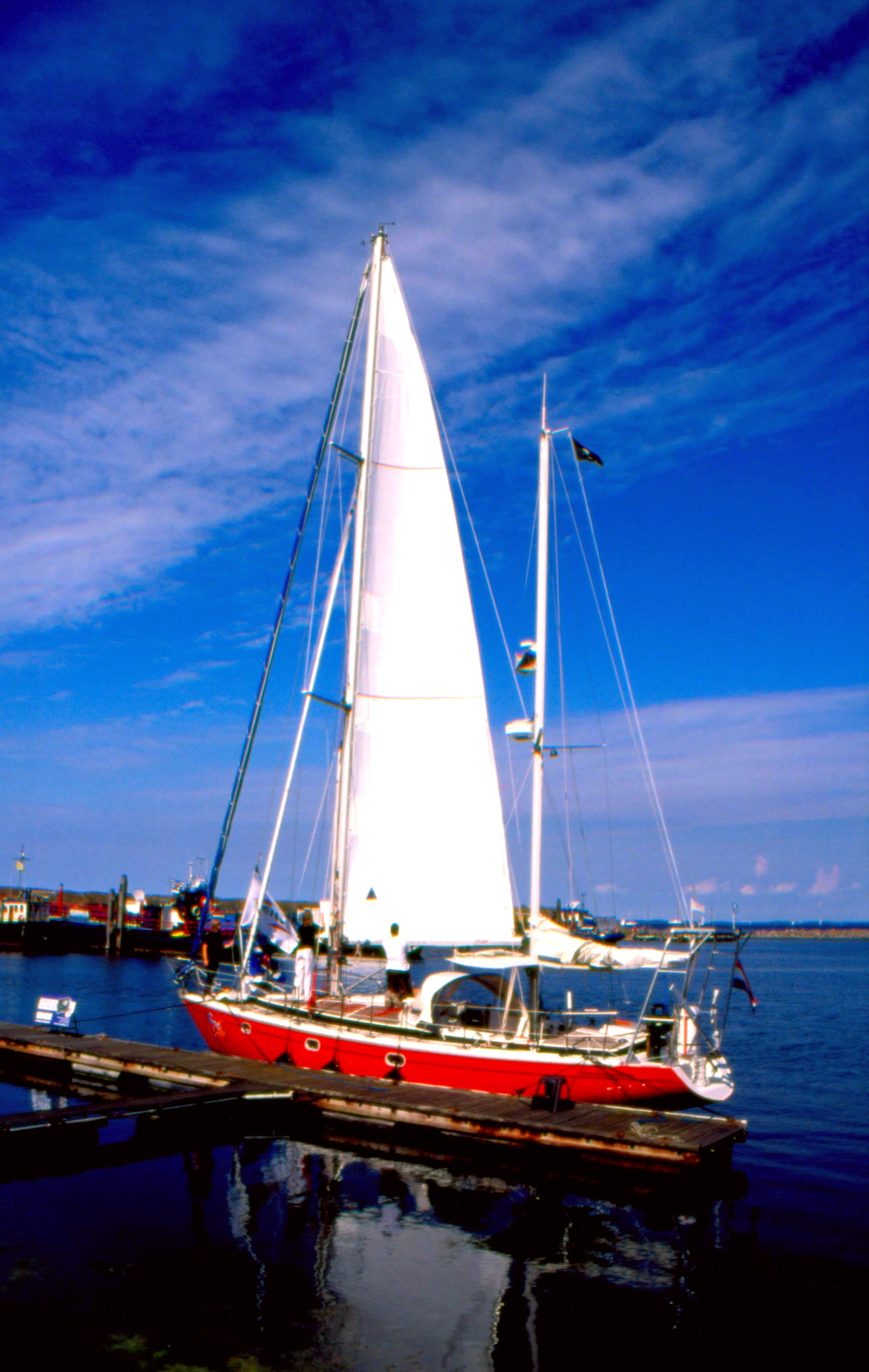
Yacht Guppy in Den Osse, Netherlands, on 3 August 2010

Dekker used a French-built 12.3-metre (40 ft) two-masted Jeanneau Gin Fizz ketch, which she named Guppy, same as her earlier boats.

== 2010–2011 solo circumnavigation ==
Dekker sailed from Den Osse, Netherlands, on 4 August 2010, headed for Portugal. This segment did not constitute part of the solo circumnavigation, as her father was on board to coach her and test the new boat. The published plan was that the solo voyage would commence from Lisbon. Instead, Dekker and her father sailed to Portimão, arriving on 15 August. She sailed with others from Portimão to Gibraltar on 18–20 August, because according to Portuguese law, she was too young to be formally qualified to captain her ship (Gibraltar is a British Overseas Territory subject to British law, though Dekker made her departure from Gibraltar in secret in order to avoid both the press and any maritime police).

2010–2012 solo circumnavigation progress:

- Departed Gibraltar on 21 August 2010.
- Arrived at Lanzarote on 25 August.
- Stayed in the Canary Islands for several weeks because of the Atlantic hurricane season.
- Departed Gran Canaria on 10 November for Cape Verde.
- Commenced Atlantic crossing from Cape Verde to Sint Maarten—a distance of 2,200 nautical miles (4,100 km; 2,500 mi)—on 2 December; finished when she reached Simpson Bay Lagoon on 19 December; having encountered calm weather on this leg of her journey, used the engine for two days in order to arrive on time.
- Served as crew member for ten days on the tall ship Stad Amsterdam, departing from Sint Maarten on 5 January 2011.
- Departed Sint Maarten on 20 January; visited the islands of Îles des Saintes, Dominica, Bonaire and San Blas Islands, all located in the Caribbean.
- Flew home on 27 February; stayed to 10 March to speak at a boat show and other places, now a figure of considerable media attention in the Netherlands.
- Completed the passage of the Panama Canal on 11 April 2011; visited Pearl Islands thereafter.
- Crossed the Equator on the evening of 25 April; reached the Galápagos Islands the following day.
- Departed the Galápagos Islands on 7 May and arrived at Hiva Oa, Marquesas Islands on 25 May, having sailed about 2,960 nautical miles (5,480 km; 3,410 mi) in 18 days, the longest leg so far; encountered open sea only, with no islands near the route.
- Sailed from Marquesas Islands to Tahiti between 1 and 8 June, a journey of 770 nautical miles (1,430 km; 890 mi); demanding leg of the journey with shifting winds, many reefs, ships, and little sleep.
- Visited Moorea and Bora Bora, and then sailed the 1,400 nautical miles (2,600 km; 1,600 mi) journey to Vavaʻu, Tonga in 12 days, where she arrived 8 July.
- Arrived 17 July 2011 at Suva, Fiji, having sailed for four days, and on 30 July at Port Vila, Vanuatu after having sailed for three days.
- Sailed from Vanuatu on 8 August, heading for Darwin, Australia; arrived in Darwin on 25 August after one of the toughest legs of her journey, which included passage through Torres Strait, filled with reefs, islands and large ships; father visited her in Darwin, their first meeting since she had visited the Netherlands in March 2011; together, undertook a major overhaul of the boat; celebrated Dekker's 16th birthday.
- Departed Darwin on 25 September, heading west; published information about this leg of her journey in her blog following about two weeks delay, because of security concerns regarding Indian Ocean pirates.
- Sailed to Durban, South Africa, arriving 12 November, after 47 days at sea non-stop; reported wind varying from dead calm to hard wind that often shifted direction; sometimes encountered rough waves (distance Darwin–Durban is 5,540 nautical miles (10,260 km; 6,380 mi)).
- Arrived at Port Elizabeth, South Africa, on 18 November.
- Passed Cape Agulhas, South Africa, on 26 November, southernmost point on the African continent, and southernmost point of her journey; sailed thereafter a northerly course for the first time on her journey from the Netherlands.
- Passed the Cape of Good Hope on 27 November in rough weather; reached Cape Town the same day; father and journalists and the boats of the Volvo Ocean Race met her there.
- Sailed from Cape Town on 12 December, heading northwest.
- Reached the longitude of her unofficial starting point in the Netherlands on 20 December; had already crossed all longitudes in the course of her circumnavigation; faced another 4,800 nautical miles (8,900 km; 5,500 mi) for her official completion.
- Arrived in Simpson Bay on Sint Maarten on 21 January 2012 at approximately 3 p.m. local time, after a non-stop journey of 5,600 nautical miles (10,400 km; 6,400 mi) from Cape Town, thus completing her full circumnavigation of the world, at the age of 16 years, 123 days.
- The trip took 518 days or 74 weeks or 1 year, 5 months.

Maidentrip (2013), mostly shot by Dekker and directed by Jillian Schlesinger, is an 82-minute documentary video about this trip.

== Later activities ==
- In March 2013, Maidentrip, a film about Dekker's circumnavigation had its premiere at the South by Southwest Film Festival in the United States.
- During the summer of 2013, she took part in the recording (in Morocco) of the reality television show Atlas, which was broadcast in the Netherlands in August–October 2013.
- In autumn 2014, she took part in the Dutch reality show Expeditie Poolcirkel in north Scandinavia (broadcast 2015), which she won.
- In November 2014, Dekker's book One Girl, One Dream was published.
- On 20 February 2015, she obtained a Yachtmaster Ocean Certificate (also becoming the youngest person to do so in the process).
- She has been working towards doing long-distance educational sailings with children. She founded Laura Dekker World Sailing Foundation. She obtained a 21 meter (69 ft) long ship (named Guppy). In November 2020 Dekker and a young crew took away from Spain, heading for the Caribbean islands, and back.

== Guppy's fate ==
A February 2018 interview with the American Sailing Association announced "Dekker has donated her beloved Guppy, the very boat she did the trip on, to LifeSail." LifeSail is a Los Angeles non-profit organisation that uses sailing as a vehicle to teach life lessons to children.

On 20 August 2018, Dekker announced that Guppy was wrecked on a reef in the Pacific Ocean by LifeSail during its trip to Los Angeles. The boat was a total loss.

LifeSail released a public statement in March 2019 with a timeline of events that stated Dekker originally donated Guppy as a requirement to receive funds from a third party. Those funds would be used for her new boat, Guppy XL. Dekker blames LifeSail and Matt Schulz, alleging they broke their contract by sailing the vessel with inexperienced crew and mooring in unsafe locations. She claimed compensation for the loss of Guppy, as the donation contract with LifeSail specified that in the case of a total loss all insurance compensation would go to her, less any value added by LifeSail.

== Personal life ==
On 28 March 2015, when she was 19, Dekker married Daniel Thielmann, also resident in New Zealand. They have since divorced. She is now in a relationship with boat builder Sander Vogelenzang, with whom she has a son born in 2018. They had a second child in June 2022.
