= Middenschouwen =

Coordinates: 51°42′50″N 3°51′40″E

Middenschouwen is a former municipality in the Dutch province of Zeeland. It covered the central part of the island of Schouwen-Duiveland.

Middenschouwen was created in a merger of Duivendijke, Elkerzee, Ellemeet and Kerkwerve in 1961. It existed until 1997, when it was merged into the new municipality of Schouwen-Duiveland.
