= Brouwershaven =

- City
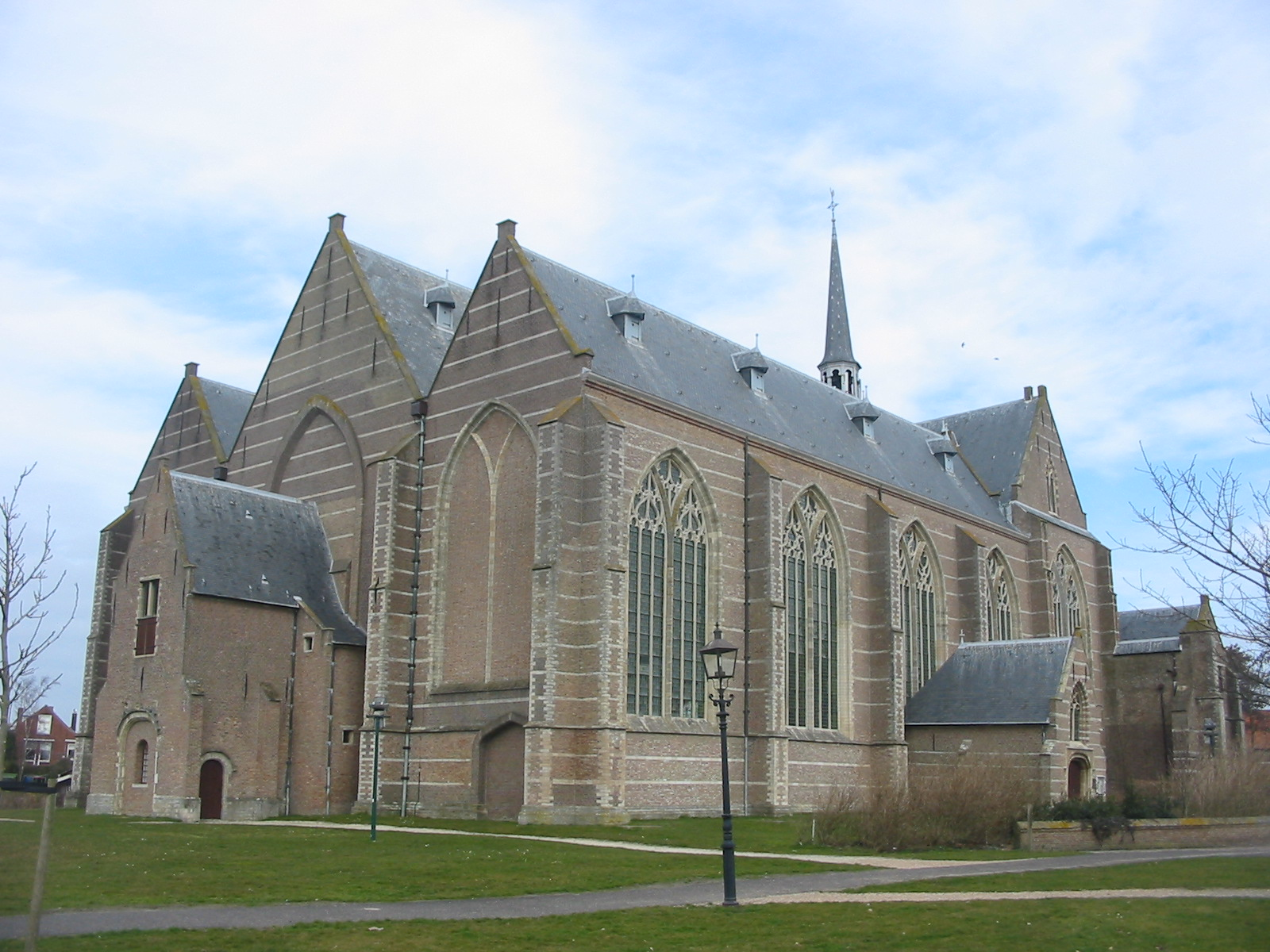
- The Church of Brouwershaven looks relatively large for the nowadays small town

- Flag Coat of arms
- Nickname: "Brouw"
- Location in the province of Zeeland in the Netherlands Brouwershaven (Netherlands)
- Coordinates: 51°43′35″N 3°54′51″E
- Country: Netherlands
- Province: Zeeland
- Municipality: Schouwen-Duiveland

Area
  - Total: 6.56 km^{2} (2.53 sq mi)
- Elevation: 2.3 m (7.5 ft)

Population (2021)
  - Total: 1,250
  - Density: 191/km^{2} (494/sq mi)
- Time zone: UTC+1 (CET)
  - Summer (DST): UTC+2 (CEST)
- Postal code: 4318
- Dialing code: 0111

Brouwershaven is a small city on the Grevelingen in the Dutch province of Zeeland. It is a part of the municipality of Schouwen-Duiveland, lies about 45 km southwest of Hellevoetsluis and 10 km north of Zierikzee.

Brouwershaven received city rights in 1477.

In 2023 the town of Brouwershaven had 1291 inhabitants. The built-up area of the town was 0.41 km^{2}, and contained 759 residences. The statistical area "Brouwershaven", which also can include the surrounding countryside, has a population of around 1540.

Brouwershaven was a separate municipality until 1997, when it was merged into Schouwen-Duiveland.

== History ==
Brouwershaven was founded in 1285 as a new harbor for Brijdorpe, although today the harbor has silted up. The town was built as a fortified bastide, and is considered to be the first of this type of settlement in the Netherlands.

The name Brouwershaven (Brewers Haven) is anecdotally thought to have originated from the import of Beer from Delft through the port. and is first mentioned in 1318. In 1403 the city obtained town rights, but had no seat in the States of Zeeland. In 1426, the town witnessed the Battle of Brouwershaven in which troops of Philip the Good, Duke of Burgundy, defeated an English force.

The history of Brouwershaven has always had a connection with the water. Fish and shellfish were an important source of income, as was trade in wine and beer, wood, stone, wool and flax, turnips and beets. Another staple industry of the town is salt from evaporated seawater.

In 1575 the little Bastide town was conquered by Spanish troops and then set on fire. From 1590 Brouwershaven was provided with earthen ramparts, surrounded by a moat. Five gates gave access to the city. In the flood of 1682 a part of the fortifications was destroyed. The fortress was dismantled in 1820; ramparts and moats to the east and north sides of the city, however, are preserved.

The 17th century was a heyday of the fishing port. However, with the development of larger ships came the problem of accessing the narrow port entrance, and its economy began to decline.

In the 19th century Brouwershaven experienced a slight revival when the Brielle Meuse and Goereese Gat silted up. Rotterdam threatened to become unreachable for ships, so some shipping stopped in Brouwershaven, where the cargo was transferred to smaller vessels. The government also built a large office for pilotage and for the tax authorities there. However, a new canal in 1872 eliminated its function in favor of Rotterdam again.

After the floods of 1953, improved connections and the Delta Works, the construction of a marina and promotion of tourism have once again improved the civic life of the town.

== Heraldry ==
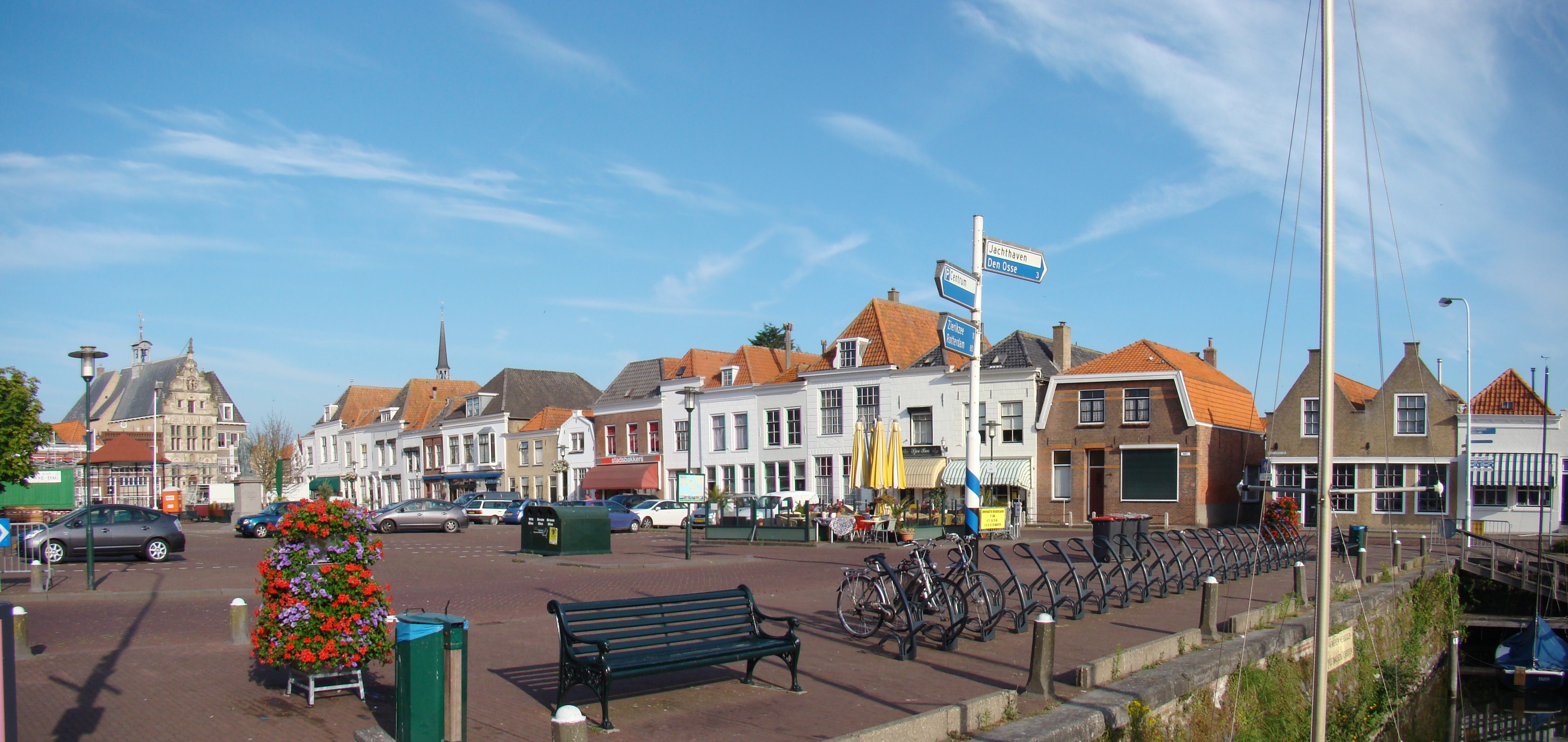
A plaza in the city

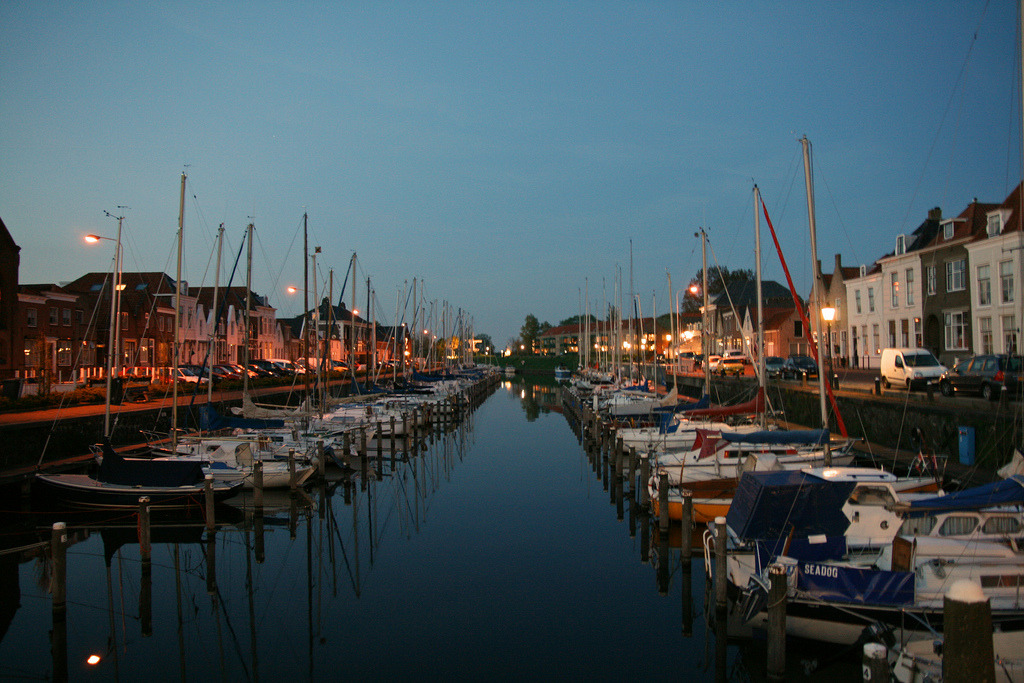
The harbour

A shield for the town appears as early as 1540 and consists of a gold eagle sable, the arms of Louis of Bavaria, with chest arms of his wife Margrethe II of Hainaut. This diamond-shaped shield has four lions the position which has changed over time, in the current version they are away and turn each other in pairs. In addition to the eagle stands in gold a lion rampant gules (red), from the shield of Holland. The shield is covered by a golden crown with five leaves. Such a heraldic crown was actually awarded only to towns with a seat on the provincial council and Brouwershaven was granted this improperly in this case because Brouwershaven never had a seat in the States of Zeeland.

The shield was confirmed as municipal coat of arms on July 31, 1817. After the local government reorganization of 1961 the Shield was retained for the new municipality.

== Images ==
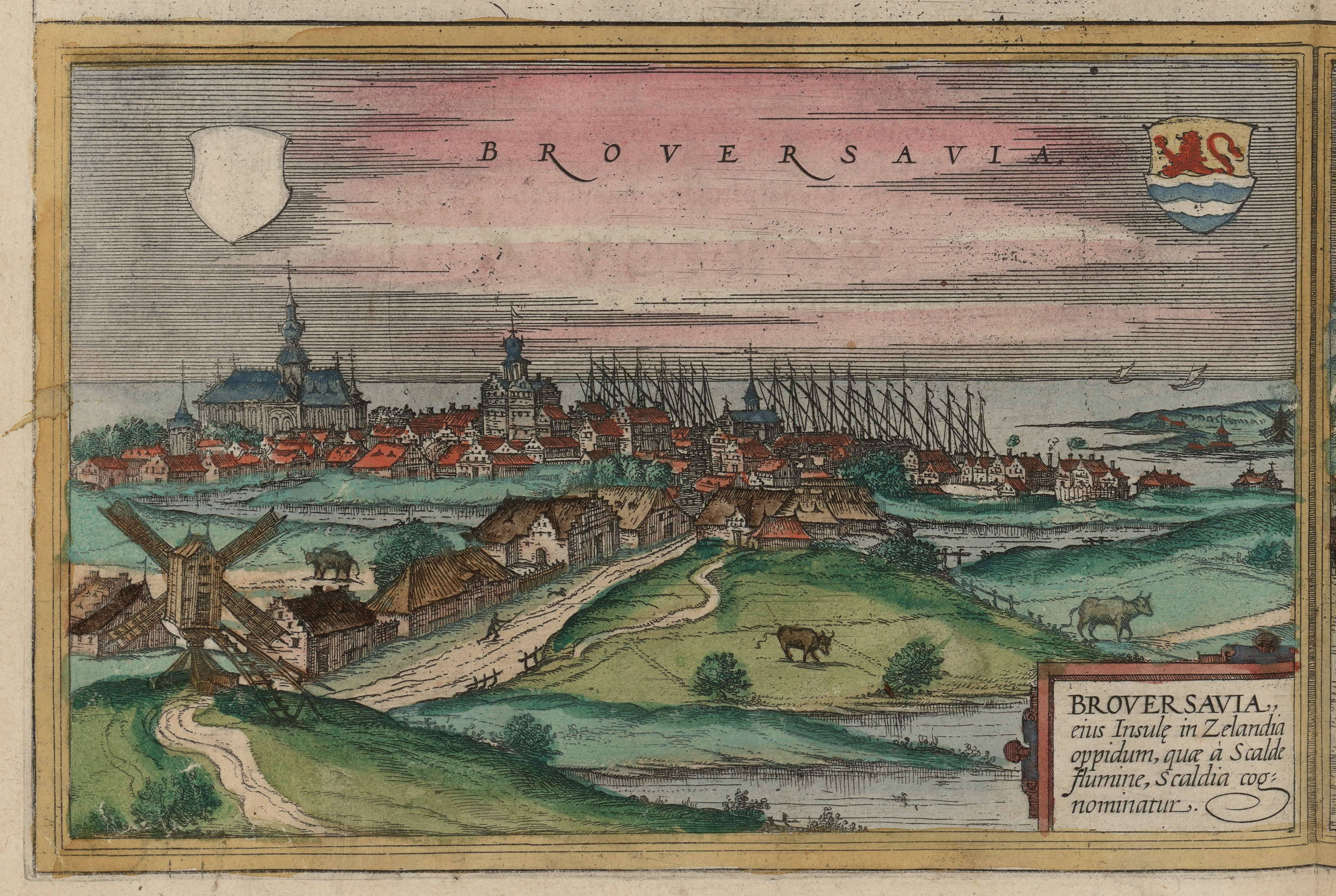
Brouwershaven in the Civitates orbis terrarum, 1572

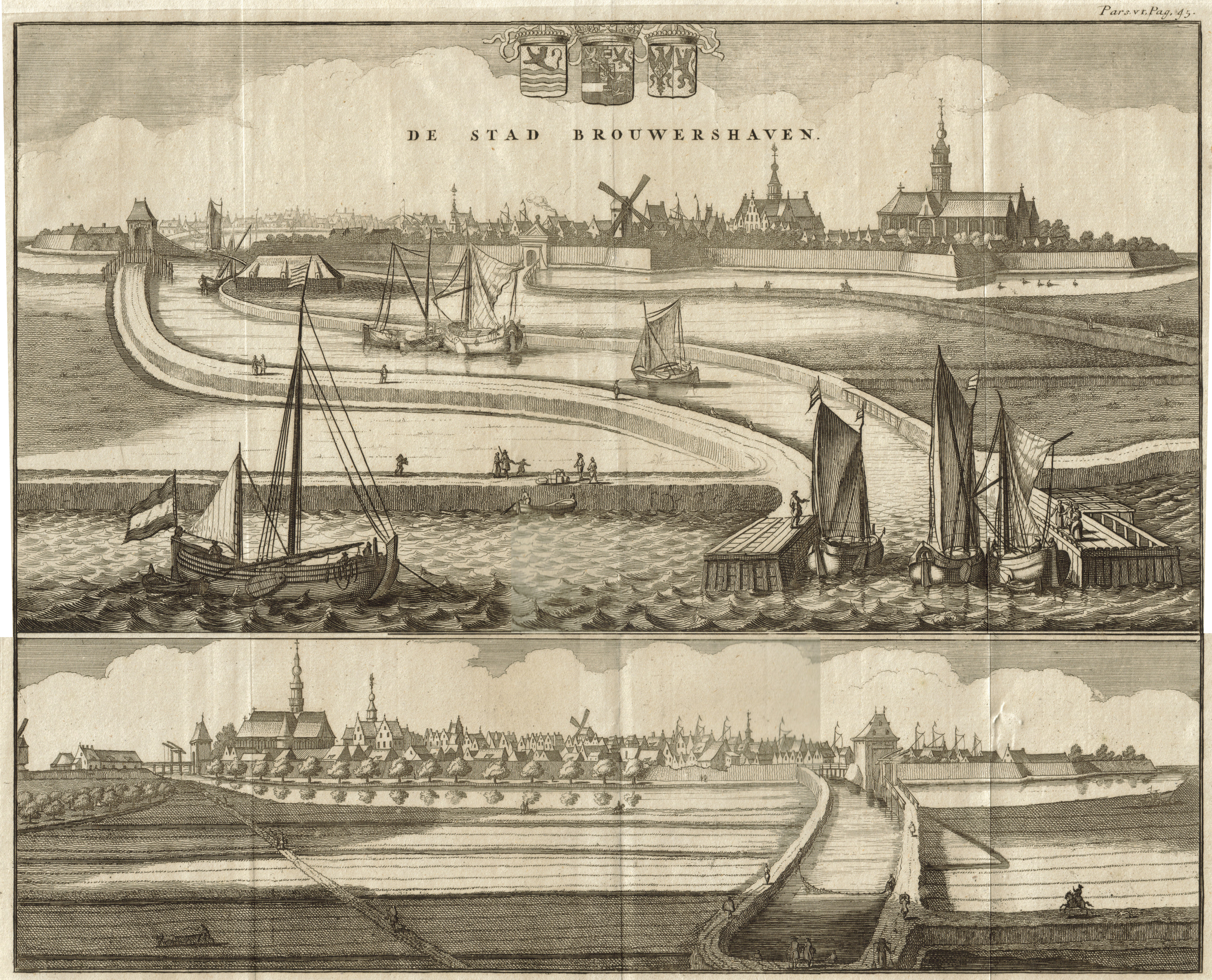
Brouwershaven 1696

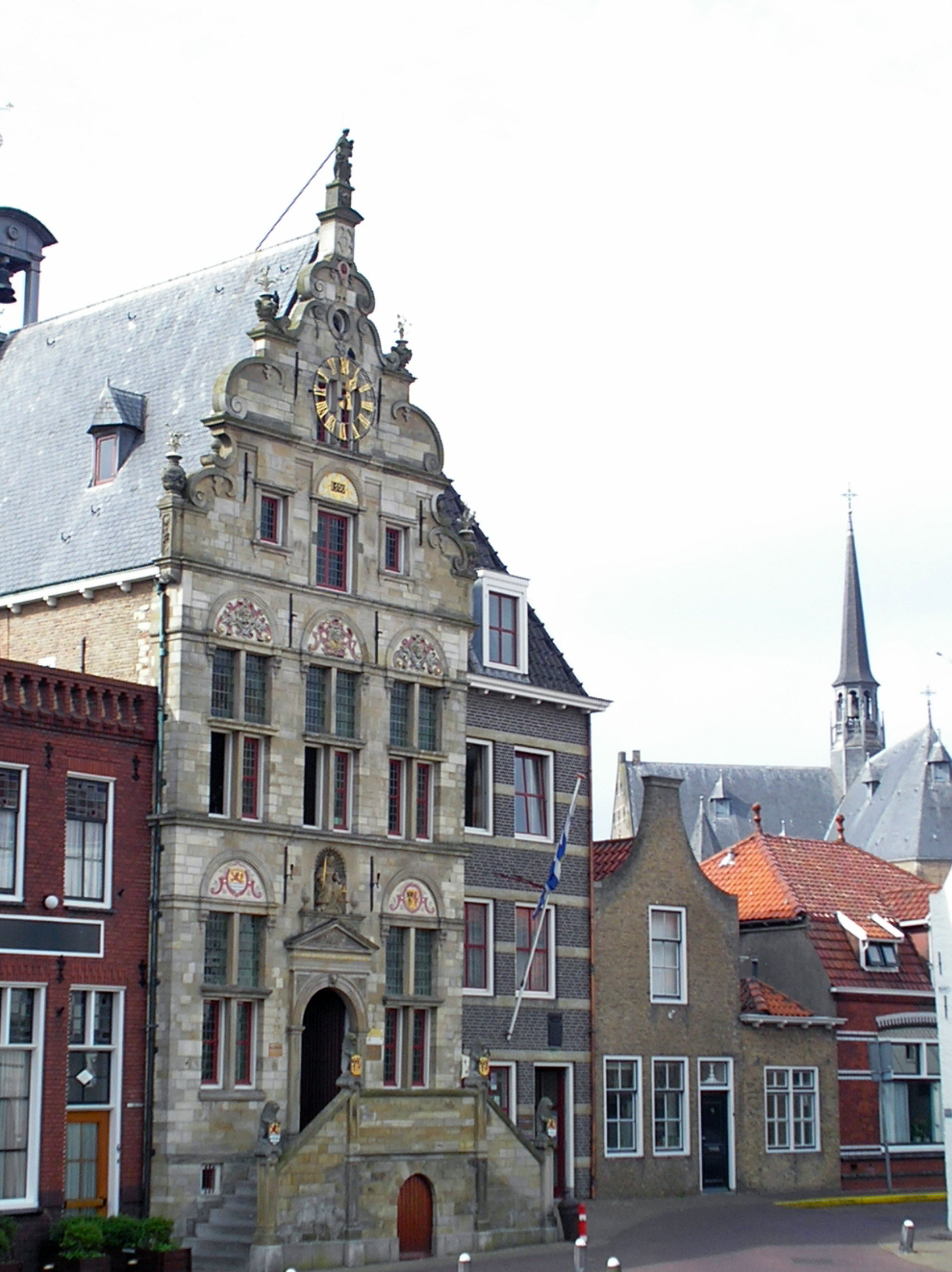
City hall of Brouwershaven

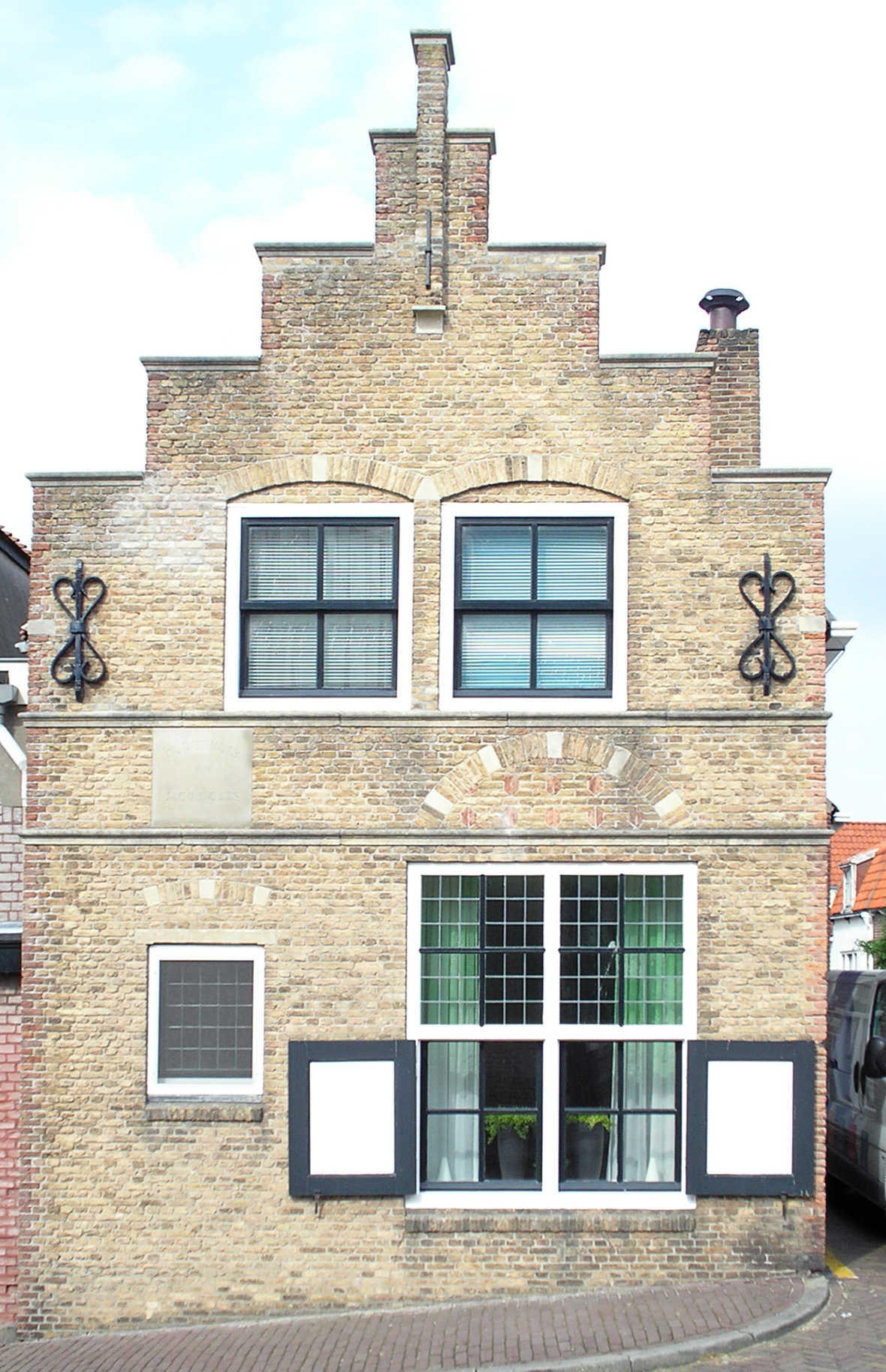
Birthplace of Jacob Cats
