= Brijdorpe =

- Hamlet
- Coat of arms

- Location in the province of Zeeland in the Netherlands Brijdorpe (Netherlands)
- Coordinates: 51°43′N 3°53′E
- Country: Netherlands
- Province: Zeeland
- Municipality: Schouwen-Duiveland
- Time zone: UTC+1 (CET)
  - Summer (DST): UTC+2 (CEST)
- Postal code: 4322
- Dialing code: 0111

Brijdorpe is a hamlet in the Dutch province of Zeeland. It is a part of the municipality of Schouwen-Duiveland, and lies about 23 km southwest of Hellevoetsluis.

Brijdorpe is not a statistical entity, and the postal authorities have placed it under Scharendijke. It has place name signs. Brijdorpe was home to 79 people in 1840. Nowadays, it consists of about 20 houses.

It used to be a separate municipality for a while, before it was made part of the municipality of Duivendijke in 1813.
