= Duivendijke =

Former municipality in Zeeland, the Netherlands

Coordinates: 51°42′51″N 3°54′0″E

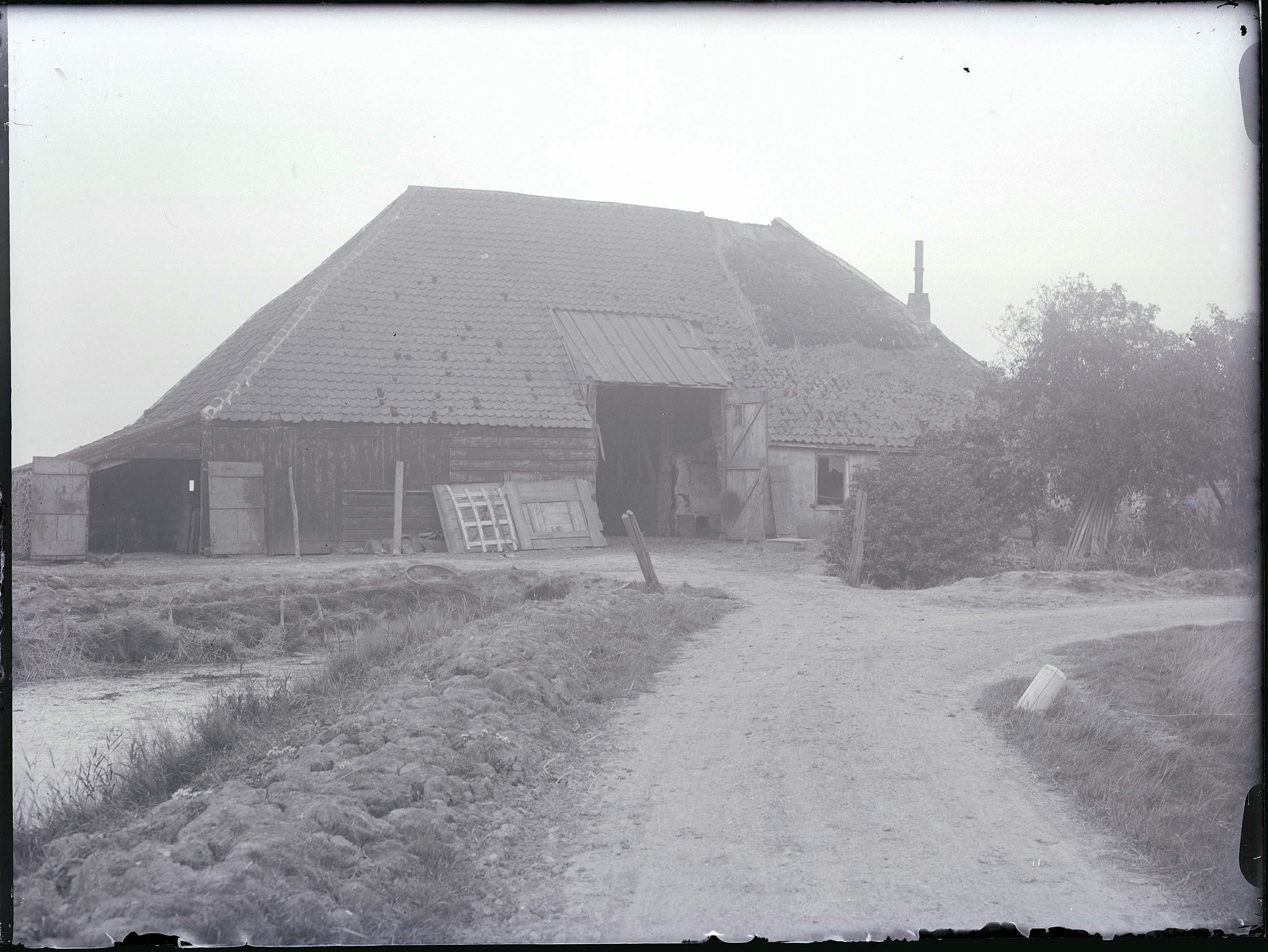

Duivendijke is a former village in the Dutch province of Zeeland. It was located about 2 km southwest of Brouwershaven on the island of Schouwen-Duiveland.

The village had a church, which was demolished before the middle of the 18th century. The first bishop of Leeuwarden, Cunerus Petri, was born in Duivendijke around 1530.

Until 1961, Duivendijke was the name of a separate municipality, that also covered the hamlets Klaaskinderenkerke, Brijdorpe and Looperskapelle.
