= Looperskapelle =

- Hamlet
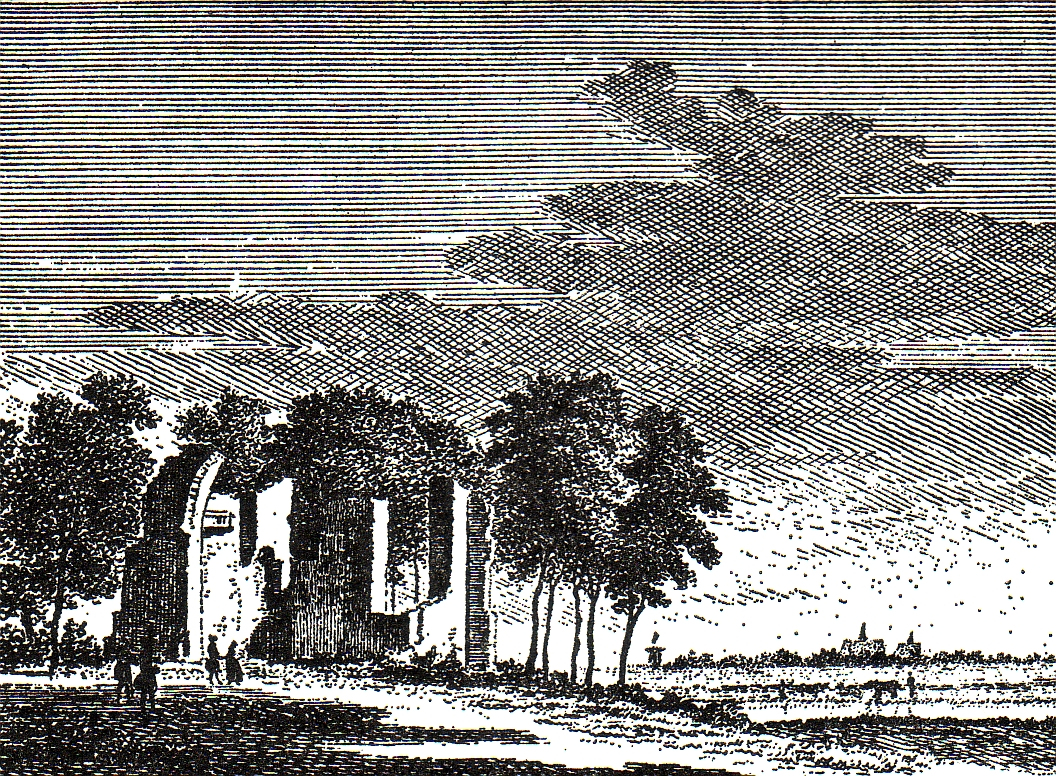
- Looperskapelle (1745)

- Coat of arms

- Location in the province of Zeeland in the Netherlands Looperskapelle (Netherlands)
- Coordinates: 51.72667°N 3.86324°E
- Country: Netherlands
- Province: Zeeland
- Municipality: Schouwen-Duiveland
- Time zone: UTC+1 (CET)
  - Summer (DST): UTC+2 (CEST)
- Postal code: 4322
- Dialing code: 0111

Looperskapelle is a hamlet in the Dutch province of Zeeland. It is a part of the municipality of Schouwen-Duiveland, and lies about 23 km southwest of Hellevoetsluis.

Looperskapelle is not a statistical entity, and the postal authorities have placed it under Scharendijke. Looperskapelle used to be home to 156 people in 1840. Nowadays, it consists of a handful of houses. It used to have a church, but it was demolished in 1590.

Looperskapelle was a separate municipality until 1813, when it was merged with Duivendijke.
