= Wolphaartsdijk =

- Village
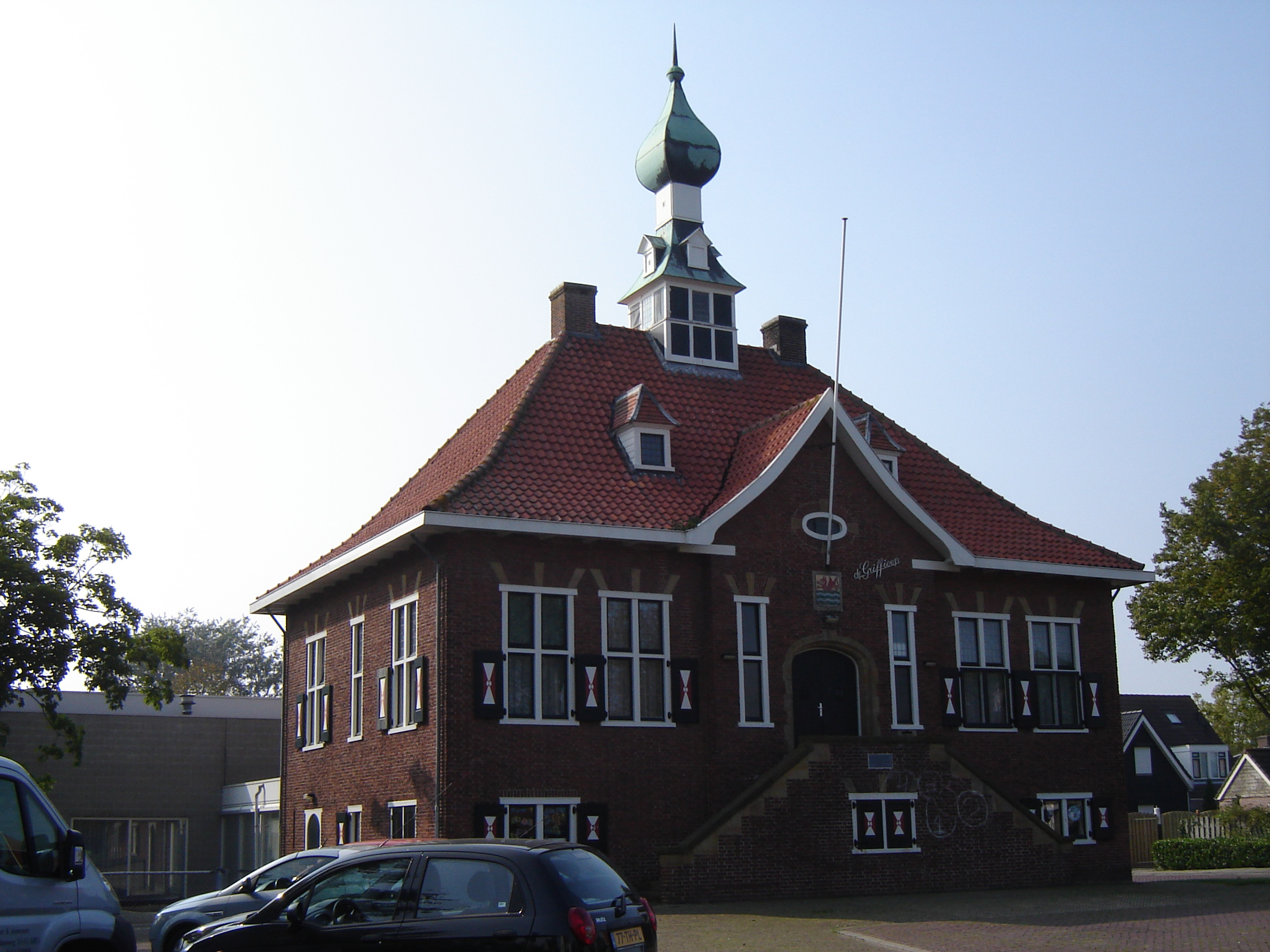
- De Griffioen, the former town hall of Wolphaartsdijk

- Flag Coat of arms

- Location in the province of Zeeland in the Netherlands Wolphaartsdijk (Netherlands)
- Coordinates: 51°31′47″N 3°49′11″E
- Country: Netherlands
- Province: Zeeland
- Municipality: Goes

Area
  - Total: 35.36 km^{2} (13.65 sq mi)
- Elevation: 3.1 m (10 ft)

Population (2021)
  - Total: 1,970
  - Density: 55.7/km^{2} (144/sq mi)
- Time zone: UTC+1 (CET)
  - Summer (DST): UTC+2 (CEST)
- Postal code: 4471
- Dialing code: 0113

Wolphaartsdijk is a village in the Netherlands, located in the province Zeeland. Wolphaartsdijk is part of the municipality of Goes. In 2009 the village had 2109 inhabitants.

== History ==
During the Middle Ages, Wolphaartsdijk, Oud-Sabbinge and Westkerke were located on the island Wolphaartsdijk. Due to floods on November 25, 1377, a large part of Westkerke was lost.

The churches of Wolphaartsdijk and Oud-Sabbinge were destroyed by the Geuzen and Spanish forces in the 16th century.

In 1809 the Wilhelminapolder was created, joining Wolphaartsdijk with Zuid-Beveland.

During the beginning of the 1860s, a decision was made to build a new church since the old church was showing defects.

The church, named "Nicolauskerk" (Church of Saint Nicholas) was finished in 1862.

The North Sea flood of 1953 affected large areas of Wolphaartsdijk, killing 14 people.

On 1 January 1970, the municipality of Wolphaartsdijk was terminated. From this moment, Wolphaartsdijk was part of the municipality of Goes.

== Tourism ==
Wolphaartsdijk is a popular destination amongst tourists. Many tourists enjoy the water sport possibilities at the north situated lake "Veerse Meer". Around Wolphaartsdijk there are multiple campsites and many horeca establishments. Several areas around the village are protected nature monuments such as the "Middelplaten". Here multiple birds are brooding such as the shorebird, cormorant and the Eurasian spoonbill.

=== Sights ===
The hamlet Oud-Sabbinge less than 1 km west of Wolphaartsdijk, has Sabbinge Castle.

== Sports ==
The village has several sport clubs, some of which play in minor competitions. The following sports are performed:

- Football
- Tennis
- Table tennis
- Horse riding

== Gallery ==
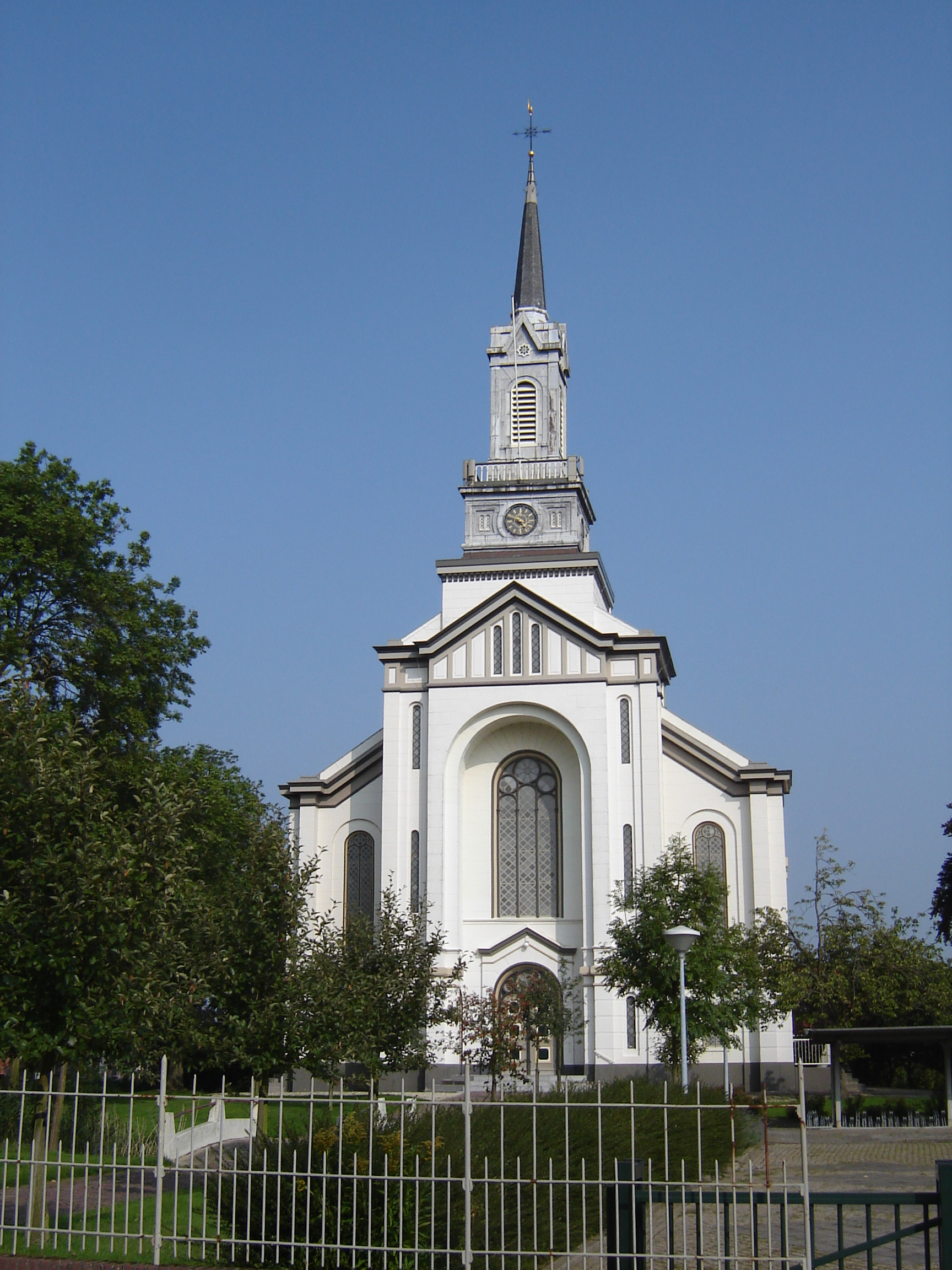
The Nicolauskerk

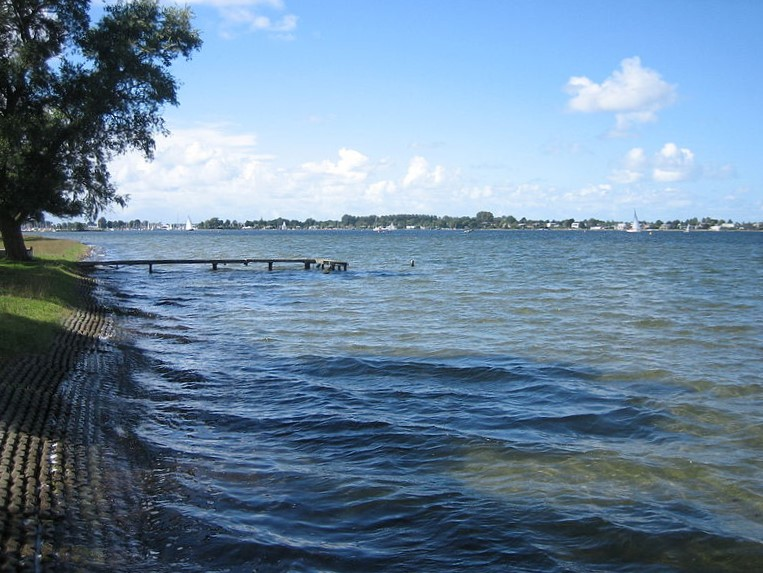
The lake, "Veerse Meer"

The marina
