= Scharendijke =

- Village
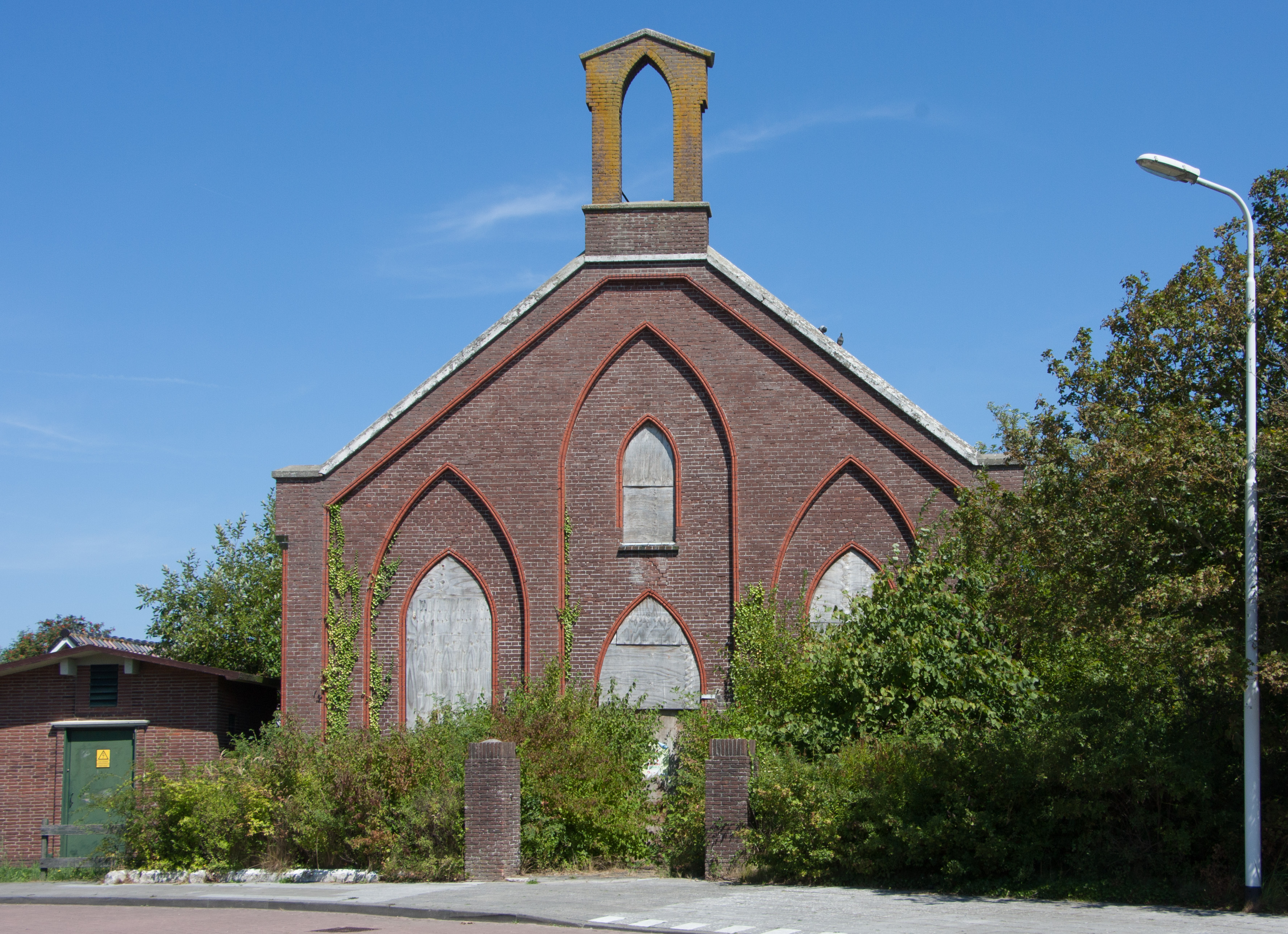
- Former church of Scharendijke

- Flag

- Location in the province of Zeeland in the Netherlands Scharendijke (Netherlands)
- Coordinates: 51°44′5″N 3°50′41″E
- Country: Netherlands
- Province: Zeeland
- Municipality: Schouwen-Duiveland

Area
  - Total: 14.07 km^{2} (5.43 sq mi)
- Elevation: 0.2 m (0.66 ft)

Population (2021)
  - Total: 1,260
  - Density: 89.6/km^{2} (232/sq mi)
- Time zone: UTC+1 (CET)
  - Summer (DST): UTC+2 (CEST)
- Postal code: 4322
- Dialing code: 0111

Scharendijke is a village in the Dutch province of Zeeland. It is a part of the municipality of Schouwen-Duiveland, and lies about 24 km west of Hellevoetsluis.

The village was first mentioned in 1487 as Schaerdendijke, and is a combination of dike and trench. Scharendijke is a dike village. It was originally a little hamlet. Between 1901 and 1902, a harbour was built and it developed into a little village around the harbour.

Scharendijke was home to 204 people in 1840. Part of the village was rebuilt after the North Sea flood of 1953. From the 1970s onwards, holiday homes were built around the village.

Scharendijke used to be part of the municipality of Elkerzee. In 1960, the municipality of Middenschouwen was created and Scharendijk became its capital. In 1997, it was merged into Schouwen-Duiveland.

== Gallery ==
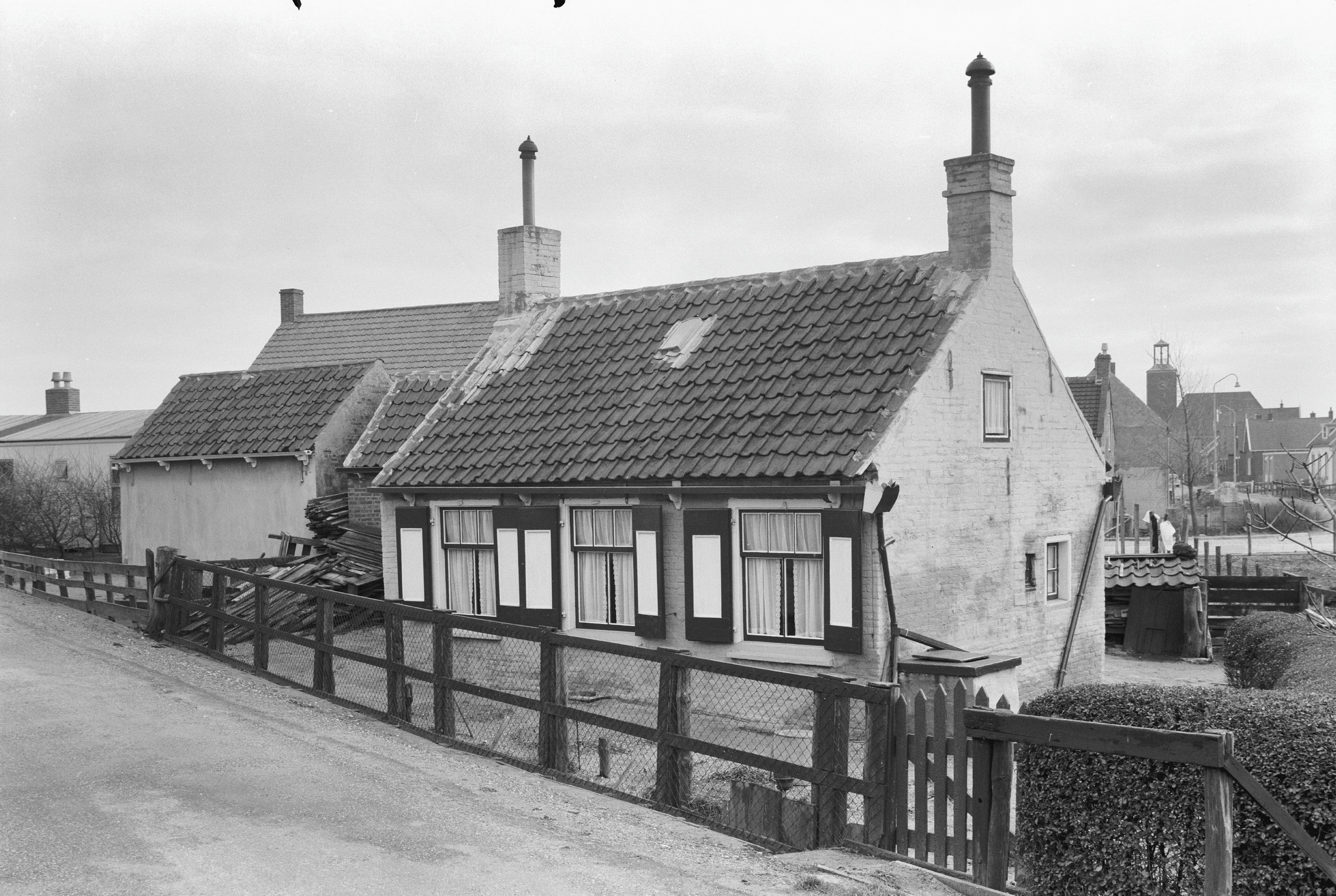
House on the dike

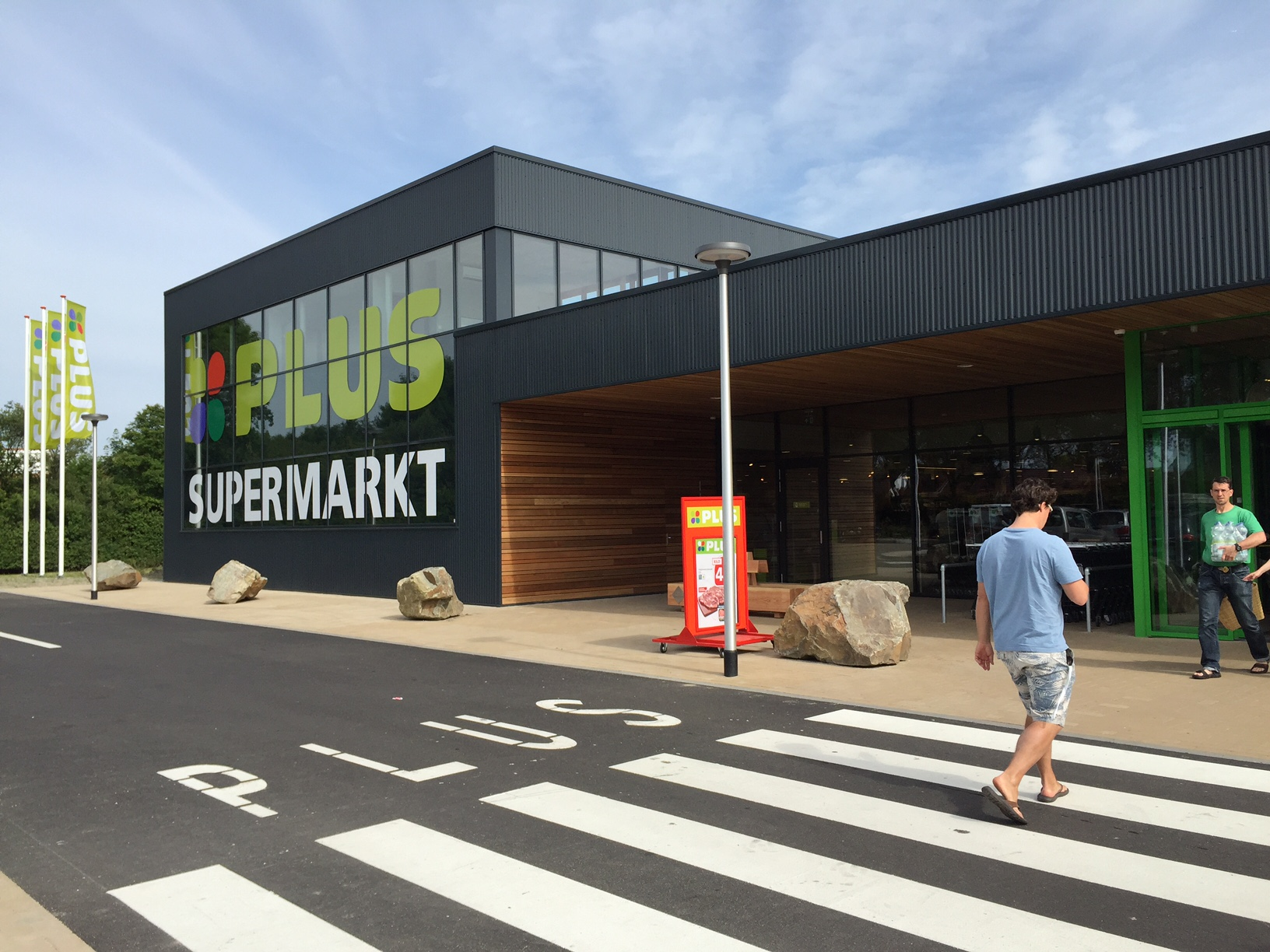
Supermarket
