= HNLMS Hydrograaf =

HNLMS Hydrograaf is the name of the following ships of the Royal Netherlands Navy:

- HNLMS Hydrograaf (1873)
- HNLMS Hydrograaf (1910)
- HNLMS Hydrograaf (2021)
