= HNLMS Pelikaan =

At least three ships of the Royal Netherlands Navy have been named HNLMS Pelikaan after the Dutch word for Pelecanidae:

- HNLMS Pelikaan (A830), formerly HMS Thruster (F131), was a logistic support vessel of the Royal Netherlands Navy, served from 1947 to 1973
- HNLMS Pelikaan (A801), was a logistic support vessel of the Royal Netherlands Navy, served from 1990 to 2006.
- HNLMS Pelikaan (A804), is a logistic support vessel of the Royal Netherlands Navy, entered service in 2006.
