= HNLMS Eilerts de Haan =

Royal Netherlands Navy Auxiliary

History

Netherlands
- Name: Eilerts de Haan
- Namesake: Johan Eilerts de Haan
- Builder: Maatschappij voor Scheeps- en Werktuigbouw Fijenoord, Rotterdam
- Launched: 1921
- Commissioned: 25 April 1921
- Out of service: 14 May 1941
- Renamed: Randzel in Kriegsmarine service
- Fate: Ran aground in the Baltic Sea

General characteristics
- Type: Auxiliary, hydrographic survey ship
- Displacement: 312 t (307 long tons) standard
- Length: 44.9 m (147 ft 4 in)
- Beam: 6.6 m (21 ft 8 in)
- Draught: 2.2 m (7 ft 3 in)
- Installed power: 600 hp (450 kW)
- Propulsion: 2 × Werkspoor triple expansion engine powering 2 screws
- Speed: 12 knots (22 km/h; 14 mph)
- Complement: 25

HNLMS Eilerts de Haan was a hydrographic survey vessel created for service with the Royal Netherlands Navy in waters of the Netherlands. The ship was named after Johan Eilerts de Haan, a famous Dutch naval commander that died during the exploration of Surinam, known for his achievements during earlier explorations.

The ship was a more modern sister ship of HNLMS Hydrograaf.

== Service history ==
HNLMS Eilerts de Haan served as a hydrographic survey vessel with the Royal Netherlands Navy from the time of its commissioning until 1939 when it was temporarily taken out of service to undergo maintenance. Eilerts de Haan was still be in drydock at the time of the German invasion of the Netherlands, allowing the ship to be captured undamaged. It was then be pressed into Kriegsmarine service as the training ship Randzel.

Randzel served in this role until running aground in early 1945 near the German island of Fehmarn and sinking.
