= Schelde-class tugboat =

Class of Netherlands tugboats

Class overview
- Name: Schelde class
- Builders: Delta Shipyard, Sliedrecht
- Operators: Royal Netherlands Navy
- Succeeded by: Bolder class
- Built: 1985–1987
- In commission: 1986–present
- Planned: 5
- Completed: 5
- Active: 5

General characteristics
- Type: Harbour tugboat
- Length: 10.8 m (35 ft 5 in)
- Beam: 3.8 m (12 ft 6 in)
- Draught: 1.6 m (5 ft 3 in)
- Propulsion: 1 propeller; 115 hp (86 kW); DAF diesel engine
- Speed: 10 knots (19 km/h; 12 mph) (maximum)
- Crew: 3

The Schelde class are a class of tugboats used by the Royal Netherlands Navy, primarily to move around large fenders and small sloops at the Nieuwe Haven Naval Base.

== Ships in class ==
Schelde class construction data
Hull number	Name	Builder	Commissioned	Status	Notes
Y8055	Schelde	Delta Shipyard, Sliedrecht	1 December 1989	In active service	
Y8056	Wierbalg	Delta Shipyard, Sliedrecht	18 February 1987	In active service	
Y8057	Malzwin	Delta Shipyard, Sliedrecht	24 December 1986	In active service	
Y8058	Zuidwal	Delta Shipyard, Sliedrecht	1 December 1986	In active service	
Y8059	Westwal	Delta Shipyard, Sliedrecht	29 December 1986	Donated to M.W.V	Donated to Marine Watersport Vereniging in early 2024

== Replacement ==
The five ships from the Schelde class are set to be replaced by three new vessels which are going to be built by Stormer Marine in Hoorn. These new ships will be delivered in 2023 and 2024.
