= Noorderhaaks-class patrol vessel =

Class of harbour patrol boats used by the Royal Netherlands Navy

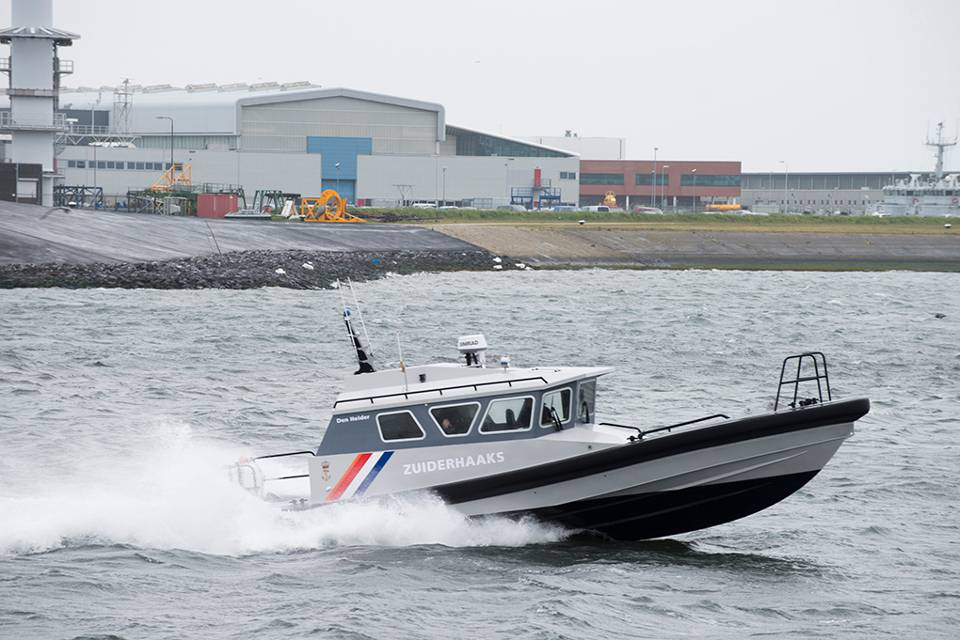
- Zuiderhaaks

Class overview
- Name: Noorderhaaks class
- Builders: Jongert, Wieringerwerf
- Operators: Royal Netherlands Navy
- In service: 2015–present
- Planned: 2
- Completed: 2
- Active: 2

General characteristics
- Type: Harbour patrol boat
- Displacement: 8.64 t (8.50 long tons)
- Length: 12.60 m (41 ft 4 in)
- Beam: 4 m (13 ft 1 in)
- Draught: 0.73 m (2 ft 5 in)
- Propulsion: 2 × 450 hp (340 kW) Volvo Penta diesel engines
- Speed: 26 knots (48 km/h; 30 mph)
- Crew: 2

The Noorderhaaks class are a pair of harbour patrol boats used by the Royal Netherlands Navy primarily to patrol the Nieuwe Haven Naval Base and its surroundings. They were built by Jongert and put into service on 2 June 2015.

== Ships in class ==
Noorderhaaks-class construction data
Hull number	Name	Builder	Commissioned	Status	Notes
Y8208	Noorderhaaks	Jongert, Wieringerwerf	2 June 2015	In active service	
Y8209	Zuiderhaaks	Jongert, Wieringerwerf	2 June 2015	In active service	
