= List of yachts built by Jongert =

This is a list of some yachts built by Jongert, sorted by year.

Was the longest yacht upon completion.

== 1975–1994 ==
Year	Length overall in meters	Name	Reference
1975	20.5	Anais	
1983	28.35	Sea Shuttle	
1984	23,9 (LOH)/ 28,5 (LOA)	ADMIRAL BELLINGSHAUSEN ex-ANTILLA, ex-CRYSTAL SHIP, ex-ANNABELLE, ex-BRAMANTE, ex-ST JEAN II	
1985	28.6	Jade S	
1985	22.07	Inspiration	
1986	36.42	Tamer II	
1986	38.4	Gloria	
1989	30.02	La Parla	
1990	33.4	Lady Sunshine	
1990	21.1	Evening Start	
1991	30.4	Antares Avance	
1991	29.45	Spirit of Bowfish	
1991	29.45	Alta Marea	
1991	21.11	Blue Reflection	
1992	28.8	Hide N Sea	
1993	30	Sailing T	
1993	29.73	Celandine	
1994	33.66	Fidelitas	

== 1995–2004 ==
Year	Length overall in meters	Name	Reference
1995	30	Impression	
1995	29.77	Scarena	
1996	30	Solaia	
1997	31.7	Audrey II	
1998	29.26	Azzura	
1998	30	Black Molly III	
1999	41.55	Southwind Of	
2000	31.6	Anamcara	
2000	34.43	Piaffe 2	
2000	41.2	Anna Christina	
2000	42	Passe Partout	
2002	41.6	Islandia	
2002	32.5	Sunleigh	
2003	46.1	Wellenreiter	
2003	26.7	Sea Rose Star	
2004	41.55	Infatuation	
2004	29.1	Mbolo	

== 2005–2015 ==
Year	Length overall in meters	Name	Reference
2005	31	Alme Sol	
2005	29.1	Scorpione dei Mari	
2006	24.32	Charisma Nova	
2007	26.7	Ithaka	
2007	26.76	Icarus	
2010	24.4	Uisge Beatha	
2010	39	Lucia-M	
2013	18	Tommy	

== Under construction ==
Planned delivery	Length overall in meters	Name	Reference
2015 (on hold)	34	Jongert 34M	
TBD (on hold)	32	Jongert 3200P	
2019	47	Project Revolution	

== See also ==
- List of large sailing yachts
- List of motor yachts by length
- Luxury yacht
- Jongert
