= DSS Galatea =

Royal Netherlands Navy patrol ship

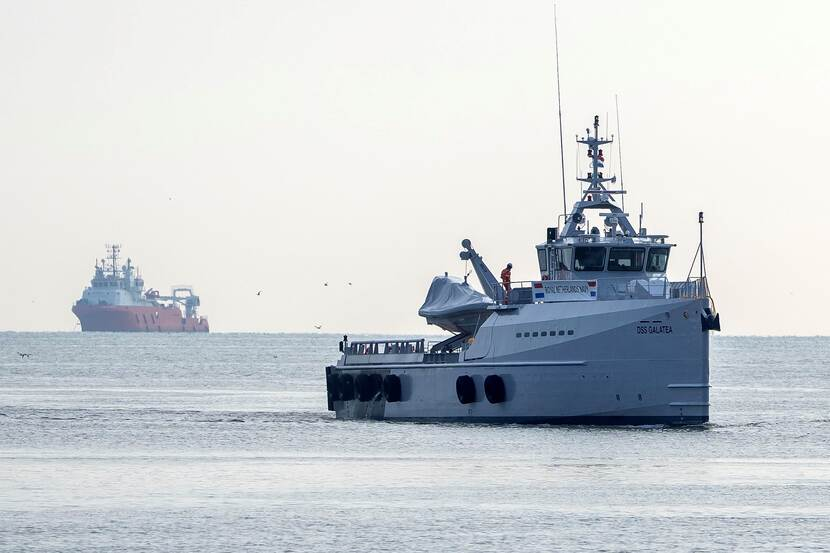
- DSS Galatea

History

Netherlands
- Name: Galatea
- Builder: Damen Group
- Launched: 2010
- In service: 2025–present
- Home port: Den Helder
- Identification: IMO number: 9575400; MMSI number: 246404000; Callsign: PDJE
- Status: In active service

General characteristics
- Type: Patrol vessel
- Tonnage: 427 GT
- Length: 50.25 m (164 ft 10 in)
- Beam: 9.35 m (30 ft 8 in)
- Crew: 9

DSS Galatea is a patrol vessel of the Royal Netherlands Navy (RNLN). She is temporarily leased from Damen by the Dutch Ministry of Defence and will be used until the Multifunctional Support Ships enter service in 2027. While the ship is used by the RNLN it is not formally part of the Dutch fleet, instead Galatea is classified as state ship (Dutch: Staatsschip) rather than naval ship. She will be manned by civilians from the Dutch company Fugro.

== Design and construction ==
The design of the Galatea is based on the Damen Fast Crew Supplier 5009. She has a length of 50 meters and can be equipped with unmanned aerial vehicles and unmanned underwater vehicles.

Galatea was built in 2010 by Damen in Vietnam. The lease of the ship is funded by the North Sea Infrastructure Protection Programme (PBNI) of the Ministry of Infrastructure and Water Management.

== Service history ==
During the 2025 NATO Summit in The Hague Galatea patrolled the North Sea near the Dutch coast.

In January 2026 it was reported that Galatea was escorting Russian ships, which included General Skobolev and Boiky, while they were in Dutch waters.

In July 2026 it was reported that Galatea took part in an exercise to demonstrate and test uncrewed systems in the North Sea. During these maritime uncrewed sea trials Galatea was deployed as an at-sea C2 centre.

In August 2026 several companies worked on the Galatea while it was moored at a quay behind the Moormanbrug.
