= HNLMS Pelikaan (A801) =

Logistic support vessel

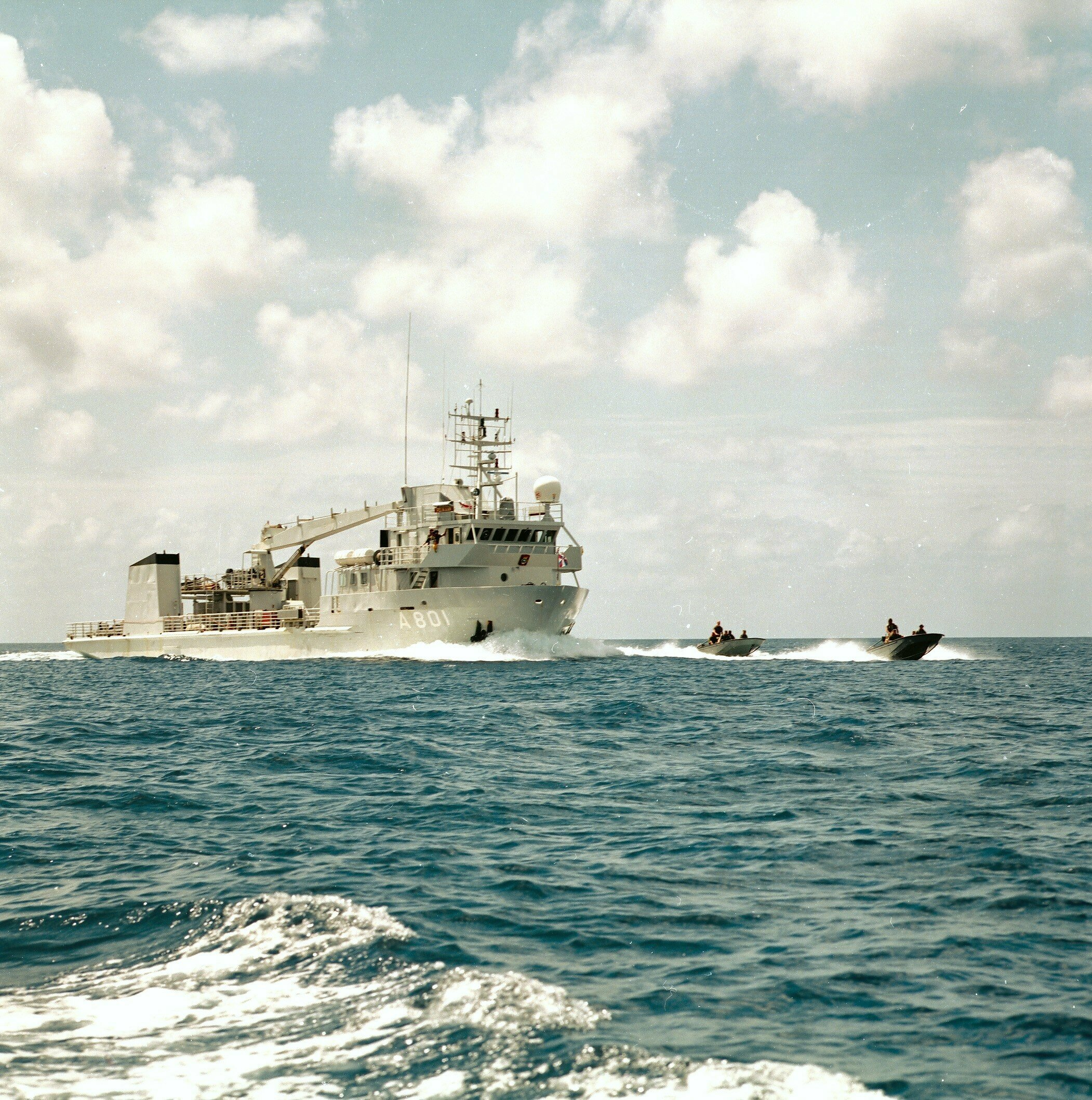
- HNLMS Pelikaan

Class overview
- Builders: Vindholmen Offshore A/S, Arendal
- Operators: Royal Netherlands Navy
- Preceded by: Woerden
- Succeeded by: Pelikaan
- In service: 1984-2005
- In commission: 1990-2005

History

Norway
- Name: Kilindoni
- Completed: 1984
- Out of service: May 1990
- Identification: IMO number: 8321137
- Fate: Sold to the Royal Netherlands Navy

Netherlands
- Name: Pelikaan
- Operator: Royal Netherlands Navy
- Acquired: May 1990
- Commissioned: 9 October 1990
- Decommissioned: 9 December 2005
- Home port: Parera Naval Base
- Identification: Pennant number: A801
- Status: Laid up
- Badge

General characteristics
- Type: Logistic support vessel
- Displacement: 505 t (497 long tons) full load
- Length: 46.23 m (151 ft 8 in)
- Beam: 10.61 m (34 ft 10 in)
- Draught: 2.48 m (8 ft 2 in)
- Propulsion: 2× 1,100 hp (820 kW) Caterpillar diesel engines
- Speed: 11 knots (20 km/h; 13 mph)
- Troops: 40
- Complement: 13
- Armament: 1× 12.7 mm (0.50 in) machine gun

HNLMS Pelikaan (A801) was a logistic support vessel (Note: In Dutch the ship was classified as "Communicatievaartuig NA", with NA standing for Netherlands Antilles.) of the Royal Netherlands Navy. She was stationed in the Netherlands Antilles.

== History ==
The ship was built around 1984 at the shipyard Vindholmen Offshore A/S in Arendal, Norway. While originally built for a Norwegian owner, the ship was bought in 1990 by the Royal Netherlands Navy for the purpose of serving as a logistic support vessel for the Netherlands Antilles. After a two-month journey, the ship arrived in Curaçao on 1 September 1990. After her arrival the ship was made ready for its new role as a logistic support vessel at the Curaçaose Dokmaatschappij. She was commissioned a month later on 9 October 1990. In 2005 Pelikaan was decommissioned and replaced a year later by a new ship with the same name.

== Service history ==
Between 1986 and 1990 the ship was used for coastal shipping in Tanzania.

=== Royal Netherlands Navy ===
In 1994 Pelikaan acted as communication ship during a jungle training exercise of the Netherlands Marine Corps.
