= Point-class sealift ship =

Class of six roll-on/roll-off sealift ships

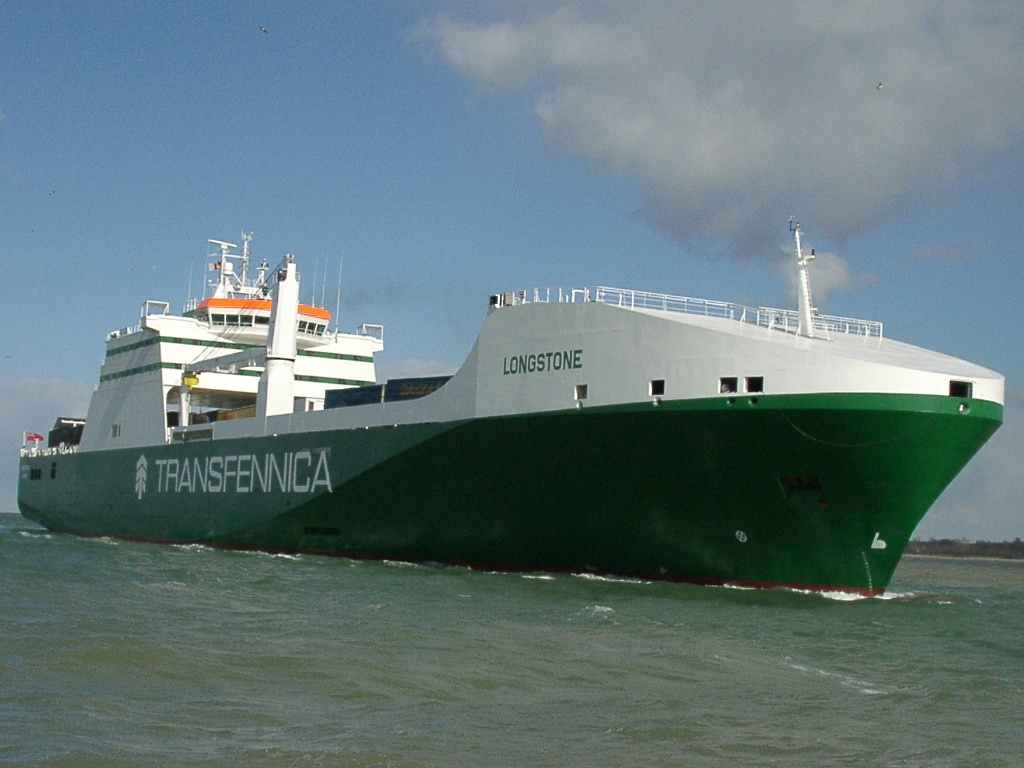
- MV Longstone

Class overview
- Name: Point class
- Builders: Flensburger Schiffbau (4 ships); Harland & Wolff, Belfast (2 ships)
- Operators: Foreland Shipping Ltd (formerly AWSR Ltd)
- In service: 2002–present
- Completed: 6
- Active: 4 under contract with the MoD

General characteristics
- Type: Roll-on/roll-off
- Tonnage: 14,200 DWT
- Displacement: 23,000 tonnes full load
- Length: 193.0 m (633 ft 2 in)
- Beam: 26.0 m (85 ft 4 in)
- Draught: 7.6 m (24 ft 11 in)
- Propulsion: 2 × MaK 94M43 diesel engines; 21,700 hp (16,182 kW); 2 propellers; Bow thruster
- Speed: 21.5 kn (39.8 km/h; 24.7 mph)
- Range: 17,000 km (9,200 nmi)
- Capacity: 2,650 linear metres of space for vehicles; 130 armoured vehicles and 60 trucks and ammunition or 8,000 tonnes of vehicles
- Crew: 18–22
- Sensors & processing systems: I-band navigation radar
- Aviation facilities: Can carry up to four helicopters including Chinook, Apache, Merlin and Wildcat.
- Notes: Sourced from Jane's Fighting Ships 2008–2009, p. 876

The Point class is a class of six roll-on/roll-off sealift ships originally procured under a Private Finance Initiative to be available for use as naval auxiliaries to the British armed forces. Two of the ships have now been released from the contract, leaving four available for service with the military.

== Background ==
The Point-class sealift ships are the result of the 1998 Strategic Defence Review and are designed by Houlder Ltd for the strategic transport of military cargoes and vehicles in times of need. The UK Ministry of Defence (MoD) has purchased a 22-year charter from Foreland Shipping (previously named AWSR Shipping), who own, operate and crew the ships, utilising them as merchant vessels when they are not required for military service. The small British crews are provided by Foreland Shipping and are required to be sponsored reserves as a condition of service, which means they can be called up to become part of the Armed Forces if needed. The benefits of this is that it guarantees crews in times of crisis, it means crew members can be expected to work under the Armed Forces Act 2006 rather than the Merchant Navy Code of Conduct, and that they would be classed as combatants and be afforded the rights granted under the Geneva Convention.

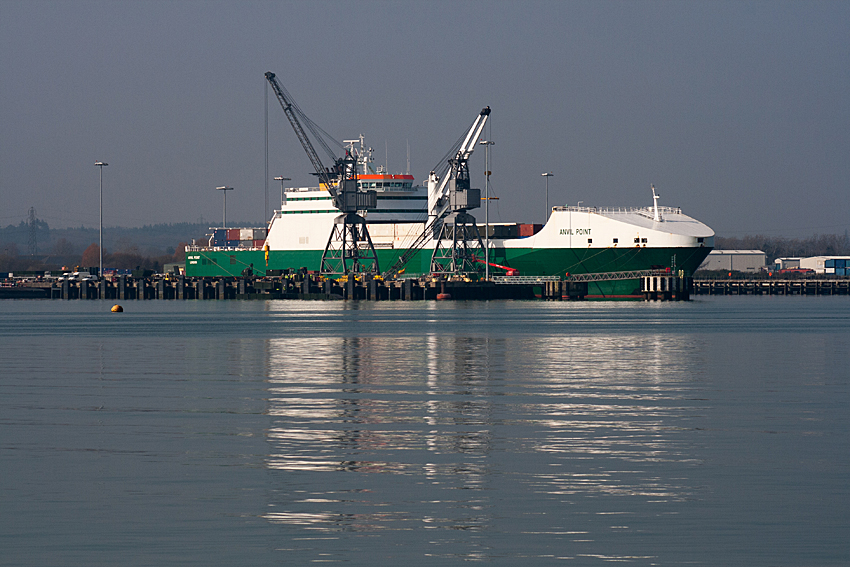
Anvil Point at Marchwood Military Port

Four ships were built by the German company Flensburger Schiffbau-Gesellschaft, the balance being built by Harland and Wolff in Belfast. All are named for British points and headlands. They replaced the Royal Fleet Auxiliaries Sea Centurion and Sea Crusader in service. Anvil Point was the last ship built by the Harland and Wolff yard.

Of the six ships, MV Longstone and Beachy Head were on charter to the civilian company Transfennica operating a RoRo cargo ferry service in the Baltic Sea, connecting Hanko in Finland and Lübeck in Germany. Most recently they have been operating on the Immingham to Cuxhaven route for DFDS. Other ships have also been involved in commercial activity with other companies and other militaries. All ships are available to the MoD at very short notice if required. The first four ships have been kept almost constantly busy on MoD duties since the build-up to the Iraq invasion in 2003, but MV Longstone and Beachy Head have seen little MoD service and were sold in 2013 as a result of budget cuts.

Beachy Head now serves with the Republic of Singapore Navy as MV Mentor and is used for both training and sealift.

== Operational history ==
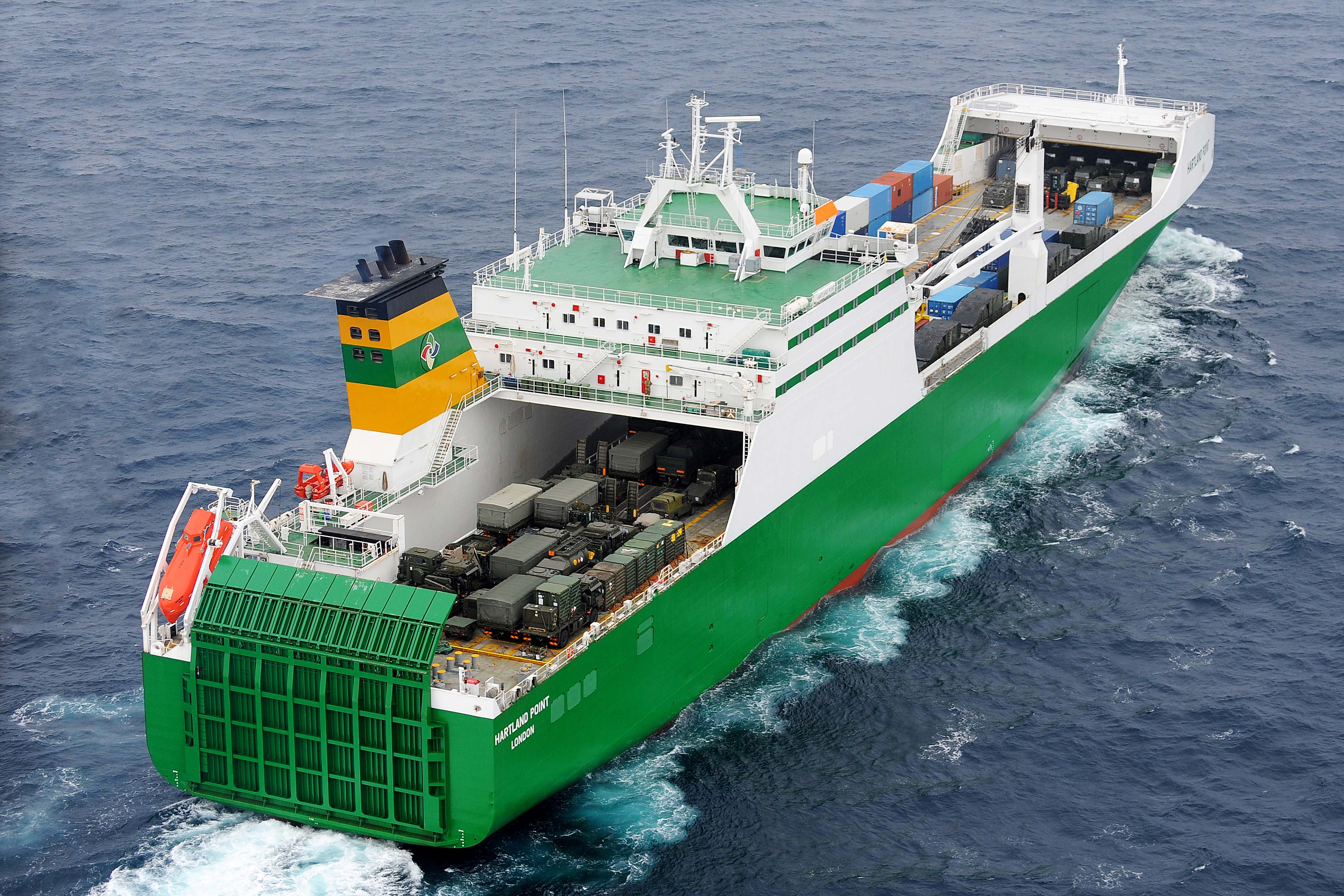
MV Hartland Point carrying military equipment during Cougar 12

MV Hartland Point was part of the COUGAR 12 deployment under the Commander Amphibious Task Group and also active in operations off the Cornish coast in 2012. MV Hurst Point made a port call at Gibraltar in August 2013 and was part of the next year's COUGAR 13 deployment. Hartland Point recently worked with the Royal Navy and French Navy on Operation Corsica Lion 2015. MV Hurst Point has been used to replenish the Falkland Islands garrison. A Point-class vessel was reported to call at the British military port in the islands (Mare Harbour) about once every six to eight weeks.

MV Mentor represented the Republic of Singapore Navy alongside RSS Supreme and RSS Vigilance at the SIMBEX 2025 while the Indian Navy was represented by INS Satpura. This was the 32nd edition of the military exercise and was hosted by Singapore between 28 July and 1 August 2025. The Republic of Singapore Air Force also participated with an S-70B Seahawk naval helicopter, two Fokker-50 maritime patrol aircraft and two F-15SG fighter aircraft. The harbour phase was held at RSS Singapura base and was followed by the sea phase held in the southern parts of South China Sea. During the sea phase, the participating forces carried out advanced warfare drills, including gunnery firings, air defence exercises, and maritime security operations. The sea phase concluded with a ceremonial sail-past by the participating ships.

== PFI status ==
According to a Defence Select Committee report released in 2007, "Four of the Ro-Ro ships are permanently contracted to the MoD with the other two at notice for MoD tasking. For the two ships at notice, one can be accessed in 20 days and the other in 30 days."

In the Autumn 2011, it was stated that the two ships at short notice would be released from the PFI, leaving four ships available for use by the MoD. The ships released were the MV Beachy Head and the MV Longstone, and the RMT union was informed that these vessels would be laid up or sold. As of 2023/24, the former Longstone had been renamed New Amsterdam and was sailing as a Netherlands-flagged vessel, while former Beachy Head (now renamed MV Mentor) was chartered by the Singapore Navy.

The contract for the Ministry of Defence to use the remaining vessels was originally scheduled to have expired at the end of 2024. In October 2021 the MoD issued a Request for Information (RFI) for an “interim” Strategic Sealift capability to begin in January 2025. In November 2022, Foreland Shipping was awarded an "interim" seven-year contract, valued at £625M, to continue the service until December 2031. This interim capability allows the MoD to continue with the current vessels until a longer-term replacement is found. Such plans, incorporating a potential expansion in capacity, were reportedly under consideration as of late 2026.

== Ships in the class ==
Name	Builder	Commissioned	Notes
MV Hurst Point	Flensburger Schiffbau	16 August 2002	
MV Hartland Point	Harland & Wolff, Belfast	11 December 2002	
MV Eddystone	Flensburger Schiffbau	28 November 2002	
MV Anvil Point	Harland & Wolff, Belfast	17 January 2003	
MV Longstone	Flensburger Schiffbau	24 April 2003	Renamed New Amsterdam. No longer available to the MoD
MV Beachy Head	Flensburger Schiffbau	17 April 2003	Renamed Mentor. Chartered to the Republic of Singapore Navy
