= Tamer II =

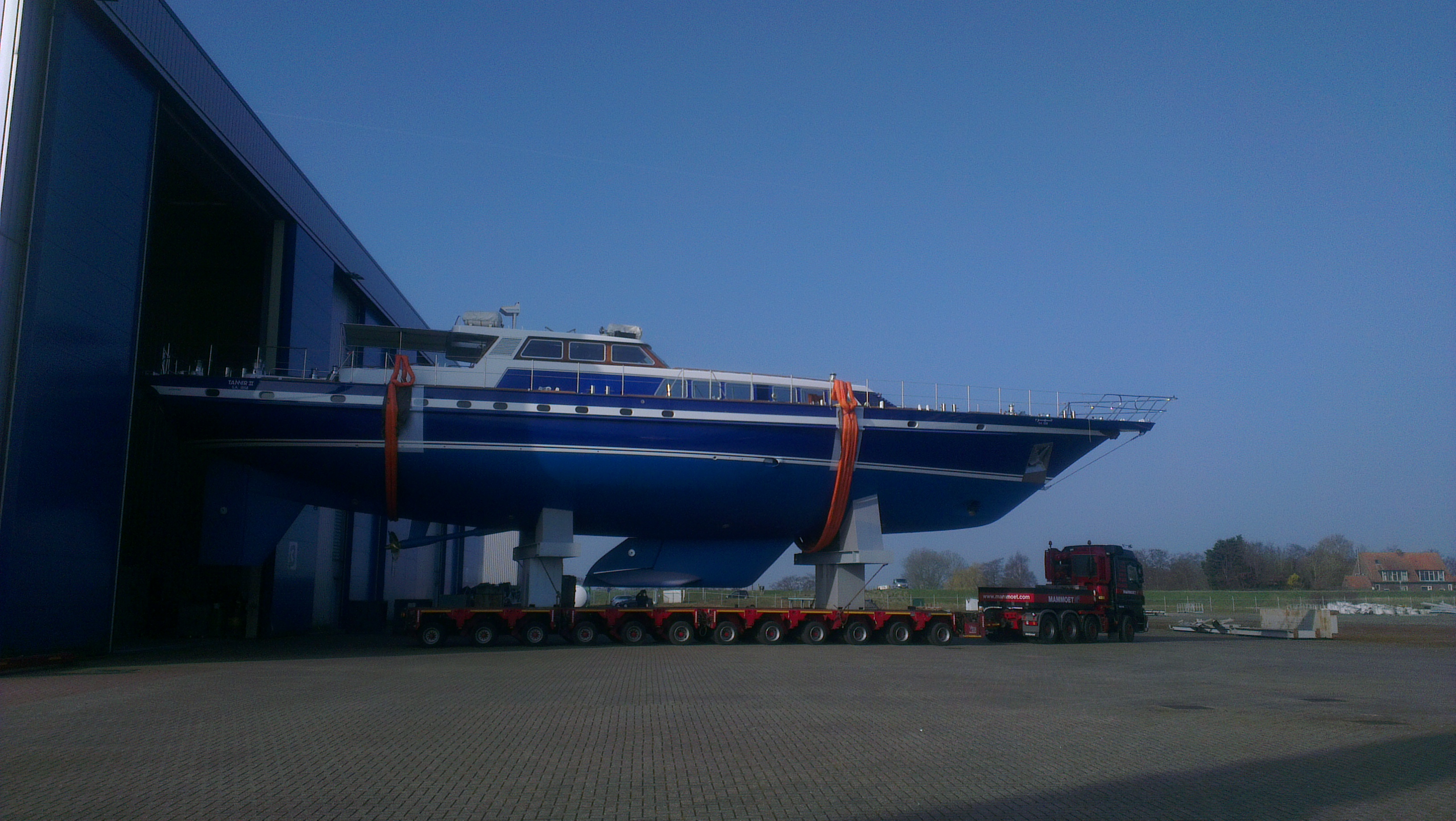
- Tamer II taken outside for re-launch

History

Saudi Arabia
- Name: Tamer II
- Owner: Maamoun Said Tamer
- Builder: Jongert
- Yard number: 339
- Launched: 1986

General characteristics
- Class & type: Sailing yacht
- Tonnage: 231 gross tons
- Length: 36.41 m (119.5 ft)
- Beam: 7.71 m (25.3 ft)
- Draught: 3.80 m (12.5 ft)
- Propulsion: Single screw
- Capacity: 8 passengers
- Crew: 5 crew members

Tamer II, a 36.41 m (119.5 ft) custom sailing yacht was built by Jongert in Medemblik, the Netherlands. The ship was delivered in 1986 and last refitted in 2015. Peter Sijm designed the exterior and interior. The naval architect was Doug Peterson.

Tamer II offers accommodation for up to eight guests. It can carry up to five crew. Tamer II is not available for charter.

== Refit ==
In 2015, Jongert completed the 18-month refit. The project started on December 2013 and was initially scheduled to take around 10 months to finish, but during the project the scope of work tripled. All of the yacht's technical spaces were emptied, sandblasted, spot-repaired, isolated, painted and re-equipped.

== See also ==
- List of large sailing yachts
- List of yachts built by Jongert
