= MV Geosea =

Royal Netherlands Navy patrol ship

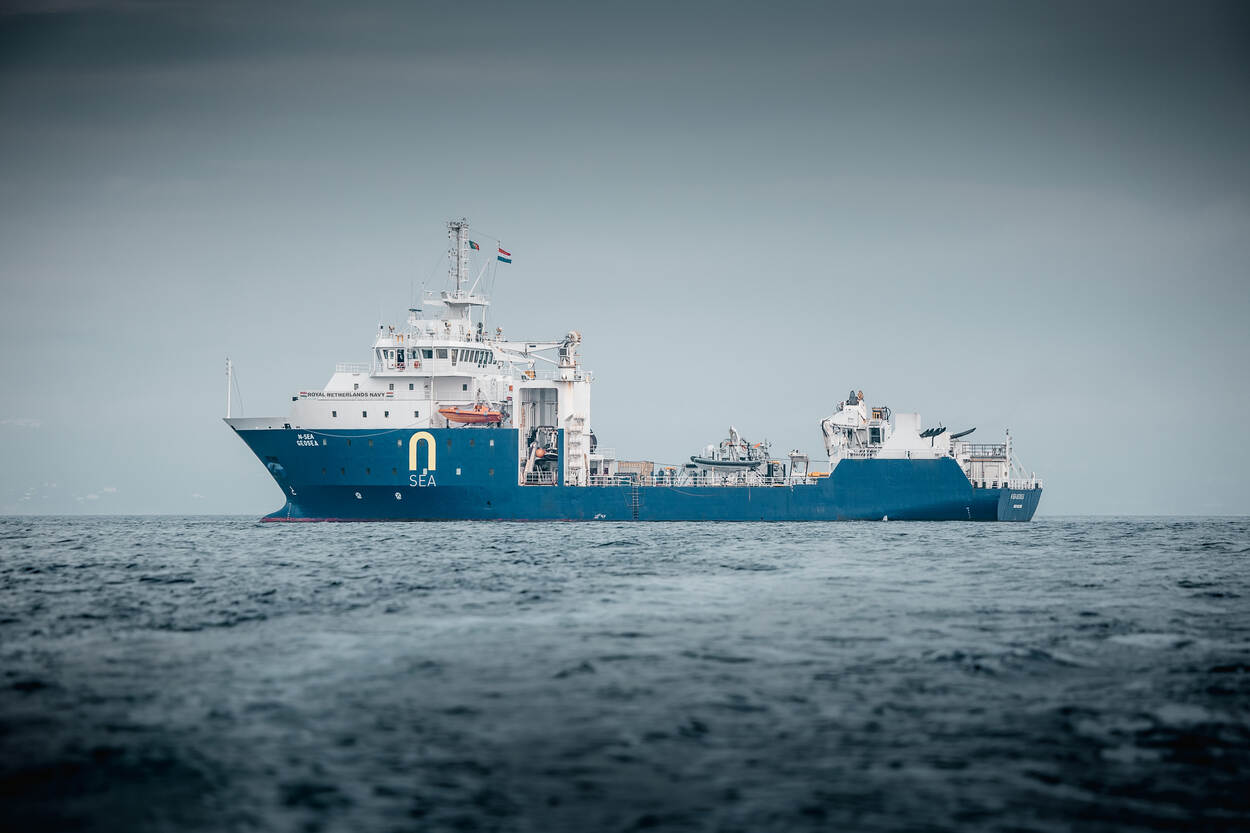
- MV Geosea

History

Netherlands
- Name: Geosea
- Owner: Geoshipping (2002–?); DOF Subsea (?–2022); N-Sea (2022–present)
- Builder: Astilleros Gondan, Castropol, Spain
- In service: 2002–present (general); 2020–present (Royal Netherlands Navy)
- Home port: Den Helder
- Identification: IMO number: 9242431; MMSI number: 245406000; Callsign: PDTR
- Status: In active service

General characteristics
- Type: Research vessel
- Tonnage: 3,253 GT
- Length: 84.8 m (278 ft 3 in)
- Draft: 5 m (16 ft 5 in)
- Installed power: 1,168 kW (1,566 hp)
- Propulsion: 4 × Cummins KTA 50 (G3) (D) M
- Speed: 13 knots (24 km/h; 15 mph) (max)
- Complement: 56

MV Geosea is a research vessel owned by offshore company N-Sea. She is leased to the Royal Netherlands Navy on a temporary basis and will be used as a testbed until the first of the new City-class mine countermeasures vessels enter service in 2025. While the ship is used by the Dutch Navy she will not be commissioned into the fleet. She will keep her civilian crew, which will be augmented by Dutch or Belgian sailors for testing the new systems.

== Service history ==
Geosea was built by Astilleros Gondan in Spain and delivered to her owners, Geoshipping, in 2002.

=== DOF Subsea ===
Geosea was used as a charter vessel for seabed research on locations of future offshore wind farms.

=== N-Sea ===
N-Sea chartered Geosea for a period, before it used a purchase option in the contract. The ship would be transferred in the 2nd or 3rd quarter of 2022. The vessel will still be leased by the navy.

=== Royal Netherlands Navy ===
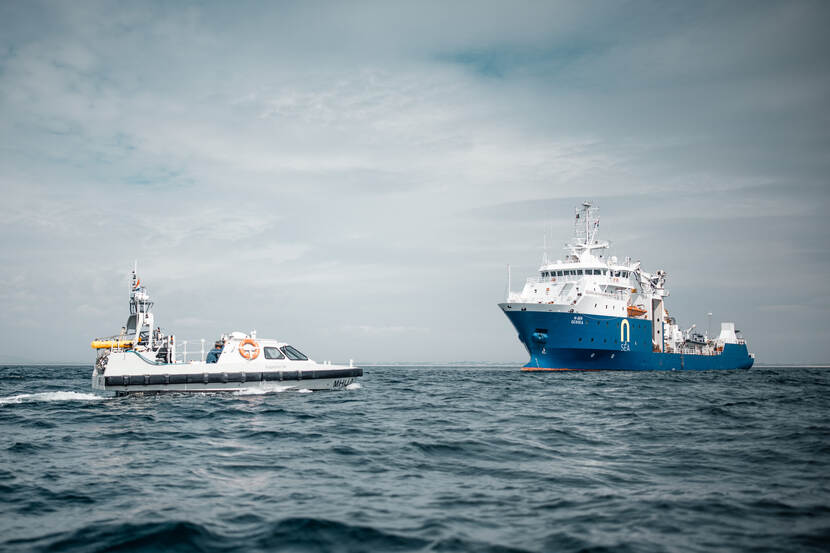
Geosea with a USV90 MCM drone

On 13 February 2020 a contract signing took place in which the Royal Netherlands Navy would lease the ship for a period of at least five years until the new mine countermeasures vessels come into service for the Dutch and Belgian navies.

In early June 2020, Geosea retrieved the portside anchor which belonged to HNLMS Rotterdam which it lost in February during storm Ciara.

During Exercise REP(MUS) 2024 Geosea participated along with HNLMS Johan de Witt both carrying various drone systems. Geosea operated for the first time with the USV90 drone. This is a prototype for the drones that will be used by the City class.

In 2025 Geosea took part in Sandy Coast 2025.

In September 2026 Geosea participated in Exercise REP(MUS) 2026.
