= RFA Sea Centurion =

Fast sealift ship chartered to the Royal Fleet Auxiliary

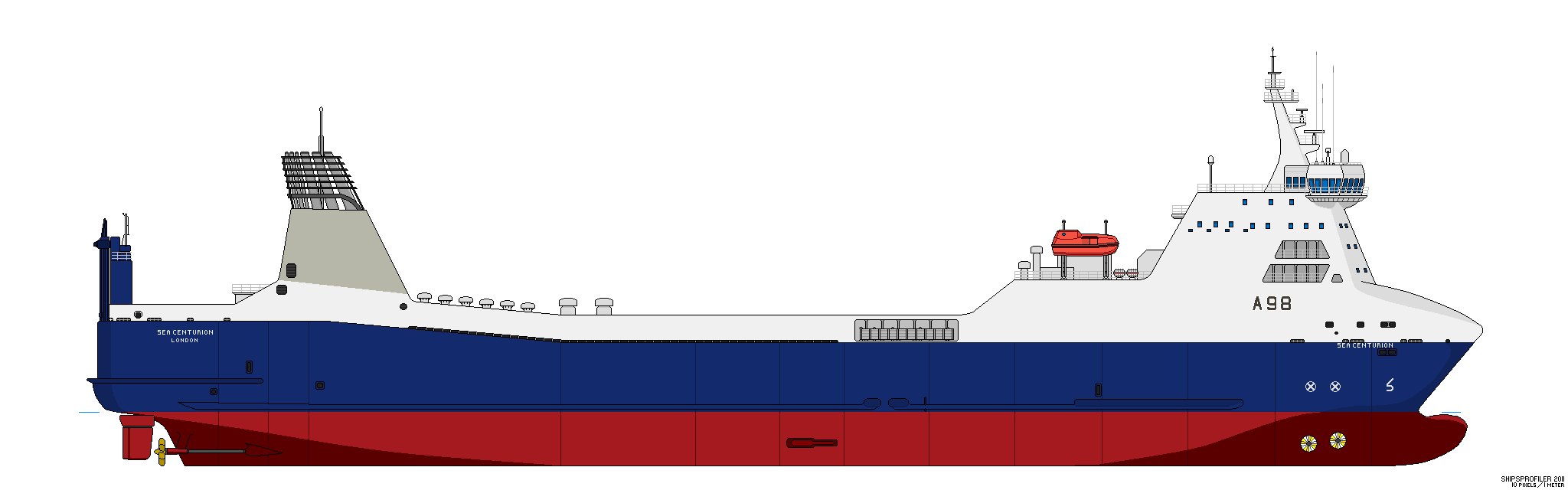

History

United Kingdom
- Name: Sea Centurion
- Builder: Società Esercizio Cantieri, Italy
- Launched: July 1997 as Stena Ausonia, later renamed Und Ege
- Commissioned: 18 October 1998 and renamed Sea Centurion
- Decommissioned: 25 July 2002
- Identification: IMO number: 9138783
- Fate: Returned to owners in 2002. Renamed Mont Ventoux in 2002, Stena Forwarder in 2005, Ark Forwarder in 2007

General characteristics
- Type: Sealift
- Tonnage: 21,104 GT
- Length: 185.4 m (608 ft 3 in)
- Beam: 22.5 m (73 ft 10 in)
- Draught: 8.3 m (27 ft 3 in)
- Propulsion: 4 × 8-cylinder Sulzer diesels
- Speed: 22 knots (41 km/h)
- Capacity: 2,700 lane metres
- Complement: 17

RFA Sea Centurion was a fast sealift ship chartered to Britain's Royal Fleet Auxiliary between 1998 and 2002 and subsequently in commercial service with Stena on Mediterranean routes as MS Ark Forwarder.

== Background ==
In the mid-1990s the British Ministry of Defence identified a need for sealift ships to support the new Joint Rapid Deployment Force (JRDF, subsequently the Joint Rapid Reaction Force). This requirement would ultimately be met by the construction of six Point-class sealift ships in 2002-3, but the charter of two commercial ships was approved as an interim measure.

== Description ==
Sea Centurion is the lead ship of what was planned as a class of five vehicle carriers of 21,104 gross tons, although only three were built due to financial problems at the shipyard. She is 185.4 metres (608 ft) long and powered by four 8-cylinder Sulzer diesels. She has 2700 lane metres of roll-on/roll-off capacity.

== History ==
Stena Ro-Ro ordered five ships from Società Esercizio Cantieri (SEC) at Viareggio in Tuscany, with ships 2 and 3 earmarked for charter to the British Ministry of Defence. Problems soon arose as the shipyard was too small and had to build the ships in three sections in different locations. Prolonged delays led to the Turkish operator UND walking away from the first ship, the Stena Ausonia (launched July 1997 as Stena Ausonia, later renamed Und Ege), which was delivered to the British in October 1998 as the Sea Centurion. Then SEC entered bankruptcy with the second ship, Sea Chieftain, 50% complete and the third, Transmed's Aronte had been launched. The British walked away from the Sea Chieftain and extended an existing charter on RFA Sea Crusader instead. Ships 2 and 3 were eventually completed after going through several shipyards and are now serving Stena as Stena Freighter and Stena Carrier on the Sweden-Germany route. Ships 4 and 5 were started but never completed.

After leaving RFA service the Sea Centurion became the Mont Ventoux in December 2002, the Stena Forwarder in August 2005 and the Ark Forwarder in February 2007. She was renamed Wilhelmsborg in May 2015, Ark Forwarder (again) in May 2016 and MSC Bridge in May 2018.

As of 2014 she is serving the Genoa-Palermo route for Stena under a Cypriot flag, homeported in Limassol.

As of 2026 she is actively sailing in the Mediterranean Sea as MSC Bridge under the flag of Cyprus.

== See also ==
- RFA Sea Crusader (A96)
- Point-class sealift ship
