= Wellenreiter =

History

Malta
- Name: Wellenreiter
- Builder: Jongert
- Yard number: 409
- Completed: 2003
- Identification: IMO number: 1007627; MMSI number: 215619000; Callsign: 9H7717
- Status: for sale

General characteristics
- Class & type: Sailing yacht
- Tonnage: 254 gross tons
- Length: 46.10 m (151 ft 3 in)
- Beam: 8.90 m (29 ft 2 in)
- Draught: 3.80 m (12 ft 6 in) (minimum); 6.70 m (22 ft) (maximum)
- Propulsion: Single MTU 499 kW (669 hp)
- Speed: 10.5 knots (19 km/h) (Cruising); 12 knots (22 km/h) (maximum)
- Capacity: 7 persons
- Crew: 6 persons

Wellenreiter is the largest yacht ever to be launched by Jongert. The ship was designed by André Hoek and built in 2003.

== Specifications ==
- Length overall: 46.10 m (151 ft 3 in)
- Load Waterline Length 34.00 m (111 ft 7 in)
- Beam: 8.90 m (29 ft 2 in)
- Draught (minimum): 3.80 m (12 ft 6 in)
- Draught (maximum): 6.70 m (22 ft)
- Rig: sloop
- Naval architecture: André Hoek
- Interior decoration: Jongert
- Hull material: steel
- Superstructure material: aluminium
- Spars: aluminium
- Main sail: 465 m^{2} (5,010 sq ft)
- Genoa: 465 m^{2} (5,010 sq ft)
- Staysail: 204 m^{2} (2,200 sq ft)
- General Arrangement: www.jongert.nl

== See also ==
- Sailing yacht
- List of large sailing yachts
- List of yachts built by Jongert
