= Foreland Shipping =

Company which owns the Point class sealift ships

Foreland Shipping Limited
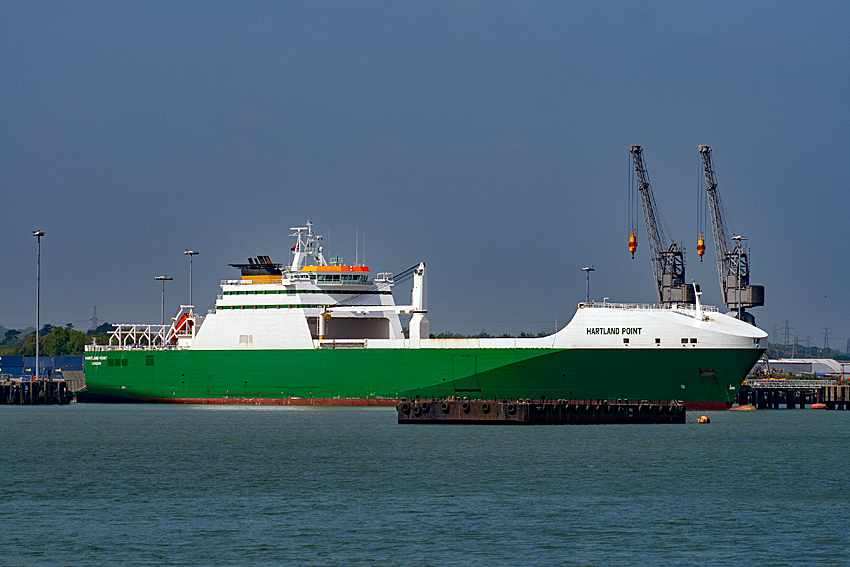
- MV Hartland Point at Marchwood
- Company type: Limited company
- Industry: Logistics
- Founded: 2001; 24 years ago
- Owner: Hadley Shipping Group
- Website: www.foreland-shipping.co.uk

Foreland Shipping Limited is a company formed for the express purpose of building and owning the Point class sealift ships. The six original ships were for the purpose of providing a transport capability to the British armed forces in times of emergency, but in normal circumstances four vessels were engaged on MoD related activities and two were operated as commercial ships. The crews are part of the naval reserve and are under military discipline when required for service by the UK government.

== History ==
The company was formed by a consortium of Bibby Line, Houlder Hadley, James Fisher plc and Andrew Weir Shipping in 2001. In August, 2013, James Fisher plc sold its 25% shareholding in Foreland to the Hadley Shipping Group. Foreland is currently wholly owned by the Hadley Shipping Group.

== Fleet ==
The company currently has a fleet of four ships, Anvil Point, Hartland Point, Hurst Point and Eddystone. Two more ships, Beachy Head and Longstone, were sold in 2013 as part of MoD reviews and cut backs. For MoD service the ships are based at Marchwood.

== Incidents ==
Over three days 28 - 30 November 2014, the crew of the Anvil Point rescued 150 migrant refugees off the coast of Sicily. The ship's assistance was requested after coastguard vessels were unable to approach due to adverse weather conditions. In December, 2016, Captain Nigel A. Barningham, Master, was awarded the "Merchant Navy Medal" by the UK Merchant Navy Association (MNA) for his crew's efforts.
