= HNLMS Pelikaan (A804) =

Logistic support vessel

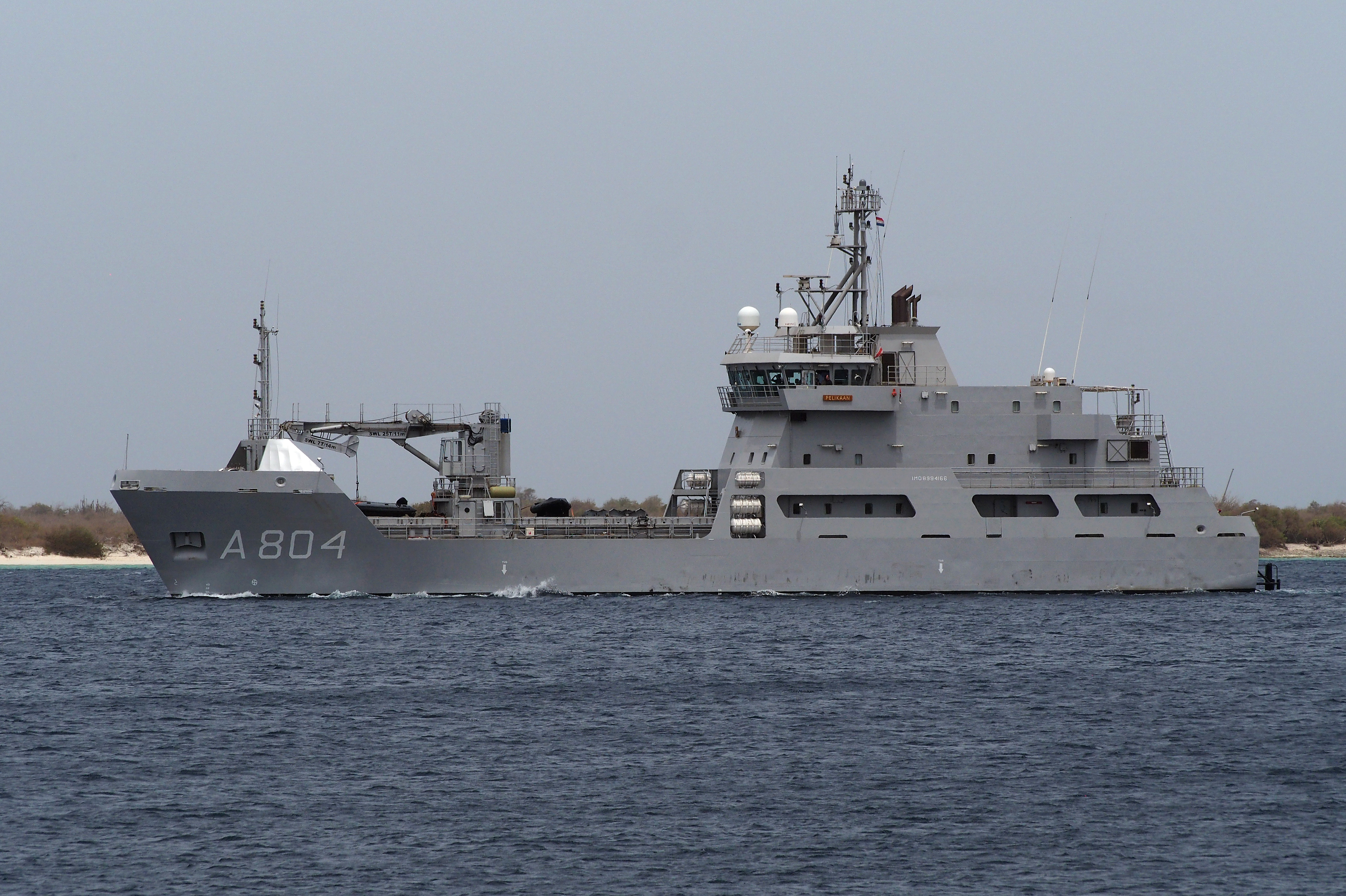
- HNLMS Pelikaan off the coast of Klein Bonaire

Class overview
- Builders: Damen Group yard, Galați, Romania
- Operators: Royal Netherlands Navy
- Preceded by: Pelikaan
- Built: 2005–2006
- In commission: 2006–present
- Planned: 1
- Completed: 1
- Active: 1

History

Netherlands
- Name: Pelikaan
- Ordered: 10 January 2005
- Laid down: 25 August 2005
- Launched: 7 February 2006
- Commissioned: 12 June 2006
- Identification: Pennant number: A804; IMO number: 8994166; MMSI number: 244362000; Callsign: PAKU
- Status: In active service
- Badge

General characteristics
- Type: Logistic support vessel
- Displacement: 1,700 t (1,673 long tons) full load
- Length: 65.4 m (214 ft 7 in)
- Beam: 13.25 m (43 ft 6 in)
- Draught: 3 m (9 ft 10 in)
- Propulsion: 2× Caterpillar 3516 BTA diesel engines
- Speed: 14.5 knots (26.9 km/h; 16.7 mph)
- Boats & landing craft carried: 6 RIBs
- Troops: 62
- Complement: 15
- Armament: 2 × 12.7 mm (0.50 in) machine guns

HNLMS Pelikaan (A804) is a logistic support vessel of the Royal Netherlands Navy. The ship was built and designed specially for the Caribbean Sea, and is permanently based at Curaçao. She entered service on 12 June 2006. The vessel has the Det Norske Veritas (DNV) Classification 1A1 E0 NAUT-OC ICS CRANE. Pelikaan provides search and rescue and disaster and humanitarian relief to Dutch operations in the Netherlands Antilles. The vessel can also be used for amphibious warfare.

== Design and description ==
Pelikaan is a logistic support vessel of the Royal Netherlands Navy designed for use in the Netherlands Antilles and the Caribbean Sea and to provide sealift for the Netherlands Marine Corps. She is based on the Damen LSV 6513. Naval ships in the Caribbean perform a series of policing tasks involving drug smuggling and fisheries protection, along with providing search-and-rescue and disaster and humanitarian relief. The vessel measures 65.4 metres (214 ft 7 in) long with a beam of 13.25 metres (43 ft 6 in) and a draught of 3 metres (9 ft 10 in). The vessel has a displacement of 1,400 tonnes (1,400 long tons) and 1,700 tonnes (1,700 long tons) at full load. (Note: Marineschepen has the maximum displacement at 1,150 tonnes (1,130 long tons).) The ship is powered by two Caterpillar 3516 BTA diesel engines creating 3,000 kilowatts (4,000 bhp) turning two fixed-pitch propellers with a maximum speed of 14.5 knots (26.9 km/h; 16.7 mph).

The ship is armed with two single-mounted 12.7-millimetre (0.50 in) machine guns. Pelikaan has a large cargo area located on the main deck. The area, serviced by a large electro-hydraulic deck crane forward, can be used for amphibious operations, with space for six rigid inflatable boats, four trucks and support equipment. The ship can support up to 77 personnel, including 15 crew with space for 62 marines. (Note: Wertheim has the ship with a complement of 14 with space for 57 additional troops. Saunders has Pelikaan crewed by 14 including two officers with space for 60 additional troops.) Pelikaan is capable of transporting 70,000 litres (15,000 imp gal; 18,000 US gal) of water and creating an additional 6,000 litres (1,300 imp gal; 1,600 US gal) per day.

== History ==
The Royal Netherlands Navy placed an order with Damen Shipbuilding for a replacement for the existing logistic support vessel operating in the Caribbean, HNLMS Pelikaan (A801), on 10 January 2005. The vessel's hull was constructed at the Damen shipyard in Galați, Romania with the keel laid down on 25 August 2005 and launched on 7 February 2006. The hull was then taken to Gorinchem, Netherlands to be completed and Pelikaan was commissioned on 12 June 2006.

In January 2010, the ship arrived at Port-au-Prince with relief supplies for the victims of the 2010 Haiti earthquake. She was the first ship to use the Port international de Port-au-Prince after the quake. On 14 November 2011, Pelikaan recovered two castaways 200 kilometres (120 mi) off the coast of Martinique. In March 2013, Pelikaan sailed to Saba to provide drinking water after the island suffered a serious drought.

In March 2014 visited Sint Maarten and took part in an amphibious training exercise with the Sint Maarten Marine Detachment that are stationed at Pointe Blanche Naval Support Point.

In 2015, Pelikaan provided support to Dominica after the island nation was struck by a tropical storm. The vessel returned to Haiti in 2016 to provide aid following the arrival of Hurricane Matthew. In September 2017, the ship provided support to Sint Maarten after the island was struck by Hurricane Irma.

In January 2018, the Royal Netherlands Navy contracted COTECMAR to carry out maintenance work for the ship at their yard in Cartagena, Colombia. Pelikaan underwent modernisation in 2020 in the Netherlands.
