= Bolder-class tugboat =

Class of tug boats used by the Royal Netherlands Navy

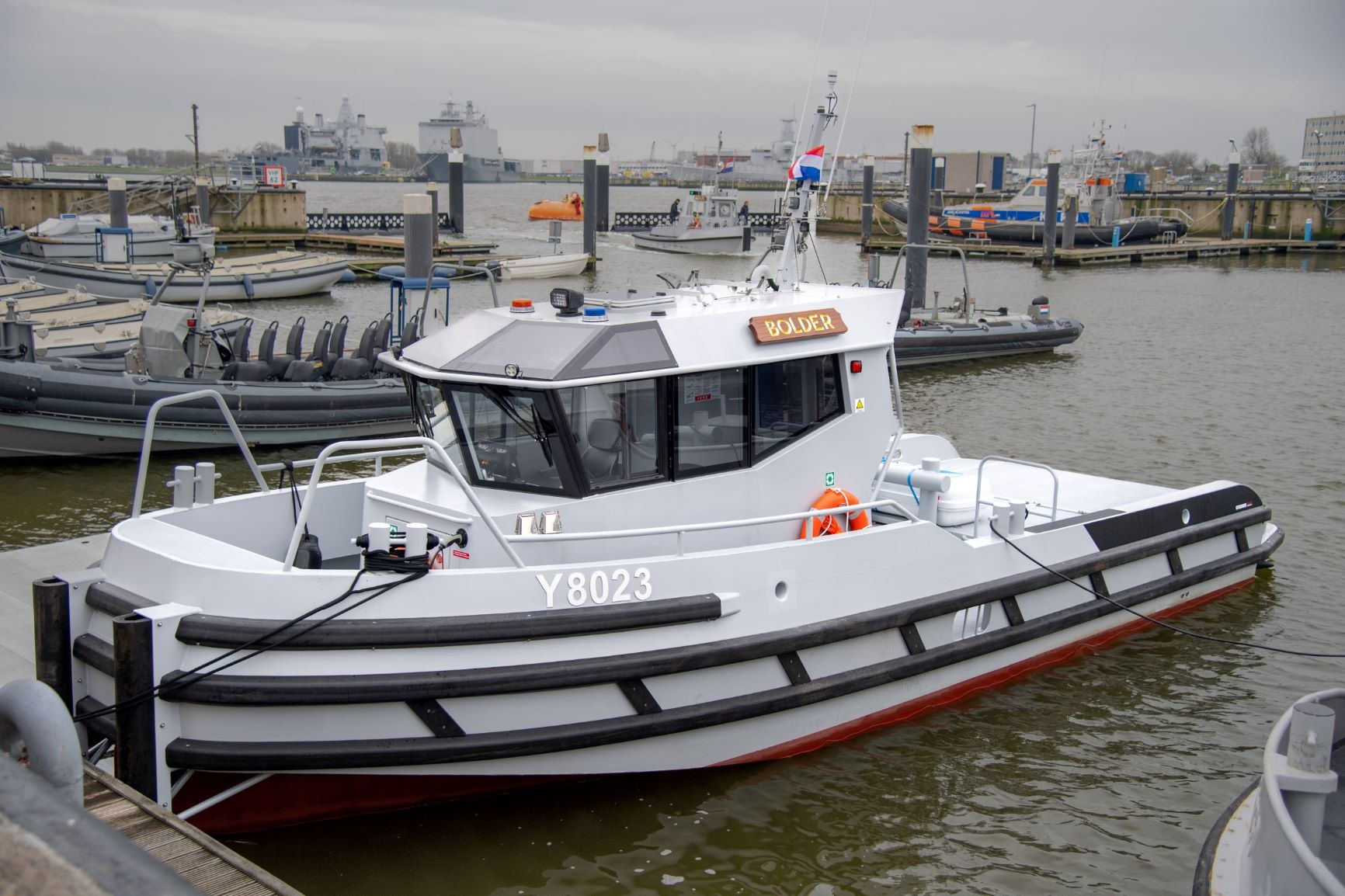
- Y8023 Bolder

Class overview
- Name: Bolder class
- Builders: Stormer Marine, Hoorn
- Operators: Royal Netherlands Navy
- Preceded by: Schelde class
- Built: 2022–2025
- In service: 2023–present
- Planned: 3
- Completed: 3
- Active: 3

General characteristics
- Type: Harbour tugboat
- Displacement: 9.5 t (9 long tons) full load
- Length: 11 m (36 ft 1 in)
- Beam: 4 m (13 ft 1 in)
- Propulsion: Fully electric
- Speed: 11 knots (20 km/h; 13 mph)
- Range: 43 nautical miles (80 km; 49 mi)
- Capacity: 8 passengers
- Crew: 2

The Bolder class, formerly known as the Line Handling Work Boat, was announced on 21 November 2022 by the Royal Netherlands Navy. Its primary task is moving large fenders and helping to dock larger ships at the Nieuwe Haven Naval Base by moving lines. The LHWB ships replaced the five ships from the Schelde class. They were built by Stormer Marine in Hoorn. Delivery of the first vessel took place on 22 November 2023, the second on 9 July 2024, and the last 3 April 2025.

== Service history ==
During National Lifeboat Day in May 2026 the three Bolder class tugs were moored at Harssens in Groningen.

== Ships in class ==
The name of the class was announced as the Bolder class on 20 June 2023. The names of the ships are inspired by Dutch terms used in the towing industry: Bolder, Beting and Bakspier, respectively.

Bolder class construction data
Hull number	Name	Builder	In service	Status	Notes
Y8023	Bolder	Stormer Marine, Hoorn	22 November 2023	In active service	
Y8024	Beting	Stormer Marine, Hoorn	9 July 2024	In active service	
Y8025	Bakspier	Stormer Marine, Hoorn	3 April 2025	In active service	

== See also ==
- Future of the Royal Netherlands Navy
