= RFA Sea Crusader =

Fast sealift ship chartered to the Royal Fleet Auxiliary

History

United Kingdom
- Name: RFA Sea Crusader
- Ordered: 17 March 1995
- Builder: Kawasaki Heavy Industries, Sakaide, Japan
- Yard number: 1465
- Laid down: 18 March 1996
- Launched: 7 June 1996 as Celestine
- Commissioned: 10 October 1996 and renamed Sea Crusader
- Decommissioned: 7 August 2003
- Identification: IMO number: 9125372; MMSI number: 249444000 (as Celestine); Callsign: 9HA4248 (as Celestine)
- Fate: Returned to owners in 2003 and name reverted to Celestine

General characteristics
- Type: Sealift
- Tonnage: 23,986 GT
- Length: 162.49 m (533 ft 1 in)
- Beam: 25.2 m (82 ft 8 in)
- Draught: 6.52 m (21 ft 5 in)
- Propulsion: 2 × 7 cyl Kawasaki MAN-B&W 7L40/54 diesels of 6,690 shp each
- Speed: 18 knots (33 km/h)
- Complement: 17

RFA Sea Crusader was a fast sealift ship chartered to Britain's Royal Fleet Auxiliary between 1996 and 2003 and subsequently in commercial service with Cobelfret on North Sea routes as MV Celestine. She was described by the RFA as a "Strategic Lift Ro-Ro".

== Background ==
In the mid-1990s the British Ministry of Defence identified a need for sealift ships to support the new Joint Rapid Deployment Force (JRDF, subsequently the Joint Rapid Reaction Force). This requirement would ultimately be met by the construction of six Point-class sealift ships in 2002–3, but the charter of two commercial ships was approved as an interim measure.

== Description ==
Sea Crusader/Celestine is the lead ship of a class of six vehicle carriers of 23,986 GT. She is 162.5 metres (533 ft) long and powered by two MAN B&W 7L40/54 diesels of 6,690 shp each. She can carry 654 cars and 157 trailers.

== History ==
Kawasaki Heavy Industries built MV Celestine at Sakaide shipyard, Japan in 1996. In October of that year the RFA took the newly built ship on a two-year charter from Oceanarrow (UK) Ltd as RFA Sea Crusader. She would be joined by RFA Sea Centurion in October 1998. The original intention was that Sea Crusader would be replaced by the charter of a new-build sister ship to Sea Centurion, but construction problems with the Sea Chieftain led to the charter of the Sea Crusader being extended until 1 March 2003. After RFA service the ship was renamed to MV Celestine (again).

As of 2014 she is serving the Purfleet and Immingham routes to Zeebrugge for Cobelfret Ferries under a Belgian flag, homeported in Antwerp.

As of 2026 she is actively sailing in the Persian Gulf as Jabal Ali 11 under the flag of St Kitts & Nevis.
