= HNLMS Hydrograaf (2021) =

Dutch expeditionary survey boat

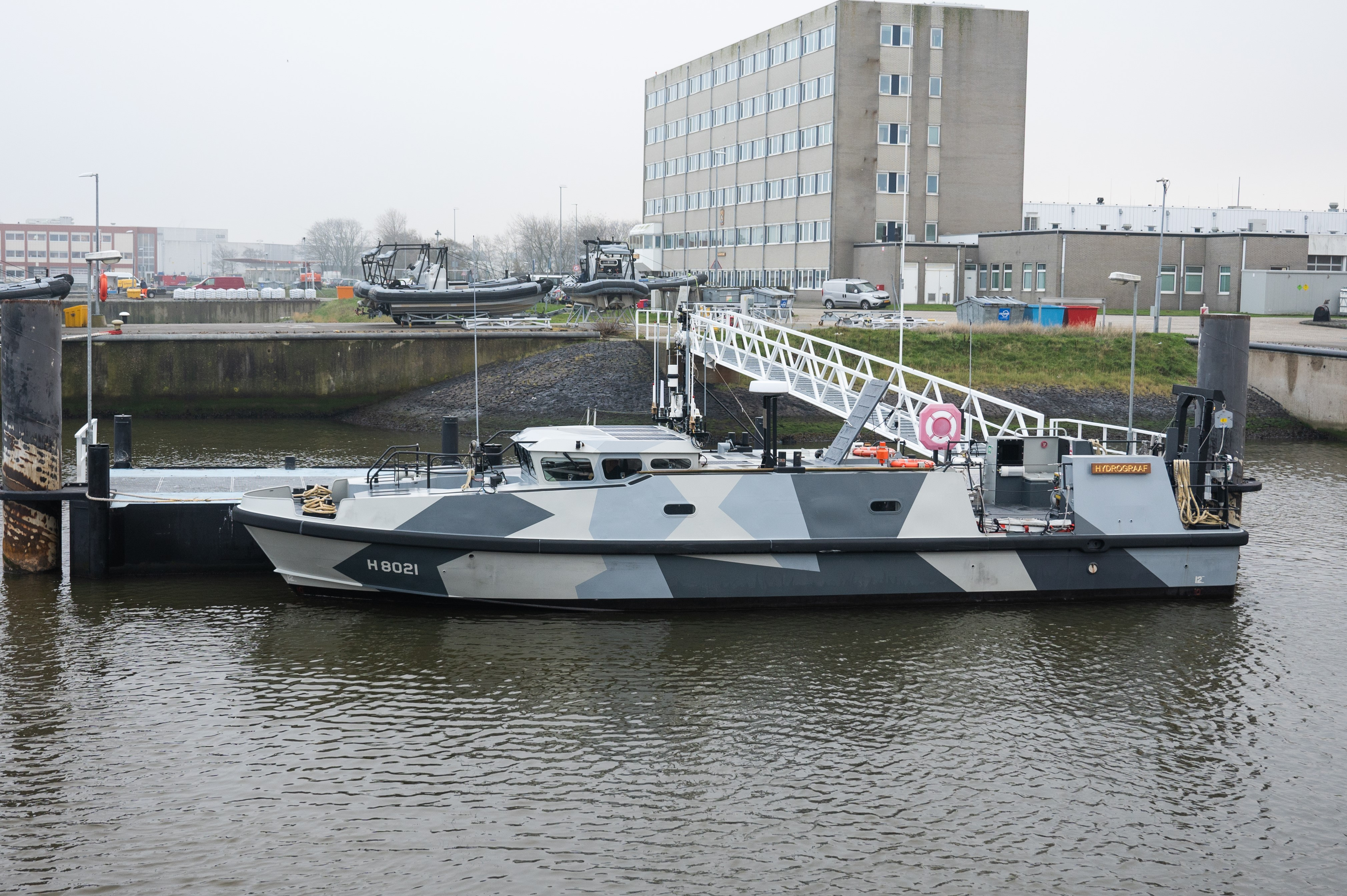
- Hydrograaf

Class overview
- Name: Expeditionary survey boat (ESB)
- Builders: Damen Group, Den Helder, Netherlands
- Operators: Royal Netherlands Navy
- Built: 2019–2021
- In commission: 2021–present
- Planned: 1
- Completed: 1
- Active: 1

History

Netherlands
- Name: Hydrograaf
- Laid down: 2019
- Launched: 21 January 2021
- Commissioned: 26 February 2021
- Home port: Den Helder
- Identification: Pennant number: H8021
- Status: in active service

General characteristics
- Type: Expeditionary Survey Boat (ESB)
- Tonnage: 22 GT
- Length: 15.70 m (51 ft 6 in)
- Beam: 4.27 m (14 ft 0 in)
- Propulsion: 2 diesel engines 1,564 hp (1,166 kW)
- Speed: 20 knots (37 km/h; 23 mph)
- Crew: 4
- Armament: 1 × MAG machine gun

HNLMS Hydrograaf (H8021) is an expeditionary survey boat (ESB) of the Royal Netherlands Navy.

== History ==
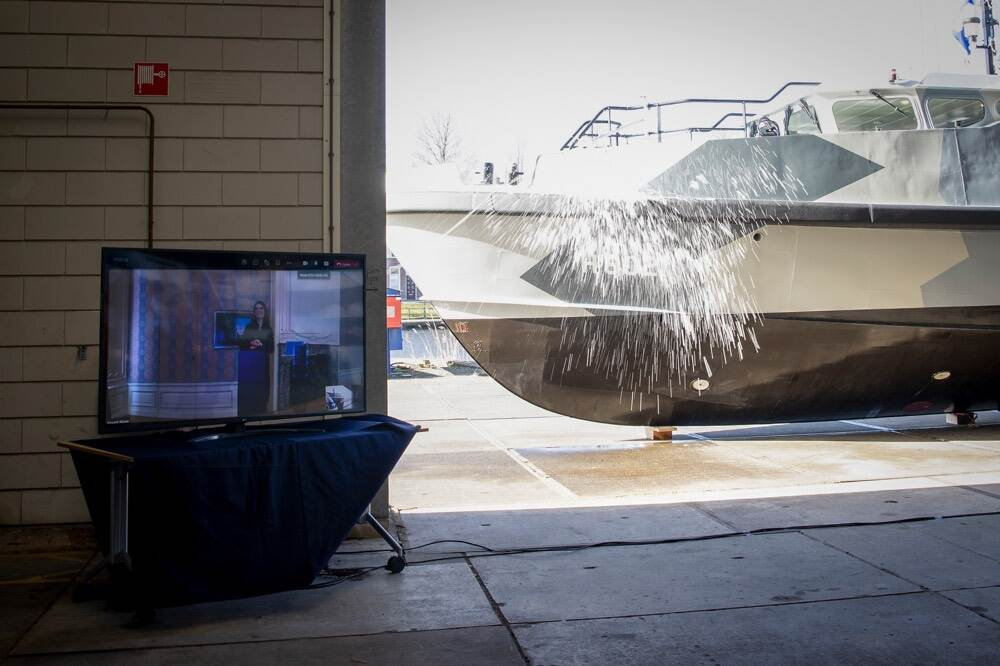
Hydrograaf at the commissioning ceremony

Hydrograaf fills the gap between the Snellius-class hydrographic survey vessels and the rigid-hulled inflatable boats (RHIBs) or sloops which are launched from the larger ships from the Dutch Navy. The RHIBs and sloops became to small or old to be used effectively and sail further from the mother ship.

In 2016 the DMO wrote a European invitation to tender for the construction of one ESB. In March 2019 a contract was signed with Damen Den Helder and construction started later that year. The Hydrograaf was launched on 21 January 2021 and commissioned on 26 February 2021 via video call by then State Secretary for Defence Barbara Visser.

The ESB is carried in a davit on board a Rotterdam-class landing platform dock or HNLMS Karel Doorman to its work area. Hydrograaf has a range of 100 nautical miles (190 km; 120 mi) and an operation time of 60 hours at 5 knots (9.3 km/h; 5.8 mph).
