= MV New Amsterdam =

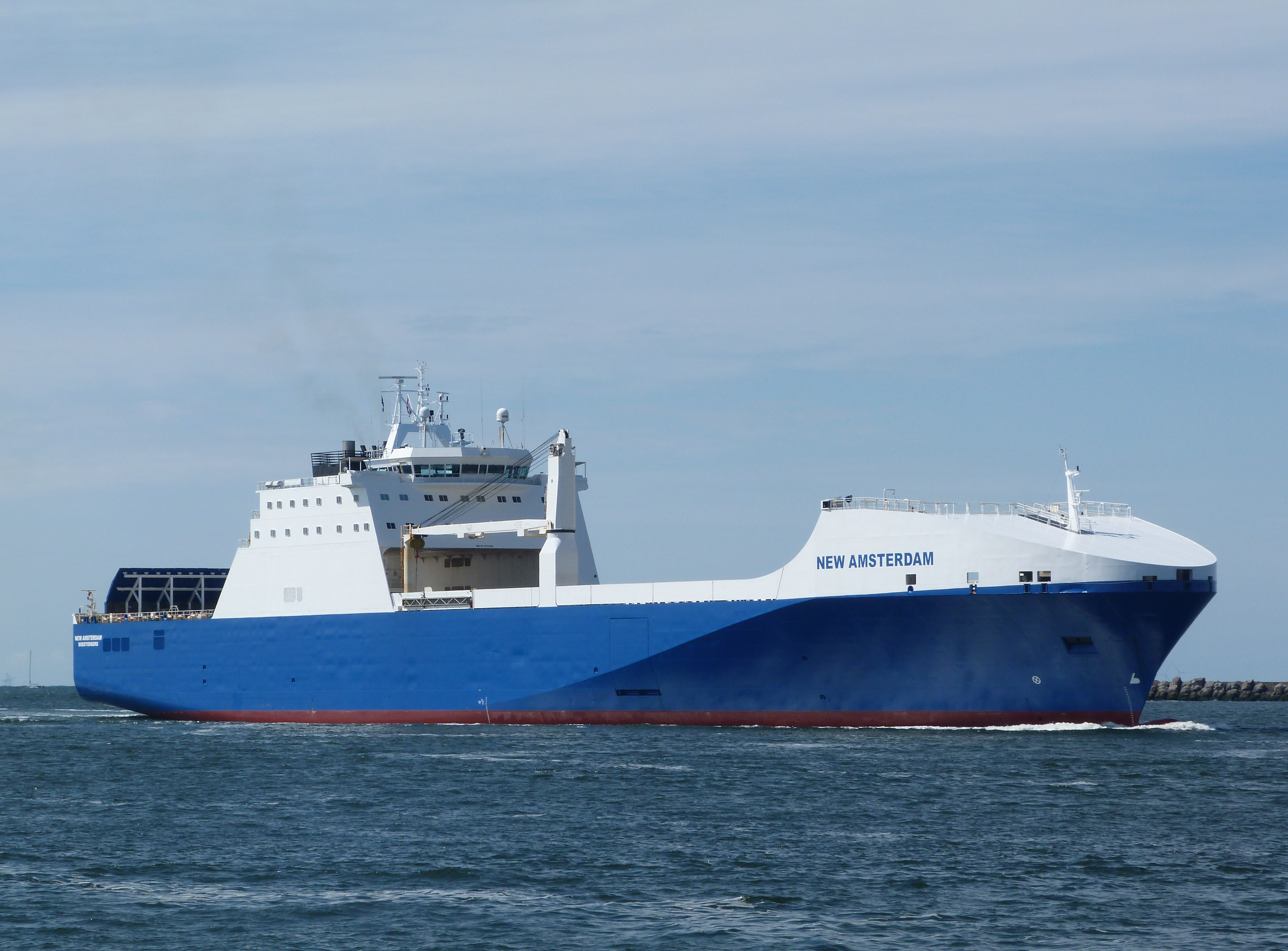

History
- Name: New Amsterdam
- Owner: TransProCon
- Home port: Eemshaven

General characteristics
- Type: Point-class roll-on/roll-off cargo ship

MV New Amsterdam is a cargo ship owned by TransProCon, which is part of Swedish Orient line. On 14 January 2022 the Dutch Ministry of Defence signed a contract to lease the ship for a duration of ten years. She will be used for military logistics, such as strategic transport of military equipment and goods. During her lease Eemshaven will be the homeport of the New Amsterdam.

== History ==
In the past the Dutch Ministry of Defence (MoD) occasionally leased ships for military logistics. However, increasing scarcity of such ships on the market has led to uncertainty and expensive leases. To ensure the MoD has access to strategic sea transport capacity it decided to lease the New Amsterdam in 2022 from TransProCon for a duration of ten years. She can also be used by allied nations in exchange for a fee. The ship will be based at the Eemshaven and officially entered service on 25 July 2022.

== Design ==
New Amsterdam is a roll-on-roll-off cargo ship that can load and unload at sea without quay support a maximum of 75.000 kilogram and when moored with quay support a maximum of 150.000 kg. Aboard the ship there is enough space to carry at the same time two hundred containers and three hundred vehicles with each having an average length of six meters. The decks are also strong enough to support tanks and other heavy material. In addition, New Amsterdam is also equipped with a 40 tons crane that has a range of 25 meters.

== Service history ==
In July 2022 New Amsterdam was loaded with material to support troops in Lithuania. After arriving in the port of Klaipėda she will be unloaded and the material will be destined for the Dutch soldiers that are part of the enhanced forward presence (eFP).
