= HNLMS Hydrograaf (1910) =

Royal Netherlands Navy survey vessel

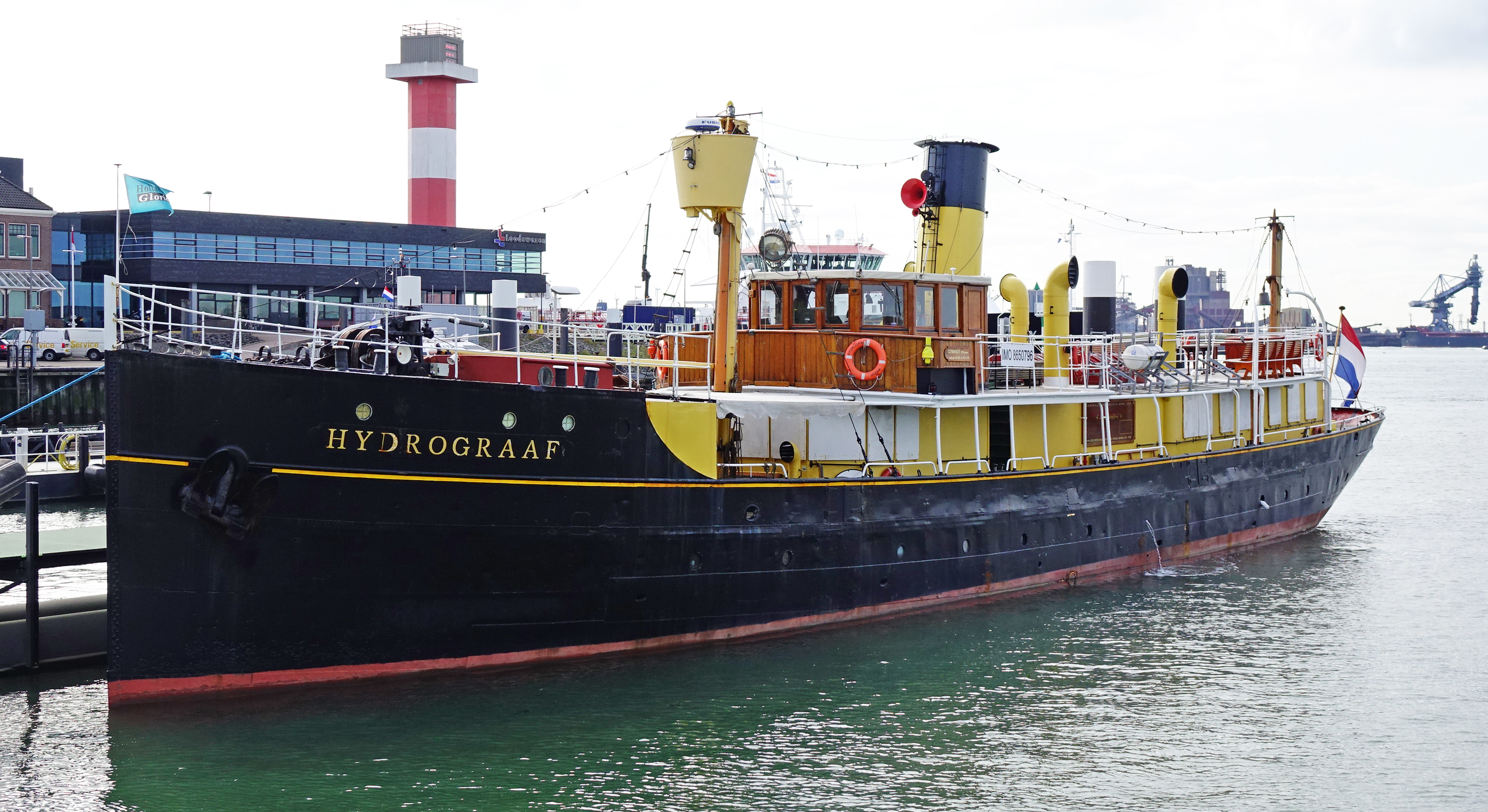
- HNLMS Hydrograaf in modern times

History

Netherlands
- Name: Hydrograaf
- Namesake: Hydrography
- Builder: Maatschappij voor Scheeps- en Werktuigbouw Fijenoord, Rotterdam
- Laid down: 11 October 1909
- Launched: 26 January 1910
- Commissioned: 4 May 1910
- Decommissioned: 16 October 1962
- Fate: Gifted to Sea Cadet Corps 1962; Sold to private owner 1983

General characteristics
- Type: Hydrographic survey vessel
- Displacement: 297 t (292 long tons) standard
- Length: 40.5 m (132 ft 10 in)
- Beam: 6.7 m (22 ft 0 in)
- Draught: 1.8 m (5 ft 11 in)
- Installed power: 960 hp (720 kW)
- Propulsion: 2 × steam engine powering 2 screws
- Speed: 10.5 knots (19.4 km/h; 12.1 mph)
- Complement: 18

HNLMS Hydrograaf was a Royal Netherlands Navy survey vessel. Commissioned 4 May 1910, the ship served through both world wars. It was eventually gifted to the Sea Cadet Corps where it would serve as their Corps ship until sold to a private buyer in 1983. The ship was hireable as a party ship from 1985 onwards after receiving a restoration. From 1985 until 2022 the ship served as Sinterklaas's Pakjesboot 12.

== Service history ==
HNLMS Hydrograaf served as a hydrographic survey vessel of the Royal Netherlands Navy from 1910 throughout World War I until the fall of the Netherlands in World War II.

Hydrograaf was stationed at Den Helder when the Netherlands was attacked by German forces. She was transferred to Vlissingen to map out German naval mines which had been deployed from aircraft, but escaped to England once it became clear that the Netherlands was about to capitulate. Once arrived in England, the ship served as a barracks ship and depot ship until October 1944 when she was recommissioned as a hydrographic survey vessel to map out the entranceway to Antwerp harbor.

After the war's end, the vessel continued to serve in this role until decommissioned on 16 October 1962 and transferred to the Sea Cadet Corps where it served as the Corps Ship. Hydrograaf was sold to a private buyer in 1982 who restored the ship, replaced the steam engines with two diesel engines and offered the ship for hire from 1985 onwards as a party ship.

The ship served as Pakjesboot 12 for the Dutch tradition of Sinterklaas from 1985 until 2022 when it was renamed to De Stoomboot.
