= Pointe Blanche Naval Support Point =

Dutch naval base in Sint Maarten

Pointe Blanche Naval Support Point
- Marinesteunpunt Pointe Blanche
- Pointe Blanche, Sint Maarten
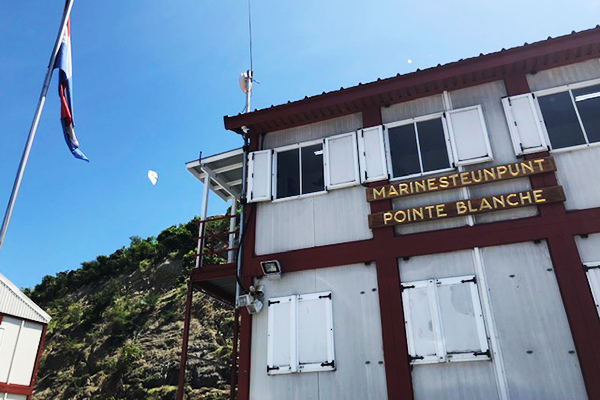

Site information
- Operator: Royal Netherlands Navy
- Controlled by: Kingdom of the Netherlands
- Condition: Operational

Site history
- In use: 2013 - present

Garrison information
- Garrison: Sint Maarten Marine Detachment

Pointe Blanche Naval Support Point (Dutch: Marinesteunpunt Pointe Blanche; MSTPPB) is a base of the Royal Netherlands Navy that is located on Sint Maarten. Since 2014 a detachment of the Netherlands Marine Corps is permanently stationed at the base. The marines of this detachment are nicknamed Green Angels by the locals. They provide military support to Sint Maarten, Saba and Sint Eustatius.

== History ==
Pointe Blanche Naval Support Point was established in 2013 at Pointe Blanche, Sint Maarten. The base was established to meet the local government's desire for a military presence on Sint Maarten. While the base was established in 2013, the first twenty marines arrived a year later on 4 March 2014. In total there are 29 persons stationed at the base, which includes a staff consisting of 9 persons. Together they form the Sint Maarten Marine Detachment (Dutch: Detachment Mariniers Sint-Maarten; DETSXM). The Netherlands Marine Corps detachment can provide support for various matters, ranging from search and rescue operations to assisting the local police with prison searches. At the base the marines have access to two FRISC's and near the base there are several training facilities. These facilities have been improved and expanded over the years.

In 2015, because of the 400th anniversary of the Dutch Marine Corps, the support point started organizing the "Beat The Marines Challenge". Intended as a one time event, this multidisciplinary endurance contest grew into a yearly tradition on the St. Maarten events calendar.

The marines stationed at Pointe Blanche Naval Support Point frequently take part in exercises, such as the Hurricane Relief Exercise (HUREX). They also work together with the local police, fire department, emergency medical services and the Sint Maarten Volunteer Corps.

In February 2026 the definitive design of a new four-story building was unveiled. It will replace the current building and will be built near the Great Bay in the coming years.

== Notes ==
=== Bibliography ===
- Gerritsen-Schutmaat, J.; Enklaar, M.E.A.; Kramer, W.A., eds. (15 June 2023). Jaarboek Koninklijke Marine 2014 (in Dutch). The Hague: Nederlands Instituut voor Militaire Historie.
- Middelwijk, M.; Potters, M.C.; van der Peet, A.J.; Kramer, W.A., eds. (8 March 2024). Jaarboek van de Koninklijke Marine 2018 (in Dutch). Den Helder: Nederlands Instituut voor Militaire Historie. ISBN 9789070677596.
- Mulders, T.; Gerritsen-Schutmaat, J.; Kramer, W.A., eds. (14 June 2023). Jaarboek van de Koninklijke Marine 2015 (in Dutch). The Hague: Nederlands Instituut voor Militaire Historie.
- Potters, M.C.; Middelwijk, M.; van der Peet, A.J.; Kramer, W.A., eds. (8 March 2024). Jaarboek van de Koninklijke Marine 2017 (in Dutch). Nederlands Instituut voor Militaire Historie. ISBN 9789070677572.
