= Jongert =

Shipyard in Wieringerwerf, Netherlands

Jongert Bv
- Industry: Yacht Building, Shipbuilding
- Founded: 1953
- Headquarters: Wieringerwerf, Netherlands
- Area served: Worldwide
- Products: Sailing yacht, Motor yacht
- Website: Official Website

Jongert is a shipyard specialized in the building of sailing yachts, located in Wieringerwerf, Netherlands.

== History ==
The shipyard was established by Jan Jongert, Sr., in Medemblik in 1953 and produced sailing yachts between 20 m (66 ft) and 50 m (160 ft) in length. Between 1970 and 1994 the yard exported cumulatively in excess of half a billion guilders worth of yachts. Most of the later vessels were designed by Tony Castro and built from steel or aluminium.

Jongert went bankrupt in 2009, then restarted under the ownership of VEKA Group, led by director Peter Versluis, who acquired the shipyard as part of a consortium. The other partners in the consortium were not named at the time. In 2015 the company went bankrupt again.

In 2016 the company is active.

On January 19, 2017, the company announced it had found a new investor, following the failed takeover of the yard by Acico. Together with the Vripack design studio, they were working on a 47 m (154 ft) motor yacht project.

== See also ==
- Tamer II
- Wellenreiter
- List of sailboat designers and manufacturers
- List of large sailing yachts
