= Royal Netherlands Navy =

- Koninklijke Marine
- Emblem of the Royal Netherlands Navy
- Founded: 8 January 1488; 538 years ago
- Country: Netherlands
- Type: Navy
- Size: 12,411 personnel (2025): 7,324 active military personnel; 3,226 civilian personnel; 1,861 reservists; 3 attack submarines; 6 frigates; 4 offshore patrol vessels; 3 minehunters; 1 replenishment oiler; 1 joint support ship; 2 landing platform docks; 40 other ships; 19 helicopters: NH90 NFH
- Part of: Netherlands Armed Forces
- Headquarters: Den Helder
- Mottos: Veiligheid op en vanuit zee Security on and from the sea.
- March: Defileermars der Koninklijke Marine (Royal Netherlands Navy Service Marchpast)
- Engagements: Eighty Years' War; Dutch–Portuguese War; Anglo-Dutch wars War of the Spanish Succession; War of the Quadruple Alliance; French Revolutionary Wars; World War II; Indonesian National Revolution; Korean War; West New Guinea dispute Operation Prosperity Guardian

Commanders
- Commander: Vice-Admiral Harold Liebregs
- Deputy commander: Major General Rob de Wit
- Notable commanders: Michiel de Ruyter, Piet Hein, Maarten Tromp, Karel Doorman

Insignia
- Flag

- Naval ensign

- Naval jack

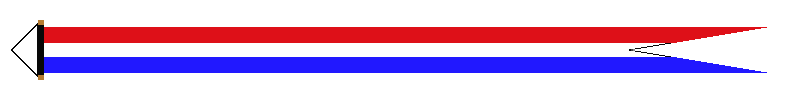
- Pennant

- Logo

Aircraft flown
- Patrol: NH90 NFH

The Royal Netherlands Navy (RNLN) (Dutch: Koninklijke Marine, pronounced [ˈkoːnɪŋkləkə maːˈrinə], meaning 'Royal Navy') is the maritime service branch of the Netherlands Armed Forces. It traces its history to 8 January 1488, making it the third-oldest navy in the world.

During the 17th and early 18th centuries, the Dutch States Navy was one of the most powerful navies in the world and played an active role in the Anglo-Dutch Wars, Franco-Dutch War, Nine Years' War and War of the Spanish Succession. However, by the late 18th century it had declined through neglect and was no longer a match for either the British or French navies. The Batavian Navy and navy of the Kingdom of Holland played an active role in the French Revolutionary and Napoleonic Wars, though both were repeatedly yoked to French interests.

Officially formed in 1813 after the Sovereign Principality of the United Netherlands was established, the Royal Netherlands Navy played an important role in protecting the Dutch East Indies, and would play a minor role in World War II, where it fought against the Imperial Japanese Navy. Since World War II, the Royal Netherlands Navy has taken part in several peacekeeping missions, and frequently participates in European Union and NATO operations and exercises.

== Ship prefixes ==
The international prefix for ships of the Royal Netherlands Navy is HNLMS (His/Her Netherlands Majesty's Ship). The Netherlands navy itself uses the prefixes Zr.Ms. (Dutch: Zijner Majesteits, lit. 'His Majesty's') when a King is on the throne, and Hr.Ms. (Dutch: Harer Majesteits, lit. 'Her Majesty's') when there is a Queen. Changes happen automatically at the end of a monarch's reign.

== History ==
The modern Netherlands Navy dates its founding to a "statute of admiralty" issued by Maximilian, King of the Romans (future Holy Roman Emperor Maximilian I), and his son Philip the Fair, the ruler of Burgundian lands (a minor at that time) on 8 January 1488. (Note: This is also the date accepted by Wragg. Richard Ernest Dupuy and Trevor Nevitt Dupuy consider this as the founding date of the administrative foundations of the Dutch navy. Sicking opines that the 1488 Ordinance marked a departure point from previous policies by establishing a centralized structure, although the objectives of the Ordinance initially could not be carried out because of strong opposition and unfavourable political climate (for example, the first central Admiral, Philip of Cleves, sided with the rebels against Maximilian since 1488). The situation improved with the appointment of Philip of Burgundy-Beveren in 1491, and especially since the tenures of Adolf and Maximilian of Burgundy. A true permanent central navy only emerged after the 1550-1555 period, under the governorship of Mary of Hungary, with Cornelis de Schepper also playing a major role. Jaap R. Bruijn traces the origins of an independent Dutch navy to the early stages of the Eighty Years' War (1568–1648) while the formation of a "national" navy is dated to the establishment of the Dutch Republic in 1597.)

=== Netherlands Golden Age ===
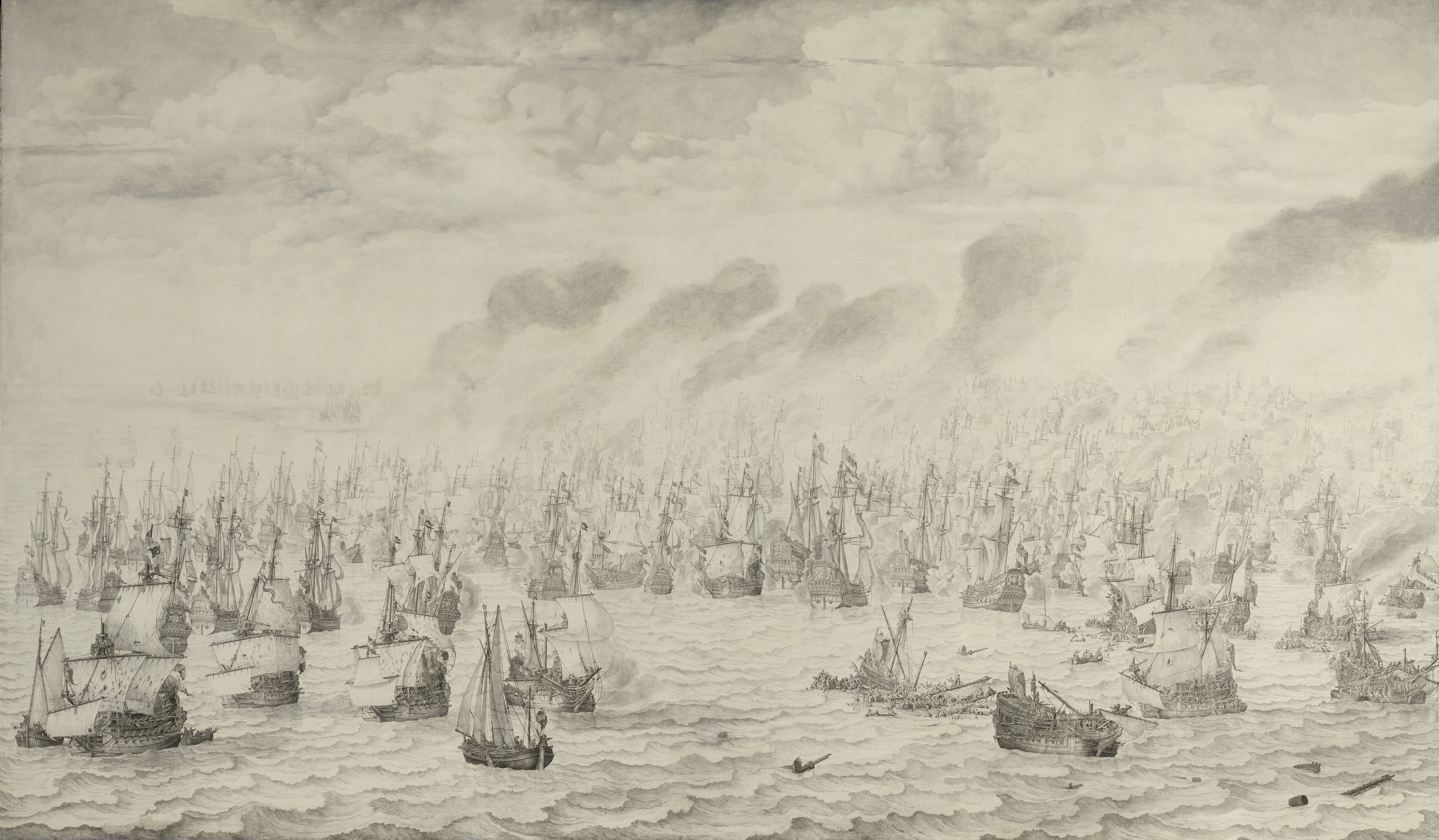
The Battle of Scheveningen in 1653 during the First Anglo-Dutch War.

The Netherlands navy was involved in several wars against other European powers from the late 16th century, initially for independence against Spain in European waters, later for shipping lanes, trade and colonies in many parts of the world, notably during the Anglo-Dutch Wars. During the 17th century the Dutch States Navy was one of the most powerful navies in the world. As an organization, the Dutch navy consisted of five separate admiralties (three of them in Holland, and one each in Friesland and Zeeland), each with its own ships, personnel, shipyards, command structures and revenues.

=== World War II ===
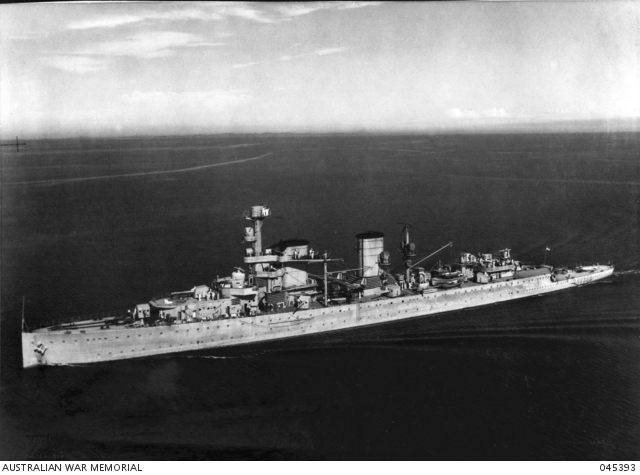
HNLMS Java, ca. 1941.

Elements of the Royal Netherlands Navy on manoeuvres, 1936.

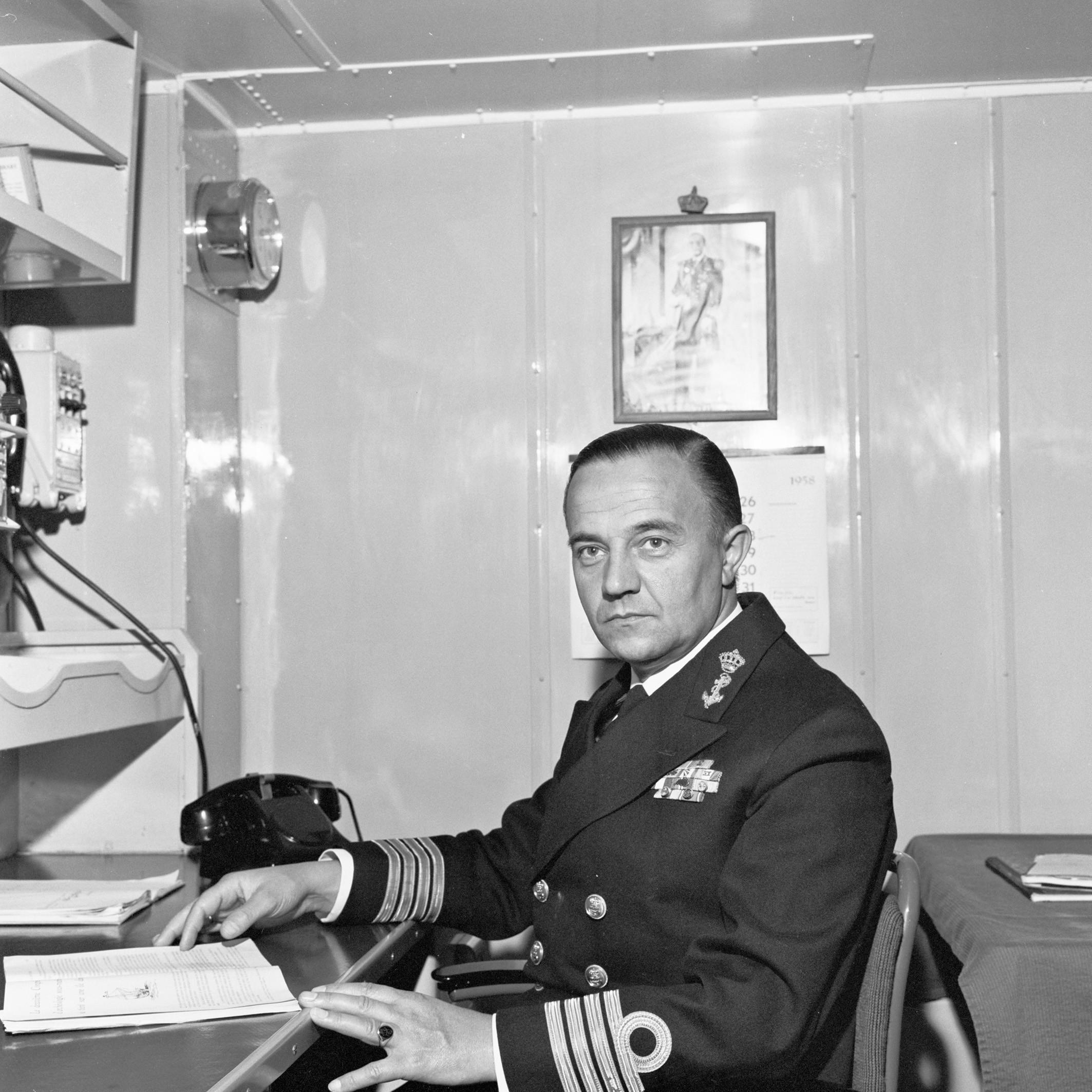
Piet de Jong, commanding officer of HNLMS Gelderland in 1958.

At the start of WWII the Dutch had five cruisers, eight destroyers, 24 submarines, and smaller vessels, along with 50 aircraft. The Netherlands was conquered in 1940 by Nazi Germany in a matter of days, and two Dutch light cruisers and one destroyer leader and three destroyers that were under construction were captured in their shipyard.

For the rest of the war, the Dutch navy was based in Allied countries: the Dutch navy had its headquarters in London, and smaller units in Ceylon (modern day Sri Lanka) and Western Australia. Around the world Dutch naval units were responsible for transporting troops, for example during Operation Dynamo at Dunkirk and on D-Day, they escorted convoys and attacked enemy targets. Dutch submarines scored some victories, including one on a Kriegsmarine U-boat U-95 in the Mediterranean Sea, which was sunk by O 21, but during the war the Dutch Navy suffered heavy losses, particularly in the Pacific Theatre.

A small force of submarines based in Western Australia sank more Japanese ships in the first weeks after Japan joined the war than the entire British and American navies together during the same period, an exploit which earned Admiral Helfrich the nickname "Ship-a-day Helfrich". The aggressive pace of operations against the Japanese was a contributing factor to both the heavy losses sustained and the greater number of successes scored as compared to the British and Americans in the region.

But during the relentless Japanese offensive of February through April 1942 in the Dutch East Indies, the Dutch navy in Asia was virtually annihilated, particularly in the Battle of the Java Sea (27 February 1942) in which the commander, Karel Doorman, went down with his fleet along with 1,000 sailors. The Navy sustained losses of a total of 20 ships (including two of its three light cruisers) and 2,500 sailors killed in the course of the campaign. The Dutch navy had suffered from years of underfunding and came ill-prepared to face an enemy with more and heavier ships with better weapons, including the Long Lance-torpedo, with which the cruiser Haguro sank the light cruiser HNLMS De Ruyter.

=== Decolonization ===
After the war, relations between the Netherlands and its colonial empire changed dramatically. The establishment of the Republic of Indonesia, two days after the Japanese surrender, thwarted Dutch plans for restoring colonial authority. The navy made a modest contribution to the Dutch police actions and after four years of conflict, the Netherlands ceded sovereignty to Indonesia in 1949.

Elements of the Dutch navy remained stationed in Indonesia for the Dutch Military Mission until 1954 and in Dutch New Guinea until the New York Agreement came into effect in 1962. The latter had been preceded by a combined Soviet–Indonesian military operation, which the Dutch navy successfully repulsed in the Battle of Arafura Sea.

The Dutch departure from Southeast Asia had immediate consequences for the purpose of the navy, as its focus shifted to anti-submarine warfare and securing shipping lanes in a joint European and North Atlantic context.

=== European Union cooperation ===
The Navy has participated in joint European Union naval operations and exercises. Ten separate Dutch vessels have contributed to the EU Naval Force Operation Atalanta, combating Somali piracy forces in the Gulf of Aden, Arabian Sea, and Indian Ocean since 2009. The last vessel was sent in 2018; since then the Navy has only contributed staff and advisors to the mission.

=== NATO cooperation ===
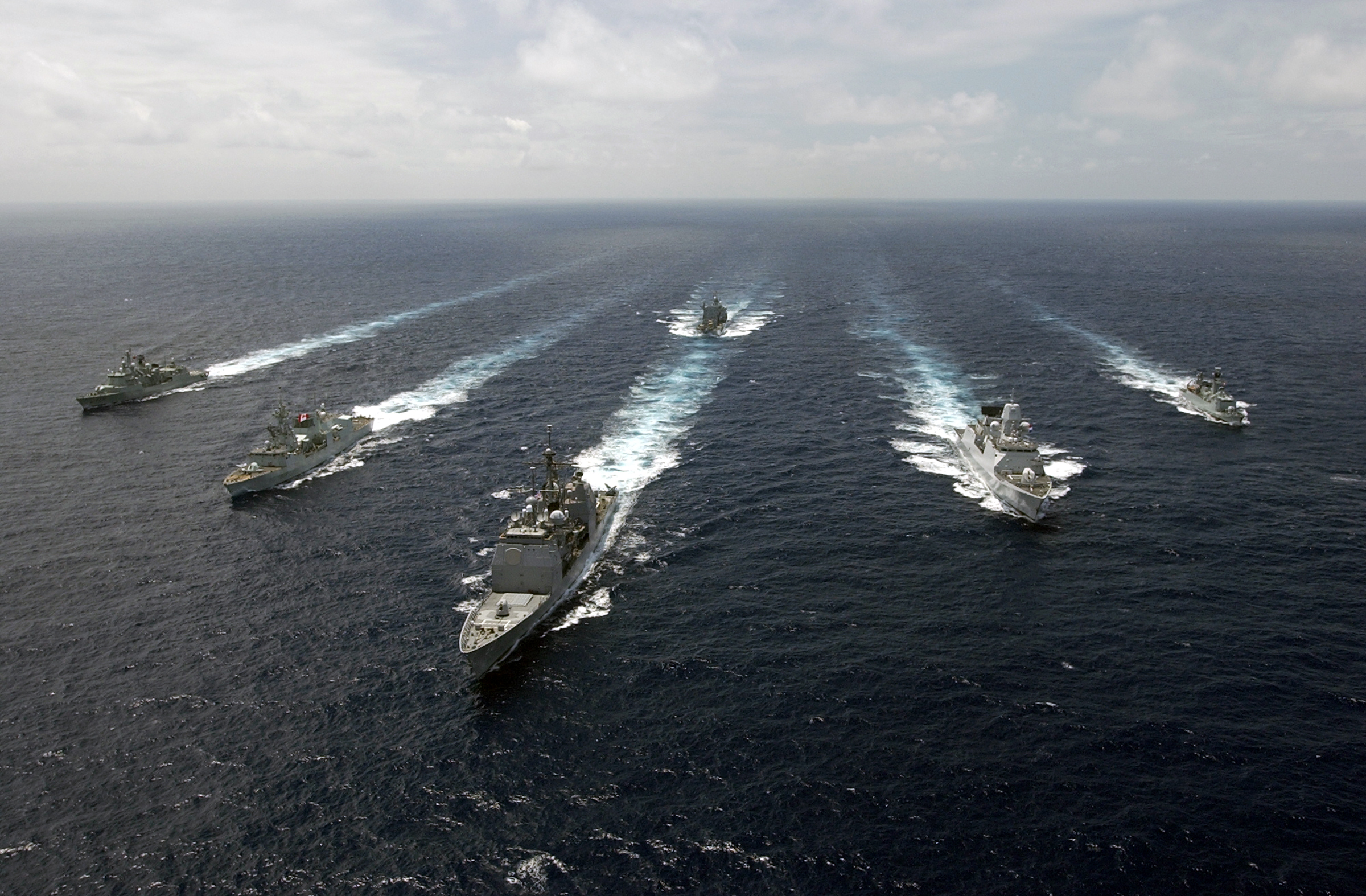
Standing NATO Maritime Group 1 in 2007 with HNLMS Evertsen second from the right.

With the creation of the North Atlantic Treaty Organization, the military focus was on the army and air force; it was not until the Korean War (1950–1953) that the navy got more recognition. The government allowed the creation of a balanced fleet consisting of two naval squadrons. Apart from the aircraft carrier HNLMS Karel Doorman the Dutch navy consisted of two light cruisers (two De Zeven Provinciën class), 12 destroyers (four Holland class, eight Friesland class), eight submarines, six frigates (van Speijk-class frigates), and a considerable number of minesweepers.

As a member of NATO, the Netherlands developed its security policy in close cooperation with other members. The establishment of the Warsaw Pact in 1955 intensified the arms race between West and East. Technical innovations rapidly emerged, the introduction of radar and sonar were followed by nuclear weapon systems and long-range missiles. The geopolitical situation allowed for a fixed military strategy. Beginning in 1965, the Dutch Navy joined certain permanent NATO squadrons like the Standing Naval Force Atlantic.

== Structure ==
The constituent parts of the Royal Netherlands Navy are:

=== Naval squadron ===
Contains all surface combatants, replenishment ships, and amphibious support ships.

=== Submarine service ===
Houses the submarines and a support vessel.

=== Mine Detection and Clearing Service ===
Contains various minehunters.

=== Hydrographic Service ===
The Hydrographic Service is responsible for relevant hydrographic surveys.

=== Social Medical Service ===
Provides healthcare to personnel of the Royal Netherlands Navy.

=== Directorate of Materiel Sustainment ===
The Directorate of Materiel Sustainment is responsible for the maintenance of ships, submarines and systems.

=== Naval aviation ===
Two squadrons equipped with NH90 NFH helicopters based at De Kooy Airfield.

=== Netherlands Marine Corps ===
- Two Marine Combat Groups (1 MCG and 2 MCG)
- One Maritime Special Operations Force (NLMARSOF)
- One Surface Assault and Training Group (SATG)
- One Seabased Support Group (SSG)
- 32 Raiding Squadron (permanently stationed at Aruba)
- Rotterdam Marine Band of the Royal Netherlands Navy

=== Dutch Caribbean Naval Command ===
Command of the Royal Netherlands Navy that is responsible for national defense and international law enforcement in the Dutch Caribbean.

=== Netherlands and Dutch Caribbean Coastguard ===
Although the Netherlands Coastguard is not an official part of the Navy, it is under its operational control. Also the Dutch Caribbean Coast Guard is under the operational control of the Navy and is commanded by the commander of the Navy in the Caribbean.

Coastguard aircraft
Aircraft	Origin	Type	Coastguard base	In service	Notes
Bombardier Dash 8 MPA	Canada	Patrol / SAR	Schiphol - The Netherlands	2	
Bombardier Dash 8 MPA	Canada	Patrol / SAR	HATO - Curaçao Dutch Caribbean	2	
AgustaWestland AW169	Italy	SAR / Transport	HATO - Curaçao Dutch Caribbean	2	
AgustaWestland AW189	Italy	SAR	Den Helder & Midden Zeeland - The Netherlands	3	Operated by Bristow Helicopters.

== Bases ==
The main naval base, Nieuwe Haven Naval Base is situated in Den Helder, North Holland. Secondary bases are situated around Den Helder, as well as in Amsterdam, and Willemstad on the Caribbean island of Curaçao, Usage rights are also in place for port facilities in Rotterdam, Vlissingen and Eemshaven. The Netherlands Marine Corps has barracks in Rotterdam, Doorn, Texel and Den Helder, as well as in the Caribbean at Suffisant on Curaçao, and Savaneta on Aruba. There is also Pointe Blanche Naval Support Point in Sint Maarten.

== Officer training ==
Officers of the Nederland Navy are trained at the Royal Naval Institute (Koninklijk Instituut voor de Marine), which is part of the Netherlands defence academy (Nederlandse Defensie Academie) in Den Helder. Around 100-120 people start training every year.

== Ships of the Royal Netherlands Navy ==
=== Ships ===
The Royal Netherlands Navy currently operates 7 main classes of vessels: Note: in the Royal Netherlands Navy frigates are interchangeable with destroyers as there is no separate class

Type ship	Defence White Paper 1974	Defence White Paper 1984	Priority Document 1993	Navy study 2005	Economize 2011	Defence White Paper 2018
LC frigates				4	4	4
M frigates	4	8	8	2	2	2
GW frigates	2	2	2			
L frigates	1	2	2			
S frigates	12	10	6			
MLM frigates	6					
Frigates	25	22	18	6	6	6
Patrol ships				4	4	4
Submarine	6	6	4	4	4	4
Supply ships	2	2	2	1		1
LPD			1	2	2	2
JSS				1	1	1
Minehunters	15	15	15	10	6	6
Minesweepers	11	11				
Total ships	59	56	40	28	23	24
LRMP aircraft	21	13	13			
Helicopters	36	30	20	20	20	20
Total aircraft	57	43	33	20	20	20

The Royal Netherlands Navy classifies the De Zeven Provinciën-class as frigates, but internationally they are most comparable to destroyers (due to their size and weapon capability) platform for Sea Based Anti-Ballistic Missile defence

=== Inventory ===
In 2026 the fleet of the Royal Netherlands Navy consists of these ships:
Class	Photo	Type	Number	Dates	Details
Walrus class		Attack submarine	3	1990	Multi-purpose diesel-electric powered hunter-killer submarines for deep ocean, brown water & special forces operations. SLEP 2015-2019, two being phased out early (Walrus decommissioned in 2023); entire class to be replaced by 4 new subs starting in 2034.
De Zeven Provinciën class		Frigate	4	2002	Mainly anti-air warfare with BMD capability with extensive command & communication facilities, being upgraded.
Karel Doorman class		Frigate	2	1991	8 initially built for the Royal Netherlands Navy, pairs of ships subsequently sold to the Belgian, Portuguese and Chilean navies. Belgian and Dutch M-Class frigates received extensive upgrades such as an extended helicopter deck and new advanced sensors and improvements in stealthiness. Will be replaced in Dutch- & Belgian Navy in 2028-2030.
Holland class		Offshore patrol vessel	4	2012	Ocean patrols.
Galatea		Patrol vessel	1	2025	Temporarily leased from Damen by the Dutch Ministry of Defence and will be used by the RNLN until the Multifunctional Support Ships enter service in 2027.
Alkmaar class		Minehunter	3	1983	Originally a class of 15 ships, will be replaced starting 2025. 2 donated to the Ukrainian Navy in 2024 and 2025. 3 will be donated to the Bulgarian Navy in 2027-2028.
Zr.Ms. Den Helder		Replenishment oiler	1	2025	Fleet replenishment ship.
Karel Doorman class		Joint logistic support ship	1	2014	Combined amphibious operations/seabased helicopter platform & fleet replenishing, capable of supporting AH-64E / CH-47F / NH90 NFH operations.
Rotterdam class		Landing platform dock	2	1998	Troop & equipment transport, helicopter platform with command & communication & hospital facilities.
Mk.II (NL) class		Landing craft utility	5	2005	L9528 converted to Mk.III standards, rest to follow.
Mk.V C (NL) class		Landing craft vehicle personnel	12	2008	Will be replaced from 2025 onwards with 12 new LCVP's and 8 larger Littoral Craft Mobility (LCM).
Hydrograaf		Expeditionary survey boat	1	2021	Carried in a davit on board a Rotterdam-class landing platform dock or HNLMS Karel Doorman to its work area.
Pelikaan class		Multi-purpose logistic support vessel	1	2006	Multi-purpose logistic & amphibious support vessel based in Dutch Caribbean, will be replaced in 2030.
Snellius class		Hydrographic survey vessel	2	2003	Multi-purpose hydrographic survey vessels, will be replaced in 2030.
Mercuur class		Submarine support vessel	1	1987	Submarine support vessel & MCM command, upgraded in 2017 and will be replaced in 2028.
Cerberus class		Diving support vessel	4	1992	Multi-purpose diving support vessels & harbour protection, will be replaced by 2026.
Soemba class		Diving support vessel	1	1989	Diving training- & support vessel, will be replaced 2026.
Van Kinsbergen training ship		Training ship	1	1999	Training ship, will be replaced in 2026.
Urania		Training ship	1	2004	Sailing naval training ship.
Geosea		Mine countermeasures vessel	1	2020	Civilian ship that the RNLN leased from the company N-Sea to test, and make personnel familiar with, components of the new Mine Countermeasures-toolbox that will be used on the future Vlissingen class.
Strategic transport		Roll-on/roll-off	2	2022	Two civilian ships leased for 10 years to provide Strategic Sealift Capability for the Dutch military, the MV New Amsterdam (2022) & MV Southern Rock (2024).
Damen Stan Patrol 2005		Patrol / Training	3	2014	Multifunctional ships.
Noorderhaaks class		Harbour patrol boat	2	2015	Used primarily to patrol the Nieuwe Haven Naval Base and its surroundings.
Noordzee class		Coastal / Harbour tug	3	2016	Damen ASD2810 Hybrid.
Linge class		Coastal / Harbour tug	1	1997	Gouwe commissioned a decade later after the rest of the class.
Bolder class		Harbour tug	3	2023	Replaced the Schelde class tugs.
Breezand class		Harbour tug	2	1989	Also known in Dutch as the Werf class.

The total tonnage will be approx. 140,000 tonnes. Next to these ships a lot of other smaller vessels remain in the navy.

With these changes the Royal Netherlands Navy will have 10 large oceangoing vessels ranging from medium/low to high combat action ships. The renewed Dutch Navy will be a green-water navy, having enough frigates and auxiliaries to operate far out at sea, while depending on land-based air support, and, with the large amphibious squadron, they will have significant brown-water navy capabilities.

== Other equipment of the Royal Netherlands Navy ==
=== Naval aviation - Maritime helicopters ===
Royal Netherlands Navy NH90 NFH at De Kooy Naval Air Station.

- 19 NH90, 11 NATO Frigate Helicopter (NFH) and eight transport version of the NATO Frigate Helicopter (TNFH) for Marine Corps Air Lift Helicopter Squadron. One NFH was lost on 19 July 2020 as result of a crash in the Caribbean Sea near the island of Aruba, killing two of the four crew on board.

In 2025 3 additional NH90 ASW helicopters were ordered with an option for 2 extra, to supplement the current inventory and increase availability.

Since the retirement of the Westland Lynx, the Royal Netherlands Air Force fills the gap of the Lynx's amphibious task with Airbus AS-532U2 Cougar helicopters. The Cougar's main task is to support the Royal Netherlands Marine Corps on board of the LPD's and JSS. Other tasks are to provide Medical air transport to and from these ships, but also support SOF units in amphibious missions and trainings.

In 2012 an AH-64D Apache attack helicopter from the Royal Netherlands Air Force made a deck landing on board HNLMS Rotterdam for the first time as part of an initial study into the possibilities for wider use of the helicopters as these will be upgraded to the AH-64E standard which has specific features for maritime operations.

The Dutch amphibious support ship HNLMS Johan de Witt and the JSS HNLMS Karel Doorman are designed to handle Royal Netherlands Air Force CH-47F Chinook helicopters but still require additional anti corrosion measures (part of the ongoing upgrade of the CH-47F).

=== Drones ===
Name	Origin	Type	Number	Photo	Notes
UMS Skeldar V-200	Sweden	ISR	1		10 ordered for new MCM vessels
V-BAT	United States	VTOL UAV	12		
Airboxer	Netherlands	VTOL UAV			On 14 May 2024 it was reported that High Eye will deliver its Airboxer VTOL UAV to the Dutch navy.
Seafox	Germany	UUV			
REMUS	United States	AUV			
K-Ster C	France	UUV			
Blueye ROV	Norway	ROV			

=== Vehicles ===
Name	Photo	Origin	Type	Number	Notes
Scania P380 4x2	—	Sweden	Fire engines	4	
Scania P500 B10×4 6NA		Finland Sweden	Firefighting truck	1	Equipped with Bronto RPX 61 superstructure to reach 61m height.
DAF CF410 FAN 6×2	—	Netherlands	Swap body vehicle with crane for Dutch marines firefighters	3	

== Future changes ==
In April 2018, the Dutch Government approved a multi-year investment programme and allocated funds for the 2018–2030 period, including:

- The Walrus-class submarines replacement with new boats planned for initial service entry in 2034. The subs are currently undergoing a Service-life Extension Programme (SLEP), including new sonar, new optronic periscope and weapon upgrades for near shore operations. The Royal Dutch Navy is evaluating Saab/Damen (A-26), TKMS (Upgraded 212), Navantia S-80 and a Naval Group (SSK version of Barracuda) proposal. In 2019 the S-80 option was dropped, originally with plans to place an order for the winning design in 2022 and having the first boat in service in 2028 and the first two by 2031. However, in October 2021 it was reported that this timeline was no longer feasible. Instead, the Dutch Ministry of Defence signalled that the envisaged dates would have to be "substantially adjusted". In April 2022 it was announced that the revised schedule for the construction of the new replacement boats would likely see the first two replacement vessels entering service in the 2034 to 2037 timeframe. On 15 March 2024 State Secretary for Defence Christophe van der Maat officially announced that Naval Group has been selected as the winning bid.
- Upgrading the De Zeven Provinciën-class LCF frigates Theatre Ballistic Missile Defense, acquisition of RIM-161 Standard Missile 3 (SM-3), a new OtoMelara 127/64 LW canon, ESSM-2 and SLCM BGM-109 Tomahawk and expanding the Mk41 VLS with an additional 8 cell unit.
- Acquisition of initially two Multifunctional Support Ships to supplement existing LCF Frigates with extra container based AAW Barak-ER missiles and IAI Harop loitering munition in support of amphibious forces.
- Replacement of the Karel Doorman-class M frigates in the 2028/2030 period by 4 ships(plus another 2 for the Belgian Navy), designed & built by Damen Shipyards. See Future Surface Combatant for more information.
- Replacement of the 6 Alkmaar-class MCM ships from 2025 including MCM Drones. 6 units each will be built for both the Belgian and Dutch navies for a total of 12 ships. The contract was won by Naval Group on 15 March 2019 for the construction of 12 City-class mine countermeasures vessels.
- Increasing the size of the Royal Netherlands Marine Corps to remain highly integrated with the British Royal Marines. In 2017 the Ministry of Defence announced the formation of a Fleet Marine Squadron for the protection of merchant ships.
- In June 2023, the British and Dutch governments announced that the two countries would "explore opportunities" to jointly develop new specialist amphibious warships which for the Royal Netherlands Navy would likely replace the Rotterdam-class landing platform docks.
- The German Navy Seebatallion (Marines) will be integrated into the Royal Netherlands Marine Corps.
- Cooperation with the German Navy regarding Submarine & Amphibious Operations.
- Replacement of Zr.Ms. Mercuur, Zr.Ms. Pelikaan, the four diving support vessels, the diving training vessel Zr.Ms. Soemba, the hydrographic vessels Zr.Ms. Snellius en Zr.Ms. Luymes and the training vessel Van Kinsbergen from 2024 onwards.
- Acquisition of new landing craft from 2025 with additional capacity to support amphibious operations and the integration of the German Navy Marines (Seebatallion). In March 2023, a report to the Dutch Parliament outlined a plan for 12 Littoral Assault Craft (LAC) and 8 Littoral Craft Mobility (LCM) to replace the 12 existing light landing craft (Landing Craft Vehicles and Personnel - LCVP) and improve on their capability.
- Main Naval Ship Based Weapons will be replaced by acquiring ESSM-2, new 127mm canons, Harpoon ASuW replacement, SM-3, SM-2 IIIC SAM, Goalkeeper CIWS replacement, MK 46 & MK 48 Torpedo replacement and SLCM.

=== Theater ballistic missile defence ===
Together with the United States and several other NATO members, the Dutch Navy is testing and updating its ships for Tactical ballistic missile defense capability. Although tests conducted concerning the capability of the APAR (Active Phased Array Radar) have been very successful, in 2018 the Dutch Government approved plans to acquire the SM-3 missiles for integration into the existing weapon suite of the LCF frigates. The four LCF ships will be fitted out with eight SM-3 missiles each (they are provisioned for this VLS extension) through Foreign Military Sales (under discussion between the US and The Netherlands).

== Historic ships ==
- Several ships by the name of HNLMS De Ruyter
- Several ships by the name of HNLMS Tromp
- Delft, 18th century fourth rate ship of the line
- De Zeven Provinciën, 17th century ship of the line and flagship of Michiel de Ruyter
- HNLMS Koning der Nederlanden, the navy's largest warship in the 19th century
- HNLMS Prins Hendrik der Nederlanden, ironclad from the 1860s
- Hr.Ms. Karel Doorman (1943)
- Hr.Ms. Karel Doorman (1944)

Surviving historic ships

- HNLMS Bonaire
- HNLMS Buffel
- HNLMS Schorpioen
- HNLMS Onverschrokken
- HNLMS Abraham Crijnssen

== Ranks and insignia ==
Officers
NATO code	OF-10	OF-9	OF-8	OF-7	OF-6	OF-5	OF-4	OF-3	OF-2	OF-1
Royal Netherlands Navy
Royal Netherlands Navy		Luitenant-Admiraal	Vice-Admiraal	Schout-bij-Nacht	Commandeur	Kapitein ter zee	Kapitein-luitenant ter zee	Luitenant ter zee der 1^{ste} klasse	Luitenant ter zee der 2^{de} klasse oudste categorie	Luitenant ter zee der 2^{de} klasse	Luitenant ter zee der 3^{de} klasse
Abbreviation (stnd)		LAdm	VAdm	SBN	Cdr	KTZ	KLTZ	LTZ1	LTZ2OC	LTZ2	LTZ3	SgtADB	KplADB	ADB

Enlisted ranks
NATO code	OR-9	OR-8	OR-7	OR-6	OR-5	OR-4	OR-3	OR-2		OR-1
Royal Netherlands Navy										No insignia
Royal Netherlands Navy	Adjudant-onderofficier/ Opperschipper		Sergeant-majoor/ Schipper	Sergeant/ Bootsman		Korporaal/ Kwartiermeester		Matroos der 1e klasse	Matroos der 2e klasse	Matroos der 3e klasse

=== Royal insignia ===
Insignia worn by the Monarch of the Netherlands when wearing the uniform of the Royal Netherlands Navy.

Royal Netherlands Navy	Koning der Nederlanden

== See also ==
- Government Navy
- Indies Military Navy
