= HNLMS Snellius =

HNLMS Snellius (Dutch: Hr.Ms. or Zr.Ms. Snellius) may refer to the following ships of the Royal Netherlands Navy that have been named after Willebrord Snellius:

- HNLMS Snellius (1950), was the lead ship of her class of hydrographic survey vessels
- HNLMS Snellius (A802), a Snellius-class hydrographic survey vessel
