= HNLMS Urania =

At least two ships of the Royal Netherlands Navy have been named HNLMS Urania after Urania, the muse of astronomy in Greek mythology:

- HNLMS Urania (1928), was a training ship of the Royal Netherlands Navy, served from 1938 to 2001.
- HNLMS Urania (1941), was a training ship of the Royal Netherlands Navy in the Dutch East Indies, served from 1941 to 1942.
- HNLMS Urania (2004), is a training ship of the Royal Netherlands Navy, entered service in 2004.
