= HNLMS Luymes =

HNLMS Luymes (Dutch: Hr.Ms. or Zr.Ms. Luymes) may refer to the following ships of the Royal Netherlands Navy:

- HNLMS Luymes (1951), was a Snellius-class hydrographic survey vessel that was later rebuilt as a yacht
- HNLMS Luymes (A803), a Snellius-class hydrographic survey vessel
