= HNLMS Blommendal =

Naval ship built in 1973

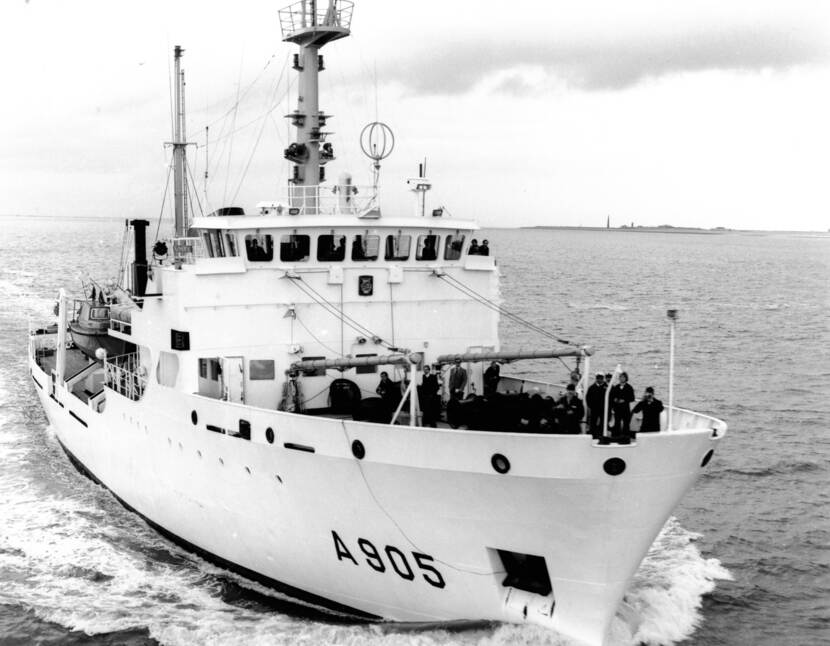
- HNLMS Blommendal

History

Netherlands
- Name: Blommendal
- Namesake: Antonie Rudolphus Blommendal
- Builder: Boele's Scheepwerven en Machinefabriek B.V., Bolnes
- Laid down: 1 August 1972
- Launched: 21 November 1972
- Commissioned: 22 May 1973
- Decommissioned: 15 December 1999
- Identification: Hull number: A905
- Fate: Scrapped in 2016

General characteristics
- Type: Buyskes-class hydrographic survey vessel
- Displacement: 1,033 t (1,017 long tons)
- Length: 59.50 m (195 ft 3 in)
- Beam: 11.20 m (36 ft 9 in)
- Draught: 3.70 metres (12 ft 2 in)
- Installed power: 1,400 hp (1,000 kW)
- Propulsion: 1 propeller; 3 Paxman diesel engines
- Speed: 13.5 knots (25.0 km/h; 15.5 mph)
- Crew: 43

HNLMS Blommendal (A905) is a former hydrographic survey vessel of the Royal Netherlands Navy.

== History ==
Blommendal was built by Boele's Scheepwerven en Machinefabriek B.V. located at Bolnes in 1973, and named for the first chef of the Dienst der Hydrografie, Antonie Rudolphus Blommendal.

Blommendal was laid up for years near Amsterdam until she was finally scrapped in 2016 at Treffers Shiprecycling BV in Haarlem.

Her sister ship Buyskes was sold to the Latvian Navy in 2004.
