= Royal IHC =

Dutch shipbuilding company

Royal IHC (IHC Holland)
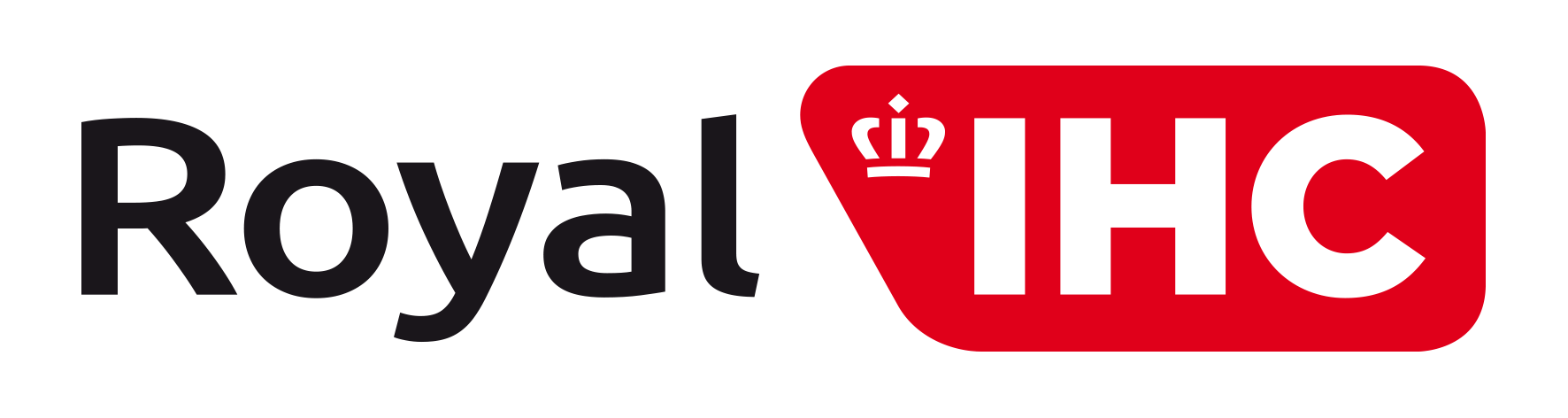

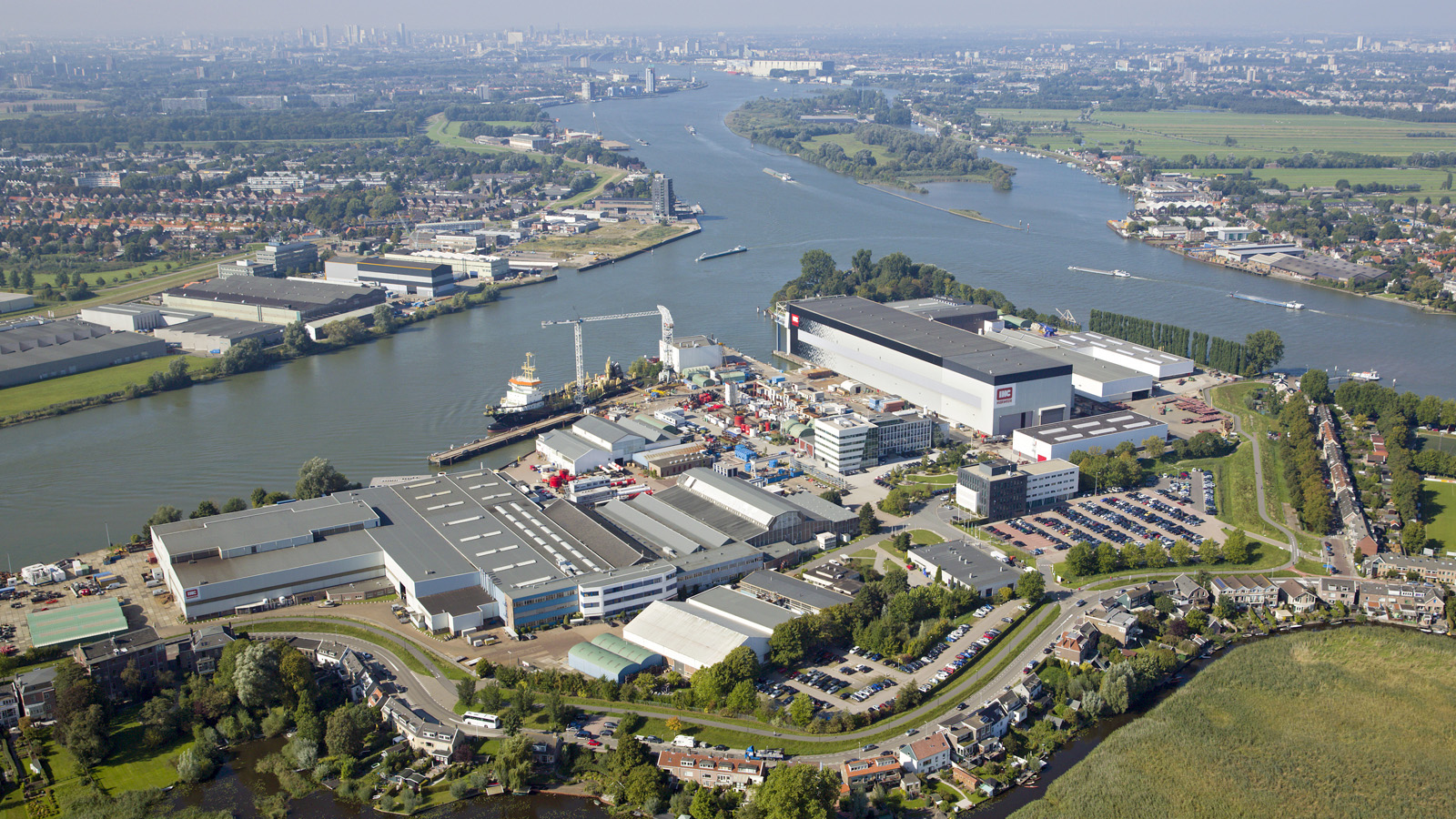
- Shipyard of Royal IHC in Kinderdijk in 2017
- Company type: Private
- Headquarters: Smitweg 6; 2961 AW Kinderdijk
- Revenue: €1,070 million (2019)
- Net income: €-226.8 million (2019)
- Number of employees: 3,535 (2019)
- Website: Royal IHC

Royal IHC or Koninklijke IHC, previously IHC Holland (1943–1995), IHC Holland Merwede (1995–2005) and IHC Merwede (2005–2014) is a Dutch shipbuilding company with headquarters in Kinderdijk. It focuses on the development, design and construction of ships for the dredging and offshore industries.

== IHC Holland partnership (1943–1965) ==
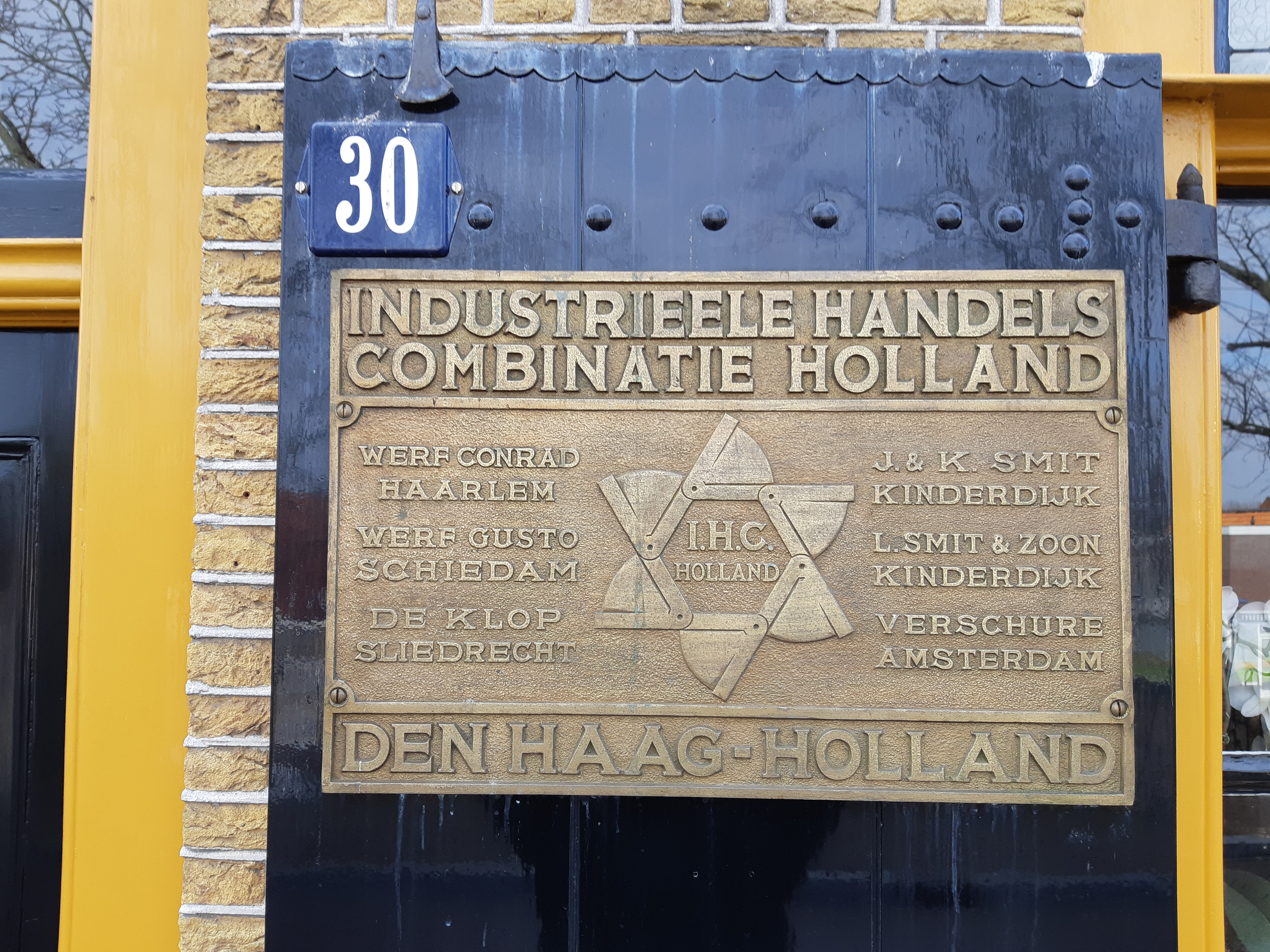
Shipyard sign of Industriële Handels Combinatie Holland

The Industriële Handels Combinatie (IHC) in the Hague was a partnership. The idea came up when the Billiton company made plans for tin mining after the war, and a number of shipyards each deemed themselves incapable to build the required vessels on their own after the war. The partnership consisted of 6 small companies which were all strong players in dredging, but wanted to be more efficient. In sales e.g. it was very inefficient for all these relatively small companies to have their own agents abroad. The partnership consisted of:

- Conrad Shipyard in Haarlem
- Gusto Shipyard in Schiedam
- Machine Factory De Klop in Sliedrecht
- J. & K. Smit in Kinderdijk
- L. Smit en Zoon in Kinderdijk
- Verschure & Co's in Amsterdam.

Already in July 1945, an order for 6 tin bucket dredgers came in from the Billiton Company. The order would be built by a consortium of Gusto, Conrad, Stork Hijs and Verschure & Co. under leadership of J. & K. Smit. In December 1946 IHC contracted with Turkey for 6 twin screw passenger ships. In September 1947 IHC got a French order for five big dredgers.

In the 1950s IHC contracted for many dredging vessels. In 1952 it also contracted for 5 reefer ships. In this order, Verschure & Co. and De Klop each built two ships, and J. & K. Smit only one. The engines would be built by Werkspoor and De Schelde. In 1956 IHC got an order for a cutting suction dredger to dig for bauxite in Suriname. The floating sheerleg Simson is now in the Maritime Museum Rotterdam it was built by a combination of shipyards. De Hoop in Hardinxveld would build the pontoon. Kloos en Zn. N.V. built the superstructure, and J. & K. Smit made the steam engines, tools and other machinery.

In 1960 IHC delivered a special dredger. It was a rock breaker / spoon dredger built for the Suez Canal by J. & K. Smit. It could fix itself by using studs. It would then use a 22,500 kg digging bar to break rock formations. The 4.5 m^{3} spoon would then pick up the fragments.

== Public company IHC Holland (1965–1978) ==
=== Foundation ===
In 1965 the boards of 5 of the 6 companies which cooperated in IHC Holland decided to merge their companies. Conrad Shipyard en Stork Hijsch N.V. could not join, because it was part of the Stork conglomerate.

=== Merger of J. & K. Smit and L. Smit ===
In 1966 IHC Holland started to merge J. &. K. Smit and L. Smit shipyards into a partnership known as Smit Kinderdijk v.o.f. In 1971 Smit Kinderdijk became IHC Smit N.V.

=== SBM Offshore and the Single Buoy Mooring ===
The single buoy mooring was an idea by Shell. It would lead to the establishment of a daughter company called Single Buoy Mooring, the nucleus of the later SBM Offshore. Gusto shipyard started production of SBMs in the late 1950s with technical assistance by Shell. SBMs became a very successful product of Gusto in the 1960s. However, during installation the builder Gusto often had to call on operator Shell for assistance. In order to solve this Robert Smulders (from the Gusto family) founded a new IHC daughter company on 27 February 1969. SBM Inc., in Fribourg, Switzerland, would specialize in SBMs. It would do marketing and sales, delivery, training of operator staff, after sales, and ideas for new products.

=== Offshore specialists Gusto Schiedam and Gusto Staalbouw (Slikkerveer) ===
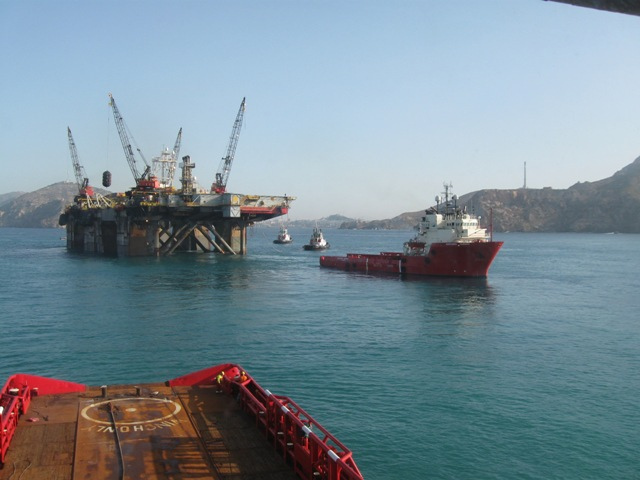
Castoro 7 ex-Viking Piper

From the mid-1960s Gusto Schiedam would focus on offshore products like Drillships and Oil Platforms. It also built Pipe-laying ships like the massive Castoro 7. A project that was a bit too big for a medium-sized shipbuilder.

The construction shop / shipyard Gusto Staalbouw (Slikkerveer) was founded on 1 October 1973 as a separate company called IHC Gusto Staalbouw BV. The reasons to do this were thought to be in the wage differences between steelworkers and shipbuilders. Gusto Staalbouw first moved to Sliedrecht, and then to Slikkerveer in 1975, where it replaced the local Gusto shipyard. Gusto Staalbouw built a number of offshore products like jackup rigs, but also the single buoy mooring, which was fundamental for the growth of SBM.

=== IHC is reorganized ===
By 1975 the Dutch shipbuilding industry was in deep trouble. IHC had three main activities: Construction of dredging vessels, Construction of Offshore material, and Offshore activities and services. The huge conglomerate Rijn-Schelde-Verolme built warships and supertankers, but it was clear that the market for supertankers would not recover in the foreseeable future. The Dutch government was prepared to help, but only if the shipbuilders would start to cooperate with each other, and capacity was reduced. In January 1977 a commission finally advised the government on how to reorganize shipbuilding. In August 1977 the shipbuilders RSV and IHC, and the labor unions, agreed to shut down IHC Holland's Gusto Shipyard of 1,200 men, as well as construction at P. Smit and RDM. In parallel with these closures, a 350 million guilder modernization plan was designed. E.g. much work on the shipyards was still done in the open air, and would be brought indoors.

=== The end of Gusto Schiedam ===
By early 1977 the IHC Gusto shipyard in Schiedam was losing a lot of money. In January IHC Holland had accepted orders for dredging material amounting to 210 million guilders. These orders were known to lead to a significant loss, but the alternative was worse. In order to get government permission for collective layoffs, and subsidies for modernization, IHC was therefore prepared to get rid of its shipyard Gusto Schiedam. This shipyard built offshore products for which there was little demand. It also had not yet been modernized, which had taken place at other IHC shipyards. The total cost of closing Gusto shipyard in Schiedam came to 80 million guilders for IHC, while the state paid another 233 million.

To this day there are suspicions about parties scheming to close down the renowned Gusto Shipyard. The closure was probably a combination of the IHC board being prepared to give up an old shipyard that it no longer needed, and RSV having ambitions in the offshore industry. Indeed, while the shipyard was closed down, all its employees got a new contract after the employees of the famous Gusto engineering office agreed to work at RSV in the future. It was an unusual way to reorganize. Furthermore, IHC got 200 million to reorganize its dredging activities, a subsidy that was made conditional on closing Gusto Schiedam. This way IHC Holland ended the construction of large offshore projects.

=== IHC Holland is split ===
What was left of IHC Holland after the closure of Gusto Schiedam was the dredging division, and the offshore activities and services. In Gusto Staalbouw Slikkerveer IHC had also retained part of its offshore construction, notably that of single buoy moorings. The idea to keep Gusto Engineering had failed. The publicly traded company IHC Holland would next be split in three parts:

- Public company IHC Holdings NV, later named Caland Holdings N.V.
- Public company IHC Inter N.V.
- Private company IHC Holland

IHC Holdings NV became the new name of the old public company IHC Holland in October 1978. IHC Holdings then became a 45% shareholder in a new private shipbuilding company called IHC Holland. IHC Holdings NV, the shares of which were traded on the Amsterdam Exchange, was so often confused with IHC Holland, that the name IHC Holdings NV was changed to Caland Holdings NV in October 1979. It would be wrong to think of Caland Holdings primarily as 'parent company' of IHC Holland. In the annual report over 1980 Caland gave its shares in IHC Holland a nil value, but still made a profit of 17.6 million from other sources.

IHC Inter N.V. was a holding split off from IHC Holdings. It became a 60% owner of IHC Inc., the parent of the companies which formed the nucleus of SBM Offshore. Caland Holdings owned the other 40%. IHC Inc. paid a heavy price at the split, but this way its shareholders (via IHC Inter) did not have to fear that IHC Inc. would be bled dry to save the shipyards. IHC Inter and Caland Holdings would merge again in 1984.

== Private company IHC Holland (1978–2021) ==
=== Foundation ===
The foundation of the new private shipbuilding company IHC Holland was part of the large late 1970s reorganization of the Dutch shipbuilding industry. This reorganization was meant to modernize shipbuilding, to increase economies of scale, and to increase cooperation in the sector. IHC's shipbuilding activities would be merged with those of dredging vessel builder Van Rees, and the state would invest via NIBC Bank. The later Caland Holdings would get 46%, NIBC 46% and the Van Rees shareholders 8.5%. The new shipbuilding company would take the name IHC Holland from the old publicly traded company.

=== Closure of IHC Verschure ===
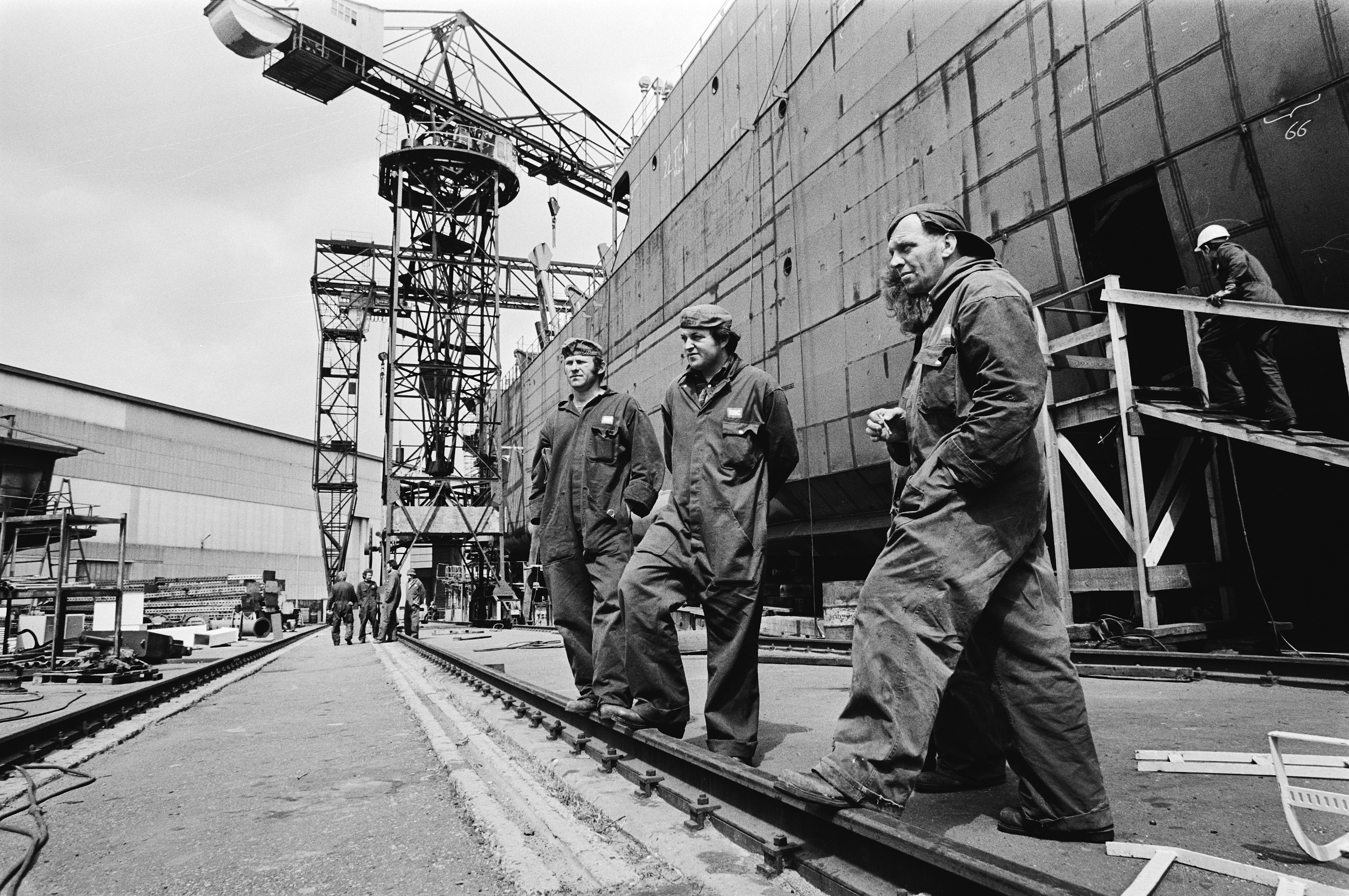
Workers at Verschure in August 1979

In April 1979, only half a year after its foundation, IHC announced that it would have to shrink further. The immediate cause was a missed order for two dredging vessels for Egypt. A generally accepted calculation of the demand for dredging vessels stated that the demand would not exceed 6 vessels a year. The most modern shipyard of IHC, IHC Smit in Kinderdijk, could build 5 a year. At the time IHC had only orders for half a year's work.

In May 1979 it became official that Verschure shipyard in Amsterdam would have to be closed. A general reorganization plan for the sector called for shipbuilding at Verschure to cease, and for reducing capacity at Gusto Staalbouw in Slikkerveer and Geleen. The explanation by IHC for the choice to close Verschure was as follows: It was a shipyard with relatively bad facilities, which led to a high cost price. Modernization would cost 75 million, and even then, the result would be doubtful. By September 1979, the closure of Verschure, which lost 150,000 guilders a day became final. Without closing Verschure, IHC would face a yearly loss of 60 million. By closing down shipbuilding at Verschure, and reducing capacity at Gusto Staalbouw the loss would be limited to 14 million a year.

=== A stake in Gusto Engineering ===
IHC Caland and IHC Holland had always mourned the loss of the Engineering Office of Gusto Schiedam, which designed large offshore vessels and structures like oil platforms. In December 1980, IHC Inter N.V. and IHC Holland each took one third of the shares of Gusto Engineering. In 1984 IHC Caland bought the shares that RSV still had. Gusto Engineering thus became part of IHC Caland, and a part sister of IHC Holland.

=== The 1980s ===
In early 1980 IHC Holland got orders worth about 100 million guilders. While it was still busy laying off white-collar workers, it had about 100 vacancies for technical staff, including designers and order handling. In early July 1980 IHC announced orders for two trailing suction dredgers and four hopper barges worth 90 million. The vessels would be built by IHC Kinderdijk, securing work there almost till the end of 1981. Within a few days these were followed by orders for four Cutter Suction Dredgers, a barge elevator and some other items for 55 million. IHC therefore hoped that it could break even in 1981. The year was closed by orders for four more vessels. Over 1980 the loss was at first 23 million, but after the government converted a subordinate loan to shares the loss was only 0.5 million guilders.

In April 1981 the contractor Zanen-Verstoep ordered a big trailing suction dredger to be built at IHC-Smit. In December 1981 IHC announced orders for four Cutter Section Dredgers totaling 150 million for Russia, and other orders. All these orders were expected to be profitable.

=== IHC Sliedrecht: standardized cutter suction dredgers ===
In January 1981 IHC started construction of a new shipyard in Sliedrecht for 63.5 million guilders, of which the state would pay 30%. It was planned on the terrain of Van Rees, and would replace the old shipyards of Van Rees and machine factory De Klop. Construction would start in December 1981. Later it became clear that the IHC strategy was to build simple standard cutter suction dredgers in series at Sliedrecht, reducing cost by 20%. The standard cutter suction dredger series called 'Beaver' dated from 1963. They were produced in series, and on stock. In May 1983 the new shipyard in Sliedrecht was opened.

=== Oranjewerf ===
1982 started with the Oranjewerf shipyard becoming independent. Oranjewerf had been the repair shipyard of Verschure. A new independent company was formed in which IHC, a foundation, and the employees each became one-third shareholders. 1982 ended with a small profit.

=== IHC Smit: Custom vessels ===
During the opening of the new shipyard in Sliedrecht in May 1983, IHC announced an investment of 80 million at IHC Smit in Kinderdijk, again with the state paying 30%. IHC Smit was designated to build the large custom designed dredgers. These were mostly trailing suction dredgers. In December 1984 the 25 million guilder new construction halls of IHC Smit would be opened. At the time IHC was building an oil production platform for Placid Oil.

=== New crisis in shipbuilding ===
In 1984, Caland Holdings (46% owner of IHC Holland, and 40% owner of IHC Inc. i.e. SBM) and IHC inter (60% owner of IHC Inc.) merged again. For IHC Holland it meant that the owner of the later SBM again got a direct financial interest in ordering vessels at IHC Holland.

In 1985 the Dutch government decreased support for shipbuilding. IHC got only 32 million instead of the 64 million it had hoped to get. Shipbuilders and unions thought themselves duped by the row over the parliamentary inquiry about Rijn-Schelde-Verolme. IHC then suddenly got into trouble at IHC Sliedrecht. IHC Sliedrecht built standardized dredging vessels for countries like Nigeria, Mexico, India and Argentina. In the developing world there was a general debt crisis, e.g. the Latin American debt crisis, which made that demand for these ships slowed down. In September 1985 13 unsold ships worth 40 million guilders were in stock. These were expected to be sold in 1.5 years. Meanwhile 60 of the 520 employees at Sliedrecht would be fired. In November 1985 Van der Giessen-de Noord launched its large big ship, and then decided to scale radically, from 1,500 to 400 employees. It made IHC Holland the biggest remaining shipbuilder.

In April 1986 IHC Holland announced that it would scale back from 2,075 to 1,500 jobs, because revenue in the dredging market would decrease from 450 million to 300 million. The market for dredging companies was so tight that dredgers conferred about collectively breaking up dredging vessels to reduce overcapacity. The labor union blamed a failing sales organization. The biggest lay-offs would be at IHC-Smit, which would go back from 1,075 to 675 employees. By the end of 1986 IHC Holland was desperate for new orders. To keep the shipyard open, it was even building coasters as subcontractor for Damen. By October 1987 the number of jobs which had been lost amounted to 800 of 2,200. IHC then announced even more job cuts. By November the loss of 600 more jobs was announced.

=== Reorganization (1988) ===
In 1988 IHC Holland would finally succeed in acquiring new orders. However, by then IHC Holland was technically bankrupt. The existing shareholders lost their shares. After payment, IHC Caland got a new 47% share in IHC Holland. Other participants were Ellicott Machine Corp. for 42% and Algemene Participatie Maatschappij for 12%. The total price was 34 million.

=== De Machinefabriek Noordwijkerhout (DMN) ===
In March 1989 the new IHC sold its machine factory De Machinefabriek Noordwijkerhout (DMN) with 70 employees.

=== Outsourcing, flex, and new growth ===
From April to October 1988 the new IHC Holland got orders for 200 million. In early 1989 another 65 million in orders was acquired. Over 1989 profit was 14 million guilders. In April 1990 IHC Caland then increased its share in IHC Holland to 70%. In May 1992 IHC Caland announced that it had become 100% owner of IHC Holland after purchasing the last 30% from Ellicott. In 1992 IHC Holland got a Chinese order worth 200 million for three trailing suction dredgers. Later IHC got a 125 million Belgian order for a trailing suction dredger that was by far the biggest of its kind.

Meanwhile, the nature of the work at the IHC shipyards had changed. It became more usual to build most, or all of a new dredging vessel in developing countries with assistance and parts supplied by IHC Holland. This outsourcing would also take place locally, with many parts of the production process outsourced to specialist companies. IHC would also become known as one of the first Dutch companies to massively hire employees via private employment agencies.

=== Sisterhood with Shipyard De Merwede (1993) ===
By October 1992 De Merwede shipyard, one of the few remaining Dutch shipyards building ocean-going ships, was in serious trouble. It had built a hopper suction dredger for 100 million for the dredging company Jan De Nul from Belgium. It was delivered at a big loss in November 1992. The only order left at the time was that for the navy replenishment oiler HNLMS Amsterdam (A836). In February 1993 IHC Caland then bought De Merwede. One of the reasons to do this was the risk of a competitor buying it. As a sister company of IHC Holland, De Merwede got some big orders via IHC Holland in 1994 and 1995.

In 1995 IHC got an order by Samsung for a wheel suction dredger and some 'Beaver' cutter suction dredgers. This was unique, because Samsung had Samsung Heavy Industries, which was the biggest shipyard of the world. Samsung normally built dredgers themselves, using American designs. That year IHC had so much work that it did not even enter a tender for a big dredger for Boskalis.

=== Sisterhood with Van der Giessen de Noord ===
In 1997 IHC Caland bought Van der Giessen de Noord, practically the last builder of large commercial vessels in the Netherlands. It was specialized in passenger ships, mainly ferries. After some mishaps with larger orders, and the post 11 September 2001 slowdown, it became quiet at Van der Giessen. After some dredging vessels were built, IHC decided to close down the shipyard in August 2003.

=== IHC Holland becomes independent again (2003–2005) ===
In 2003 IHC Caland decided to sell IHC Holland. Reasons were that the shipbuilding market was highly irregular compared to the Oil and Gas. Shipbuilding employed half of the group's employees, but was responsible for only 5% of the share value. Shareholders therefore thought they would be better off without the shipbuilding activities. The sale was finished on 1 March 2005 On 11 February 2005 IHC Caland was then renamed SBM Offshore.

The new owners were represented in IHC B.V., a private company with shareholders: Rabobank Participaties B.V. for 49%, management and employees for 33%, and Parkland for 18%. Parkland was part of Indofin Group founded by billionaire Cees de Bruin (1946-2020). In 2013 Indofin would increase its share to 62%, by buying 39% from Rabo.

=== IHC Merwede (2005–2007) ===
After IHC Holland and De Merwede were merged in 2005, the name became IHC Holland Merwede. In November 2007 the name IHC Holland Merwede was changed to IHC Merwede.

=== Royal IHC (2013–2014) ===
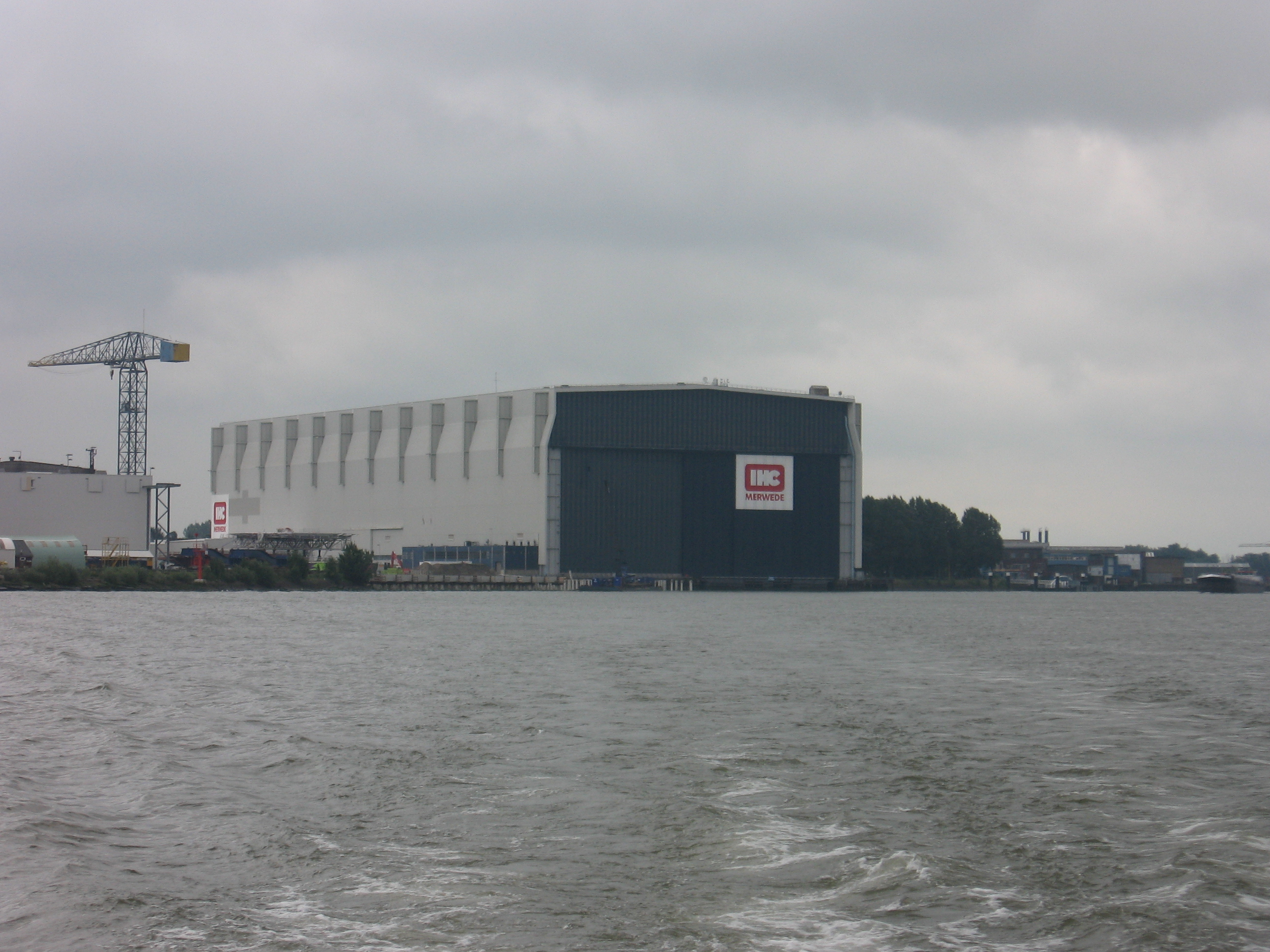
The IHC shipyard in Krimpen aan den IJssel in 2008

In 2013 IHC Merwede celebrated its 325th anniversary. On 19 June 2014 it received the distinction Koninklijke (royal), and changed its name to 'Royal IHC'. The logo was changed to include a crown.

In mid 2013 IHC got its biggest order ever. For the Brazilean oil industry it would build six pipe-laying ships for about 1 billion euros. These would be used in production at oil fields at more than 2,500 m depth. 4,000 people would be employed, mainly in Kinderdijk and Krimpen aan den IJssel and at suppliers. Delivery was planned in 2015 and 2016.

In June 2015 IHC announced that it would concentrate shipbuilding in Krimpen aan de IJssel and Kinderdijk. Sliedrecht would only be used for fitting out. The shipyard in Hardinxveld would be closed down completely. At least 487 regular jobs, and about 1,100 flex jobs would be lost.

Over 2018 there was a record loss of 80 million euros. This was mainly due to large cost overruns at some big projects. As a remedy 120 million euros were injected into the company. The banks provided 90 million, shareholders provided 30 million as subordinate debt.

=== New take over (2020) ===
In 2019 some dredging companies in the Netherlands and Belgium found out that a Chinese investor had shown interest to buy the troubled Royal IHC. They did not like this idea, because it would endanger their market positions. They then founded a consortium consisting of: Ackermans & van Haaren (owner of DEME), HAL Investments (45.54% owner of Boskalis), the Van Oord family (owner of Van Oord), and the owners of Huisman Dredging. In November 2020 IHC announced the loss of 1,100 jobs.

In September 2023 Royal IHC signed a contract with the Department of Material Maintenance (DMI) to perform dock-related maintenance on three auxiliary vessels of the Royal Netherlands Navy, which includes the HNLMS Mercuur, HNLMS Snellius and HNLMS Luymes.

During NEDS 2023 Royal IHC showcased a seabed crawler that is dedicated to seabed warfare.

In June 2024 it was reported that IHC Defence signed a contract with COMMIT to supply six winch and handling systems for the Anti-Submarine Warfare Frigates.

On 24 September 2025, the firm signed a Memorandum of Understanding (MoU) with India-based Swan Defence and Heavy Industries Limited (SDHI) to collaborate on the construction of Offshore Construction Vessels in India. The Royal IHC's representative in India, Alar Infrastructure, is also part of the agreement which includes the design, construction and retrofitting of multiple types of ships like Offshore Construction Vessels, Pipe Laying Vessels, and Multi-Purpose Offshore Support Vessels at SDHI's infrastructure based in Pipavav Port. The shipyard features India's largest dry dock with a dimension of 662 m × 65 m along with a fabrication capacity of 144,000 tons per annum.

== Activities ==
The shipbuilding company focuses on shipbuilding, offshore, mining and foundation techniques.
