= HNLMS Van Kinsbergen =

At least three ships of the Royal Netherlands Navy have been named HNLMS Van Kinsbergen after Admiral Jan Hendrik van Kinsbergen (1735–1819):

- HNLMS Van Kinsbergen (1939), was a sloop-of-war of the Royal Netherlands Navy that served in World War II.
- HNLMS Van Kinsbergen (F809), third of the Kortenaer-class frigates, entered service in 1980.
- HNLMS Van Kinsbergen (A902), training vessel for the Royal Netherlands Navy, entered service in 1999.
