= HNLMS Buyskes =

Naval ship built in 1973

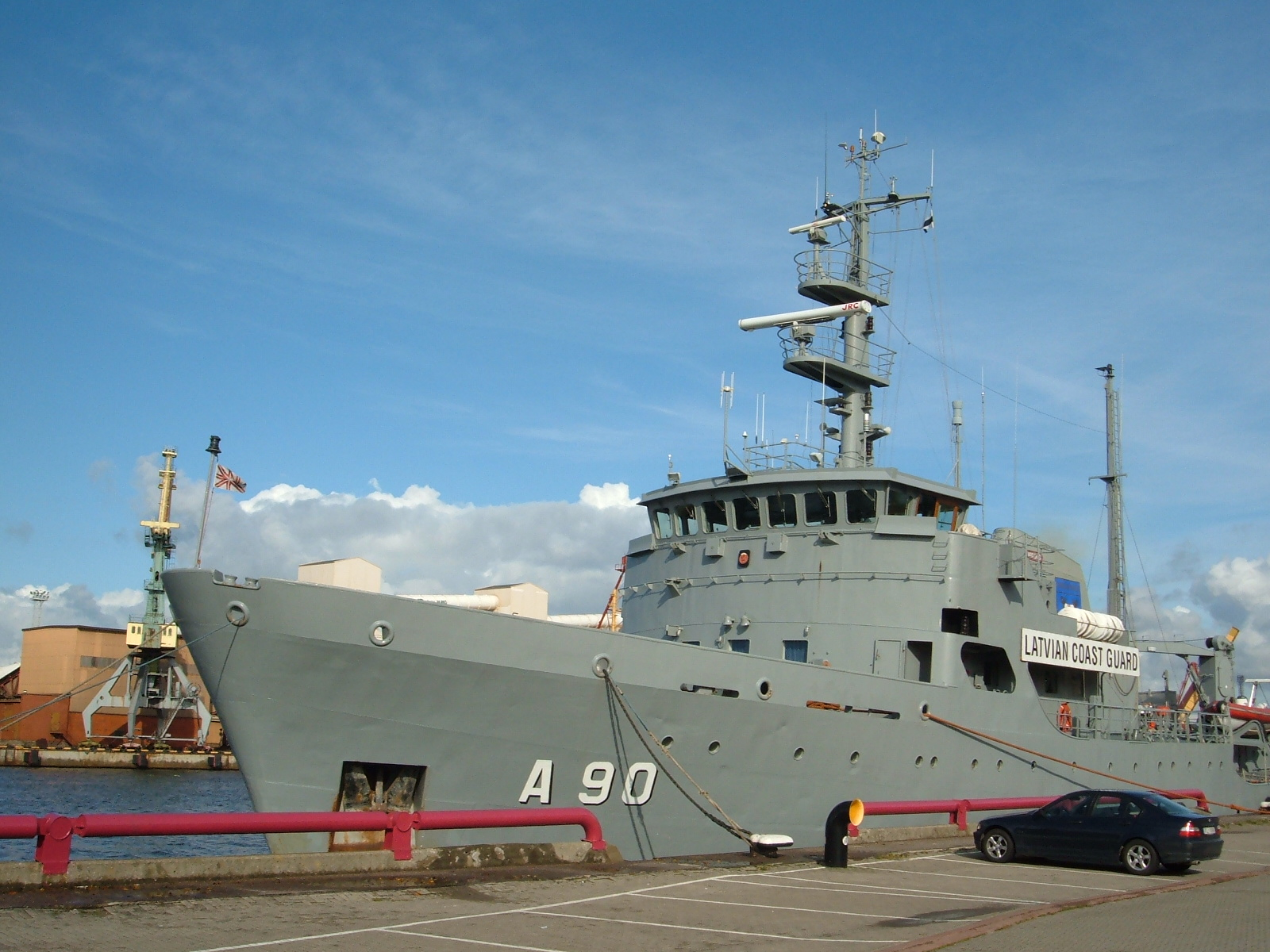
- Buyskes in service with the Latvian Navy as Varonis

History

Netherlands
- Name: Buyskes
- Namesake: Arnold Adriaan Buyskes
- Builder: Boele's Scheepwerven en Machinefabriek B.V., Bolnes
- Laid down: 31 January 1972
- Launched: 11 July 1972
- Commissioned: 9 March 1973
- Decommissioned: 11 December 2003
- Identification: Hull number: A904
- Fate: Sold to Latvia, 2004

Latvia
- Name: Varonis
- Acquired: 8 November 2004
- Commissioned: 11 November 2004
- Identification: MMSI number: 275307000; Hull number: A-90
- Status: in active service, as of 2025

General characteristics
- Type: Buyskes-class hydrographic survey vessel / Staff and support
- Displacement: 1,033 t (1,017 long tons)
- Length: 59.50 m (195 ft 3 in)
- Beam: 11.20 m (36 ft 9 in)
- Draught: 3.70 metres (12 ft 2 in)
- Installed power: 1,400 hp (1,000 kW)
- Propulsion: 1 propeller; 3 Paxman diesel engines
- Speed: 13.5 knots (25.0 km/h; 15.5 mph)
- Crew: 43

HNLMS Buyskes (A904) was a hydrographic survey vessel of the Royal Netherlands Navy. She was built by Boele's Scheepwerven en Machinefabriek B.V. located at Bolnes in 1973, and named for Arnold Adriaan Buyskes. Buyskes was sold to the Latvian Navy in 2004. She was renamed Varonis, which translated from Latvian means "Hero".

Her sister ship Blommendal was scrapped in 2016.

== Citations ==
=== Bibliography ===
- Saunders, Stephen, ed. (2015). IHS Jane's Fighting Ships 2015-2016. Coulsdon, Surrey: Janes Information Group. ISBN 978-0-7106-3143-5.
- van Amstel, W.H.E. (1991). De schepen van de Koninklijke Marine vanaf 1945 (in Dutch). Alkmaar: De Alk. ISBN 90-6013-997-6.
