= Buyskes-class hydrographic survey vessel =

Ships of the Royal Netherlands Navy

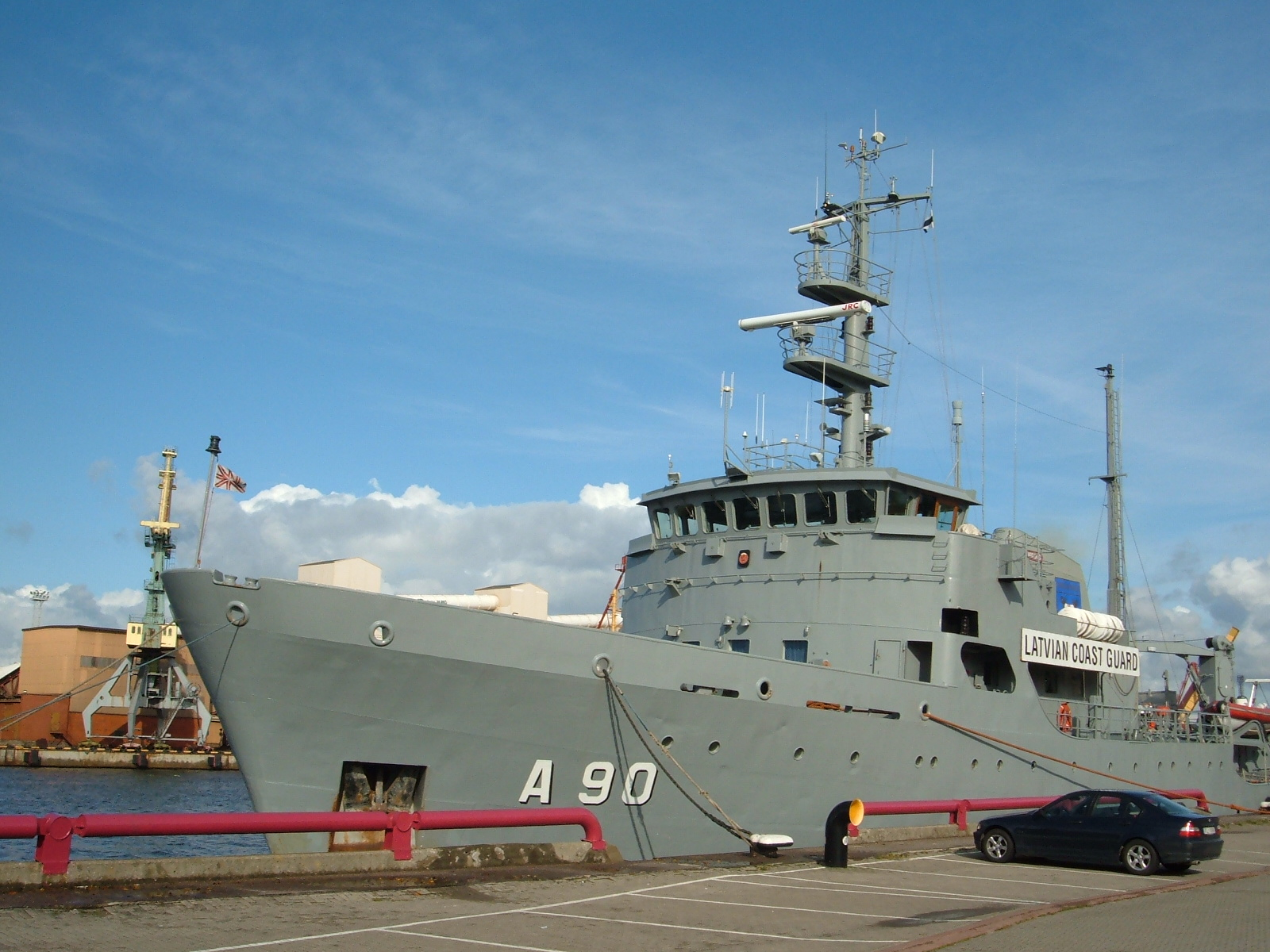
- Buyskes in service with the Latvian Navy as Varonis

Class overview
- Name: Buyskes class
- Builders: Boele's Scheepswerven en Machinefabriek, Bolnes
- Operators: Initial; Royal Netherlands Navy; Export; Latvian Naval Forces
- Preceded by: Snellius class
- Succeeded by: Snellius class
- Built: 1972–1973
- In commission: 1973-present
- Planned: 2
- Completed: 2
- Active: 1
- Scrapped: 1

General characteristics
- Type: Hydrographic survey vessel
- Displacement: 967 t (952 long tons)
- Length: 60 m (196 ft 10 in)
- Beam: 11.1 m (36 ft 5 in)
- Draft: 3.7 metres (12 ft 2 in)
- Propulsion: 1 propeller; 1,400 hp (1,000 kW); 3 Paxman diesel engines
- Speed: 13.5 knots (25.0 km/h; 15.5 mph)
- Crew: 43

The Buyskes class was a class of two hydrographic survey vessels that were part of the Dutch Hydrographic Service of the Royal Netherlands Navy. Together with HNLMS Tydeman the ships of this class were the main ships of the Dutch Hydrographic Service during the last quarter of the 20th century. While the ships of the Buyskes class were built for performing hydrographic research, the Tydeman was focused on oceanography.

== Design and construction ==
Both ships were built at Boele's Scheepwerven en Machinefabriek B.V. in Bolnes and replaced the hydrographic survey vessels of the Snellius class. They were equipped with the automated "Hydraut" system that allowed them to perform hydrographic measuring. The data this system gathered was used to make detailed maps. However, in comparison to Tydeman the Buyskes-class ships were deemed less modern.

The Buyskes undertook her sea trials in January 1973, while the Blommendal did her sea trials in April 1973. In the same year both ships were taken into service of the Royal Netherlands Navy.

== Service history ==
The ships were active in the North Sea.

Blommendal was decommissioned on 15 December 1999. She was followed by Buyskes four years later on 11 December 2003.

Blommendal was sold to a maritime foundation, Het Maritiem Kwartier, as a tool to keep the history of older vessels alive and educate people about them. She remained laid up near the NDSM yard in Amsterdam until 2016 when she was scrapped in Haarlem.

In 2004 Buyskes was sold to the Latvian Navy and renamed Varonis.

== Ships in class ==
Buyskes-class construction data
Ship	Pennant number	Laid down	Launched	Commissioned	Decommissioned	Fate
Buyskes	A904	31 January 1972	11 July 1972	9 March 1973	11 December 2003	Sold to Latvia in 2004
Blommendal	A905	1 August 1972	21 November 1972	22 May 1973	15 December 1999	Scrapped in 2016
