= HNLMS Zeefakkel =

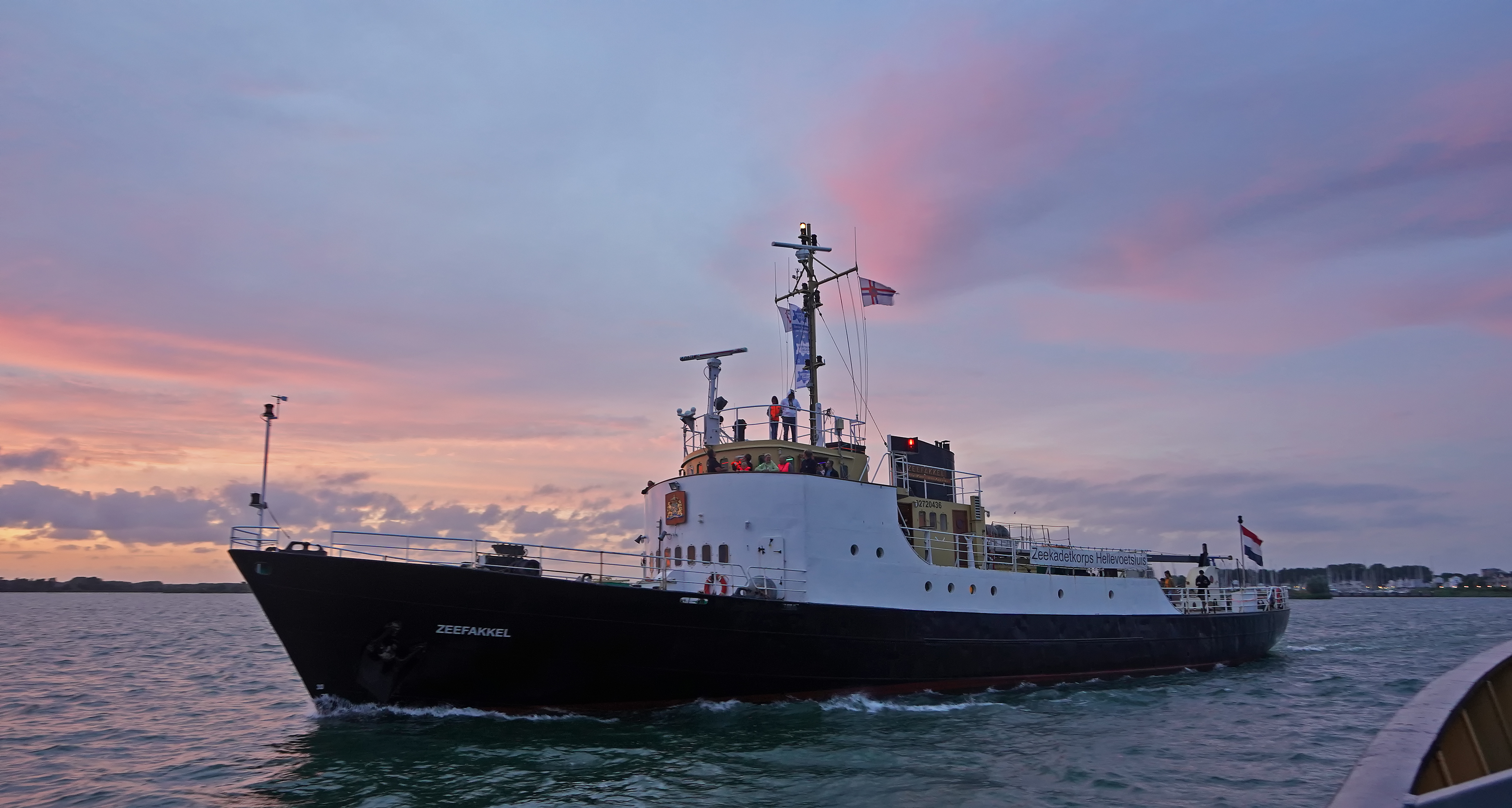
- Zeefakkel

History

Netherlands
- Name: Zeefakkel
- Operator: Royal Netherlands Navy
- Builder: J. & K. Smit, Kinderdijk
- Laid down: 28 November 1949
- Launched: 21 September 1950
- Commissioned: 22 May 1951
- Identification: A903

General characteristics
- Type: Hydrographic survey vessel (1951-1972); Training vessel
- Displacement: 355 t (349 long tons)
- Length: 45.4 m (148 ft 11 in)
- Beam: 7.6 m (24 ft 11 in)
- Draught: 2.1 m (6 ft 11 in)
- Propulsion: 2 propeller; 640 hp (480 kW); 2 x Smit-Man diesel engines
- Speed: 12 knots (22 km/h; 14 mph)
- Crew: 29
- Armament: 1 x 40 mm AA gun

HNLMS Zeefakkel was a hydrographic survey vessel built in the Netherlands for the Royal Netherlands Navy. She was specially designed to perform surveys in coastal areas and did this between 1951 and 1972. Later she was turned into a training vessel.

== Design and construction ==
Zeefakkel was built at the shipyard of J. & K. Smit in Kinderdijk. The ship was laid down on 28 November 1949, launched on 21 September 1950 and commissioned into the Royal Netherlands Navy (RNN) on 22 May 1951. The survey vessel got assigned the pennant number A903.

The ship was equipped with two 8 cylinder four-stroke Smit-Man diesel engines that could produce 320 horsepower each, for a total of 640 hp. This allowed Zeefakkel to reach a maximum speed of 12 knots.

For performing surveys the ship was equipped with several systems: it had an echo sounder, radar, ASDIC, Decca and gyrocompass.

== Service history ==
Zeefakkel performed hydrographic surveys till the end of 1972. The ship was afterwards replaced by one of the hydrographic survey vessels of the Buyskes-class. Nonetheless, Zeefakkel did stay in service of the RNN as training vessel.

She was re-engined in 1980.

Zeefakkel was still in service circa 1999–2000, when Jane's Fighting Ships 1999-2000 wrote that she was being used as a local training ship at Den Helder. She was to be replaced by another ship possibly to be launched in late 1999. Jane's no longer listed the ship as having any armament.

After the new vessel was placed in service Zeefakkel was laid up in reserve until January 2000, when she was handed over to the Dutch Sea Cadet Corps as a training ship (nl:Zeekadetkorps). By 2023 she was still in service in that function.
