= HNLMS Urania (2004) =

Training ship

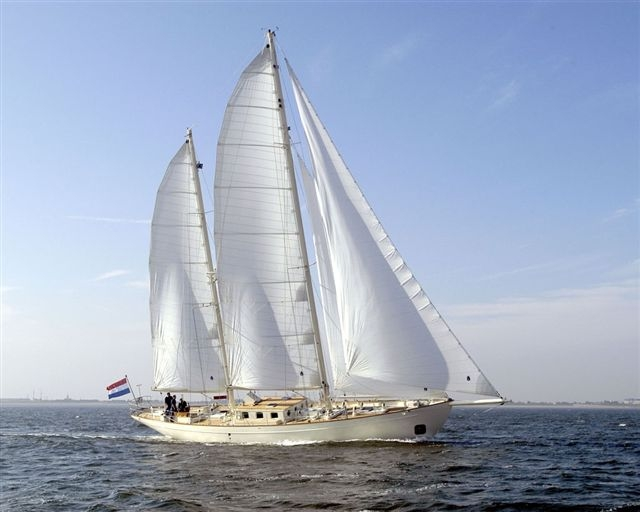
- Urania

Class overview
- Name: Urania class
- Operators: Royal Netherlands Navy
- Preceded by: HNLMS Urania
- In commission: 2004 – present
- Completed: 1
- Active: 1

History

Netherlands
- Name: Urania
- Builder: De Gier & Bezaan Int. (Hull); Dutch Navy (Fitting out)
- Laid down: 2003
- Launched: 18 May 2004
- Commissioned: 25 May 2004
- Home port: Den Helder
- Identification: MMSI number: 245804000; Callsign: PAFG
- Status: in active service

General characteristics
- Type: Training ship
- Displacement: 80 tons
- Length: 26.85 m (88 ft 1 in)
- Beam: 6.04 m (19 ft 10 in)
- Draft: 2.50 m (8 ft 2 in)
- Propulsion: 305 m^{2} (3,280 sq ft) sails; 1 × 253 hp (189 kW) Caterpillar diesel engine
- Sail plan: Ketch
- Speed: 7 knots (13 km/h; 8.1 mph) (Engine); 10 knots (19 km/h; 12 mph) (Sail)
- Complement: 14 students
- Crew: 3 to 4

HNLMS Urania (Dutch: Zr.Ms. Urania) is a naval training ship of the Dutch Navy and is used to train future Adelborsten from the Royal Naval College.

== History ==
When the old HNLMS Urania had a hole punched in the hull she needed to be replaced. Due to budget cuts this was not an option so the navy opted for an extensive refit. During this refit it was uncovered that most of the ship was being held together with putty. Olivier F. van Meer was charged with the design of the new ship that had to resemble the old Urania at a distance. The keel was laid in 2003 at De Gier & Bezaan Int. in Enkhuizen and in mid-2003 the hull was moved to Den Helder for fitting out by the navy.

Eventually she was launched on 18 May 2004, and commissioned a week later. Some parts of the old Urania were used in the construction of the new one. For example, the old stern was fitted to the new ship but in the end was removed again in favour of a new stern. The only remaining bit from the old Uranina being the wheel.

== See also ==
- HNLMS Van Kinsbergen
