= HNLMS Soemba =

HNLMS Soemba (Dutch: Hr.Ms. or Zr.Ms. Soemba) may refer to the following ships of the Royal Netherlands Navy that have been named after the Indonesian island Sumba:

- HNLMS Soemba (1925), was a Flores-class gunboat
- HNLMS Soemba (A850), is a diving support vessel
