= HNLMS Urania (1928) =

Training ship

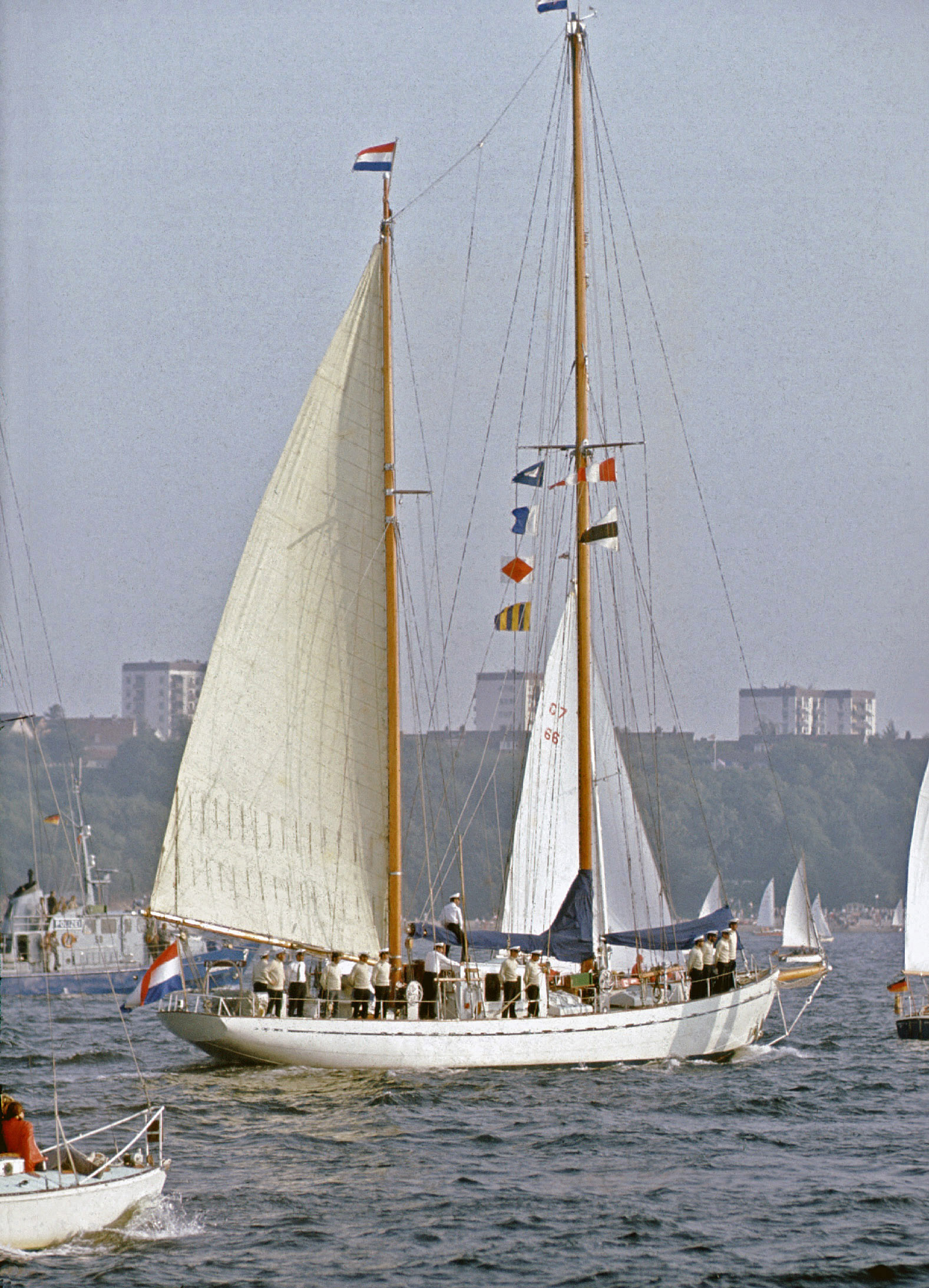
- Urania in Kiel in 1972

Class overview
- Builders: Haarlemse Scheepsbouw Maatschappij, Haarlem
- Succeeded by: HNLMS Urania
- In service: 1928 - 2001
- In commission: 1938 - 2001
- Completed: 1
- Retired: 1

History

Netherlands
- Name: Tromp
- Owner: Boudewijn Nierstrasz
- In service: 1928
- Out of service: 1937
- Fate: Sold to the Dutch Navy for ƒ30.000

Netherlands
- Name: Urania
- Namesake: The muse Urania
- Operator: Royal Netherlands Navy
- Acquired: 1937
- Commissioned: 23 April 1938
- Decommissioned: 2001
- Nickname(s): Grand Old Lady
- Fate: Scrapped
- Notes: Parts of the ship were used in its replacement

General characteristics
- Type: Training ship
- Displacement: 38 t (37 long tons)
- Length: 24 m (78 ft 9 in)
- Beam: 8.1 m (26 ft 7 in)
- Draft: 3.1 m (10 ft 2 in)
- Propulsion: 509 square metres (5,480 sq ft) sails; 96 hp (72 kW); 1 x DAF diesel engine
- Sail plan: Ketch
- Speed: 7 knots (13 km/h; 8.1 mph) (Engine); 12 knots (22 km/h; 14 mph) (Sail)
- Crew: 17 (5 staff and 12 trainees)
- Sensors & processing systems: Koden MD-3600 radar

HNLMS Urania (Dutch: Zr.Ms. Urania) was a naval training ship of the Dutch Navy and was used to train future Adelborsten from the Royal Naval College (KIM).

== History ==
From 1488 to 1798 navy personnel were trained onboard naval ships in service. Two vessels were selected in 1798 as dedicated training ship, they were succeeded by several ships with periods in which there was no sail training ship. a new era without a training ship started when in 1927 HNLMS Willemsoord II was retired.

In 1935, '36 and '37 KIM teacher J.H. Coolhaas made several journeys on a small yacht from their own KIM row- and sail association, named Kijkduin. Among other people, Coolhaas pleaded for a new sail training ship because they thought they were better for character building and developing seamanship compared to steamships. The Dutch navy was interested in the idea but due to budget limitations a new ship or a large one like the Schulschiff Deutschland were not an option, but buying a secondhand ship was a possibility.

Former naval officer Boudewijn Nierstrasz offered his yacht, Tromp, as a candidate. Tromp was built in 1928 by the Haarlemse Scheepsbouw Maatschappij. Originally she had a wishbone rig which was later replaced with a gaff rig. In 1937 the navy bought the yacht and after a small refit she was commissioned into the navy as Urania on 23 April 1938 by Nierstrasz's wife.

During the Second World War Urania was taken over by the germans on 14 May 1940 at Willemsoord. She was taken to Nazi Germany to train naval officers from the Mürwik Naval School. After the war, she was found and returned to the Netherlands. After a refit she re-entered service in 1948.

In 1957 her rig was changed again from a gaff rig to a bermuda rig. The sleeping accommodation was also enlarged from 15 beds to 17.

=== Replacement ===
When a hole was punched in the hull of the old Urania she needed to be replaced. Due to budget restrictions, this wasn't an option so the navy opted for an extensive refit. During this refit, it was uncovered that most of the ship was being held together with putty. Olivier F. van Meer was charged with the design of the new ship that had to resemble the old Urania at a distance. The keel was laid in 2003 at De Gier & Bezaan Int. in Enkhuizen and she was eventually commissioned on 25 May 2004. The new ship was Initially constructed with the stern of the old Urania. But after review it was decided that a new stern would be constructed. The only bit that remained from the old Urania was the wheel.

== See also ==
- HNLMS Van Kinsbergen
