= HNLMS Van Kinsbergen (A902) =

Training ship

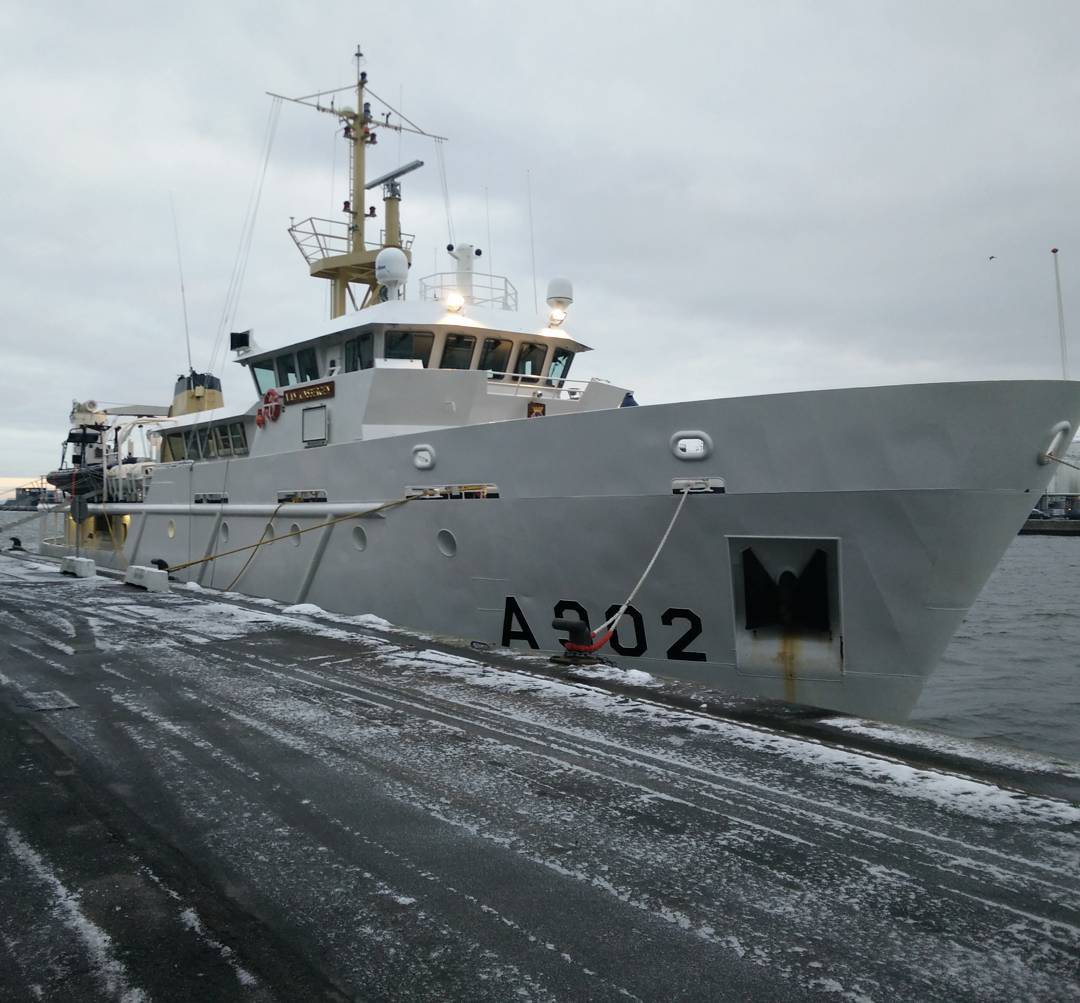
- Van Kinsbergen

Class overview
- Name: Van Kinsbergen class
- Operators: Royal Netherlands Navy
- Preceded by: HNLMS Zeefakkel
- In commission: 1999–present
- Completed: 1
- Active: 1

History

Netherlands
- Name: Van Kinsbergen
- Builder: Damen Shipyards Gorinchem
- Laid down: 1998
- Commissioned: 2 November 1999
- Home port: Den Helder
- Identification: IMO number: 9201578; MMSI number: 244736000; Callsign: PAKB
- Status: in active service

General characteristics
- Type: Training ship
- Tonnage: 630 GT
- Length: 41.50 m (136 ft 2 in)
- Beam: 9.20 m (30 ft 2 in)
- Draft: 3.30 m (10 ft 10 in)
- Speed: 12.8 knots (23.7 km/h; 14.7 mph)
- Boats & landing craft carried: 1 × RHIB
- Complement: 16 students
- Crew: 2 + 5 (5 civilian + 5 naval)

HNLMS Van Kinsbergen (Dutch: Zr.Ms. Van Kinsbergen), or MOV Van Kinsbergen (Dutch: Marine Opleidingsvaartuig (MOV) Van Kinsbergen) is a naval training ship of the Royal Netherlands Navy.

== History ==
Van Kinsbergen was designed as a replacement for the ageing HNLMS Zeefakkel. Zeefakkel was notorious for making people seasick and the new ship was supposed to prevent this from happening. However, the ship is too short, supposedly due to budget cuts, and has very poor sailing characteristics in heavy seas. Van Kinsbergen is therefor mockingly nicknamed the Van Kotsbergen, (English: Van Pukebergen, referencing puke).

She is the first purposly built training vessel for the Dutch Navy and therefor is designed with two bridges, one for the navigation and one for training purposes. Van Kinsbergen sails around 200 days in a year, mostly in the Baltic Sea to train students from the Royal Naval College.

In December 2009 she was asked by Danish authorities the help search for a sailboat in trouble on the Little Belt between Funen and the Jutland Peninsula. She took on the three sailers and the sailboat was towed with the RHIB. In July 2010 Van Kinsbergen successfully recovered a large model aircraft from the English Channel which had caused some commotion on the busy sea lane.

In December 2025 Van Kinsbergen was docked at Damen Shipyards for inspection, repair and maintenance.

== Replacement ==
Van Kinsbergen is set to be replaced along with HNLMS Mercuur, HNLMS Pelikaan, HNLMS Soemba, the four Cerberus-class diving support vessels and the two Snellius-class hydrographic survey vessels. On 16 June 2022 it was announced in the B-letter that these ten vessels will be replaced by eight new ships of the same family. Four will be oceangoing and the other four are for coastal or inland duties. Van Kinsbergen is to be replaced by the oceangoing variant. These ships will be built by a Dutch shipyard which will be selected in 2024.

== See also ==
- Future of the Royal Netherlands Navy
