= Dienst der Hydrografie =

Hydrographic Service of the Royal Netherlands Navy

Royal Netherlands Navy Hydrographic Service
- Dienst der Hydrografie
- Founded: 1874; 152 years ago
- Country: Netherlands
- Branch: Royal Netherlands Navy
- Part of: Ministry of Defence

The Royal Netherlands Navy Hydrographic Service (Dutch: Dienst der Hydrografie) is a department within the Royal Netherlands Navy that is responsible for surveying and charting the waters of the Netherlands, and of the waters in the Caribbean part of the Kingdom. It also informs mariners about shipping routes, the seabed and underwater hazards such as shipwrecks by making use of its nautical charts, measurements and detailed knowledge about the maritime borders of the Kingdom.

== History ==
The Royal Netherlands Navy Hydrographic Service was founded in 1874 as Bureau Hydrografie. It was led by a Chef der Hydrografie, with the first chef being A.R. Blommendal. Since its creation the Hydrographic service has been responsible for chartering the waters of the Netherlands and tasked with reporting any changes of the fairways to the maritime transport sector. These reports are regularly published under the title "Bericht aan Zeevarenden" (BAZ).

== Ships ==
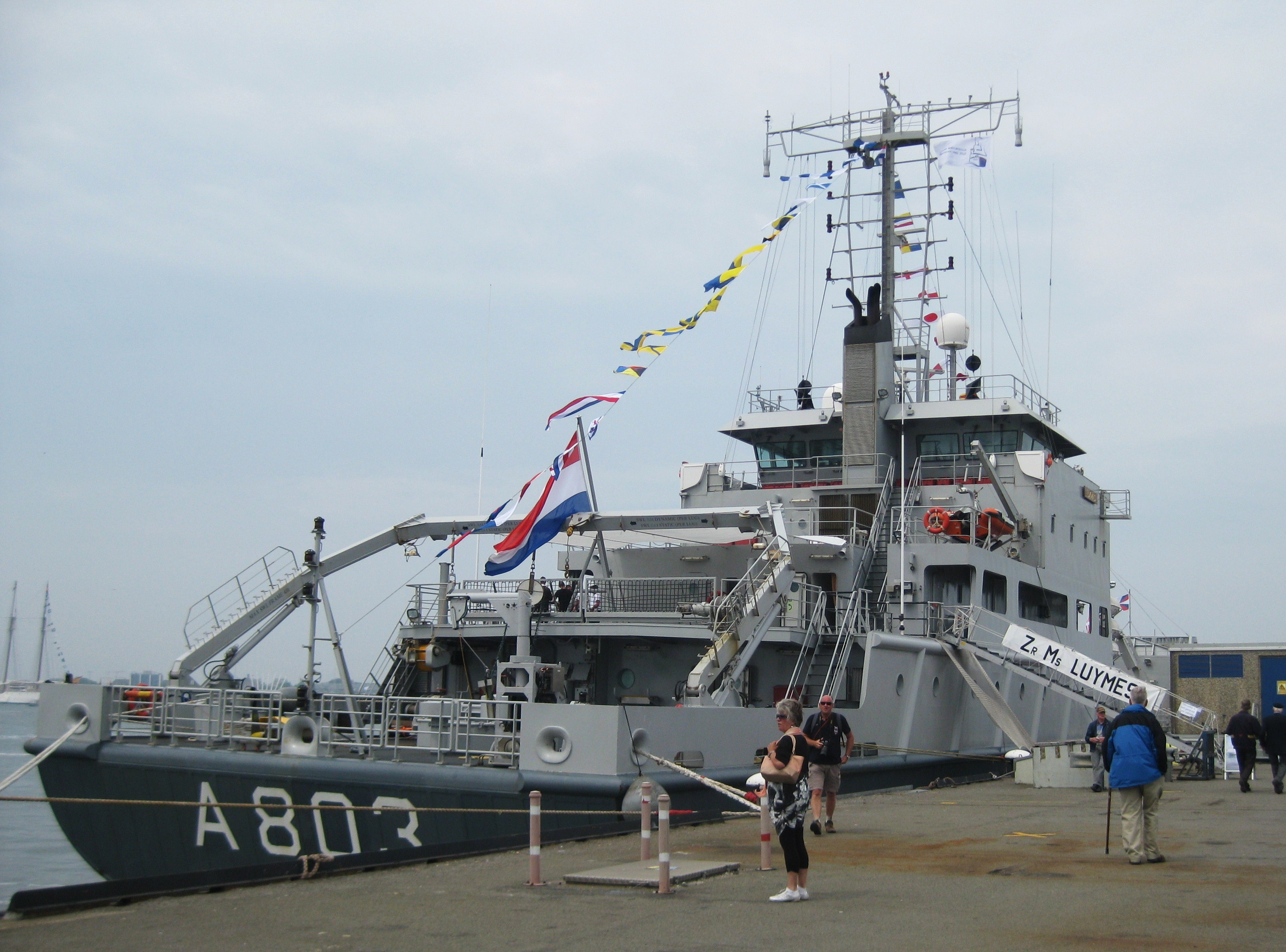
HNLMS Luymes during the Dutch Navy Days 2013

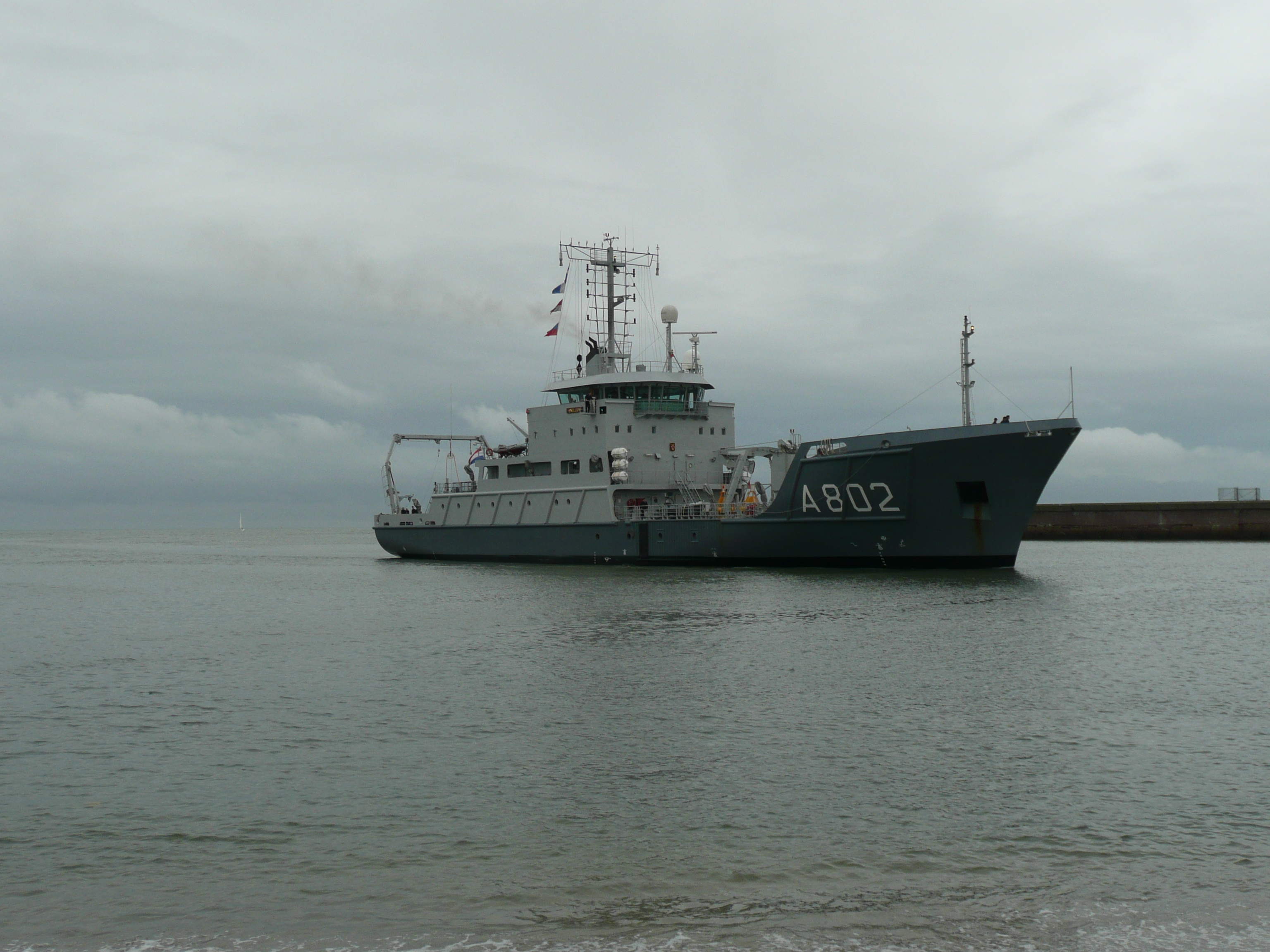
HNLMS Snellius

The Dutch Hydrographic Service currently operates two survey vessels which entered service in 2003 and 2004: HNLMS Snellius and HNLMS Luymes.

=== Equipment ===
The vessels of the Dutch Hydrographic Service are equipped with the most modern hydrographic equipment available. Soundings are taken with a multibeam echosounder which covers a much larger area than a single-beam echo sounder. The vessels also tow high-resolution side-scan sonar (HRSS) and a magnetometer to detect wrecks and other obstacles.

== Tasks and operations ==
The primary task of the Dutch Hydrographic Service is to provide tools for safe navigation in Dutch waters.

Highly frequented routes require more attention than less frequented parts of the North Sea and are thus being surveyed at least every two years (some areas in the Rotterdam approach even annually) Above that the southern part of the Dutch North Sea which attracts most of the traffic is covered with sandy shoals forming a great risk for deep-draught vessels. The important fairways to Rotterdam and IJmuiden are maintained and surveyed by the North Sea Service (Dienst Noordzee) of the Rijkswaterstaat.

The data of soundings and the information concerning obstacles is compiled by the Dienst der Hydrografie in The Hague together with information from other sources. Charts in the A0 format are produced mainly for merchant shipping. Additionally, there are charts of the so-called 1800 series in the A2 format for recreational shipping.

Other publications are the "Netherlands Coast Pilot" (HP1) describing the coasts and harbours of the Dutch coast and the tide tables and tidal stream atlas (HP33).

Changes important for shipping concerning buoys, wrecks etc. are published in the weekly Berichten aan Zeevarenden (Dutch Notice to Mariners) in order to provide for the update of charts and pilots.

== Remarks ==
- Until a few years ago the Dutch Navy also operated an oceanographic survey vessel (HNLMS Tydeman) which was primarily used for deep sea charting. Oceanographic surveys were often carried out in collaboration with universities. The ship was sold in 2006 and now serves as arctic cruise ship.
- As the survey ships were formerly painted white the ships of the Dutch Hydrographic Service were also known as the White Fleet. Currently the vessels have a dark grey hull and a light grey superstructure.
