= HNLMS Urania (1941) =

Training ship

History

Netherlands
- Name: Urania
- Builder: Marine Etablissement te Soerabaja, Dutch East Indies
- Commissioned: 1941
- Home port: Soerabaja

General characteristics
- Type: Training ship

HNLMS Urania was a training ship of the Royal Netherlands Navy. She was built in the Dutch East Indies and was a gift from the bourgeoisie of the colony. During the Second World War the ship was captured by the Japanese.

== Background ==
Urania was built at the Marine Etablissement te Soerabaja in the Dutch East Indies. The ship was a gift from the bourgeoisie of the colony to the recently established Koninklijke Instituut voor de Marine in Soerabaja. She was used as training ship by the Royal Netherlands Navy to train midshipman in the Dutch East Indies between 1941 and 1942.

== Service history ==
After being taken into service in 1941 Urania was used to train midshipman (Dutch: Adelborst) in Soerabaja. On 8 March 1942 the ship sailed, with Dutch navy personnel aboard, from Soerabaja to Australia. However, before she could reach her destination Urania was stopped and detained by a Japanese destroyer in the Madura Strait. On 10 March 1942 the ship was handed over to a Japanese troopship at Toeban and arrived on 16 March 1942 at Soerabaja. Her fate after arriving at Soerabaja remains unknown.
