= HNLMS Soemba (A850) =

Diving support and training vessel in Dutch Navy

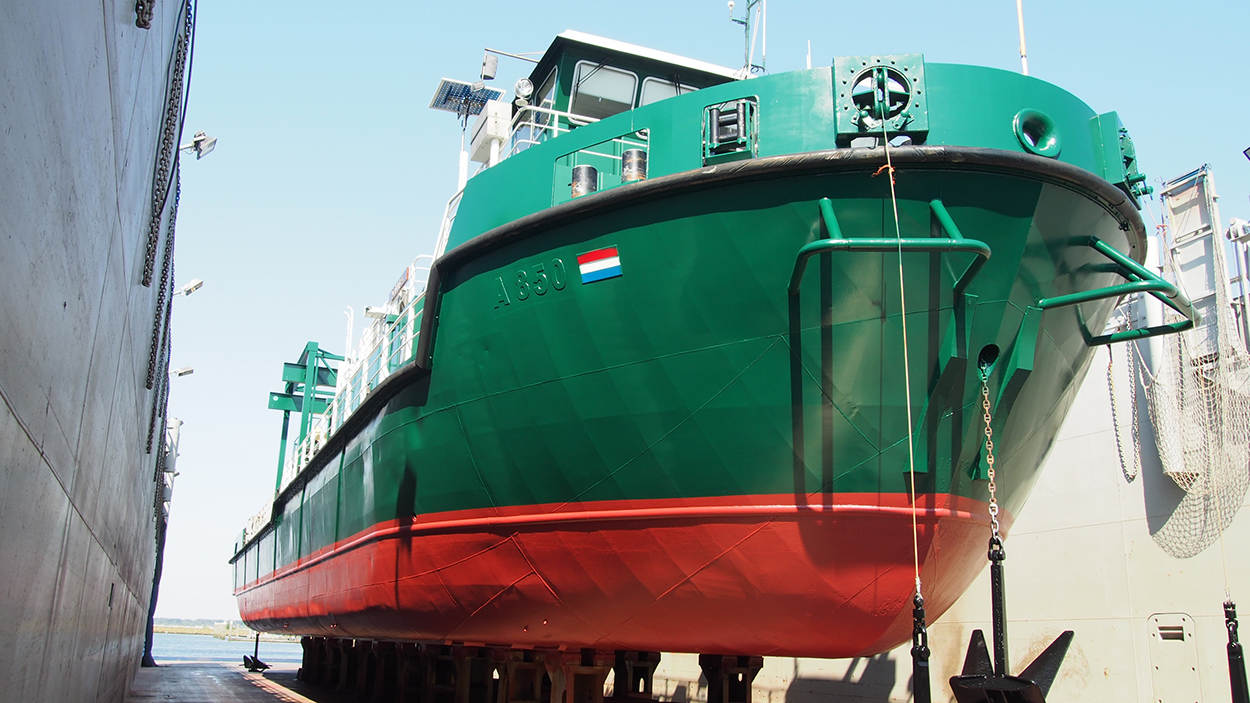
- Soemba in drydock

Class overview
- Name: Soemba class
- Builders: Vervaco, Heusden
- Operators: Royal Netherlands Army; Royal Netherlands Navy
- In commission: 1989–present
- Planned: 1
- Completed: 1
- Active: 1

History

Netherlands
- Commissioned: 3 November 1989
- Decommissioned: 6 June 2009
- Identification: Hull number: A850
- Fate: Transferred to the Navy

Netherlands
- Name: Soemba
- Namesake: Sumba
- Commissioned: 6 June 2009
- Home port: Nieuwe Haven Naval Base, Den Helder
- Identification: Hull number: A850; IMO number: 8388603; MMSI number: 244650033; Callsign: PH3567
- Badge

General characteristics
- Type: Diving support vessel
- Displacement: 410 t (404 long tons)
- Length: 42 m (137 ft 10 in)
- Beam: 9.50 m (31 ft 2 in)
- Height: 13.50 m (44 ft 3 in)
- Draft: 1.50 m (4 ft 11 in)
- Propulsion: 2 × DAF 1160 DKV
- Speed: 8.5 knots (15.7 km/h; 9.8 mph)
- Capacity: 17 passengers
- Crew: 4

HNLMS Soemba is a diving support and training vessel in service with the Dutch Navy. The vessel was constructed by Vervaco, Heusden for the Dutch Army as a training vessel for their divers. The current Soemba is the second vessel in the Dutch Navy with this name, following HNLMS Soemba which was scrapped on 12 July 1985.

== Construction and career ==
Soemba was originally built for the Dutch Army as a training vessel but was transferred to the Dutch Navy in 2009 when their diving schools merged.

Soemba is set to be replaced alongside the Mercuur, Pelikaan, Snellius class, Cerberus class and the Van Kinsbergen by a common family of ships. The builder of the new ships will be selected in 2024.

- See Auxiliary ship replacement program for more information.
