= Snellius-class hydrographic survey vessel =

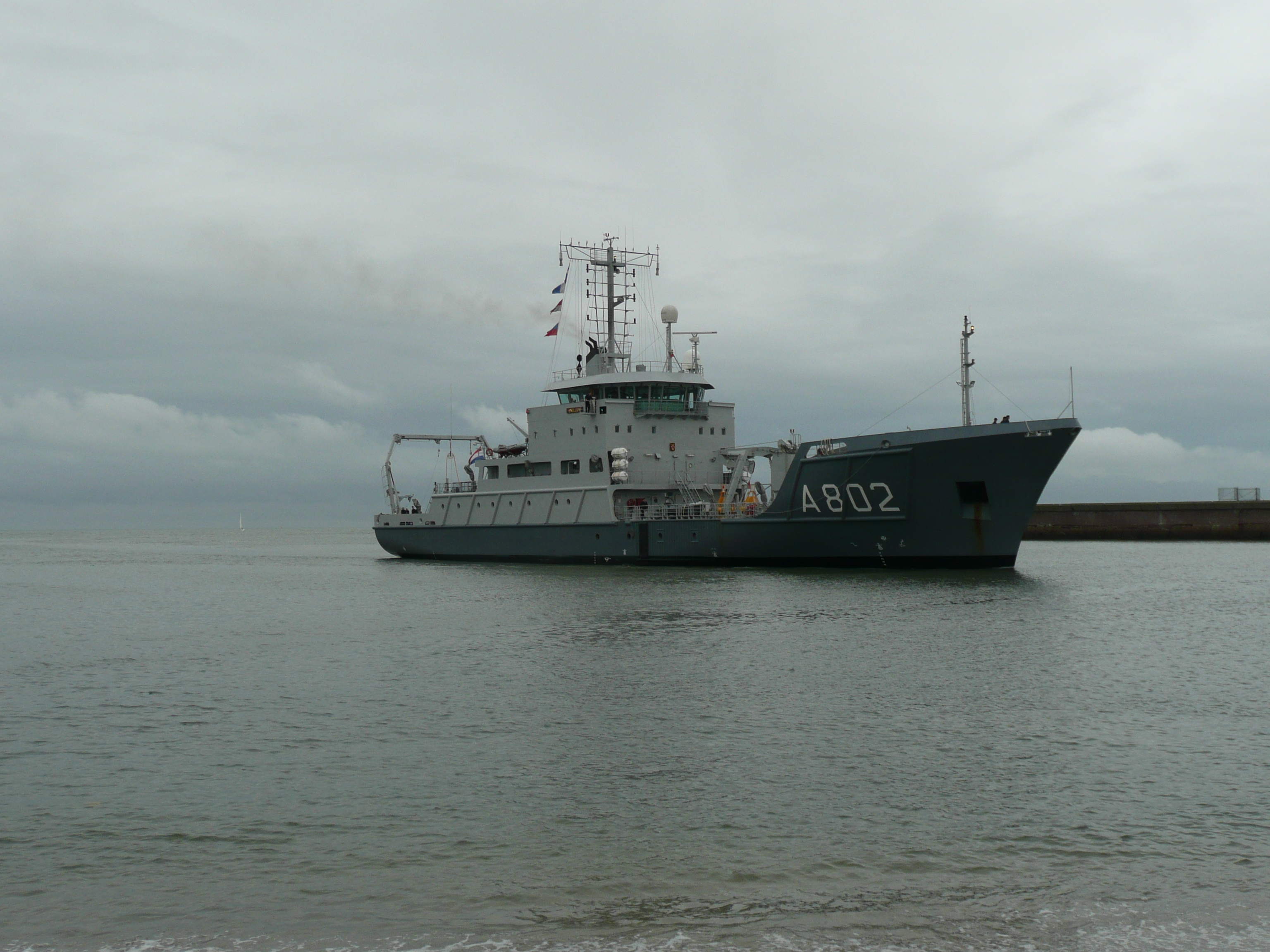
- HNLMS Snellius entering Scheveningen port

Class overview
- Name: Snellius class
- Builders: Damen Schelde Naval Shipbuilding
- Operators: Royal Netherlands Navy
- Preceded by: HNLMS Tydeman; Buyskes class
- Built: 2002–2004
- In commission: 2003-present
- Planned: 2
- Completed: 2
- Active: 2

General characteristics
- Type: Hydrographic survey vessel
- Displacement: 1,875 t (1,845 long tons)
- Length: 81.4 m (267 ft 1 in)
- Beam: 13.1 m (43 ft 0 in)
- Draft: 4 metres (13 ft 1 in)
- Propulsion: 2 diesel engines 1,564 hp (1,166 kW)
- Speed: 12 knots (22 km/h; 14 mph)
- Crew: 18
- Armament: 2 12.7 mm machine guns (optional)

The Snellius class are two hydrographic survey vessel (HOV) ships in service with the hydrographic branch of the Royal Netherlands Navy. The ships were built by the Damen Group, with the hull being built in Romania by Damen Shipyards Galați and the fitting out in the Netherlands by Damen Schelde Naval Shipbuilding.

The current Snellius is the third hydrographic vessel with this name, being named after the mathematician Willebrord Snellius. Named after the hydrographer Johan Lambertus Hendrikus Luymes, the Luymes is also the third hydrographic vessel with this name although the first ship never entered service.

== Design and description ==
Designed for oceanographic and hydrographic research, vessels of the Snellius class measure 75 metres (246 ft 1 in) long with a beam of 13.1 m (43 ft 0 in) and a draught of 4 m (13 ft 1 in). They have fully loaded displacement of 1,875 tonnes (1,845 long tons). The ships are powered by a diesel-electric system composed of two Caterpillar Acert diesel generators producing 1,166 kilowatts (1,564 hp). The generators produce enough electricity to also cover the ships hotel loads.

== Ships in class ==
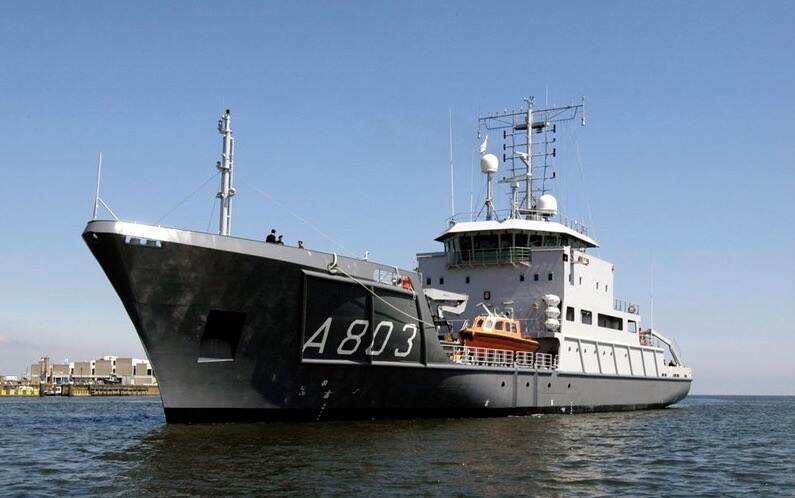
HNLMS Luymes (A803)

Hull number	Name	Builder	Laid down	Launched	Commissioned	Status	Badge	Notes
A802	Snellius	Damen Shipyards Galați (Hull) Damen Schelde Naval Shipbuilding (Fitting out)	25 June 2002	30 April 2003	20 February 2003	In active service		
A803	Luymes	Damen Shipyards Galați (Hull) Damen Schelde Naval Shipbuilding (Fitting out)	25 June 2002		3 June 2004	In active service		

== Construction and career ==
On 25 June 2002 construction officially started for both ships with a keel laying ceremony at the Galați shipyard on behalf of Damen Schelde Naval Shipbuilding. This marked the first occasion of a Dutch naval ship to be partly built in Romania. A year later Snellius arrived in Vlissingen for fitting out.

On 14 July 2021 it was announced that the mid-life update of Snellius was completed by Damen. Work included the replacement or complete overhaul of various systems including SEWACO systems. The maintenance period lasted about a year. Luymes underwent the same maintenance and modernisation work a year earlier.

Both ships are set to be replaced alongside the Mercuur, Pelikaan, Cerberus class, Soemba and the Van Kinsbergen by a common family of ships. The builder of the new ships will be selected in 2024.

- See Auxiliary ship replacement program for more information.
