= Snellius-class hydrographic survey vessel (1950) =

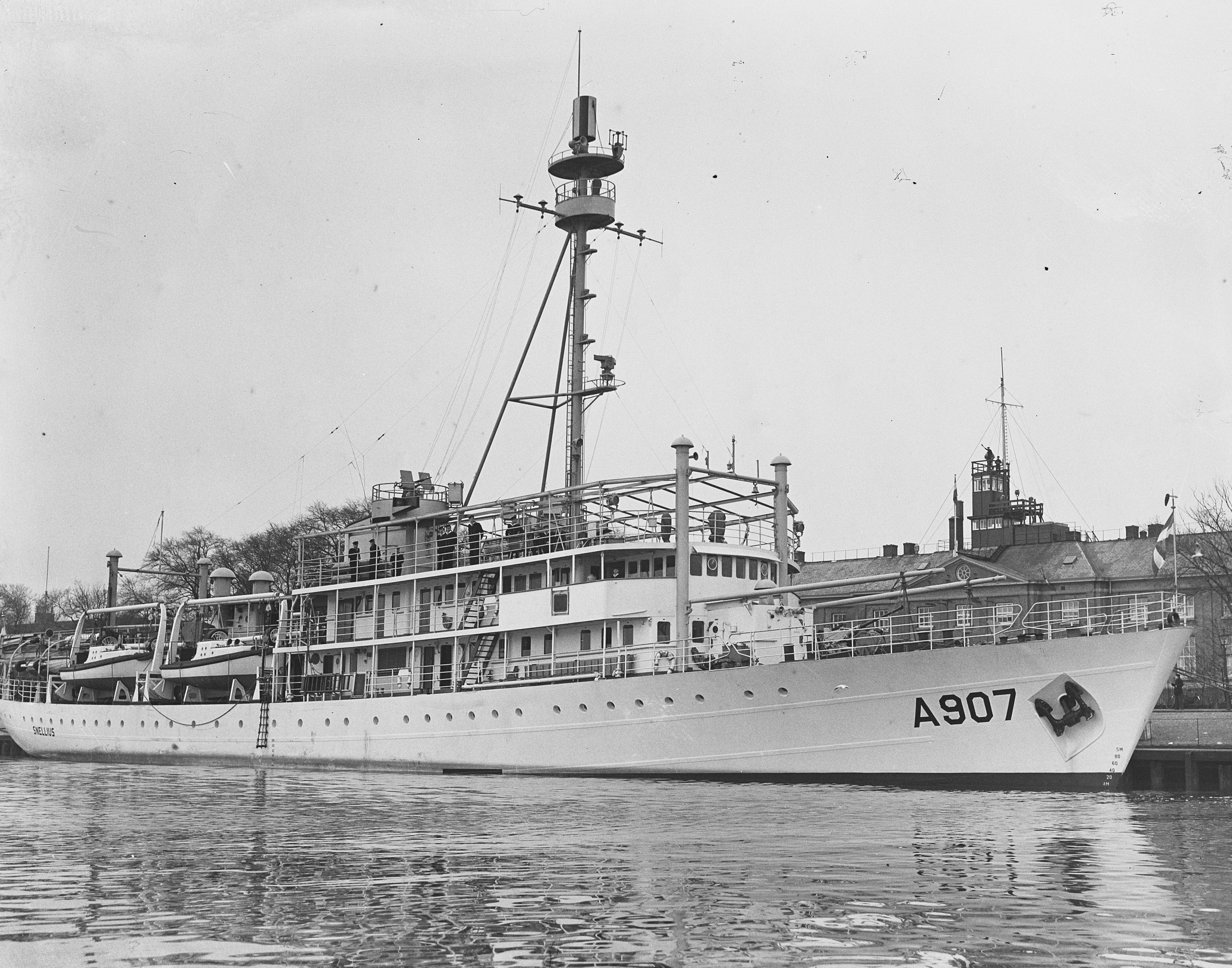
- Snellius

Class overview
- Name: Snellius class
- Builders: P. Smit Jr., Rotterdam; Gusto Shipyard, Schiedam
- Operators: Royal Netherlands Navy
- Succeeded by: Buyskes class; HNLMS Tydeman
- Built: 1949–1952
- In commission: 1952–1977
- Planned: 2
- Completed: 2

General characteristics
- Type: Hydrographic survey vessel
- Displacement: 1,538 t (1,514 long tons)
- Length: 71.4 m (234 ft 3 in)
- Beam: 10.8 m (35 ft 5 in)
- Draft: 4 metres (13 ft 1 in)
- Propulsion: 2 propellers; 2,000 hp (1,500 kW); 2 x Stork diesel engines
- Speed: 15 knots (28 km/h; 17 mph)
- Crew: 108
- Armament: 1 x 40 mm gun; 2 x 20 mm guns; 2 x Depth charge throwers; 1 x Mousetrap

The Snellius class was a ship class of two hydrographic survey vessels that were built in the Netherlands for the Royal Netherlands Navy. They were specially designed to be able to conduct surveys under tropical conditions.

== Design and construction ==
The two hydrographic survey vessels of the Snellius class were built at different shipyards in the Netherlands. Snellius was built at the shipyard of P. Smit Jr. in Rotterdam, while Luymes was built at the shipyard of Gusto in Schiedam.

Both ships of the Snellius class were equipped with a single 40 mm gun, two 20 mm guns, two depth charge throwers and a single mousetrap. Furthermore, they had two 6-cylinder four-stroke Stork diesel engines that could deliver up to 1,000 horsepower (750 kW) each, for a total of 2,000 hp (1,500 kW). This allowed them to reach a maximum speed of 15 knots (28 km/h; 17 mph).

For surveying the ships were equipped with several systems. They had echo sounders that could reach a depth of nine kilometres (5.6 mi) and a sonar that could record unevenness on the sea floor as long as the sea floor was within a distance of one kilometre (0.62 mi) below the ship. Furthermore, a Decca positioning system was installed.

== Service history ==
Between 1952 and 1962 the vessels of the Snellius class mostly performed surveys in Dutch New Guinea. However, during the heightened tensions in 1962 they were also used as patrol ships in Dutch New Guinea. At the end of 1962 Snellius and Luymes left Dutch New Guinea.

Between 1965 and 1969 the survey vessels were active in Suriname and mapped the whole Surinamese continental plate and all the estuaries.

Between 1970 and 1973 Snellius and Luymes alternately participated in an international oceanographic survey that was conducted in the Caribbean Sea, the Gulf of Mexico and the waters between the northern part of South America and the estuary of the Amazon River.

In the 1970s both ships were deemed obsolete and in need of replacement. As a result Luymes was decommissioned in 1973, while Snellius was decommissioned in 1977 after having served as lodging ship between 1973 and 1976.

== Ships in class ==
Snellius-class construction data
| Ship | Pennant No. | Builder | Laid down | Launched | Commissioned | Decommissioned | Fate |
|---|---|---|---|---|---|---|---|
| Snellius | A907 | P. Smit Jr., Rotterdam | 3 January 1949 | 9 December 1950 | 4 February 1952 | 21 January 1977 | Sold to Wilton-Fijenoord on 31 May 1977. |
| Luymes | A902 | Gusto Shipyard, Schiedam | 4 April 1949 | 21 April 1951 | 4 May 1952 | 2 March 1973 | Sold to Pounds Marine Shipping Co. on 29 May 1973. Later rebuild as yacht. |
