= HNLMS Luymes (A803) =

Hydrographic survey vessel

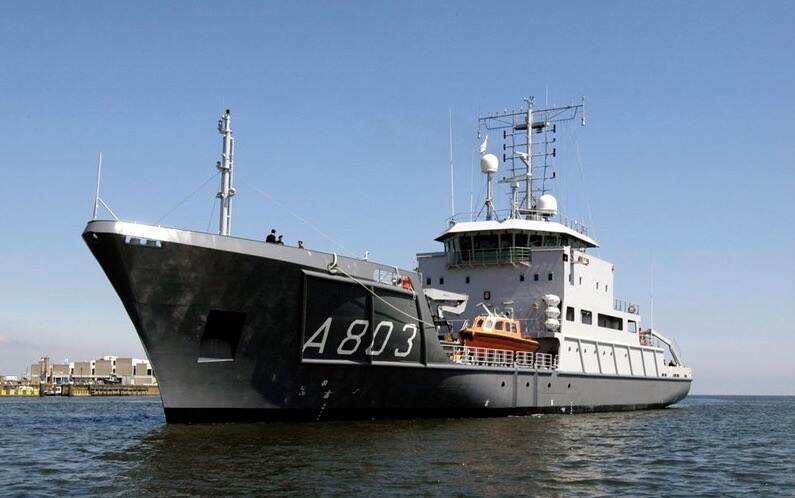
- HNLMS Luymes

History

Netherlands
- Name: HNLMS Luymes
- Laid down: 25 June 2002
- Commissioned: 3 June 2004
- Identification: IMO number: 9271860; MMSI number: 245939000; Callsign: PAUF; Hull number: A-803
- Status: in active service
- Badge

General characteristics
- Class & type: Snellius class
- Displacement: 1,875 t (1,845 long tons)
- Length: 81.4 m (267 ft 1 in)
- Beam: 13.1 m (43 ft 0 in)
- Draught: 4.0 m (13 ft 1 in)
- Propulsion: 2 diesel engines, 1,564 hp (1,166 kW)
- Speed: 12 knots (22 km/h; 14 mph)
- Complement: 18
- Armament: 2 12.7 mm machine guns (optional)

HNLMS Luymes (A803) is a hydrographic survey vessel of the Royal Netherlands Navy. The Luymes has a sister ship, HNLMS Snellius. Luymes is named after the hydrographer Johan Lambertus Hendrikus Luymes (1869–1943) who was head of Hydrography from 1920 to 1934.

== Construction and service ==
The ship was built in the Netherlands from a Romanian-built hull. The current Luymes is the third hydrographic vessel with this name although the first ship of this name never entered service. The ships have different tasks: surveying the sea, operating as guard ship, representing the Netherlands at home and abroad, assisting maritime scientific surveys by the Ministry of Defence and assisting rescue operations.

In January 2025 Luymes was assigned as flagship of the Standing NATO Mine Countermeasures Group 1.
