= HNLMS Snellius (A802) =

Hydrographic survey vessel

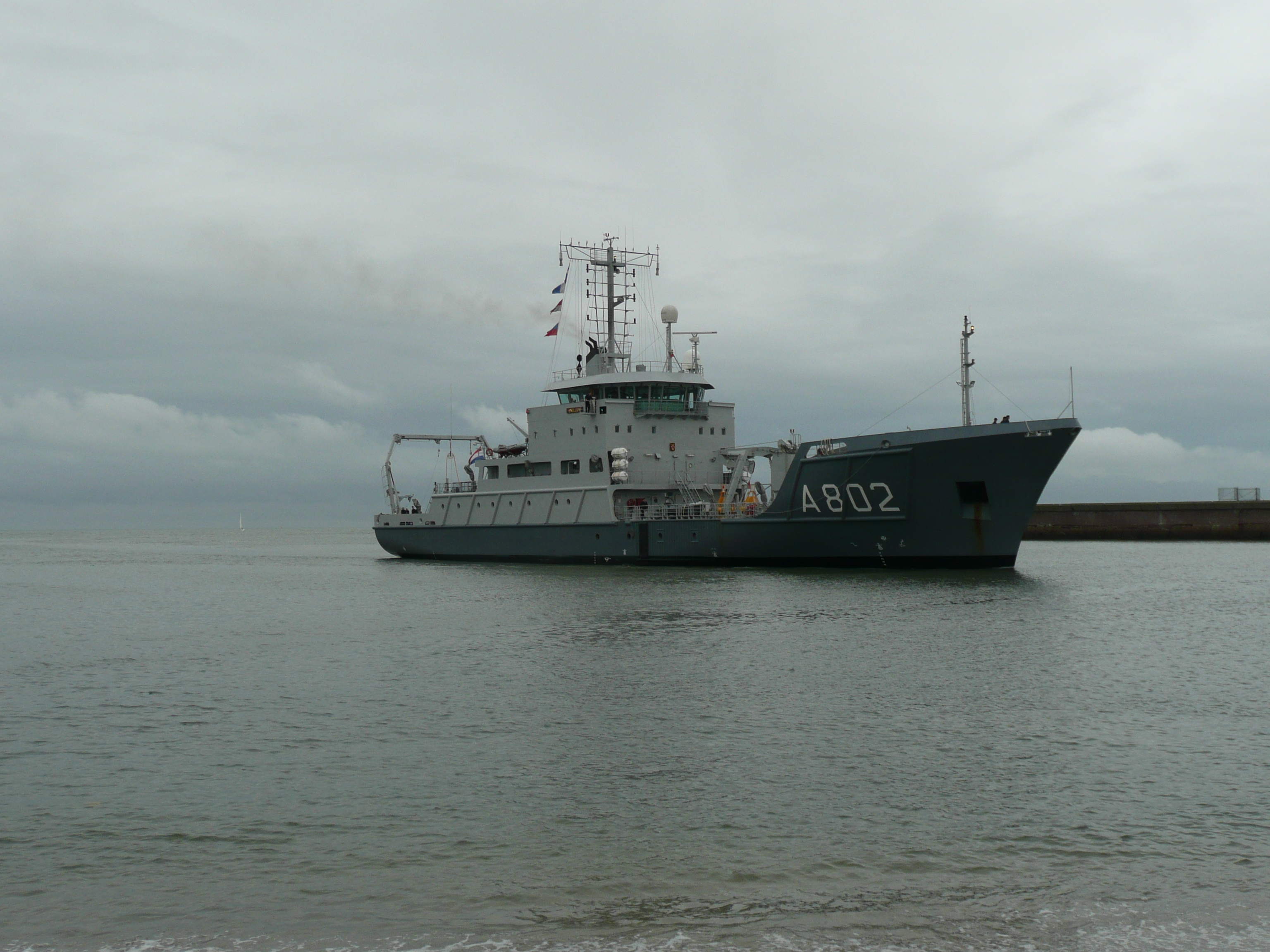
- HNLMS Snellius entering Scheveningen port

History

Netherlands
- Name: HNLMS Snellius
- Laid down: 25 June 2002
- Launched: 30 April 2003
- Commissioned: 20 February 2003
- Identification: IMO number: 9271858; MMSI number: 245690000; Callsign: PAUE; Hull number: A-802
- Status: in active service
- Badge

General characteristics
- Class & type: Snellius class
- Displacement: 1,875 t (1,845 long tons)
- Length: 81.4 m (267 ft 1 in)
- Beam: 13.1 m (43 ft 0 in)
- Draught: 4.0 m (13 ft 1 in)
- Propulsion: 2 diesel engines, 1,564 hp (1,166 kW)
- Speed: 12 knots (22 km/h; 14 mph)
- Complement: 18
- Armament: 2 12.7 mm machine guns (optional)

HNLMS Snellius (A802) is a hydrographic survey vessel of the Royal Netherlands Navy. The Snellius has a sister ship, HNLMS Luymes. Snellius is named after the mathematician Willebrord Snellius who contributed significantly to hydrography.

== Construction and service ==
The ship was completed in the Netherlands from a Romanian-built hull. The ships have different tasks: surveying the sea, operating as guard ship, representing the Netherlands at home and abroad, assisting maritime scientific surveys by the Ministry of Defence and assisting rescue operations.

The current Snellius is the third hydrographic vessel with this name.
