= Bolnes =

Bolnes, municipality of Ridderkerk
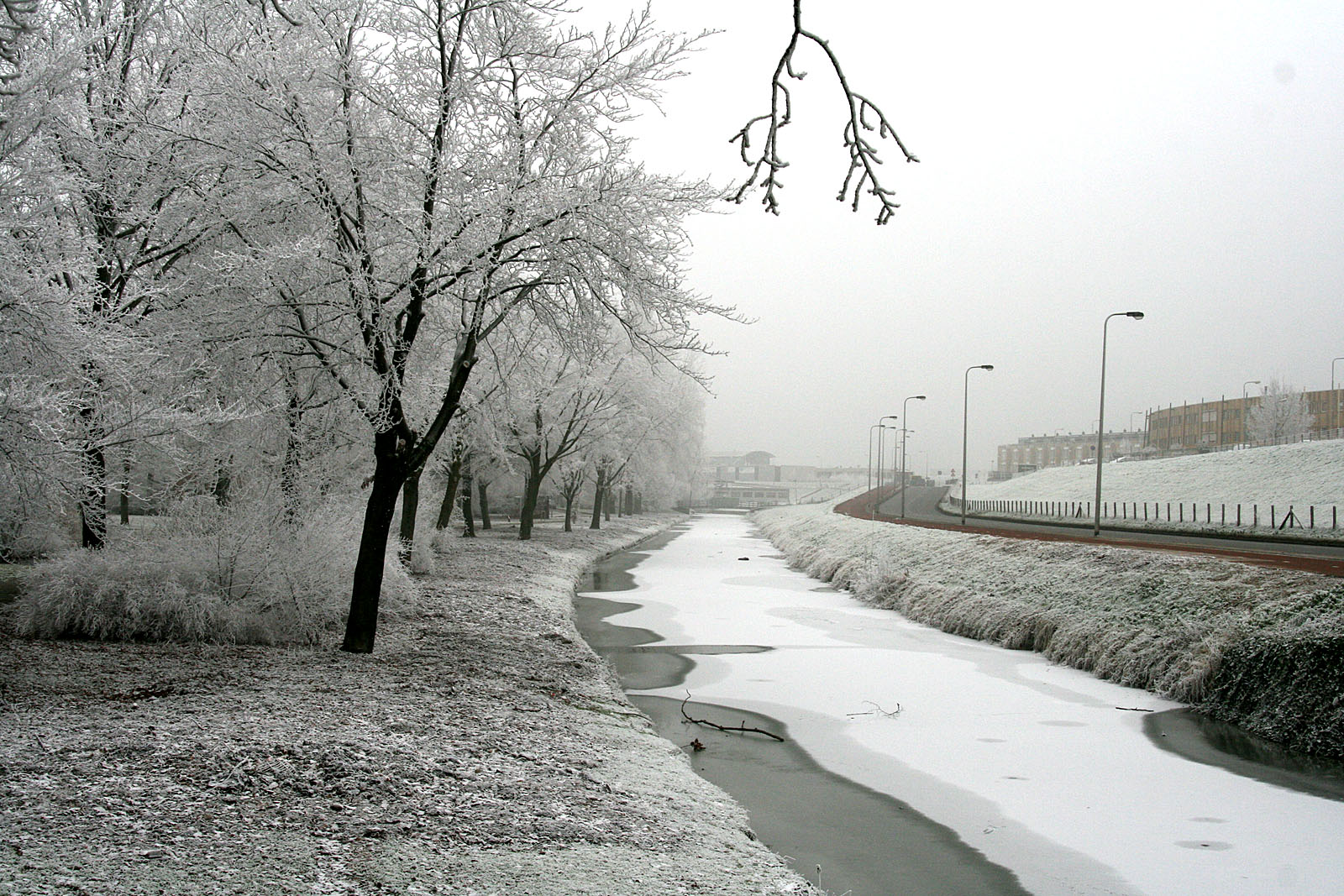
- Flag

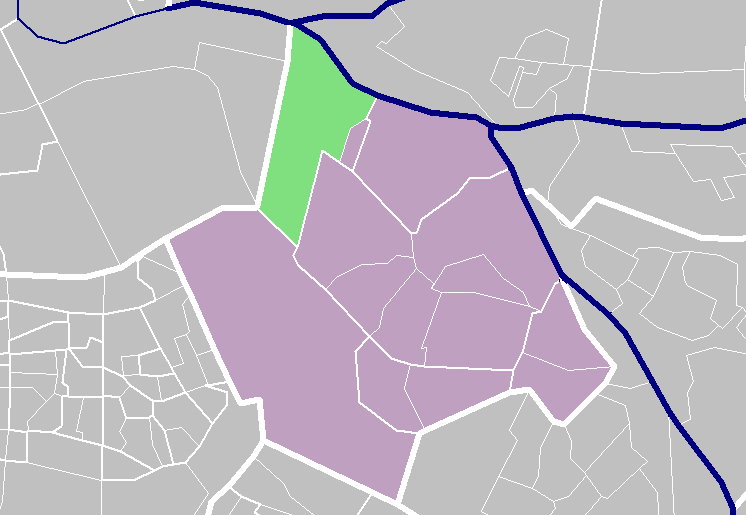
- Coordinates: 51.8947°N 4.5788°E
- Country: Netherlands
- Province: South Holland

Area
  - Total: 2 km^{2} (0.77 sq mi)

Population (1 January 2004)
  - Total: 7,300
- Time zone: UTC+1 (CET)
  - Summer (DST): UTC+2 (CEST)
- Website: www.ridderkerk.nl

Bolnes is a Dutch village in the municipality of Ridderkerk in the province of South Holland. It is situated on the island IJsselmonde on the south bank of the river Nieuwe Maas, just east of the junction with the Hollandse IJssel, bordering on the municipality of Rotterdam.
In 2004, 7300 people lived in Bolnes.

== Economy ==
Intensive farming and especially shipbuilding used to be the main employers, the latter attracting hundreds of migrant workers from Spain in the 1960s. Shipbuilding went into decline in the 1970s and closed down altogether in 1986. Farming has all but disappeared because the built up area was greatly extended during the last 50 years. Bolnes has lost much of its character as a working class village alongside the riverdike; apart from an adequate number of shops and a post office there is little employment in the village itself.

== Transport ==
Many people commute to Ridderkerk, Rotterdam or Dordrecht, via the A16 motorway or otherwise. A regional bus line is the only form of public transport in the village itself. Indeed, the community of Ridderkerk (pop. 45.000) is one of the largest in the country without a single railway station. However, a tram connection is available only a stone's throw away across the border with the municipality of Rotterdam, leading to all sorts of train connections.
