= Operation Sophia =

European Union Military Operation in the Mediterranean Sea

European Union Naval Force Mediterranean
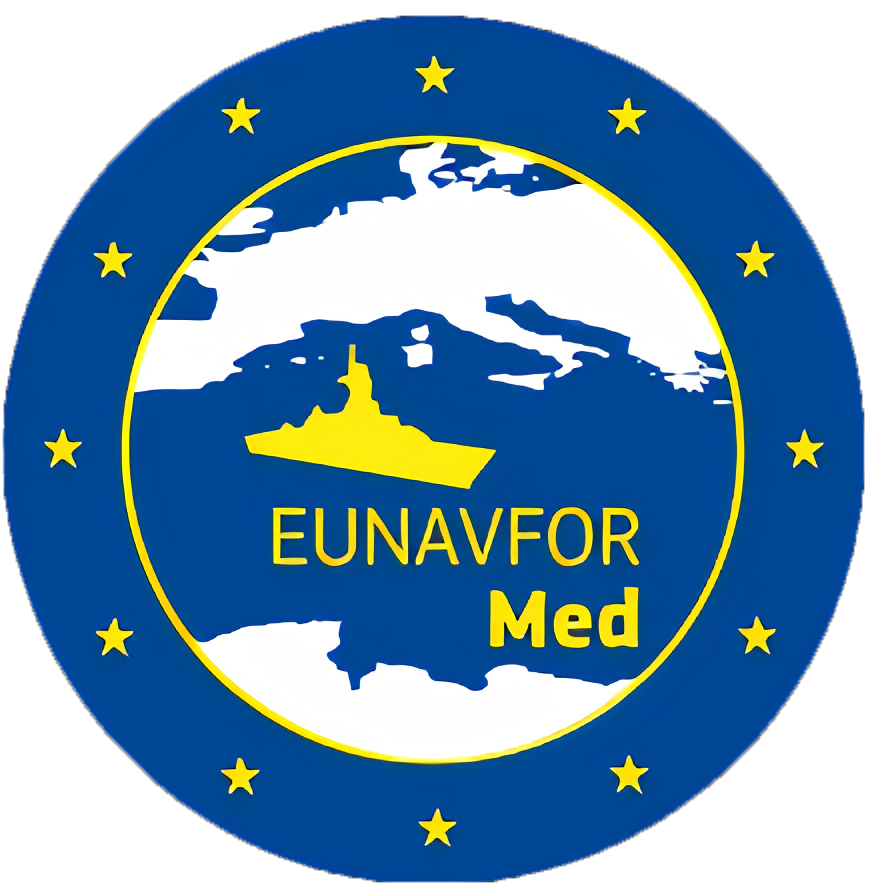
- Emblem of the Operation
- Other name: EUNAVOR MED, Operation Sophia
- Political leader: European Union
- Operation Commander: Rear admiral Fabio Agostini
- Deputy Operation Commander: Rear admiral Jean-Michel Martinet
- Force Commander: Rear Admiral; Ettore Socci
- Dates active: June 22, 2015 – March 31, 2020
- Country: European Union
- Website: Operation Sophia

Operation Sophia, formally European Union Naval Force Mediterranean (EU NAVFOR Med), was a military operation of the European Union that was established as a consequence of the April 2015 Libya migrant shipwrecks with the aim of neutralising established refugee smuggling routes in the Mediterranean. The operational headquarters was located in Rome. The EU mandate for the operation ended on March 31, 2020. Operation Irini is the successor operation.

== Establishment ==
A European Maritime Force operation to combat people smuggling and prevent loss of life in the Mediterranean stemmed from discussions in the European Council on 20 and 23 April 2015, culminating in the issuing of a Council decision on 18 May 2015 to establish a "European Union military operation in the Southern Central Mediterranean". Rear Admiral Enrico Credendino of the Italian Navy was appointed as operation commander. The Political and Security Committee appointed Italian Rear-Admiral Andrea Gueglio as force commander on 17 June 2015, and on 22 June 2015 the European Council approved the launching of EUNAVFOR Med, to take effect that day.

== Name ==
On 24 August 2015, a pregnant Somali woman rescued from a refugee boat by HMS Enterprise gave birth to a child aboard the Schleswig-Holstein, the first child to ever be born aboard a ship of the German Navy. At the suggestion of the attending medical personnel, the child was named Sophia. This was a name associated with German naval ships named Schleswig-Holstein, as the earlier destroyer Schleswig-Holstein had used the radio call sign "Sophie X". This was itself a reference to the early battleship SMS Schleswig-Holstein, which had been dedicated to Princess Louise Sophie of Schleswig-Holstein-Sonderburg-Augustenburg, as have later ships of the name. EUNAVFORMED was subsequently renamed "Operation Sophia", after the baby born aboard Schleswig-Holstein.

I will suggest to Member States that we change the name of our Operation: instead of calling it EUNAVFOR MED, I suggest we use the name: Sophia. To honour the lives of the people we are saving, the lives of people we want to protect, and to pass the message to the world that fighting the smugglers and the criminal networks is a way of protecting human life.

— Federica Mogherini, Rome, EUNAVFOR MED operation Sophia Operational Headquarters, 24 September 2015

== Operation ==
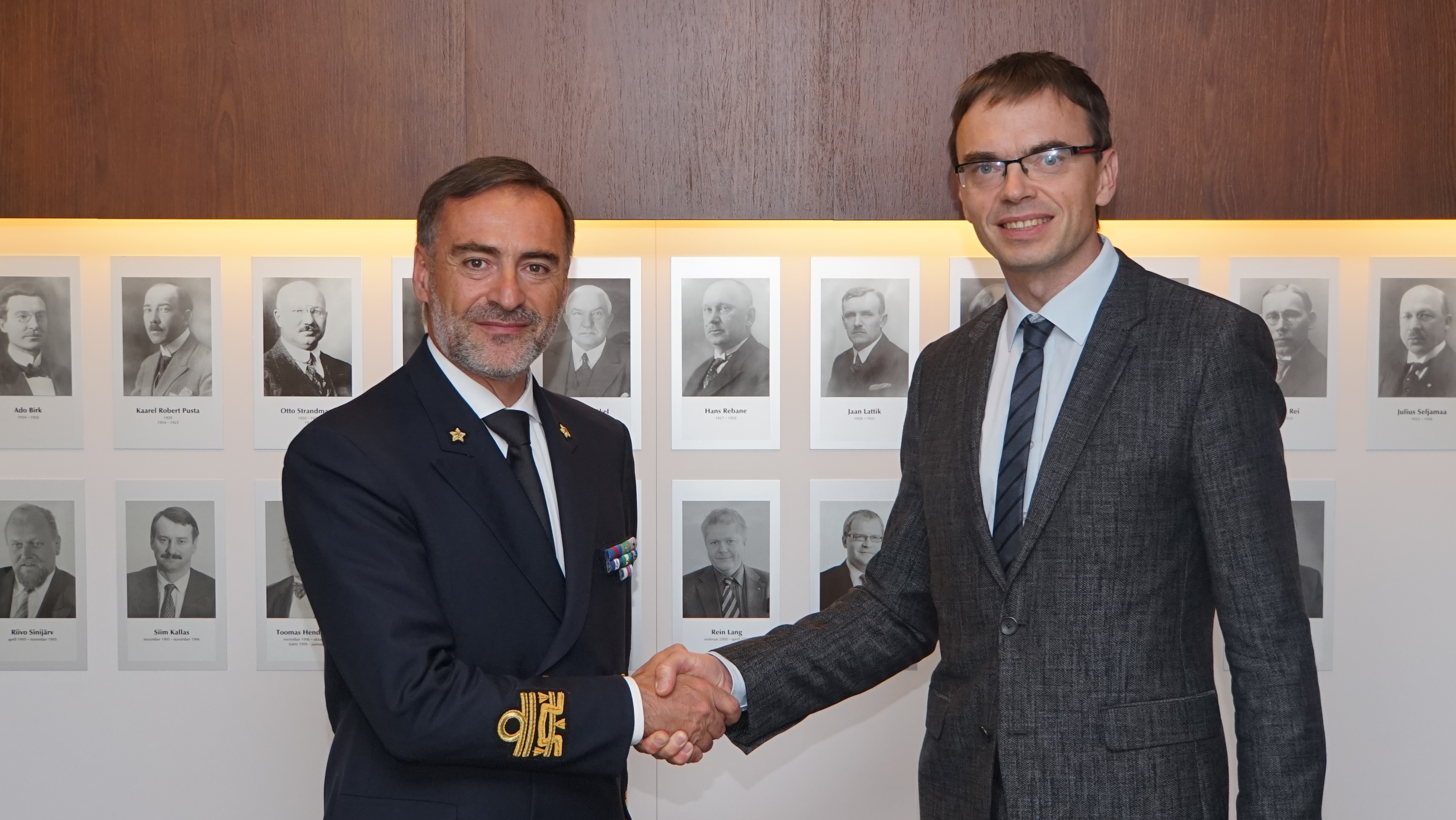
Sven Mikser with Rear Admiral Enrico Credendino

The operation aims to undertake systematic efforts to identify, capture and dispose of vessels as well as enabling assets used or suspected of being used by migrant smugglers or traffickers. The Juncker Commission, in particular the High Representative of the Union for Foreign Affairs and Security Policy, Federica Mogherini, views this operation as a fundamental contribution to fighting instability in the region and as a way to reduce the loss of lives at sea and increase the security of citizens of the European Union.

Operation Sophia consisted of three phases:

- The first phase focused on surveillance and assessment of human smuggling and trafficking networks in the Mediterranean.
- The second stage of the operation provided for the search and, if necessary, diversion of suspicious vessels.
- The third phase allowed the disposal of vessels and related assets, preferably before use, and to apprehend traffickers and smugglers.

There was a common budget of 11.82 million euros for a 12 months period. In addition, military assets and personnel were provided by the contributing states with the running costs and personnel costs being met on a national basis.

By 2016, more than 13,000 migrants had been rescued from the sea in the course of the operation. On 20 June 2016, the Council of the European Union extended Operation Sophia's mandate reinforcing it by adding two supporting tasks: training of the Libyan coastguards and navy, and contributing to the implementation of the UN arms embargo on the high seas off the coast of Libya. The length of the Operation could be continuously renewed by the Council. On 25 July 2017, the Council of the European Union again extended Operation Sophia's mandate, while also amending its mandate to: setting up a monitoring mechanism of trainees to ensure the long-term efficiency of the training of the Libyan Coastguard, conducting new surveillance activities and gather information on illegal trafficking of oil exports from Libya in accordance with UNSCR 2146 and 2362; and enhancing the possibilities for sharing information on human trafficking with member states' law enforcement agencies, FRONTEX and EUROPOL.

== Assets ==
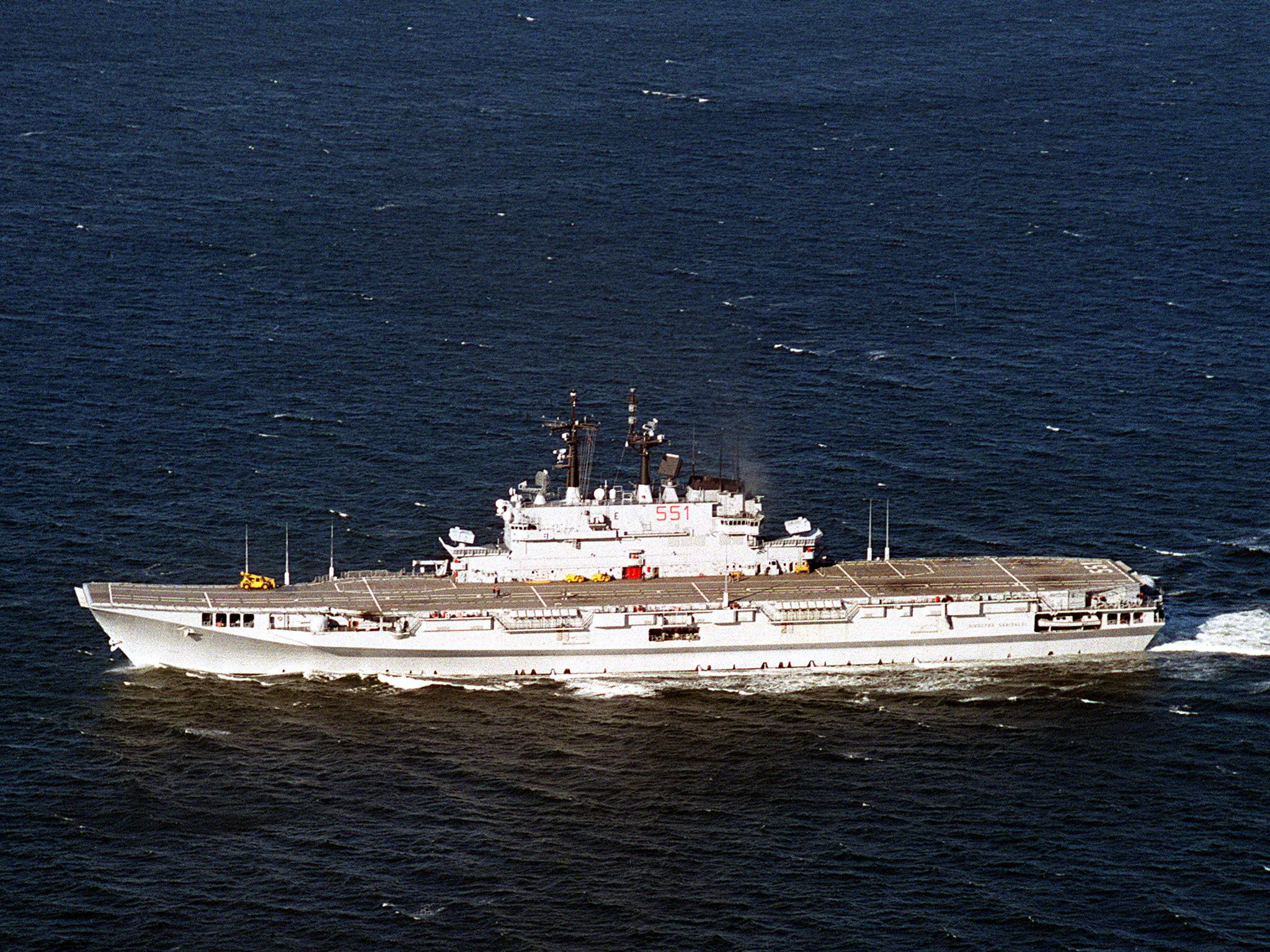
The Italian Navy's aircraft carrier Giuseppe Garibaldi served as the operation's flagship on several occasions

Military contributions from member states to the operation were voluntary at their own expense. However military operations were carried out under the joint command of the EU.

=== Ships ===
- Belgium Karel Doorman-class frigate Leopold I
- Belgium Karel Doorman-class frigate Louise-Marie
- France Gowind-class corvette L'Adroit
- France La Fayette-class frigate Aconit
- France La Fayette-class frigate Courbet
- France D'Estienne d'Orves-class aviso Commandant Birot
- France D'Estienne d'Orves-class aviso Commandant Blaison
- France D'Estienne d'Orves-class aviso Commandant Bouan
- France D'Estienne d'Orves-class aviso Commandant Ducuing
- France D'Estienne d'Orves-class aviso Commandant L'Herminier
- France D'Estienne d'Orves-class aviso Enseigne de vaisseau Jacoubet
- France D'Estienne d'Orves-class aviso Premier-Maître L'Her
- France D'Estienne d'Orves-class aviso Lieutenant de vaisseau Le Hénaff
- Germany Bremen-class frigate Augsburg
- Germany Bremen-class frigate Karlsruhe
- Germany Brandenburg-class frigate Mecklenburg-Vorpommern
- Germany Brandenburg-class frigate Schleswig-Holstein
- Germany Sachsen-class frigate Sachsen
- Germany Braunschweig-class corvette Ludwigshafen am Rhein
- Germany Frankenthal-class minehunter Datteln
- Germany Frankenthal-class minehunter Weilheim
- Germany Elbe-class replenishment ship Main
- Germany Elbe-class replenishment ship Mosel
- Germany Elbe-class replenishment ship Rhein
- Germany Elbe-class replenishment ship Werra
- Germany Berlin-class replenishment ship Berlin
- Germany Berlin-class replenishment ship Frankfurt am Main
- Italy aircraft carrier Cavour
- Italy aircraft carrier Giuseppe Garibaldi
- Italy San Giorgio-class amphibious transport dock San Giorgio
- Italy San Giorgio-class amphibious transport dock San Giusto
- Italy San Giorgio-class amphibious transport dock San Marco
- Italy Maestrale-class frigate Zeffiro
- Italy FREMM multipurpose frigate Luigi Rizzo
- Italy Etna-class replenishment oiler Etna
- Netherlands landing platform dock HNLMS Rotterdam
- (Republic of Ireland) Ireland Samuel Beckett-class offshore patrol vessel LÉ Samuel Beckett
- (Republic of Ireland) Ireland Samuel Beckett-class offshore patrol vessel LÉ James Joyce
- (Republic of Ireland) Ireland Róisín-class patrol vessel LÉ Niamh
- Slovenia Svetlyak-class patrol boat Triglav
- Spain Santa María-class frigate Canarias
- Spain Santa María-class frigate Navarra
- Spain Santa María-class frigate Numancia
- Spain Santa María-class frigate Reina Sofía
- Spain Santa María-class frigate Santa María
- Spain Santa María-class frigate Victoria
- Spain replenishment oiler Cantabria
- Spain Meteoro-class offshore patrol vessel Rayo
- (United Kingdom) UK Type 45 destroyer HMS Diamond
- (United Kingdom) UK Type 23 frigate HMS Richmond
- (United Kingdom) UK Echo-class survey ship HMS Echo
- (United Kingdom) UK Echo-class survey ship HMS Enterprise
- (United Kingdom) UK Bay-Class LSDA RFA Mounts Bay

=== Aircraft ===
- Belgium Alouette III SA316B helicopter
- France Atlantique 2 maritime patrol aircraft
- France Falcon 50 maritime patrol aircraft
- France AS565 Panther helicopter
- Germany Sea Lynx MK88 helicopter
- Greece Erieye EMB-145H AEW&C command and control aircraft
- Italy Two EH101 helicopters
- Italy T AB 212 ASW helicopter
- Italy SH90 NFH helicopter
- Luxembourg Two SW3 Merlin III maritime surveillance aircraft
- Poland An-28B1R BRYZA maritime surveillance aircraft
- Portugal P-3C Orion maritime patrol aircraft
- Spain AB 212 helicopter
- Spain SH-60B LAMPS III helicopter
- Spain P-3M Orion maritime patrol aircraft
- Spain CN-235 VIGMA-D4 maritime surveillance aircraft
- (United Kingdom) UK AW101 (EH 101) Merlin MK 2 helicopter
- (United Kingdom) UK AW159 Wildcat helicopter
- (United Kingdom) UK Lynx MK 8 helicopter

== Criticism ==
The UK's House of Lords has noted in a report that claims this kind of search-and-rescue operation acts as a ‘magnet to migrants and eases the task of smugglers, who would only need their vessels to reach the high seas’ had some validity.

Also the Libyan coastguard has warned that the EU's "Operation Sophia" boosts migrant smuggling, explaining that "People, when they get rescued, call their friends to tell them that there are EU vessels only 20 miles from Libyan waters to save them."

In July 2017, a House of Lords report claimed that the mission had been a failure, as it had managed neither to reduce deaths at sea or disrupt the smuggling network.

== Completion ==
In January 2019, the mission was reduced. In February 2020 a new mission was planned to replace the previous one. On 31 March 2020 the new operation EUNAVFOR MED Operation Irini was launched. In parallel, Operation Sophia permanently ceased its activities.

== See also ==
- Environmental migrant
- Operation Mare Nostrum
- Operation Triton
- European migration crisis
- Migrant vessels on the Mediterranean Sea
