= French aviso Commandant Blaison =

D'Estienne d'Orves-class aviso of the French Navy

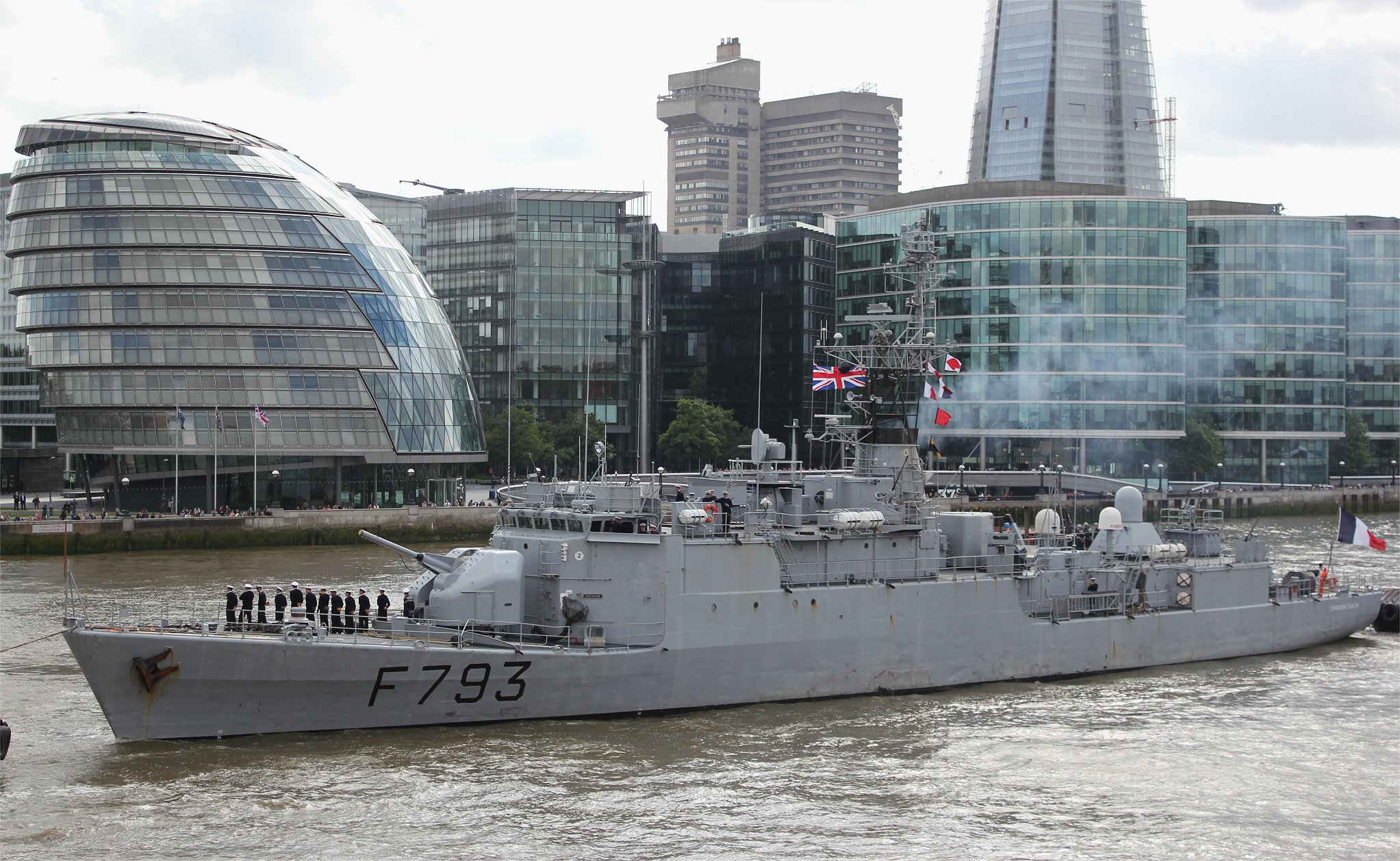
- Commandant Blaison

History

France
- Name: Commandant Blaison
- Namesake: Georges Louis Nicolas Blaison, the commender of the French sub Surcouf when it sank in 1942
- Builder: Arsenal de Lorient, Lorient
- Laid down: 15 November 1979
- Launched: 7 March 1981
- Commissioned: 28 April 1982
- Decommissioned: Expected, 2027
- Home port: Brest
- Identification: Callsign: FABL; Pennant number: F793
- Status: Active

General characteristics
- Class & type: D'Estienne d'Orves-class aviso
- Displacement: 1,100 t (1,100 long tons) standard; 1,270 t (1,250 long tons) full load
- Length: 80 m (262 ft 6 in) oa; 76 m (249 ft 4 in) pp
- Beam: 10.3 m (33 ft 10 in)
- Draught: 5.3 m (17 ft 5 in)
- Propulsion: 2 SEMT Pielstick 12 PC 2 V400 diesel engines; 8,900 kW (12,000 bhp), 2 shafts
- Speed: 23.5 knots (43.5 km/h; 27.0 mph)
- Range: 4,500 nmi (8,300 km; 5,200 mi) at 15 knots (28 km/h; 17 mph)
- Complement: 90
- Sensors & processing systems: 1 Air/surface DRBV 51A sentry radar; 1 DRBC 32E fire control radar; 1 Decca 1226 navigation radar; 1 DUBA 25 hull sonar (active sonar capability reportedly retained after conversion to OPV role)
- Electronic warfare & decoys: 1 ARBR 16 radar interceptor; 2 Dagaie decoy launchers; 1 SLQ-25 Nixie countermeasure system
- Armament: 2 Exocet MM38 SSMs (removed from French ships when reclassified as OPVs); 1 × 100 mm CADAM gun turret with Najir fire control system and CMS LYNCEA; 2 × 20 mm modèle F2 guns; 4 × 12.7 mm machine guns; 4 × L3 or L5 type torpedoes in four fixed catapults (removed from French ships when reclassified as OPVs); 1 × sextuple Bofors 375 mm rocket launcher (removed from French ships when reclassified as OPVs)

Commandant Blaison (F793) is a D'Estienne d'Orves-class aviso in the French Navy.

== Design ==
Armed by a crew of 90 sailors, these vessels have the reputation of being among the most difficult in bad weather. Their high windage makes them particularly sensitive to pitch and roll as soon as the sea is formed.

Their armament, consequent for a vessel of this tonnage, allows them to manage a large spectrum of missions. During the Cold War, they were primarily used to patrol the continental shelf of the Atlantic Ocean in search of Soviet Navy submarines. Due to the poor performance of the hull sonar, as soon as an echo appeared, the reinforcement of an ASM frigate was necessary to chase it using its towed variable depth sonar.

Their role as patrollers now consists mainly of patrols and assistance missions, as well as participation in UN missions (blockades, flag checks) or similar marine policing tasks (fight against drugs, extraction of nationals, fisheries control, etc.). The Exocet missiles have been landed, but they carry several machine guns which are more suited to their new missions.

Its construction cost was estimated at 270,000,000 French francs.

== Construction and career ==
Commandant Blaison was laid down on 15 November 1979 at Arsenal de Lorient, Lorient. Launched on 7 March 1981 and commissioned on 28 April 1982.

With the retirement of her sister ships, Enseigne de vaisseau Jacoubet and Commandant Bouan in 2026, she is the last vessel of her class in active service with the French Navy. She is scheduled to be withdrawn from service in 2027 and be replaced by one of a new class of ocean-going Patrol Vessels (the Patrouilleurs Hauturiers).
