= French aviso Enseigne de vaisseau Jacoubet =

D'Estienne d'Orves-class aviso of the French Navy

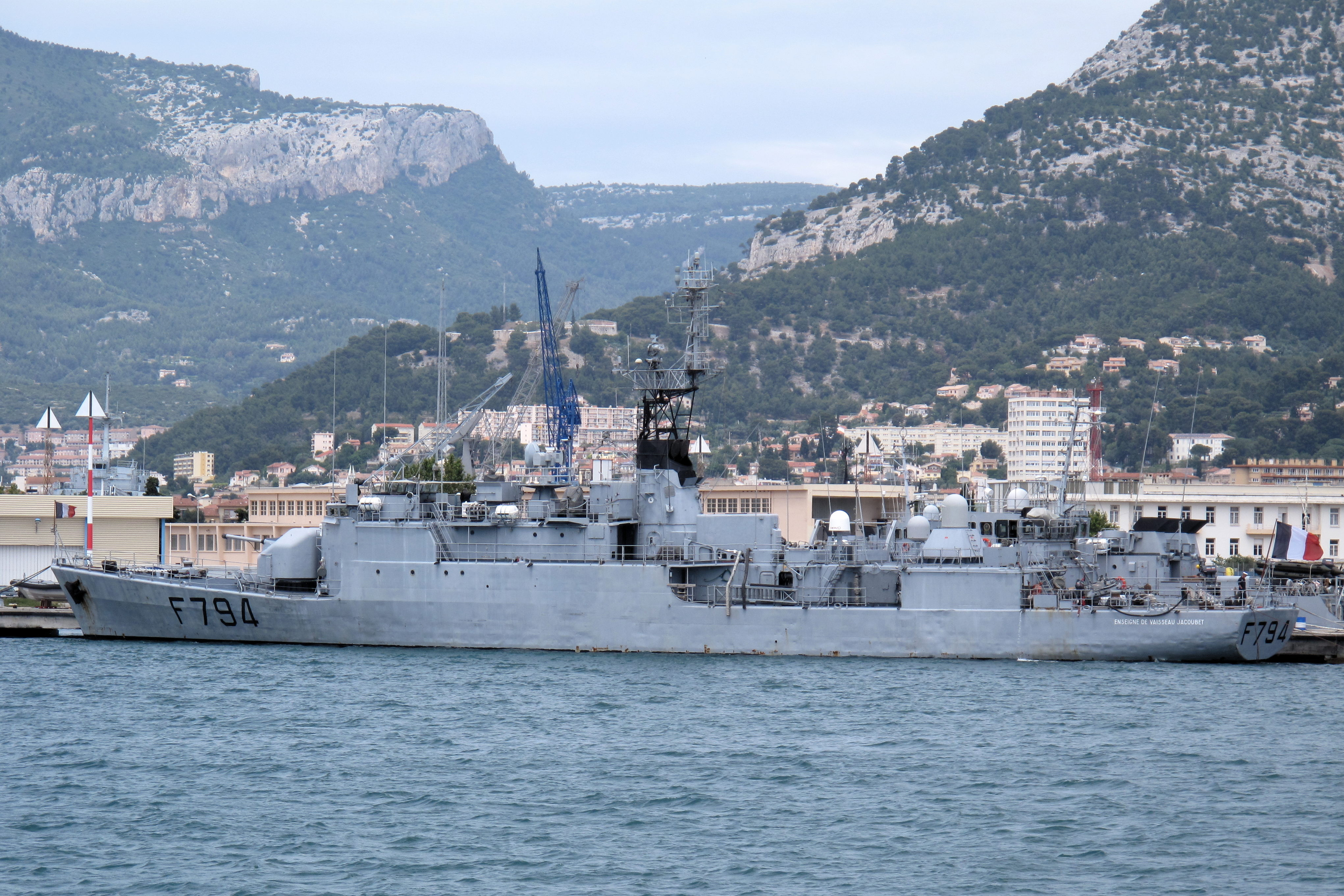
- Enseigne de vaisseau Jacoubet

History

France
- Name: Enseigne de vaisseau Jacoubet
- Namesake: André Jacoubet
- Builder: Arsenal de Lorient, Lorient
- Laid down: April 1979
- Launched: 29 September 1981
- Commissioned: 23 October 1982
- Decommissioned: 18 June 2026
- Home port: Brest
- Identification: Callsign: FAJC; Pennant number: F794
- Status: Decommissioned

General characteristics
- Class & type: D'Estienne d'Orves-class aviso
- Displacement: 1,100 t (1,100 long tons) standard; 1,270 t (1,250 long tons) full load
- Length: 80 m (262 ft 6 in) oa; 76 m (249 ft 4 in) pp
- Beam: 10.3 m (33 ft 10 in)
- Draught: 5.3 m (17 ft 5 in)
- Propulsion: 2 SEMT Pielstick 12 PC 2 V400 diesel engines; 8,900 kW (12,000 bhp), 2 shafts
- Speed: 23.5 knots (43.5 km/h; 27.0 mph)
- Range: 4,500 nmi (8,300 km; 5,200 mi) at 15 knots (28 km/h; 17 mph)
- Complement: 90
- Sensors & processing systems: 1 Air/surface DRBV 51A sentry radar; 1 DRBC 32E fire control radar; 1 Decca 1226 navigation radar; 1 DUBA 25 hull sonar (active sonar capability reportedly retained after conversion to OPV role)
- Electronic warfare & decoys: 1 ARBR 16 radar interceptor; 2 Dagaie decoy launchers; 1 SLQ-25 Nixie countermeasure system
- Armament: 2 Exocet MM38 SSMs (removed from French ships when reclassified as OPVs); 1 × 100 mm CADAM gun turret with Najir fire control system and CMS LYNCEA; 2 × 20 mm modèle F2 guns; 4 × 12.7 mm machine guns; 4 × L3 or L5 type torpedoes in four fixed catapults (removed from French ships when reclassified as OPVs); 1 × sextuple Bofors 375 mm rocket launcher (removed from French ships when reclassified as OPVs)

Enseigne de vaisseau Jacoubet (F794) was a D'Estienne d'Orves-class aviso in the French Navy.

== Design ==
Armed by a crew of 90 sailors, these vessels have the reputation of being among the most difficult in bad weather. Their high windage makes them particularly sensitive to pitch and roll as soon as the sea is formed.

Their armament, consequent for a vessel of this tonnage, allows them to manage a large spectrum of missions. During the Cold War, they were primarily used to patrol the continental shelf of the Atlantic Ocean in search of Soviet Navy submarines. Due to the poor performance of the hull sonar, as soon as an echo appeared, the reinforcement of an ASM frigate was necessary to chase it using its towed variable depth sonar.

Their role as patrollers now consists mainly of patrols and assistance missions, as well as participation in UN missions (blockades, flag checks) or similar marine policing tasks (fight against drugs, extraction of nationals, fisheries control, etc.). The mer-mer 38 or mer-mer 40 missiles have been landed, but they carry several machine guns and machine guns, more suited to their new missions.

Its construction cost was estimated at 270,000,000 French francs.

== Construction and career ==
Enseigne de vaisseau Jacoubet was laid down in April 1979 at Arsenal de Lorient, Lorient. The aviso was launched on 29 September 1981 and commissioned on 23 October 1982.

In January 2013, during Operation Serval in Mali, Enseigne de vaisseau Jacoubet escorted the ro-ro vessel MN Eider chartered by the French Navy, which was transporting equipment to Senegal.

In 2014, the ship participated in Operation Corymbe, off West Africa.

In May 2016, she participated in search operations for EgyptAir Flight 804, which disappeared on 19 May 2016 in the eastern Mediterranean Sea.

On 15 February 2019, the vessel joined the European operation EU Navfor Med in order to fight against trafficking in the Mediterranean. The ship left the operation on March 14, after 28 days of engagement. She was transferred from her home port of Toulon in July 2020 to Brest. In 2022, it was indicated that the ship would be equipped with the SMDM (navy mini-drone system) to enhance her surveillance capabilities. She began a short upgrade from November 2022 to February 2023 to integrate the new system.

Enseigne de vaisseau Jacoubet was withdrawn from service in 2026 and will eventually be replaced by one of a new class of ocean-going patrol vessels (the Patrouilleurs Hauturiers).
