= French aviso Lieutenant de vaisseau Lavallée =

D'Estienne d'Orves-class aviso of the French Navy

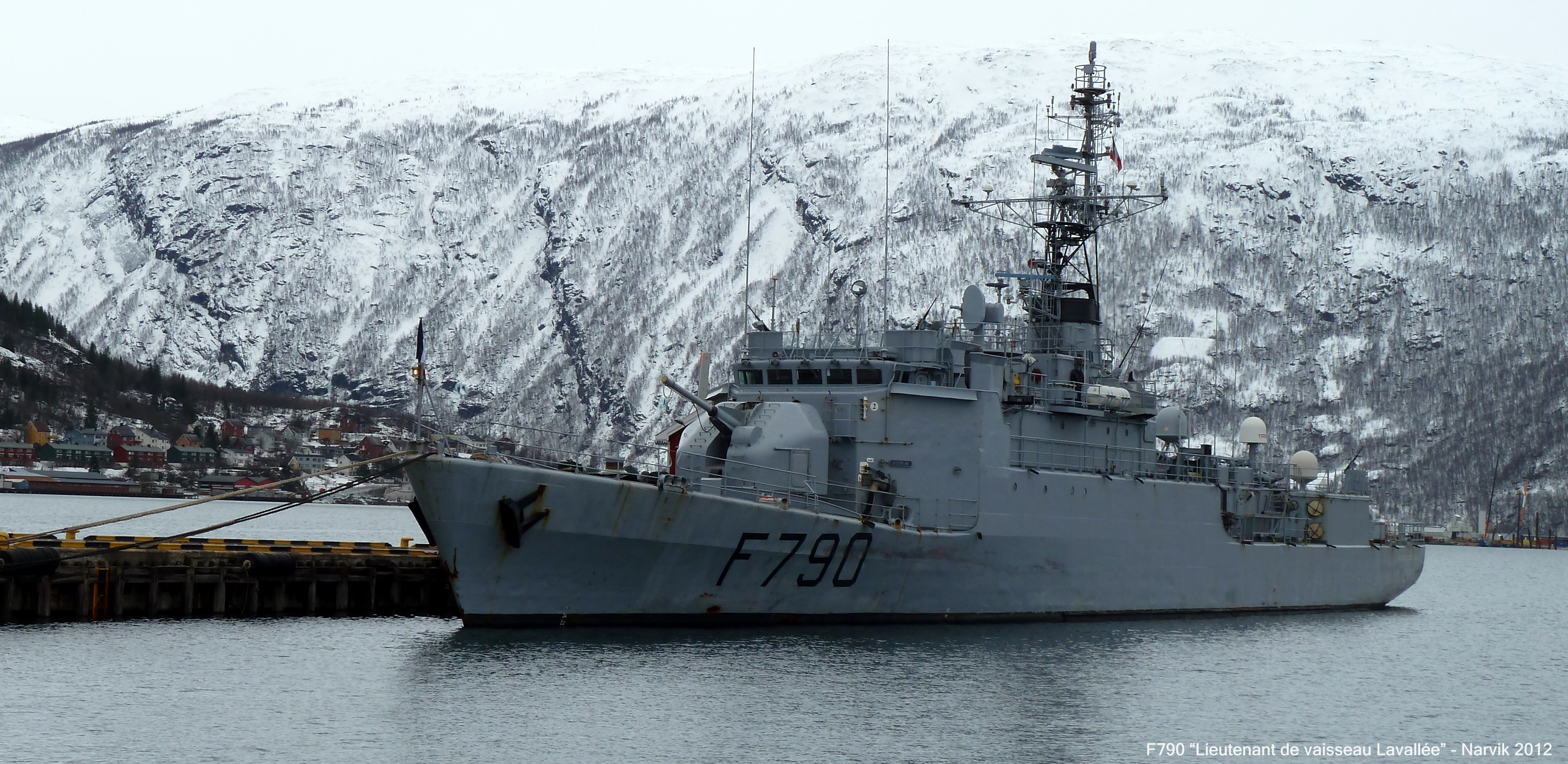
- Lieutenant de vaisseau Lavallée

History

France
- Name: Lieutenant de vaisseau Lavallée
- Builder: Arsenal de Lorient, Lorient
- Laid down: 11 November 1977
- Launched: 29 May 1979
- Commissioned: 16 August 1980
- Decommissioned: 2 July 2018
- Identification: Callsign: FAVL; Pennant number: F790
- Status: Decommissioned

General characteristics
- Class & type: D'Estienne d'Orves-class aviso
- Displacement: 1,100 t (1,100 long tons) standard; 1,270 t (1,250 long tons) full load
- Length: 80 m (262 ft 6 in) oa; 76 m (249 ft 4 in) pp
- Beam: 10.3 m (33 ft 10 in)
- Draught: 5.3 m (17 ft 5 in)
- Propulsion: 2 SEMT Pielstick 12 PC 2 V400 diesel engines; 8,900 kW (12,000 bhp), 2 shafts
- Speed: 23.5 knots (43.5 km/h; 27.0 mph)
- Range: 4,500 nmi (8,300 km; 5,200 mi) at 15 knots (28 km/h; 17 mph)
- Complement: 90
- Sensors & processing systems: 1 Air/surface DRBV 51A sentry radar; 1 DRBC 32E fire control radar; 1 Decca 1226 navigation radar; 1 DUBA 25 hull sonar
- Electronic warfare & decoys: 1 ARBR 16 radar interceptor; 2 Dagaie decoy launchers; 1 SLQ-25 Nixie countermeasure system
- Armament: 2 Exocet MM38 SSMs (removed from French ships when reclassified as OPVs); 1 × 100 mm CADAM gun turret with Najir fire control system and CMS LYNCEA; 2 × 20 mm modèle F2 guns; 4 × 12.7 mm machine guns; 4 × L3 or L5 type torpedoes in four fixed catapults (removed from French ships when reclassified as OPVs); 1 × sextuple Bofors 375 mm rocket launcher (removed from French ships when reclassified as OPVs)

Lieutenant de vaisseau Lavallée (F790) was a D'Estienne d'Orves-class aviso in the French Navy. The ship's name paid tribute to the resistance fighter shot in deportation in 1944.

== Design ==
Armed by a crew of 90 sailors, these vessels have the reputation of being among the most difficult in bad weather. Their high windage makes them particularly sensitive to pitch and roll as soon as the sea is formed.

Their armament, consequent for a vessel of this tonnage, allows them to manage a large spectrum of missions. During the Cold War, they were primarily used to patrol the continental shelf of the Atlantic Ocean in search of Soviet Navy submarines. Due to the poor performance of the hull sonar, as soon as an echo appeared, the reinforcement of an ASM frigate was necessary to chase it using its towed variable depth sonar.

Their role as patrollers now consists mainly of patrols and assistance missions, as well as participation in UN missions (blockades, flag checks) or similar marine policing tasks (fight against drugs, extraction of nationals, fisheries control, etc.). The mer-mer 38 or mer-mer 40 missiles have been landed, but they carry several machine guns and machine guns, more suited to their new missions.

Its construction cost was estimated at 270,000,000 French francs.

== Construction and career ==
Lieutenant de vaisseau Lavallée was laid down on 11 November 1977 at Arsenal de Lorient, Lorient. Launched on 29 May 1979 and commissioned on 16 August 1980.

In 2011, she participated in Operation Harmattan. During this deployment, he fired numerous shells against the ground and participated in the destruction of numerous military vehicles. The day of 11 September was marked by counter battery fire from the earth. These surrounding shots fell near the building, at a distance of between 50 and 200 m. As such, the building receives the cross of military value.

On 13 November 2013, the vessel was in a maritime surveillance operation on the approaches to Brest accompanied by the service vessel Malabar and the mine hunter Céphée.

From the end of 2014, it participated in the Corymbe Mission, a naval device aimed at ensuring the permanent presence of a vessel in the Gulf of Guinea and off the coast of West Africa.

It was on the ship that on 8 December 2017, the resumption of official diplomatic exchanges between the French ambassador in Dakar, Christophe Bigot, and the new Gambian government, following the fall of the ex-dictator Yahya Jammeh in January 2017 which led to the reopening of the French diplomatic branch in November of the same year.

She was decommissioned on 2 July 2018.
