= French aviso Commandant Birot =

D'Estienne d'Orves-class boat of the French Navy

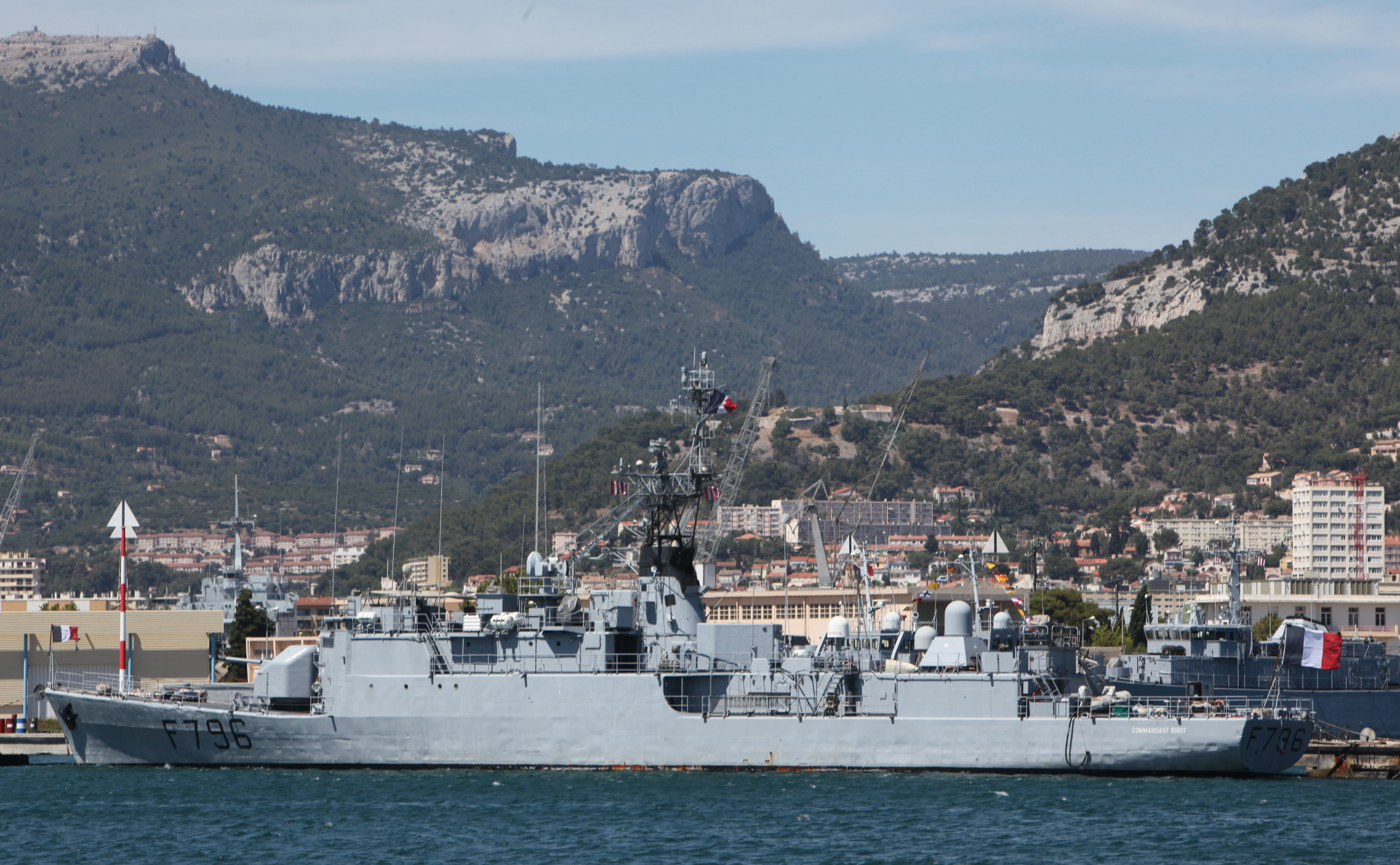
- Commandant Birot

History

France
- Name: Commandant Birot
- Namesake: Roger Birot
- Builder: Arsenal de Lorient, Lorient
- Laid down: 23 March 1981
- Launched: 22 May 1982
- Commissioned: 14 March 1984
- Decommissioned: 3 October 2025
- Home port: Toulon
- Identification: Callsign: FACB; Pennant number: F796
- Status: Decommissioned

General characteristics
- Class & type: D'Estienne d'Orves-class aviso
- Displacement: 1,100 t (1,100 long tons) standard; 1,270 t (1,250 long tons) full load
- Length: 80 m (262 ft 6 in) oa; 76 m (249 ft 4 in) pp
- Beam: 10.3 m (33 ft 10 in)
- Draught: 5.3 m (17 ft 5 in)
- Propulsion: 2 SEMT Pielstick 12 PC 2 V400 diesel engines; 8,900 kW (12,000 bhp), 2 shafts
- Speed: 23.5 knots (43.5 km/h; 27.0 mph)
- Range: 4,500 nmi (8,300 km; 5,200 mi) at 15 knots (28 km/h; 17 mph)
- Complement: 90
- Sensors & processing systems: 1 Air/surface DRBV 51A sentry radar; 1 DRBC 32E fire control radar; 1 Decca 1226 navigation radar; 1 DUBA 25 hull sonar (active sonar capability reportedly retained after conversion to OPV role)
- Electronic warfare & decoys: 1 ARBR 16 radar interceptor; 2 Dagaie decoy launchers; 1 SLQ-25 Nixie countermeasure system
- Armament: 2 Exocet MM38 SSMs (removed from French ships when reclassified as OPVs); 1 × 100 mm CADAM gun turret with Najir fire control system and CMS LYNCEA; 2 × 20 mm modèle F2 guns; 4 × 12.7 mm machine guns; 4 × L3 or L5 type torpedoes in four fixed catapults (removed from French ships when reclassified as OPVs); 1 × sextuple Bofors 375 mm rocket launcher (removed from French ships when reclassified as OPVs)

Commandant Birot (F796) was a D'Estienne d'Orves-class aviso in the French Navy.

== Design ==
Armed by a crew of 90 sailors, these vessels have the reputation of being among the most difficult in bad weather. Their high windage makes them particularly sensitive to pitch and roll as soon as the sea is formed.

Their armament, consequent for a vessel of this tonnage, allows them to manage a large spectrum of missions. During the Cold War, they were primarily used to patrol the continental shelf of the Atlantic Ocean in search of Soviet Navy submarines. Due to the poor performance of the hull sonar, as soon as an echo appeared, the reinforcement of an ASM frigate was necessary to chase it using its towed variable depth sonar.

Their role as patrollers now consists mainly of patrols and assistance missions, as well as participation in UN missions (blockades, flag checks) or similar marine policing tasks (fight against drugs, extraction of nationals, fisheries control, etc.). The mer-mer 38 or mer-mer 40 missiles have been landed, but they carry several machine guns and machine guns, more suited to their new missions.

Its construction cost was estimated at 270,000,000 French francs.

== Construction and career ==
Commandant Birot was laid down on 23 March 1981 at Arsenal de Lorient, Lorient. Launched on 22 May 1982 and commissioned on 14 March 1984.

On 13 January 2014, the ship was cited to the order of the division for having distinguished himself in the conduct and successful boarding of the Luna S, a vessel filled with cannabis arrested off the coast of Algeria. September 8 to 13, 2013.

In May 2015, she participated in Operation Triton. She collects 217 castaways on May 2. She saved 297 migrants on May 20, 2015.

On May 23, 2019, she participated, with the patroller Jean-François Deniau, in the seizure of 7.4 tonnes of cannabis as part of a joint operation between the Customs and the Navy off the coast of France. In November / December 2019, the ship patroled the Black Sea and conducted naval diplomacy and intelligence missions.

In 2022, it was indicated that the ship would be equipped with the SMDM (navy mini-drone system) to enhance her surveillance capabilities.

In May 2025, Commandant Birot conducted her final cruise embarking 18 former commanders, including Admiral Nicolas Vaujour Chief of the Naval Staff. She decommissioned from service in October 2025 and is to be replaced by one of a new class of ocean-going Patrol Vessels (the Patrouilleurs Hauturiers), which are projected to enter service from 2027.
