= EgyptAir Flight 804 =

2016 aviation accident in the Mediterranean Sea

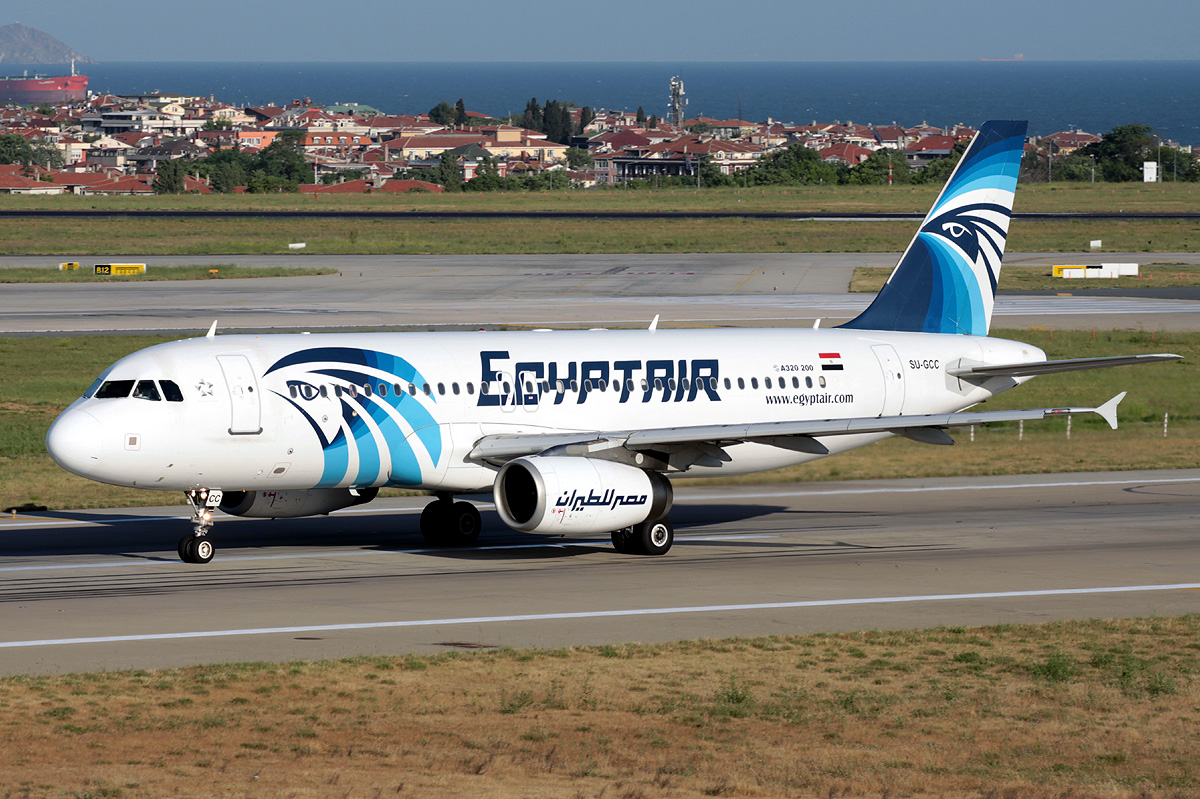
- SU-GCC, the aircraft involved in the accident, pictured in 2013

Accident
- Date: 19 May 2016
- Summary: In-flight fire; cause of fire disputed
- Site: Mediterranean Sea; 33.6757°N 28.7924°E (Note: Last known location)

Aircraft
- Aircraft type: Airbus A320-232
- Operator: EgyptAir
- IATA flight No.: MS804
- ICAO flight No.: MSR804
- Call sign: EGYPTAIR 804
- Registration: SU-GCC
- Flight origin: Charles de Gaulle Airport, Paris, France
- Destination: Cairo International Airport, Cairo, Egypt
- Occupants: 66
- Passengers: 56
- Crew: 10
- Fatalities: 66
- Survivors: 0

EgyptAir Flight 804 was a regularly scheduled international passenger flight from Paris Charles de Gaulle Airport to Cairo International Airport, operated by EgyptAir. On 19 May 2016 at 02:33 Egypt Standard Time (UTC+2), the Airbus A320 crashed into the Mediterranean Sea, killing all 66 occupants on board.

No mayday call was received by air traffic control, although signals that smoke had been detected in one of the aircraft's lavatories and in the avionics bay were automatically transmitted via ACARS shortly before the aircraft disappeared from radar. The last communications from the aircraft prior to its submersion were two transmissions from its emergency locator transmitter that were received by the International Cospas-Sarsat Programme. Debris from the aircraft was found in the Mediterranean Sea approximately 290 km (180 mi) north of Alexandria. Nearly four weeks after the crash, several main sections of wreckage were identified on the seabed, and both flight recorders were recovered in a multinational search and recovery operation. On 29 June, Egyptian officials announced that the flight data recorder data indicated smoke in the aircraft, and that soot plus damage from high temperatures was found on some of the wreckage from the front section of the aircraft.

On 30 October 2024, two reports were released with conflicting conclusions about the cause of the crash. Egypt's Civil Aviation Authority, which headed the investigation, concluded that the crash was the result of an explosion occurring in the galley near the cockpit, which was rapidly engulfed by smoke and fire, exacerbated by oxygen flow being present. The French investigative agency BEA disagreed with this conclusion, instead finding that the fire was most likely a result of a fault in the oxygen mask.

== Background ==
=== Aircraft ===
The aircraft involved, manufactured in 2003, was an Airbus A320-232, (Note: The aircraft was an Airbus A320-200 model, also known as the A320ceo to distinguish it from the newer A320neo; the suffix -32 specifies it was fitted with IAE V2527-A5 engines.) registered as SU-GCC with serial number 2088. It was equipped with two IAE V2527-A5 engines. The Airbus A320, introduced in 1988, is a twin-engine aircraft that can seat up to 180 passengers in a high-density layout, although it typically seats 150 passengers, and has a range of up to 6,480 kilometres (3,500 nmi). The aircraft involved was delivered new to Egyptair in November 2003, and had logged 48,052 flight hours in 20,773 flight cycles since its manufacture.

The flight was the aircraft's fifth that day, having flown from Asmara International Airport, Eritrea, to Cairo; then from Cairo to Tunis–Carthage International Airport, Tunisia, and back; the aircraft then departed for Paris Charles de Gaulle Airport via Cairo, from Tunis.

=== Passengers and crew ===
Passengers on board by citizenship
Citizenship	No.
Algeria	1
Belgium	1
Canada (Note: Two passengers had dual Egyptian–Canadian citizenship, one of them was travelling on their Egyptian passport.)	1
Chad	1
Egypt	30
France	15
Iraq	2
Kuwait	1
Portugal	1
Saudi Arabia	1
Sudan	1
United Kingdom (Note: The passenger had dual British–Australian citizenship.)	1
Crew	10
Some passengers had multiple citizenship. Counts are based on preliminary data.

Fifty-six passengers from twelve different countries were on board. Three passengers were reported to be children, including two infants. Some of the passengers held multiple citizenship.

The crew of ten consisted of two pilots, five flight attendants, and three security personnel. The captain, 36-year-old Mohamed Shoukair, had 6,640 hours of flying experience, including 2,108 hours on the A320. The first officer, 25-year-old Mohamed Assem, had 2,966 total flying hours, including 2,771 hours on the A320.

== Flight ==
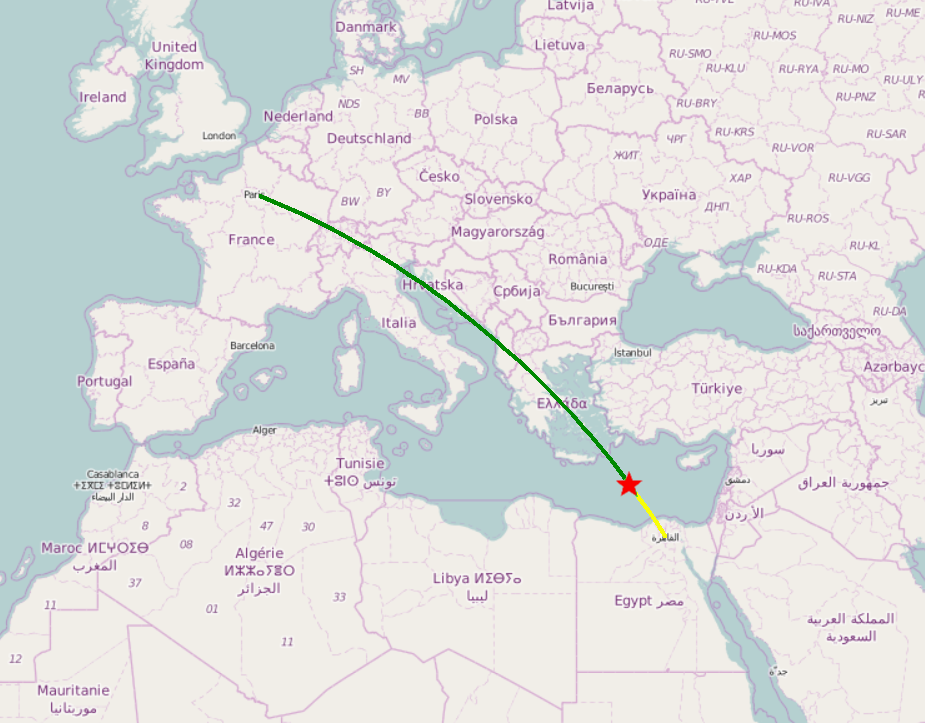
Flight route in green. Red star: lost ADS-B signal. Yellow line: remaining flightpath.

Flight speed (orange) and altitude (blue) from 20:30 to 00:30.

The aircraft departed for Cairo International Airport from Charles de Gaulle Airport on 18 May 2016 at 23:09 (all times refer to UTC+2, used in France and Egypt at the time). It disappeared from radar while flying at flight level 370 (about 37,000 ft (11,300 m) in altitude) in clear weather, 280 km (170 mi; 150 nmi) north of the Egyptian coast, and about the same distance from Kastellorizo, over the eastern Mediterranean on 19 May at 02:30. The aircraft crashed into the sea at around 02:33, when the last ACARS message was sent. The flight had lasted 3 hours 25 minutes.

The aircraft was due to land at 03:05. It was originally reported that a distress signal from emergency devices was detected by the Egyptian military at 04:26, two hours after the last radar contact; officials later retracted this statement.

On the day of the crash, Panos Kammenos, the Greek defence minister, noted the aircraft changed heading 90 degrees to the left, then turned 360 degrees to the right while it dropped from Flight Level 370 to 15,000 feet (4,600 m). This information was initially rejected on 23 May by an Egyptian official from the National Air Navigation Services Company, who stated that there was no change in altitude and no unusual movement before the aircraft disappeared from radar. It is possible that Egyptian radars were unable to track the aircraft as accurately as Greek radars due to their distance from the aircraft. On 14 June, Egyptian authorities confirmed the statements made by Greek officials. According to air-safety experts and veteran crash investigators, the initial left turn could have exceeded computer-controlled flight protections, and might also have come close to or exceeded the structural design limits of the aircraft.

== Search and recovery efforts ==
=== Initial efforts ===
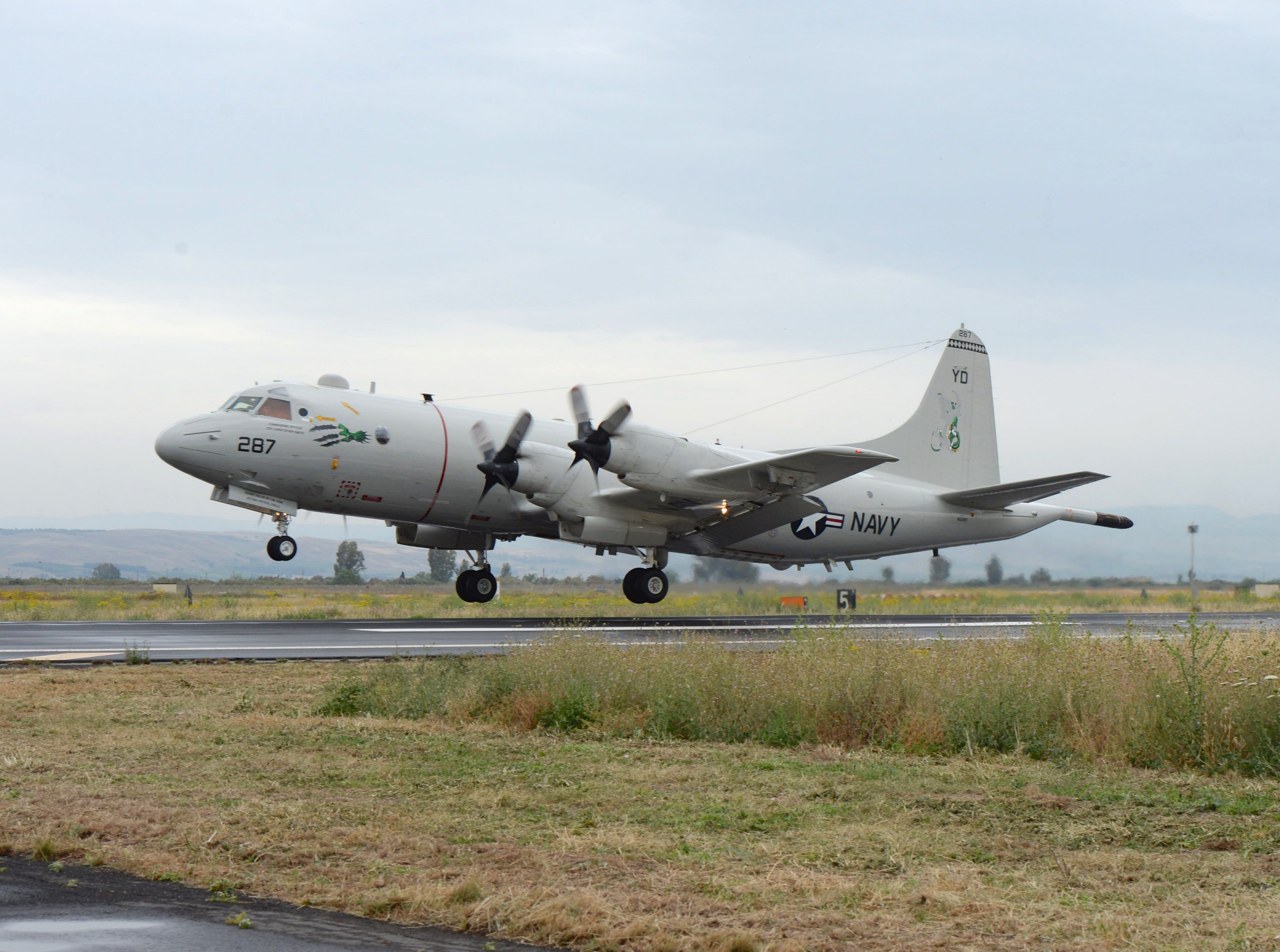
A U.S. Navy P-3C Orion takes off from Naval Air Station Sigonella in Sicily on 19 May to search for Flight 804

The Egyptian Civil Aviation Ministry confirmed that search and rescue teams were deployed to look for the missing aircraft. Search efforts were carried out in coordination with Greek authorities. A spokesman for the Egyptian Civil Aviation Agency stated that the aircraft most likely crashed into the sea. Greece and France sent aircraft and naval ships to the area to participate in search and rescue efforts. The United Kingdom sent a naval ship, while the United States sent a naval aircraft.

=== Search area ===
On 20 May, units of the Egyptian Navy and Air Force discovered debris, body parts, passengers' belongings, luggage, and aircraft seats at the crash site, 290 km (180 mi; 160 nmi) off the coast of Alexandria, Egypt. Two fields of debris were spotted from the air between 20 May at dusk and 23 May at dawn; one of them was 3 nmi (3.5 mi; 5.6 km) in radius. At this time, the searched area measured nearly 14,000 km^{2} (5,400 sq mi), with the sea being 2,440 to 3,050 metres (8,000 to 10,000 ft) deep there.

External image
- Slick detected by the ESA near site of disappearance

The European Space Agency (ESA) announced on 20 May that it had possibly detected a 2-kilometre-long (1.2 mi) fuel slick at 33°32′N 29°13′E, about 40 kilometres (25 mi) southeast of the last known location of Flight 804, on imagery captured by its Sentinel-1A satellite at 16:00 UTC on 19 May.

On 26 May, it was reported that signals from the aircraft's emergency locator transmitter had been detected by satellite, which narrowed the area where the main wreckage was likely to be located on the seabed to within a radius of 5 kilometres (3 mi). An emergency locator transmitter usually activates at impact to send a radio distress signal; this is not the signal from an underwater locator beacon (ULB) attached to a flight recorder, which is an ultrasonic pulse. The U.S. National Oceanic and Atmospheric Administration confirmed that the emergency locator transmitter signal was received by satellites minutes after the airliner disappeared from radar. A "distress signal" received two hours after the disappearance of the aircraft, possibly originating from the emergency locator transmitter, had been reported already on 19 May; this report was denied by EgyptAir.

At the beginning of June, after ultrasonic pulses from a ULB of one of the flight recorders had been detected, a "priority search area" 2 kilometres (1 mi) in radius was established.

The John Lethbridge, a vessel belonging to Deep Ocean Search, equipped with a remotely operated underwater vehicle that can detect signals in depths of up to 6,000 metres (20,000 ft), and map the seabed, was contracted by Egyptian authorities. Capable of retrieving the flight recorders from the seabed, it left the Irish Sea on 28 May and, at that time, it was expected to arrive at the search area around 9 June, after stopping in the Egyptian Port of Alexandria to board Egyptian and French investigators. The vessel was delayed, arriving in Alexandria on 9 June and at the search area some time on or before 13 June. On 15 June, Egyptian authorities announced that searchers on board the John Lethbridge had identified several main sections of wreckage on the seabed. On 9 July, the Egyptian government reported it was extending the John Lethbridge's stay at the crash site, to 18 July. The John Lethbridge concluded its mission to recover human remains and returned to the port of Alexandria on 16 July. On arrival, the recovered remains were transferred from the John Lethbridge to Egypt's Department of Forensic Medicine in Cairo for DNA analysis and processing.

=== Flight recorders ===
On 22 May, an Egyptian remotely operated underwater vehicle (ROV), owned by the country's Oil Ministry, was deployed to join the search for the missing aircraft. President Abdel Fattah el-Sisi stated that the ROV can operate at a depth of 3,000 metres (9,840 ft). According to Egypt's chief investigator with the Civil Aviation Ministry, Ayman al-Moqadem, the ROV cannot detect signals from flight recorders.

A French Navy D'Estienne d'Orves-class aviso ship, the Enseigne de vaisseau Jacoubet, equipped with sonar able to detect the underwater "pings" emitted by the ULBs of the flight recorders, arrived at the possible crash site on 23 May. The French ship can deploy an ROV that can dive up to 1,000 metres (3,300 ft) and that is able to detect signals from ULBs but with limited depth range.

On 26 May, Italian and French companies capable of executing deep-sea searches, including ALSEAMAR and the Mauritius-based Deep Ocean Search, were asked by Egypt to help locate the flight recorders.

A more specialized French Navy ship, the oceanographic research ship Laplace, left the Corsican port of Porto-Vecchio for the search area on 27 May, according to French aircraft accident investigation body the Bureau of Enquiry and Analysis for Civil Aviation Safety (BEA). The vessel can deploy three towed Alseamar hydrophone arrays that are designed to detect a ULB from a distance of up to nearly 4 kilometres (2 mi). On 1 June, the Egyptian Civil Aviation Ministry reported that "pings" from a ULB of one of the flight recorders had been detected by the Laplace. This was confirmed by the BEA whose spokesperson announced the establishment of a "priority search area".

The survey ship John Lethbridge was at the search area by 13 June. The ULBs, which were activated on 19 May, are designed to last for at least 30 days; the Egyptian board of inquiry said the signals would continue until 24 June. On 16 June, Egyptian authorities announced that the searchers on the John Lethbridge had found the cockpit voice recorder (CVR), damaged, at a depth of 13,000 feet (4,000 m). The memory unit was retrieved intact and sent to Cairo for investigation, following the transfer of the CVR to Egyptian civil aviation officials in Alexandria. The next day it was announced that the John Lethbridge had been used to retrieve, in several pieces, the second flight recorder—the flight data recorder (FDR). The memory unit was recovered from the damaged flight data recorder but an Egyptian official stated that the flight recorders require extensive repair before they could be properly analyzed and accessed.

On 19 June, Egypt's Aircraft Accident Investigation Committee announced that they, with the assistance of the Egyptian Armed Forces, had completed the drying procedure of the intact memory modules and started electrical testing of the memory modules from both the cockpit voice recorder and the flight data recorder.

On 21 June, officials involved in the investigation disclosed that the memory chips from both recorders were damaged. After the initial attempts to download data from both recorders failed, the Egyptian investigative committee announced on 23 June that both recorders would be sent to France's BEA to have salt deposits from the memory chips removed; the recorders would then be returned to Egypt for analysis.

On 27 June, the BEA announced that the FDR had been repaired and sent back to Cairo for data analysis by civil aviation safety authorities.

== Early responses ==
Initially, the disappearance and crash of Flight 804 was assumed to be linked to terrorism and insurgency in the region. For instance, the Egyptian Civil Aviation Ministry stated on 19 May that Flight 804 was probably attacked. Two US officials believed the aircraft was downed by a bomb, and a senior official said that monitoring equipment focused on the area at the time detected evidence of an explosion on board the aircraft; other officials from multiple US agencies said they had seen no evidence of an explosion in satellite imagery and another two intelligence officials stated there is nothing yet to indicate foul play.

== Investigation ==
According to Greek military radar data, Flight 804 veered off course shortly after entering the Egyptian flight information region. At Flight Level 370 (about 37,000 ft (11,300 m) in altitude), the aircraft made a 90-degree left turn, followed by a 360-degree right turn, and then began to descend sharply. Radar contact was lost at an altitude of about 10,000 ft (3,000 m). This information was later denied on 23 May by an Egyptian official from the National Air Navigation Services Company, who stated there was no change in altitude and no unusual movement before the aircraft disappeared from radar. On 14 June, Egyptian authorities confirmed the statements made by Greek officials.

On 19 May, Greece's Ministry of National Defence reported that it was investigating the report of a merchant ship captain who claimed to have seen a "fire in the sky" 240 km (150 mi; 130 nmi) south of the island of Karpathos.

Shortly after the disappearance, the French government began to investigate whether there had been a security breach at Paris Charles de Gaulle Airport.

ACARS messages

- 00:26Z 3044 ANTI ICE R WINDOW
- 00:26Z 561200 R SLIDING WINDOW SENSOR
- 00:26Z 2600 SMOKE LAVATORY SMOKE
- 00:27Z 2600 AVIONICS SMOKE
- 00:28Z 561100 R FIXED WINDOW SENSOR
- 00:29Z 2200 AUTO FLT FCU 2 FAULT
- 00:29Z 2700 F/CTL SEC 3 FAULT
All times are UTC (also known as Zulu time).

Seven messages sent via the ACARS had been received from the aircraft between 02:26 and 02:29 local time; contact was lost four minutes later at 02:33. The data, confirmed by France's Bureau of Enquiry and Analysis (BEA), indicates that smoke may have been detected in the front of the airliner—in the front lavatory and the avionics bay beneath the cockpit. Smoke detectors of the type installed on the aircraft can also be triggered by the condensation of water vapour, producing fog, in the event of a sudden loss of pressure inside the cabin. The aircraft's optical smoke detectors have been deemed more reliable than older models on Airbus aircraft, as they produced fewer false warnings, but were sensitive to dust and some aerosols. The three windows mentioned in the data are cockpit windows, on the co-pilot's side. The flight control unit (FCU) is a cockpit-fitted unit that the pilot uses to enter instructions into the two flight management guidance computers (FMGC); an FCU 2 fault indicates a loss of connection between the FCU and FMGC number 2. The spoiler elevator computer number 3 (SEC 3) is one of the three computers that controls the spoilers and elevator actuators. Two pilots—one interviewed by The Daily Telegraph, the other writing for The Australian—interpreted the data as possible evidence of a bomb.

At 02:36, seven minutes after the last ACARS message and the last ADS-B transmission, two transmissions from the aircraft's Emergency Locator Transmitter (ELT) were received by the international Cospas-Sarsat system. These transmissions indicated that they were initiated in "test" mode, suggesting either an unusual manipulation of the cockpit ELT switch, or an electrical fault in the switch's circuit. The transmissions were received by Cospas-Sarsat's then-experimental MEOSAR system, and subsequent data collection and analyses by the Cospas-Sarsat Secretariat and engineers at France's Centre national d'études spatiales (CNES) were successfully used to calculate the likely point of impact of the flight in the Mediterranean Sea.

Aviation expert David Learmount of Flight International suggested that an electrical fire could have started in the aircraft's avionics compartment and that the aircrew may have been too distracted to communicate their distress to air traffic control.

On 22 May, the French television station M6 reported that, contrary to official statements, one of the pilots told Cairo air traffic control about smoke in the cabin, and decided to make an emergency descent. Later that day, the report was dismissed as false by the Egyptian Civil Aviation Ministry.

On 24 May, a forensics official from Egypt's investigative team said that the remains of the victims indicated an explosion on board. The head of forensics denied the claim.

At the beginning of June, France 3 and Le Parisien reported that the aircraft had performed three emergency landings in the hours before the crash—at Asmara, Tunis, and Cairo—followed by technical inspections, after ACARS messages "signalled anomalies on board shortly after takeoff from three airports". On 2 June, Safwat Musallam, EgyptAir's chairman, denied the report.

With investigations into the crash ongoing, Egyptian officials announced on 29 June that data recovered from the flight data recorder, as well as recovered wreckage from the plane, indicated that smoke had occurred on the aircraft, which matched previous information relayed by the plane's ACARS. Egyptian Civil Aviation Ministry experts have suggested that wreckage from the front section indicates high temperature combustion. Also, the data showed that the flight data recorder recorded the smoke and fault alarms at the same moment that the aircraft's ACARS relayed messages about them to the ground station, and that the data recorder stopped recording at an altitude of 37,000 ft (11,300 m) above sea level. Media reported that data from the cockpit voice recorder indicated one of the pilots had tried to extinguish the fire in the cockpit before the airplane crashed. After these reports were released, the Egyptian Civil Aviation Authority urged "media to be cautious while issuing press releases about the accident and to only rely on official reports issued by the committee itself." On 16 July the committee confirmed that the cockpit voice recording mentioned "the existence of a fire".

On 22 July, investigators privately suggested that the aircraft might have broken up in mid-air.

In August 2016, French foreign minister Jean-Marc Ayrault criticized the fact that no further explanation for the reasons behind the crash had been given. In December 2016, Egyptian officials said traces of explosives were found on the bodies, hinting to a possible terrorism attack. In May 2017, the BEA led by France conducted their own investigation, ultimately dismissing the explosives claim as they were unable to find any explosive residue, and no terrorist organization claimed responsibility for the crash.

On 17 September 2016, Reuters relayed a 16 September report from the French news outlet Le Figaro that French forensic investigators visiting Cairo noted traces of the explosive TNT on the aircraft debris. According to Le Figaro's source, Egypt proposed a joint report with France announcing the discovery of evidence of an explosive, but France declined, alleging that Egyptian judicial authorities did not allow the French investigators "to carry out an adequate inspection to determine how the traces could have got there".

A manslaughter investigation was started in France in June 2016; in April 2019, a report commissioned as part of the investigation stated the aircraft was not airworthy and should have never taken off: recurring defects had not been reported by the crews, including alerts reporting potential fire hazards.

On 15 December 2016 Egyptian investigators announced that traces of explosives had been found on the victims; a source close to the French investigation expressed doubts about these findings. On 13 January 2017, French newspaper Le Parisien published an article claiming that unspecified "French authorities" believed the aircraft might have been brought down by a cockpit fire caused by an overheating phone battery; it noted parallels between the position where the co-pilot had stowed his iPad and iPhone 6S and data that suggested an accidental fire on the right-hand side of the flight deck, next to the co-pilot.

On 7 May 2017, French officials stated that no traces of explosives had been found on the bodies of the victims.

On 6 July 2018, France's BEA stated that the most likely hypothesis was a fire in the cockpit that spread rapidly.

In April 2022, French investigators stated, in a report submitted to the Court of Appeal of Paris and obtained by Corriere della Sera, that the fire was caused by a cigarette in the cockpit which burned out of control when exposed to oxygen emitted from an oxygen mask, which was improperly set to an emergency setting; smoking in the cockpit was not prohibited at that time and Egyptian pilots habitually smoked in the cockpit. A study conducted by the BEA found that "no evidence from the CVR confirms or refutes the hypothesis that people were smoking in the cockpit" and that "tests carried out do not suggest that a lit cigarette contributed to the accident sequence".

On 30 October 2024, Egypt's Civil Aviation Authority concluded in its final report that the crash was the result of an explosion in the galley area behind the cockpit. The subsequent fire rapidly propagated resulting in multiple systems failure, exacerbated by oxygen flowing inside the cockpit, as a result of the explosion, which enriched the fire and the smoke. This theory was rejected by the BEA, which concluded the fire was most likely a result of a fault in the oxygen mask. Concluding on a "[s]cenario based on presence of explosives", the BEA stated that:

The possible discovery of traces of explosives on the aeroplane's occupants, even in several places, does not in itself make it possible to conclude that there was an explosion on board, when all the other physical evidence is incompatible with the scenario of an explosion that damaged the plane's structure or systems to the point of rendering it uncontrollable.

== French manslaughter investigation ==
In June 2016, Paris prosecutor's office indicated that a preliminary investigation into the accident would begin, since no evidence of any act of terrorism had been found; the office had opened a manslaughter investigation instead.

In April 2019, a report commissioned as part of the French investigation and seen by Le Parisien stated the aircraft was not airworthy. On at least four previous flights recurring defects were not reported by the crews and the aircraft was not checked according to procedure. Some twenty alerts (visual and audible) had been made by the ECAM system the day before the flight, including alerts reporting an electrical problem that could lead to a fire. Pilots instead reset circuit breakers and cleared the messages, in violation of the appropriate procedures instructed by Airbus. More alerts had been noted as far back as 1 May 2016, occurring over dozens of flights operated by the aircraft, but were ignored by the airline.

The premises of BEA had to be searched under warrant as part of the investigation to obtain these data, and that occurred in October 2018. The BEA claimed that under international aviation law they were not responsible for supplying information to French judicial investigators. While they at first denied having data-recorder data, they later explained that automatic back-ups had retained the data after the original files had been deleted.

Crews on the flights preceding the crash told the investigators that they had not encountered any problems during their respective flights. EgyptAir's CEO Ahmed Adel also rejected the French report, citing it as "misleading."

Confidential documents released in December 2019 by The Wall Street Journal stated that an oxygen leak may have been responsible for the fire, and indicated that a sound similar to a high-pressure leak was heard on the CVR before the captain declared a fire, while passengers were moving to the back of the plane.

== In popular culture ==
The crash of EgyptAir Flight 804 was featured in the 2023 episode "Mystery over the Mediterranean", of the Canadian-made, internationally distributed documentary series Mayday.

== See also ==
- List of accidents and incidents involving the Airbus A320 family
- Swissair Flight 111
- Air Canada Flight 797
- Aviastar-TU Flight 6534
