= French aviso Commandant Ducuing =

D'Estienne d'Orves-class aviso of the French Navy

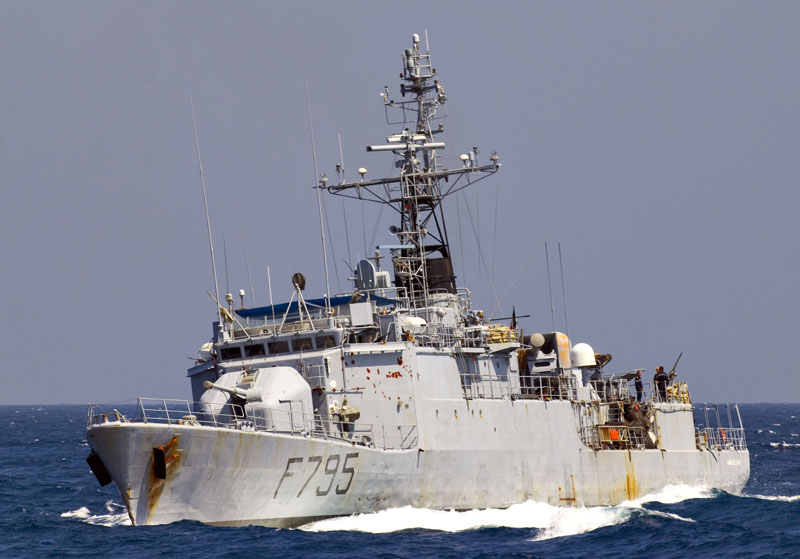
- Commandant Ducuing

History

France
- Name: Commandant Ducuing
- Namesake: Gabriel Ducuing
- Builder: Arsenal de Lorient, Lorient
- Laid down: 1 October 1980
- Launched: 26 September 1981
- Commissioned: 17 March 1983
- Out of service: June 2025
- Home port: Toulon
- Identification: Callsign: FADC; Pennant number: F795
- Status: Decommissioned

General characteristics
- Class & type: D'Estienne d'Orves-class aviso
- Displacement: 1,100 t (1,100 long tons) standard; 1,270 t (1,250 long tons) full load
- Length: 80 m (262 ft 6 in) oa; 76 m (249 ft 4 in) pp
- Beam: 10.3 m (33 ft 10 in)
- Draught: 5.3 m (17 ft 5 in)
- Propulsion: 2 SEMT Pielstick 12 PC 2 V400 diesel engines; 8,900 kW (12,000 bhp), 2 shafts
- Speed: 23.5 knots (43.5 km/h; 27.0 mph)
- Range: 4,500 nmi (8,300 km; 5,200 mi) at 15 knots (28 km/h; 17 mph)
- Complement: 90
- Sensors & processing systems: 1 Air/surface DRBV 51A sentry radar; 1 DRBC 32E fire control radar; 1 Decca 1226 navigation radar; 1 DUBA 25 hull sonar (active sonar capability reportedly retained after conversion to OPV role)
- Electronic warfare & decoys: 1 ARBR 16 radar interceptor; 2 Dagaie decoy launchers; 1 SLQ-25 Nixie countermeasure system
- Armament: 2 Exocet MM38 SSMs (removed from French ships when reclassified as OPVs); 1 × 100 mm CADAM gun turret with Najir fire control system and CMS LYNCEA; 2 × 20 mm modèle F2 guns; 4 × 12.7 mm machine guns; 4 × L3 or L5 type torpedoes in four fixed catapults (removed from French ships when reclassified as OPVs); 1 × sextuple Bofors 375 mm rocket launcher (removed from French ships when reclassified as OPVs)

Commandant Ducuing (F795) was a D'Estienne d'Orves-class aviso in the French Navy. The vessel was home ported at Toulon.

== Design ==
Crewed by 90 sailors, these vessels have the reputation of being among the most difficult in bad weather. Their high windage makes them particularly sensitive to pitch and roll as soon as the sea is formed.

Their armament, consequent for a vessel of this tonnage, allows them to manage a large spectrum of missions. During the Cold War, they were primarily used to patrol the continental shelf of the Atlantic Ocean in search of Soviet Navy submarines. Due to the poor performance of the hull sonar, as soon as an echo appeared, the reinforcement of an anti-submarine warfare frigate was necessary to chase it using its towed variable depth sonar.

Their role as patrollers now consists mainly of patrol and assistance missions, as well as participation in UN missions (blockades, flag checks) or similar marine policing tasks (fight against drugs, extraction of nationals, fisheries control, etc.). Their anti-ship missiles have been landed, but they carry several machine guns more suited to their current missions.

The vessel's construction cost was estimated at 270,000,000 French francs.

== Construction and career ==
Commandant Ducuing was laid down on 1 October 1980 at Arsenal de Lorient, Lorient. Launched on 26 September 1981 and commissioned on 17 March 1983.

She took part in Opération Artimon in 1990. In April 2009 the aviso took part in Operation Tanit, an operation to free a French yacht that was hijacked by Somali pirates. The aviso, sailing from Jeddah, Saudi Arabia, made a stopover on 8 and 9 June 2010 at the Iraqi port of Umm Qasr, which was a first for a French ship for 32 years.

In June 2015, the ship was responsible for monitoring bluefin tuna fishing off Malta.

In 2022, it was indicated that the ship would be equipped with the SMDM (navy mini-drone system) to enhance her surveillance capabilities. In 2022–23, the ship deployed to the Gulf of Guinea for two months to assist local navies in countering, principally Chinese, illegal overfishing.

In May 2025, Commandant Ducuing participated in her final international exercises, "Obangame Express 25" off the coasts of Senegal and Gambia. She then departed for the Mediterranean to prepare for her decommissioning from service. She was formally decommissioned in December 2025. It is planned that she will eventually be replaced by the Patrouilleurs Hauturiers vessels due to enter service from 2027.
