= French aviso Commandant Bouan =

D'Estienne d'Orves-class aviso of the French Navy

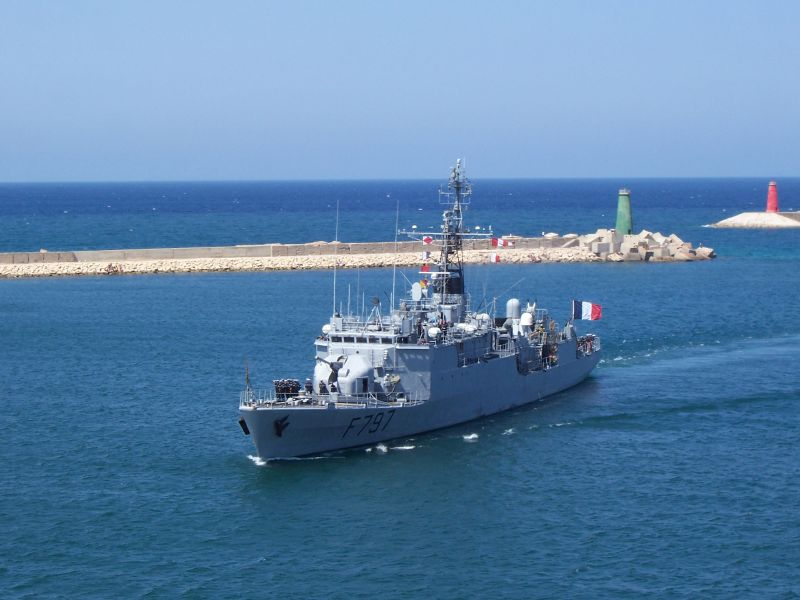
- Commandant Bouan

History

France
- Name: Commandant Bouan
- Namesake: Jean Adolphe Roger Bouan
- Builder: Arsenal de Lorient, Lorient
- Laid down: 12 October 1981
- Launched: 23 May 1983
- Commissioned: 11 May 1984
- Decommissioned: 4 November 2026
- Home port: Toulon
- Identification: Callsign: FABO; Pennant number: F797
- Status: Decommissioned

General characteristics
- Class & type: D'Estienne d'Orves-class aviso
- Displacement: 1,100 t (1,100 long tons) standard; 1,270 t (1,250 long tons) full load
- Length: 80 m (262 ft 6 in) oa; 76 m (249 ft 4 in) pp
- Beam: 10.3 m (33 ft 10 in)
- Draught: 5.3 m (17 ft 5 in)
- Propulsion: 2 SEMT Pielstick 12 PC 2 V400 diesel engines; 8,900 kW (12,000 bhp), 2 shafts
- Speed: 23.5 knots (43.5 km/h; 27.0 mph)
- Range: 4,500 nmi (8,300 km; 5,200 mi) at 15 knots (28 km/h; 17 mph)
- Complement: 90
- Sensors & processing systems: 1 Air/surface DRBV 51A sentry radar; 1 DRBC 32E fire control radar; 1 Decca 1226 navigation radar; 1 DUBA 25 hull sonar (active sonar capability reportedly retained after conversion to OPV role)
- Electronic warfare & decoys: 1 ARBR 16 radar interceptor; 2 Dagaie decoy launchers; 1 SLQ-25 Nixie countermeasure system
- Armament: 2 Exocet MM38 SSMs (removed from French ships when reclassified as OPVs); 1 × 100 mm CADAM gun turret with Najir fire control system and CMS LYNCEA; 2 × 20 mm modèle F2 guns; 4 × 12.7 mm machine guns; 4 × L3 or L5 type torpedoes in four fixed catapults (removed from French ships when reclassified as OPVs); 1 × sextuple Bofors 375 mm rocket launcher (removed from French ships when reclassified as OPVs)

Commandant Bouan (F797) was a D'Estienne d'Orves-class aviso in the French Navy. The ship was homeported in Toulon. She was decommissioned in 2026 after 42 years service.

== Design ==
Crewed by 90 sailors, these vessels have the reputation of being among the most difficult in bad weather. Their high windage makes them particularly sensitive to pitch and roll as soon as the sea is formed.

Their armament, consequent for a vessel of this tonnage, allows them to manage a large spectrum of missions. During the Cold War, they were primarily used to patrol the continental shelf of the Atlantic Ocean in search of Soviet Navy submarines. Due to the poor performance of the hull sonar, as soon as an echo appeared, the reinforcement of an anti-submarine warfare frigate was necessary to chase it using its towed variable depth sonar.

Their role as patrollers now consists mainly of patrols and assistance missions, as well as participation in UN missions (blockades, flag checks) or similar marine policing tasks (fight against drugs, extraction of nationals, fisheries control, etc.). The anti-ship missiles have been landed, but they carry several machine guns and machine guns, more suited to their new missions.

Its construction cost was estimated at 270,000,000 French francs.

== Construction and career ==
Commandant Bouan was laid down on 12 October 1981 at Arsenal de Lorient, Lorient. Launched on 23 May 1983 and commissioned on 11 May 1984.

On 15 July 2008, at 9:12 a.m., while she was preparing to leave the port of Nice (Alpes-Maritimes) where he had spent three days on the occasion of the 14 July ceremonies, the ship collided with the quay at the level of its bow during its departure maneuver, a port pilot being on board and a tug hitched up. The damage consisted mainly of a sinking of the bow above the waterline, which was the subject of a makeshift repair by DCNS personnel, dispatched to the site. It delayed by 24 hours before reaching Toulon, its homport, where final repairs were carried out during the unavailability for maintenance, already scheduled for this ship in September and October 2008.

In June 2021, Commandant Bouan participated in anti-piracy missions in the Gulf of Guinea off Nigeria.

In May 2022, the ship evaluated the SMDM (navy mini-drone system) over a four week period. It was subsequently indicated that she would be permanently equipped with the system in order to enhance her surveillance capabilities.

From May to September 2023, the ship underwent her last refit prior to her planned retirement and permitting her to remain in service until 2026. She was withdrawn from service in 2026 and formally decommissioned in November. She is eventually to be replaced by one of a new class of ocean-going Patrol Vessels (the Patrouilleurs Hauturiers).
