= French aviso Lieutenant de vaisseau Le Hénaff =

D'Estienne d'Orves-class aviso of the French Navy

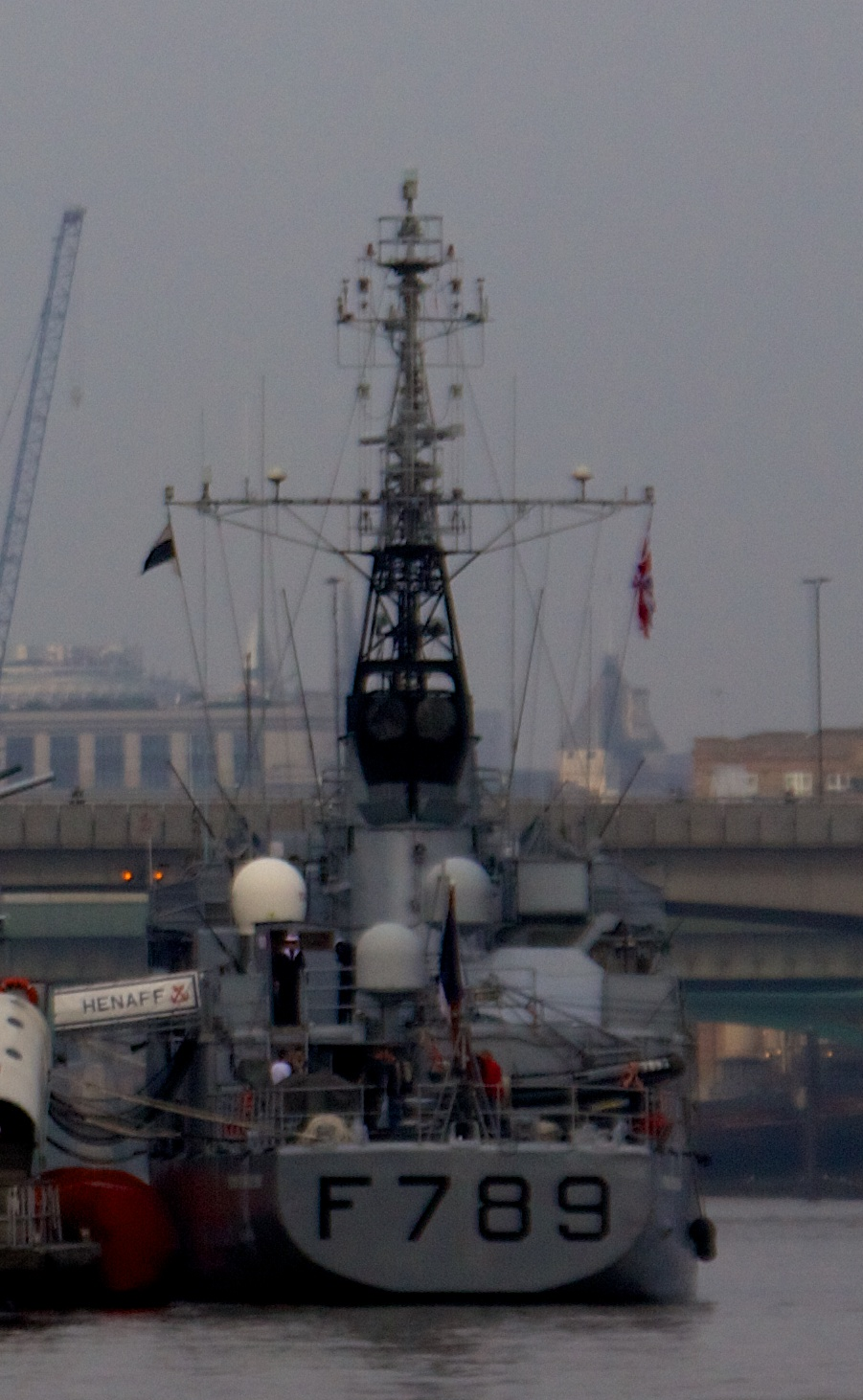
- Lieutenant de vaisseau Le Hénaff

History

France
- Name: Lieutenant de vaisseau Le Hénaff
- Namesake: Yves Le Hénaff
- Builder: Arsenal de Lorient, Lorient
- Laid down: March 1977
- Launched: 16 September 1978
- Commissioned: 13 February 1980
- Decommissioned: 31 July 2020
- Identification: Callsign: FALF; Pennant number: F789
- Status: Decommissioned

General characteristics
- Class & type: D'Estienne d'Orves-class aviso
- Displacement: 1,100 t (1,100 long tons) standard; 1,270 t (1,250 long tons) full load
- Length: 80 m (262 ft 6 in) oa; 76 m (249 ft 4 in) pp
- Beam: 10.3 m (33 ft 10 in)
- Draught: 5.3 m (17 ft 5 in)
- Propulsion: 2 SEMT Pielstick 12 PC 2 V400 diesel engines; 8,900 kW (12,000 bhp), 2 shafts
- Speed: 23.5 knots (43.5 km/h; 27.0 mph)
- Range: 4,500 nmi (8,300 km; 5,200 mi) at 15 knots (28 km/h; 17 mph)
- Complement: 90
- Sensors & processing systems: 1 Air/surface DRBV 51A sentry radar; 1 DRBC 32E fire control radar; 1 Decca 1226 navigation radar; 1 DUBA 25 hull sonar (active sonar capability reportedly retained after conversion to OPV role)
- Electronic warfare & decoys: 1 ARBR 16 radar interceptor; 2 Dagaie decoy launchers; 1 SLQ-25 Nixie countermeasure system
- Armament: 2 Exocet MM38 SSMs (removed from French ships when reclassified as OPVs); 1 × 100 mm CADAM gun turret with Najir fire control system and CMS LYNCEA; 2 × 20 mm modèle F2 guns; 4 × 12.7 mm machine guns; 4 × L3 or L5 type torpedoes in four fixed catapults (removed from French ships when reclassified as OPVs); 1 × sextuple Bofors 375 mm rocket launcher (removed from French ships when reclassified as OPVs)

Lieutenant de vaisseau Le Hénaff (F789) was a D'Estienne d'Orves-class aviso in the French Navy.

== Design ==
Armed by a crew of 90 sailors, these vessels have the reputation of being among the most difficult in bad weather. Their high windage makes them particularly sensitive to pitch and roll as soon as the sea is formed.

Their armament, consequent for a vessel of this tonnage, allows them to manage a large spectrum of missions. During the Cold War, they were primarily used to patrol the continental shelf of the Atlantic Ocean in search of Soviet Navy submarines. Due to the poor performance of the hull sonar, as soon as an echo appeared, the reinforcement of an ASM frigate was necessary to chase it using its towed variable depth sonar.

Their role as patrollers now consists mainly of patrols and assistance missions, as well as participation in UN missions (blockades, flag checks) or similar marine policing tasks (fight against drugs, extraction of nationals, fisheries control, etc.). The mer-mer 38 or mer-mer 40 missiles have been landed, but they carry several machine guns and machine guns, more suited to their new missions.

Its construction cost was estimated at 270,000,000 French francs.

== Construction and career ==
Lieutenant de vaisseau Le Hénaff was laid down in March 1977 at Arsenal de Lorient, Lorient. Launched on 16 September 1978 and commissioned on 13 February 1980.

On 5 March 2019, the ship left Brest with her 100 crew members for the Gulf of Guinea. There she will relieve the amphibious assault ship Mistral as part of the Corymbe 146 mission.

She was decommissioned on 31 July 2020.
