= Enrico Credendino =

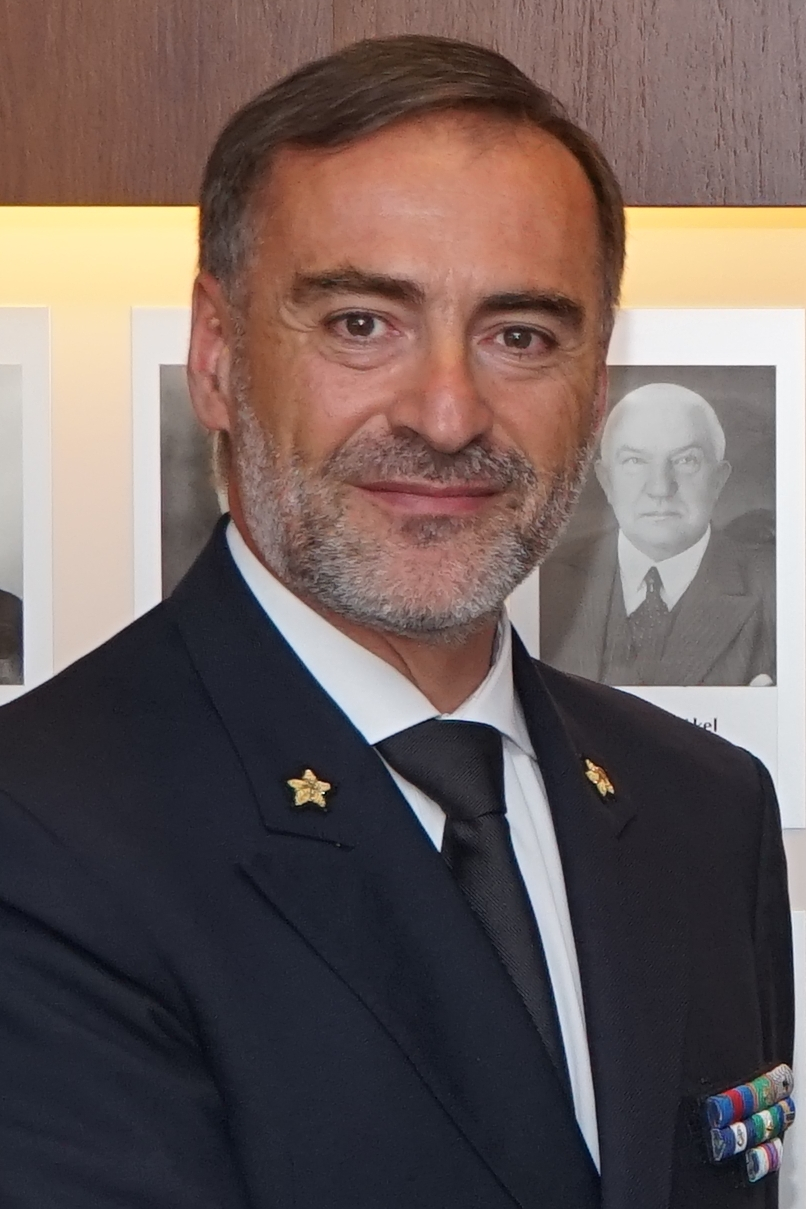
- Born: 21 January 1963 (age 63)
- Military career
- Allegiance: Italy
- Branch: Italian Navy
- Rank: Vice Admiral
- Commands: Chief of the Italian Navy; Commander in Chief Naval Fleet; EU Navfor Med

Enrico Credendino (born 21 January 1963) is an officer of the Italian Navy. He was appointed Chief of the Italian Navy in November 2021.

He joined the Navy in 1980 and attended the Italian Naval Academy.

He commanded the patrol vessel Spica, the Maestrale-class frigate Maestrale and the Durand de la Penne-class missile destroyer Francesco Mimbelli.

Upon promotion to rear admiral (lower half) on 1 July 2011 he was appointed Deputy Commander of front Line Naval Forces and Deputy Commander of Amphibious Force and Commander of the Italian Naval Task Group.

From September 2013 he was Head of Plans and Policy Department at the Italian Navy General Staff. He was promoted to rear admiral on 1 July 2014. On 18 May 2015 he was appointed as Operation Commander for European Union Naval Force Mediterranean. He served as Commander Schools Command from March 2020 to July 2021. He served as Commander in Chief Naval Fleet from July to November 2021.

Military offices
Preceded by Giuseppe Cavo Dragone	Chief of Staff of the Italian Navy; 2021–2025	Succeeded by Giuseppe Berutti Bergotto
Preceded by Paolo Pezzutti	Commander in Chief Naval Fleet; 2021–2021	Incumbent
