= Flamant-class patrol vessel =

French naval ship class

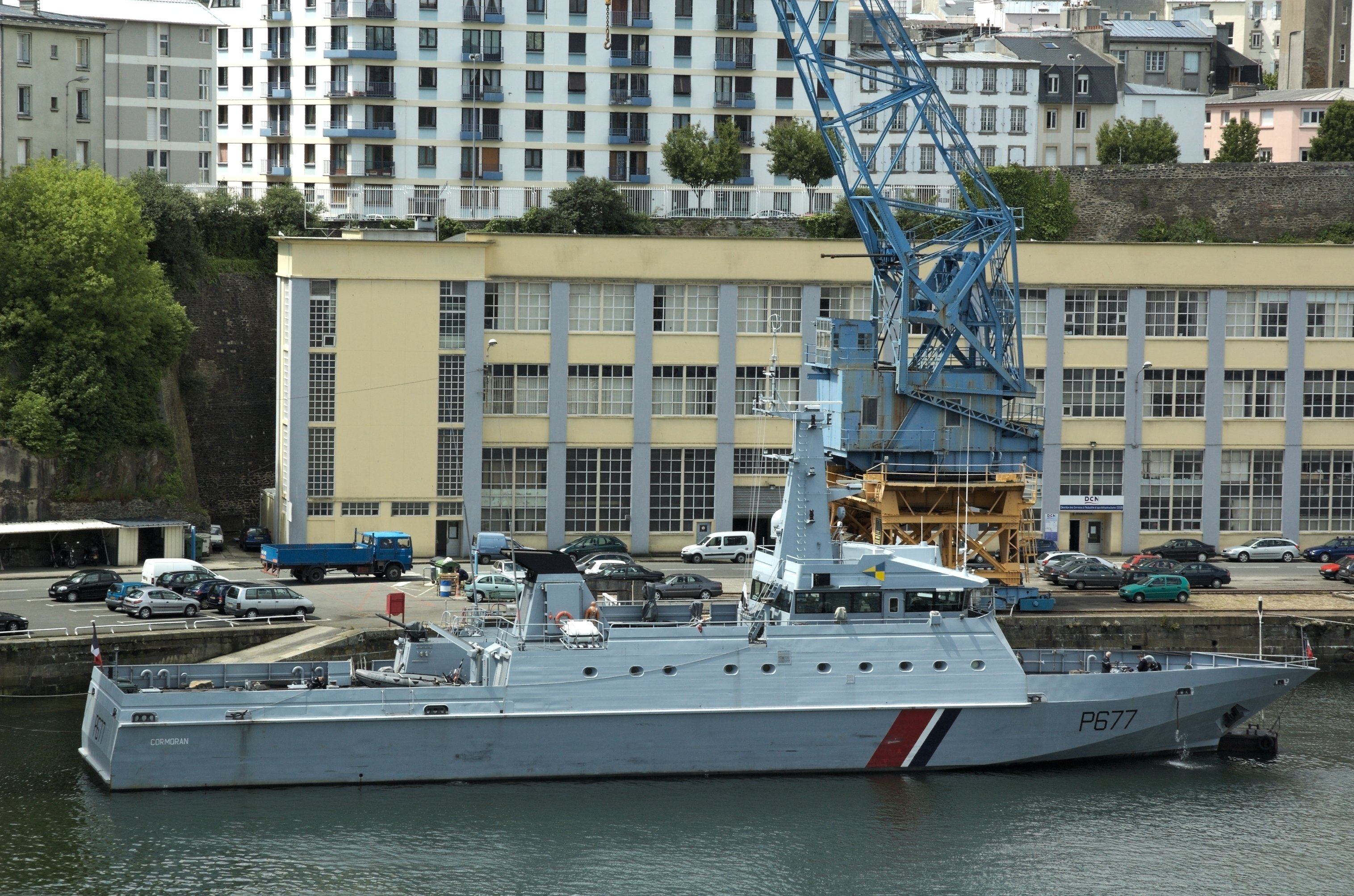
- Cormoran at Brest

Class overview
- Builders: Constructions Mécaniques de Normandie, Cherbourg
- Operators: French Navy
- Succeeded by: Patrouilleurs Hauturiers
- In commission: 1996–present
- Completed: 3
- Active: 3

General characteristics
- Type: Patrol boat
- Displacement: 300 tonnes (295 long tons) standard; 477 tonnes (469 long tons) full load
- Length: 54 m (177 ft 2 in) o/a
- Beam: 10 m (32 ft 10 in)
- Draught: 2.2 m (7 ft 3 in)
- Propulsion: 2 × 3,050 hp (2,274 kW) Deutz-MWM TBD 620 V16 diesel engines; 2 × 930 hp (694 kW) Deutz-MWM TBD234 V12 diesel engines; 2 × variable-pitch propellers
- Speed: 23 knots (43 km/h; 26 mph)
- Range: 4,500 nmi (8,300 km) at 14 kn (26 km/h)
- Boats & landing craft carried: 1 × 6.7 m (22 ft) Zodiac "Hurricane" RHIB
- Complement: 21 (3 officers and 18 men)
- Armament: 2 × 12.7 mm machine guns

The Flamant-class patrol vessel are a series of three Type OPV54 patrol boats of the French Navy used for fishery monitoring, search and rescue, and patrolling France's exclusive economic zone out to 200 nautical miles (370 km; 230 mi).

== Capabilities & Operations ==
The three boats were ordered in August 1993 and entered service in October and December 1997. They are based at Cherbourg.

In addition to their usual facilities the boats are also equipped with two 8 m^{3} (280 ft^{3}) tanks for anti-pollutants, and a water cannon for fire fighting. They have a plant capable of producing 15 tonnes of fresh water per day by reverse osmosis. The boats have an area for vertical replenishment.

Each boat carries a 6.7 m (22 ft) Zodiac "Hurricane" rigid-hulled inflatable boat, powered by a 200 hp (149 kW) water jet engine that gives a top speed of 30 knots (56 km/h; 35 mph).

Replacement of this class had been envisaged after 2027 with a new class of significantly larger patrol vessels (the Patrouilleurs Hauturiers). However, in 2026 it was reported that the ships would be refit and extended in service until at least 2034/35. The refit of the first vessel, Cormoran, began at the Piriou shipyard in October 2026. The two other vessels of the class were expected to follow in 2027.

== Ships ==
- P676 Flamant, laid down March 1994, launched 24 April 1995, entered service 18 December 1997.
- P677 Cormoran, laid down 25 May 1994, launched 15 May 1995, entered service 29 October 1997.
- P678 Pluvier, laid down 1995, launched 1996, entered service 18 December 1997.
