= D'Estienne d'Orves-class aviso =

Class of naval vessel

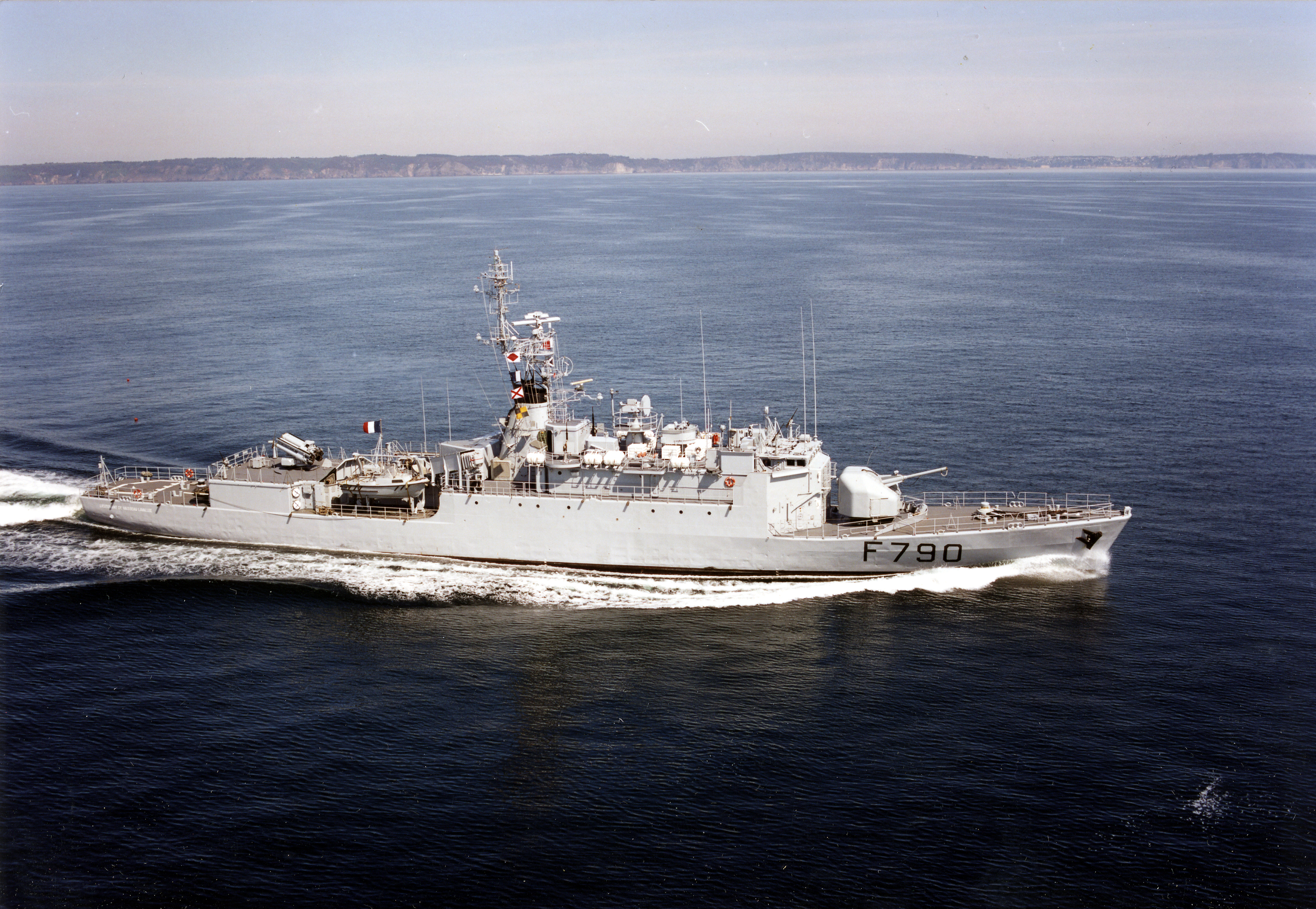
- The aviso Lieutenant de vaisseau Lavallée

Class overview
- Name: D'Estienne d'Orves class or A69 type
- Builders: Arsenal de Lorient
- Operators: French Navy; Turkish Navy; Argentine Navy
- Preceded by: Commandant Rivière class
- Succeeded by: Floréal class; La Fayette class; Patrouilleurs Hauturiers (from 2028)
- Subclasses: Drummond class; Burak class
- In commission: 1976 - now (French Navy); 1999 - now (Turkish Navy); 1978 - 2024 (Argentine Navy)
- Completed: 20
- Active: 5 (4 in Turkish and 1 in French service as of 2026)
- Retired: 15

General characteristics
- Type: Aviso
- Displacement: 1,100 t (1,100 long tons) standard; 1,270 t (1,250 long tons) full load
- Length: 80 m (262 ft 6 in) oa; 76 m (249 ft 4 in) pp
- Beam: 10.3 m (33 ft 10 in)
- Draught: 5.3 m (17 ft 5 in); 3 m (9 ft 10 in)
- Propulsion: 2 SEMT Pielstick 12 PC 2 V400 diesel engines; 8,900 kW (12,000 bhp), 2 shafts
- Speed: 23.5 knots (43.5 km/h; 27.0 mph)
- Range: 4,500 nmi (8,300 km; 5,200 mi) at 15 knots (28 km/h; 17 mph)
- Complement: 90
- Sensors & processing systems: 1 Air/surface DRBV 51A sentry radar; 1 DRBC 32E fire control radar; 1 Decca 1226 navigation radar; 1 DUBA 25 hull sonar (active sonar capability reportedly retained after conversion to OPV role)
- Electronic warfare & decoys: 1 ARBR 16 radar interceptor; 2 Dagaie decoy launchers; 1 SLQ-25 Nixie countermeasure system
- Armament: 2 Exocet MM38 SSMs (removed from French ships when reclassified as OPVs); 1 × 100 mm CADAM gun turret with Najir fire control system and CMS LYNCEA; 2 × 20 mm modèle F2 guns; 4 × 12.7 mm machine guns; 4 × L3 or L5 type torpedoes in four fixed catapults (removed from French ships when reclassified as OPVs); 1 × sextuple Bofors 375 mm rocket launcher (removed from French ships when reclassified as OPVs)

The D'Estienne d'Orves-class avisos, or type A69, is a class of French Navy avisos, comparable in size to a light corvette, mainly designed for coastal anti-submarine defence, but are also available for high sea escort missions, notably in support missions with the Strategic Oceanic Force (FOST). Built on a simple and robust design, they have an economical and reliable propulsion system which allows them to be used for overseas presence missions. In addition to service in France, they have been ordered by the South African Navy (not delivered), Argentinian Navy and Turkish Navy.

The class takes its name from the lead ship, named in honour of Honoré d'Estienne d'Orves, a French naval officer and member of the French Resistance.

== Design and description ==
The D'Estienne d'Orves-class avisos were primarily designed for anti-submarine warfare (ASW) in coastal areas and colonial coastal patrol. They were ordered as replacements for the E 50 and E 52 type escorteurs of the French Navy. The ships are built austerely and have a standard displacement of 1,100 tonnes (1,100 long tons) and 1,270 tonnes (1,250 long tons) at full load. The avisos are 80 metres (262 ft 6 in) long overall and 76 metres (249 ft 4 in) between perpendiculars with a beam of 10.3 metres (33 ft 10 in) and a draught of 5.3 metres (17 ft 5 in).

The avisos are propelled by two shafts turning controllable pitch propellers powered by two SEMT Pielstick 12 PC 2 V400 diesel engines rated at 8,900 kilowatts (12,000 bhp). The two engines are located in a single engine room mounted next to each other and controlled from a room abaft the machinery room. The two diesel engine system was selected due to the preference of endurance over speed. The D'Estienne d'Orves class has a maximum speed of 23.5 knots (43.5 km/h; 27.0 mph) and a range of 4,500 nautical miles (8,300 km; 5,200 mi) at 15 knots (28 km/h; 17 mph). All ships in the class are fitted with fin stabilisers except for Commandant Ducuing and Commandant Birot.

The class was intended to be constructed in two groups, the A 69 and A 70 types, with the latter type fitted with two Exocet MM38 surface-to-surface missiles (SSM) on either side of the funnel, but in the end, all ships of the class were fitted with the SSMs. The ships are armed with a 100 mm (3.9 in) CADAM gun turret with Najir fire control system and CMS LYNCEA, a pair of 20 mm (0.8 in) modèle F2 guns and four 12.7 mm (0.5 in) machine guns. For ASW operations, the D'Estienne d'Orves class mounts four fixed catapults for L3 or L5 type torpedoes with no reloads carried and one remote-controlled sextuple 375 mm (14.8 in) rocket launcher, with 30 reloads carried in a magazine located beneath the aft deckhouse.

The D'Estienne d'Orves class is equipped with one air/surface DRBV 51A sentry radar, one DRBC 32E fire control radar one Decca 1226 navigation radar and DUBA 25 hull-mounted sonar. The DUBA 25 is situated in a fixed dome with a retractable transducer, but is designed strictly for use in coastal waters. As countermeasures the avisos have one ARBR 16 radar interceptor, two Dagaie decoy launchers and one SLQ-25 Nixie countermeasure system, which was fitted in the mid-1980s. The ships have a complement of 90 and have space to accommodate 18 marines.

=== Modifications ===
Beyond the Nixie countermeasure system, the funnels aboard the avisos were heightened due to issues with the gases coming from them. Commandant L'Herminier had SEMT Pielstick 12 PA 6 BTC diesels with infrared suppression systems installed which led to delays into the vessel's entry into service. In 1993, Commandant Blaison and Enseigne de vaisseau Jacoubet had their rocket launchers removed and a Syracuse II satcom terminal installed. Plans were drawn up to give the two ships a hangar and flight deck for helicopters, but this was abandoned.

From 2009, the remaining vessels in French service were reclassified as offshore patrol vessels (OPVs) and, as a result, had their surface-to-surface missiles and heavy anti-submarine weapons removed. The remaining vessels in the class are being incrementally withdrawn from service between 2024 and 2027.

Replacement of these vessels in French service is currently planned starting from 2028 by a new class of patrol vessels.

== Ships in the class ==
French Navy construction data
indicatif visuel	Name	Builder	Laid down	Launched	Commissioned	Status
F 781	D'Estienne d'Orves	Arsenal de Lorient, Lorient, France	1 September 1972	1 June 1973	10 September 1976	Decommissioned 1999, transferred to Turkey as TCG Beykoz (F-503); converted to testing and training role as of 2024
F 782	Amyot d'Inville	Arsenal de Lorient, Lorient, France	1 September 1973	30 November 1974	13 October 1976	Decommissioned 1999, transferred to Turkey as TCG Bartın (F-504)
F 783	Drogou	Arsenal de Lorient, Lorient, France	1 October 1973	30 November 1974	30 September 1976	Decommissioned 2000, transferred to Turkey as TCG Bodrum (F-501); decommissioned from Turkish service 2022
F 784	Détroyat	Arsenal de Lorient, Lorient, France	15 December 1974	31 January 1976	4 May 1977	Decommissioned 1997, scrapped at Ghent, Belgium in 2015
F 785	Jean Moulin	Arsenal de Lorient, Lorient, France	15 January 1975	31 January 1976	11 May 1977	Decommissioned 1999, scrapped at Ghent, Belgium in 2015
F 786	Quartier-Maître Anquetil	Arsenal de Lorient, Lorient, France	1 August 1975	7 August 1976	4 February 1978	Decommissioned 2000, transferred to Turkey as TCG Bandırma (F-502)
F 787	Commandant de Pimodan	Arsenal de Lorient, Lorient, France	1 September 1975	7 August 1976	20 May 1978	Decommissioned 2000, transferred to Turkey as TCG Bozcaada (F-500); retired from Turkish service in 2026
F 788	Second-Maître Le Bihan	Arsenal de Lorient, Lorient, France	1 November 1976	13 August 1977	7 July 1979	Decommissioned 2002, transferred to Turkey as TCG Bafra (F-505)
F 789	Lieutenant de vaisseau Le Hénaff	Arsenal de Lorient, Lorient, France	March 1977	16 September 1978	13 February 1980	Decommissioned 2020
F 790	Lieutenant de vaisseau Lavallée	Arsenal de Lorient, Lorient, France	11 November 1977	29 May 1979	16 August 1980	Decommissioned 2018
F 791	Commandant L'Herminier	Arsenal de Lorient, Lorient, France	7 May 1979	7 March 1981	19 January 1986	Decommissioned 2018
F 792	Premier-Maître L'Her	Arsenal de Lorient, Lorient, France	15 December 1978	28 June 1980	5 December 1981	Decommissioned June 2024; sunk as a target ship in December 2024
F 793	Commandant Blaison	Arsenal de Lorient, Lorient, France	15 November 1979	7 March 1981	28 April 1982	In service; retirement planned in 2027
F 794	Enseigne de vaisseau Jacoubet	Arsenal de Lorient, Lorient, France	April 1979	29 September 1981	23 October 1982	Decommissioned June 18th, 2026
F 795	Commandant Ducuing	Arsenal de Lorient, Lorient, France	1 October 1980	26 September 1981	17 March 1983	Out of service and inactive as of June 2025; decommissioned December 2025
F 796	Commandant Birot	Arsenal de Lorient, Lorient, France	23 March 1981	22 May 1982	14 March 1984	Decommissioned October 2025
F 797	Commandant Bouan (ex-Commandant Levasseur)	Arsenal de Lorient, Lorient, France	12 October 1981	23 May 1983	11 May 1984	Withdrawn from service 1 July 2026;

== South African and Argentine navies ==
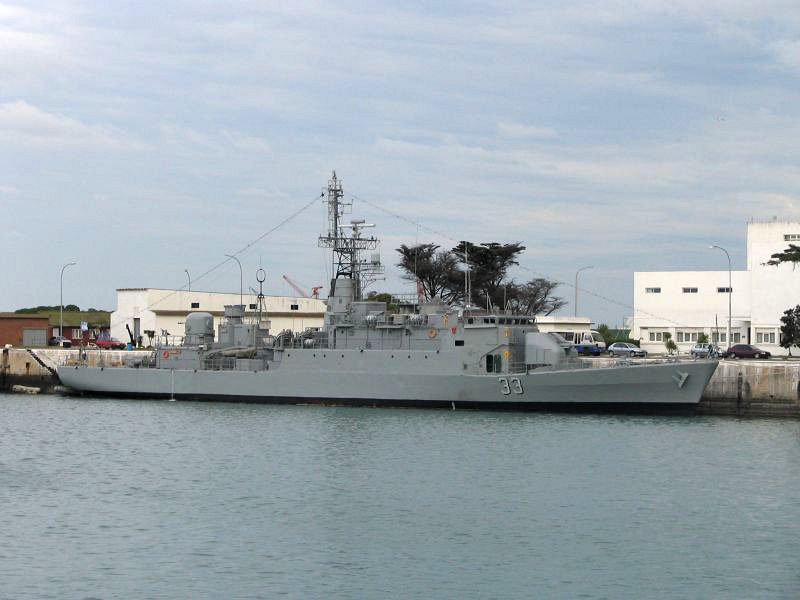
ARA Granville

The Argentine Navy also operated three D'Estienne d'Orves-class ships, locally known as the Drummond class. The first two ships, originally named Lieutenant de vaisseau Le Hénaff and Commandant L'Herminier while under construction for the French Navy, were later transferred for use on later vessels of the same class being built for the French Navy.

When they were acquired by the South African Navy in 1976, they were renamed Good Hope and Transvaal. However, due to an arms embargo imposed on South Africa by the United Nations Security Council in 1977, they were not delivered and were bought by the Argentine Navy instead on 25 December 1978. They were renamed again as ARA Drummond and ARA Guerrico. A third ship of the class, ARA Granville, was ordered by Argentina and was delivered in 1981. All vessels had been retired as of 2024.

== Turkish Navy ==
Starting in November 2000, Turkey acquired six Type A 69 avisos. They were acquired for the Turkish Navy for coastal patrol in order to release more capable Turkish ships for frontline duty. Five of the six vessels were refitted at Brest before transfer.
