= Patrouilleurs Hauturiers =

French patrol ship program

Class overview
- Name: Patrouilleurs Hauturiers
- Builders: Piriou Shipyard; CMN; Socarenam
- Operators: French Navy
- Preceded by: Flamant class; D'Estienne d'Orves class; P400 class
- Built: 2023–present
- In commission: Projected from 2028
- Planned: 10
- Building: 4

General characteristics
- Type: Offshore patrol vessel
- Displacement: 2,400 tons
- Length: 92 m (301 ft 10 in)
- Beam: 14.2 m (46 ft 7 in)
- Draught: 3.6 m (11 ft 10 in)
- Propulsion: diesel-electric drive
- Speed: 21 knots (39 km/h; 24 mph)
- Range: 6,000 nmi (11,000 km; 6,900 mi); 30 days
- Boats & landing craft carried: 1 × 7 m (23 ft) RHIB; 2 × 9.3 m (31 ft) RHIB
- Crew: Room for 84
- Sensors & processing systems: SETIS-C combat management system (CMS); NS54 4D AESA multi-function X-band naval radar; CERBAIR Hydra anti-drone system; Identification Friend or Foe (IFF) TSA 3522; BLUEWATCHER hull-mounted sonar
- Armament: 1 × 40CT main gun; Mistral Mk3 multi-role missiles(Not fitted at launch); 2 × 12.7 mm (0.50 in) machine guns; 1 × 7.62 mm (0.30 in) machine gun
- Aircraft carried: 1 × Airbus Helicopters H160 helicopter; 1 × VSR700 UAS

Patrouilleurs Hauturiers (English: Offshore patrol vessel), often shortened to PH, is a program to design and build ten long-range patrol boats for the French Navy. Formerly known as the Patrouilleurs Océanique (PO) program, the ships will replace various aging patrol vessels in a wide variety of tasks off France. Development began in 2020 and construction will occur in two batches, with all ships expected to be in service by 2035.

== Development ==
Initially known as the Patrouilleurs Océanique (English: Ocean Patrol) program, commonly shortened to PO, the program was unveiled in 2020 with the goal to design and develop a ten-ship series of patrol vessels to replace the aging Flamant, D'Estienne d'Orves, and P400-class patrol vessels. The ships' roles would include maritime patrol, protecting national waters, submarine escort, evacuation, surveillance, interception, protection of French interests, and other miscellaneous duties. The program was announced during a major overhaul of the French Navy, which occurs every 30–40 years.

Designed by Naval Group, the first seven ships were ordered in 2023 from Piriou Shipyard, Constructions Mécaniques de Normandie (CMN), and Socarenam. Construction of this batch began in 2024 and all seven are estimated to be in delivered by 2030. The remaining three ships are planned to be ordered as part of a later budget and are planned to enter service by 2035.

== Design ==
The new patrol ships will be significantly larger than their predecessors, allowing for an improved range of 6,000 nautical miles (11,000 km; 6,900 mi) at 21 knots (39 km/h; 24 mph), or, 30 days at sea through the diesel-electric drive. The ships would displace 2,400 tons, be 92 m (301 ft 10 in) long, have a beam of 14.2 m (46 ft 7 in), and a draft of 3.6 m (11 ft 10 in). Fitted on the bow is a 40CT, a 40 mm (1.6 in) multi-role autocannon that will serve as the main weapon. Immediately behind the gun is a panoramic bridge fitted with two 12.7 mm (0.50 in) machine guns. On top of the superstructure is space for future installation of a Mistral anti-air missile, located near the life rafts, and the ship's mast. The rest of the superstructure will include a 7 m (23 ft)-long RHIB on the deck and one 9.3 metres (31 ft)-long RHIB per side incorporated into the superstructure. Towards the aft is a hangar and helipad that can fit an Airbus H160M helicopter and a VSR700 UAS, with a 7.62 mm (0.30 in) machine gun on top of the hangar.

The French Navy states that there would be room for a total of 84 people on board, not specifying how many of those are crew members. One of the most unique elements of the design is the incorporation of active sonar capability, allowing the ships to track underwater targets in their mission to monitor and intercept submarines despite such tasks historically not being done by patrol ships.

== Ships ==
Every ship in the class is named for people who fought for Free France during the Second World War, in recognition of the war's 80th anniversary. In addition, the names would be the first time that a modern French ship would be named for women, aside from Joan of Arc.

No.	Name	Builder	Status	Contract	Laid down	Launched	Comm.	Notes
PH1	Trolley de Préveaux	Piriou (Concarneau shipyard)	Fitting out	17 Nov 2023	22 May 2024	5 Feb 2026	2028	Delivery to the DGA is planned for 2027, active service with the French Navy for 2028.
PH2	D'Estienne d'Orves	CMN (Cherbourg shipyard)	Under construction	17 Nov 2023	Feb 2025	–	2028	
PH3	Jeanne Bohec	Socarenam (Calais shipyard)	Under construction	17 Nov 2023	Jun 2025	–	2028 / 2029	
PH4	Premier maître Yves Nonen	Piriou (Concarneau shipyard)	Under construction	17 Nov 2023	Aug 2025	–	2029	
PH5	Jacqueline Carsignol	Socarenam (Calais shipyard)	On order	17 Nov 2023	–	–	2030	
PH6	Commandant Ducuing	CMN (Cherbourg shipyard)	On order	17 Nov 2023	–	–	2030	
PH7	Quartier maître Anquetil	Socarenam (Calais shipyard)	On order	17 Nov 2023	–	–	2030 / 2031	
PH8	Andrée Borrell	–	Planned to be ordered	TBA	–	–	–	–
PH9	Sein Island	–	Planned to be ordered	TBA	–	–	–	–
PH10	Émilienne Moreau	–	Planned to be ordered	TBA	–	–	–	–

Planned dates

== See also ==
- Future of the French Navy
- European Patrol Corvette
- Patrouilleur Outre-mer
