= Bofors 375 mm anti-submarine rocket =

Naval missile

Bofors 37.5 cm anti-submarine rocket launcher M/50
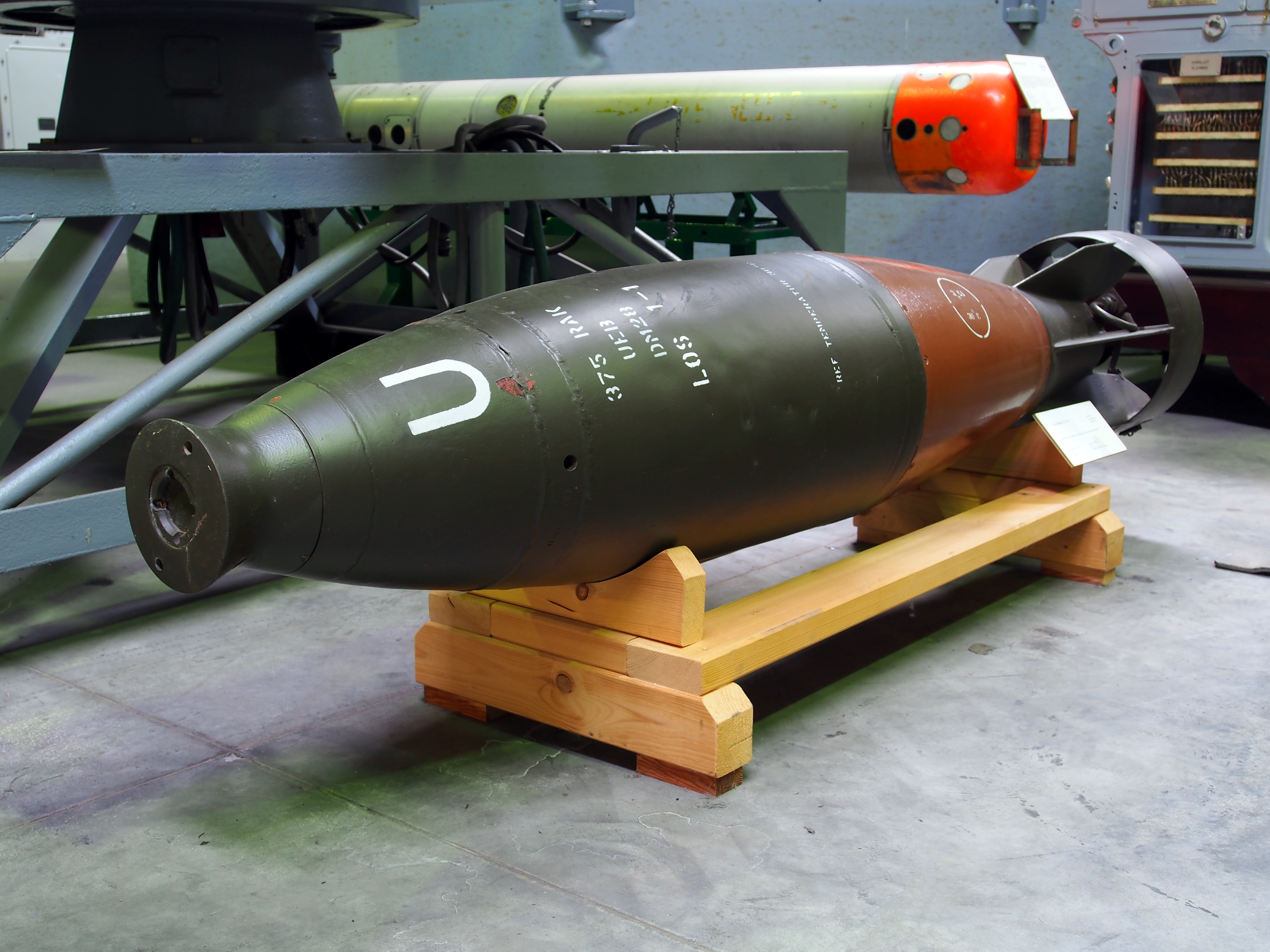
- Type: Anti-submarine rocket
- Place of origin: Sweden

Service history
- Used by: Sweden; Germany; France; Japan; Netherlands; Colombia; Turkey; Brazil; Bulgaria

Specifications
- Caliber: 375 mm (14.8 in)
- Barrels: 2-6
- Maximum firing range: 3,625 m (11,893 ft)
- Warhead: High explosive
- Detonation mechanism: Acoustic Proximity Fuse
- Engine: rocket
- Propellant: Solid fuel
- Launch platform: Ships

The 375 mm ASW rocket family is an ahead-throwing anti-submarine rocket system developed by Bofors. The system has three types of launcher with either two, four, or six barrels, and entered service in the 1950s.

Sweden used the four-barreled system on the Halland and Visby-class destroyers, while the Netherlands deployed it on the Friesland-class destroyers. France built the four-barrelled system under licence then developed the six-barrel system and used it on many classes of warship including T 47 (Surcouf) and T 53-class (Duperré) destroyers, as well as the A69 (D'Estienne d'Orves-class avisos (corvettes) mainly designed for coastal anti-submarine defense and ocean escort missions. Turkey continues to use the six-barrel version in the A69 avisos it acquired and operates as Burak-class corvettes. The two-barrel version was used by Royal Malaysian Navy on the Kasturi-class corvettes before they removed it from the ships, and Brazil uses it on six Niterói-class frigates of which 5 are still in service as of 2025.

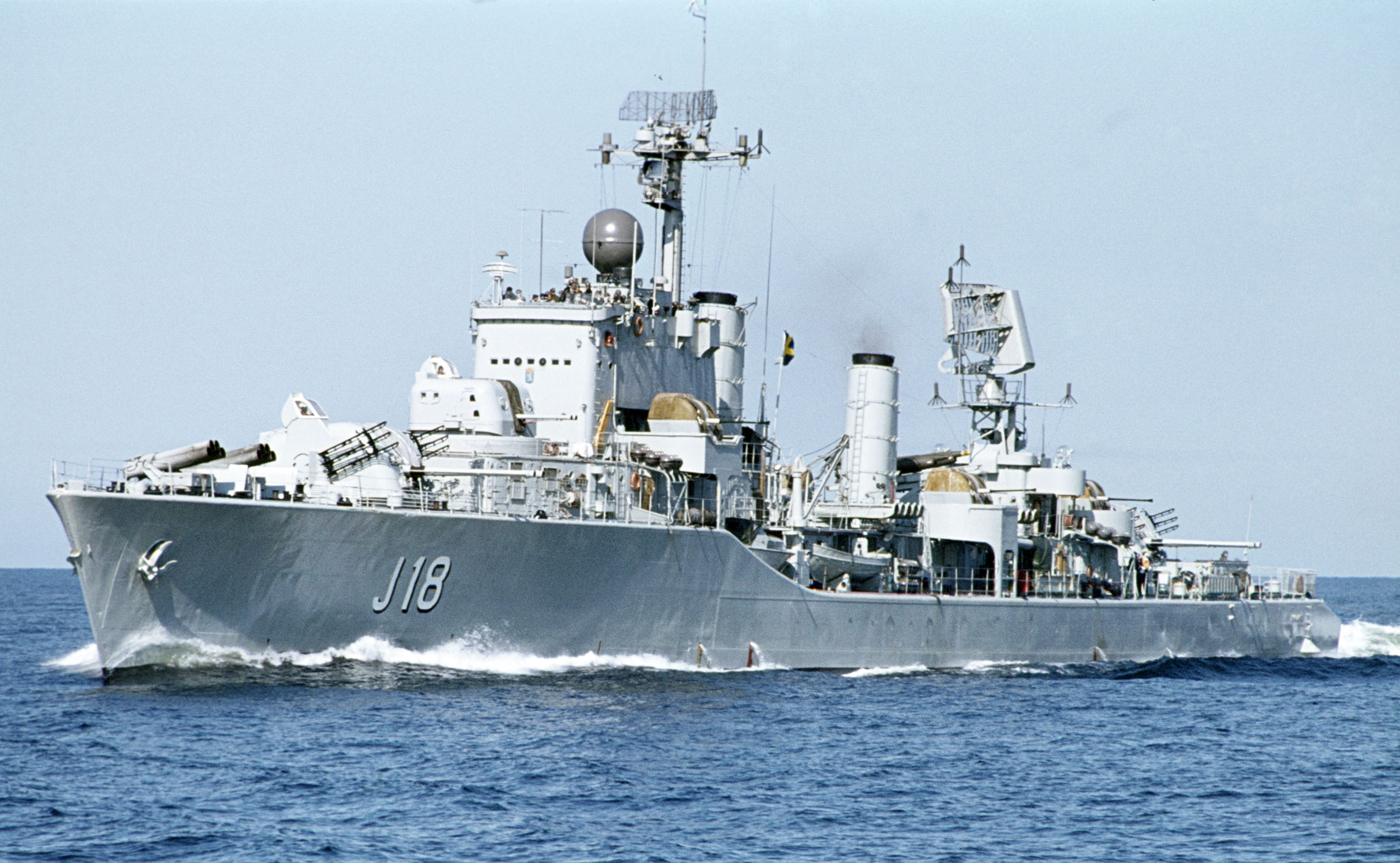
HSwMS Halland with dual 375mm m/50 on the bow

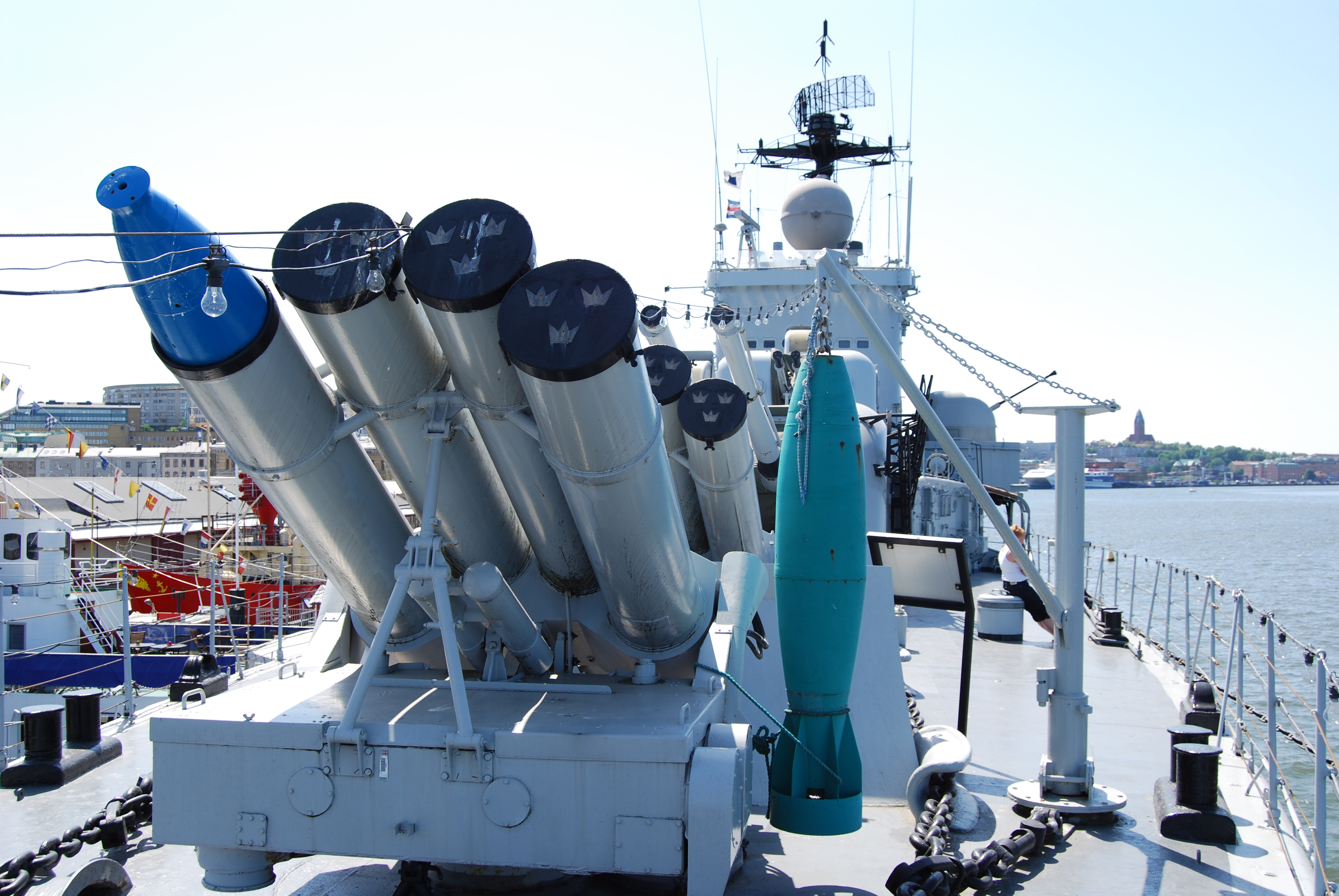
375mm launchers on HSwMS Småland

== Other unguided ASW systems ==
- Limbo
- Squid
- Hedgehog
- RBU-6000
- Weapon Alpha
- Terne
