= Standing NATO Maritime Group 2 =

- Active: 1992–present
- Allegiance: (NATO) North Atlantic Treaty Organization

Commanders
- Current commander: Rear Admiral Cristian Nardone, Italian Navy

Standing NATO Maritime Group 2 (SNMG2) is a North Atlantic Treaty Organization (NATO) standing maritime immediate reaction force. SNMG2 consists of four to six destroyers and frigates. Its role is to provide NATO with an immediate operational response capability.

== History ==
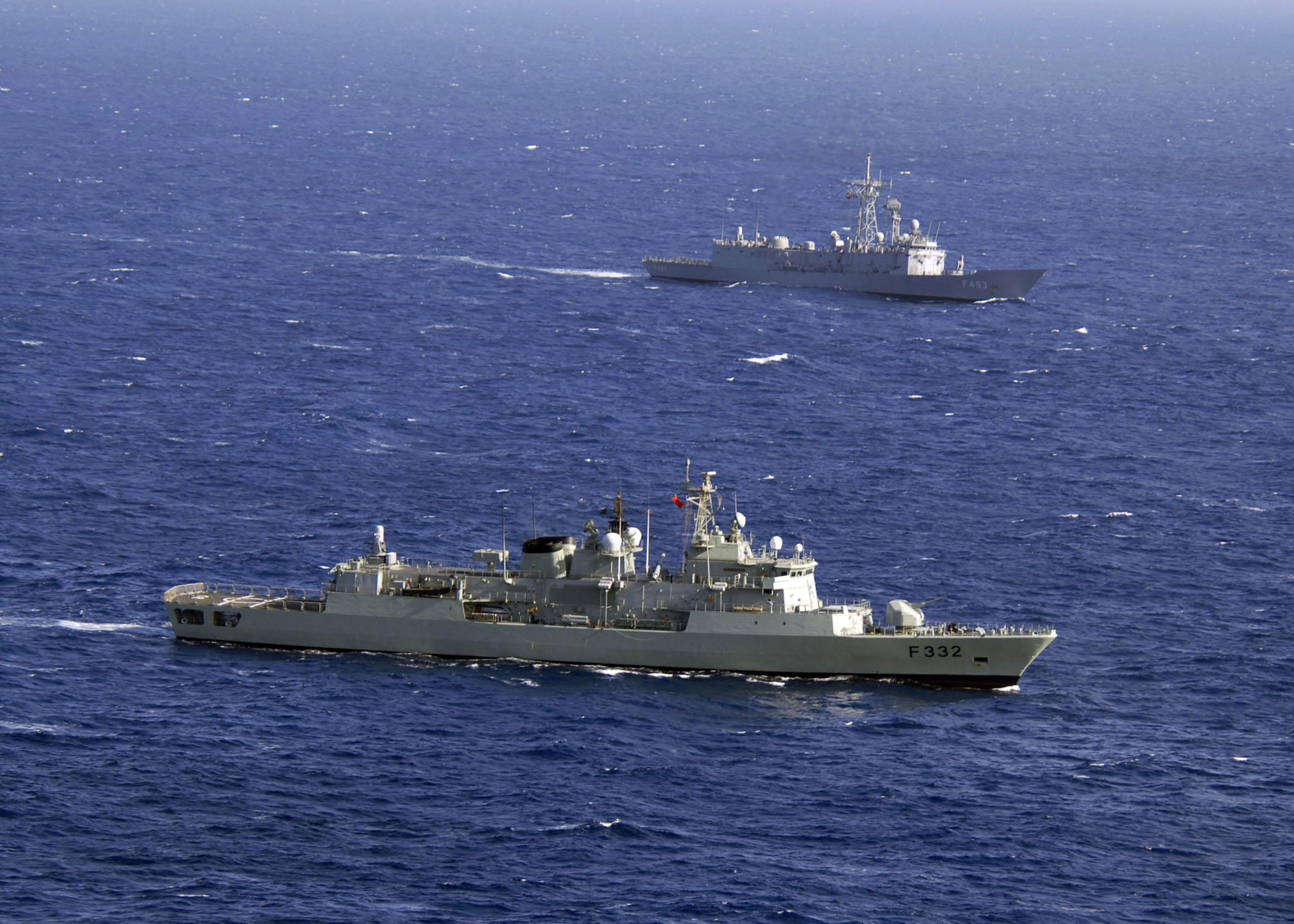
Portuguese frigate NRP Corte Real and Turkish frigate TCG Gelibolu, participating in SNMG-2 during Phoenix Express (PE 08).

Standing Naval Force Mediterranean (STANAVFORMED) was activated on 30 April 1992, at Naples, Italy. STANAVFORMED was the successor to the NATO Naval On-Call Force Mediterranean (NAVOCFORMED) – which had been periodically activated for more than 20 years.

During the 1990s, STANAVFORMED was heavily involved in Operation Maritime Monitor (July 1992 to November 1992), Operation Maritime Guard (November 1992 to June 1993) and Operation Sharp Guard (June 1993 to October 1996), the maritime embargo operations in the Adriatic Sea established to ensure compliance by Serbia and Montenegro with United Nations (UN) resolutions 713, 715, 787, 820 and 943. Between November 1992 and June 1996 some 74,000 ships were challenged, almost 6,000 were inspected at sea and more than 1,400 were diverted and inspected in port.

On 6 October 2001, STANAVFORMED deployed to the Eastern Mediterranean Sea in support of Operation Active Endeavour, NATO's maritime contribution to prevent the movement of terrorists or weapons of mass destruction.

The force was re-designated Standing NATO Maritime Group 2 in January 2005.

From June 2009 to August 2009 SNMG2 was deployed by NATO off the Somali coast to conduct Operation Allied Protector, to deter, defend and protect World Food Programme (WFP) vessels against the threat of piracy and armed robbery, thereby allowing WFP to fulfill its mission of providing humanitarian aid.

Since August 2009, SNMG2 has been providing ships for NATO's Operation Ocean Shield anti-piracy mission in the Gulf of Aden.

In 2019, SNMG2 was tasked with patrol of the Mediterranean Sea and Black Sea. In 2021, SNMG2 took part in Exercise Sea Breeze 2021 in the Black Sea, co-hosted by the Ukrainian Navy and the United States Sixth Fleet.

== Current ships ==
In 2026, SNMG2 consisted of:

Previous flagship
Current flagship

Ships in bold are currently part of the naval force

| Year | Commander | Ship | Type | Part of task force | Flagship |
|---|---|---|---|---|---|
| 2026 | (Italy); Rear Admiral; Cristian Nardone (January 1 – June 29) (Greece); Commodore; Georgios Kypriotis (June 29 – ongoing) | (Italy) ITS Virginio Fasan | Carlo Bergamini-class frigate | January – June | January – June |
| 2026 | (Italy); Rear Admiral; Cristian Nardone (January 1 – June 29) (Greece); Commodore; Georgios Kypriotis (June 29 – ongoing) | (Greece) HS Limnos | Elli class frigate | January - unknown | n/a |
| 2026 | (Italy); Rear Admiral; Cristian Nardone (January 1 – June 29) (Greece); Commodore; Georgios Kypriotis (June 29 – ongoing) | (France) HS Guépratte | La Fayette-class frigate | unknown - unknown | n/a |
| 2026 | (Italy); Rear Admiral; Cristian Nardone (January 1 – June 29) (Greece); Commodore; Georgios Kypriotis (June 29 – ongoing) | (Greece) **HS Kountouriotis** | Kortenaer-class frigate | June – ongoing | June – ongoing |
| 2026 | (Italy); Rear Admiral; Cristian Nardone (January 1 – June 29) (Greece); Commodore; Georgios Kypriotis (June 29 – ongoing) | (Germany) **FGS Berlin** | Berlin-class replenishment oiler | unknown - ongoing | n/a |
| 2026 | (Italy); Rear Admiral; Cristian Nardone (January 1 – June 29) (Greece); Commodore; Georgios Kypriotis (June 29 – ongoing) | (Italy) **ITS Raimondo Montecuccoli** | Thaon di Revel-class patrol vessel | unknown - ongoing | n/a |

== Previous task groups ==
In 2025, SNMG2 consisted of:

Previous flagship
Current flagship

Ships in bold are currently part of the naval force

| Year | Commander | Ship | Type | Part of task force | Flagship |
|---|---|---|---|---|---|
| 2025 | (Turkey); Rear Admiral; H. Ilker Avci (January – 4 July) (Italy); Rear Admiral; Francesco Iavazzo (4 July – 31 December) | (Turkey) TCG Kemalreis | Barbaros-class-class frigate | January – July | January – July |
| 2025 | (Turkey); Rear Admiral; H. Ilker Avci (January – 4 July) (Italy); Rear Admiral; Francesco Iavazzo (4 July – 31 December) | (Italy) ITS Carlo Bergamini | Carlo Bergamini-class destroyer | July – December | July – December |
| 2025 | (Turkey); Rear Admiral; H. Ilker Avci (January – 4 July) (Italy); Rear Admiral; Francesco Iavazzo (4 July – 31 December) | (Canada) HMCS St. John's | Halifax-class frigate | July – December | n/a |
| 2025 | (Turkey); Rear Admiral; H. Ilker Avci (January – 4 July) (Italy); Rear Admiral; Francesco Iavazzo (4 July – 31 December) | (Spain) ESPS Cantabria | Replenishment oiler | unknown – unknown | n/a |

In 2024, SNMG2 consisted of:

Previous flagship
Current flagship

Ships in bold are currently part of the naval force

| Year | Commander | Ship | Type | Part of task force | Flagship |
|---|---|---|---|---|---|
| 2024 | (Italy); Rear Admiral; Pasquale Esposito (January – 1 July) (Canada); Commodore; Matthew Coates (1 July – 3 December) (Turkey); Rear Admiral; H. Ilker Avci (3 December – ongoing) | (Italy) ITS Carlo Bergamini | Carlo Bergamini-class destroyer | January – n/a | January – n/a |
| 2024 | (Italy); Rear Admiral; Pasquale Esposito (January – 1 July) (Canada); Commodore; Matthew Coates (1 July – 3 December) (Turkey); Rear Admiral; H. Ilker Avci (3 December – ongoing) | (Canada) HMCS Charlottetown | Halifax-class frigate | 1 July – 3 December | 1 July – 3 December |
| 2024 | (Italy); Rear Admiral; Pasquale Esposito (January – 1 July) (Canada); Commodore; Matthew Coates (1 July – 3 December) (Turkey); Rear Admiral; H. Ilker Avci (3 December – ongoing) | (Spain) ESPS Cristóbal Colón | Álvaro de Bazán-class frigate | 1 July – 3 December | n/a |
| 2024 | (Italy); Rear Admiral; Pasquale Esposito (January – 1 July) (Canada); Commodore; Matthew Coates (1 July – 3 December) (Turkey); Rear Admiral; H. Ilker Avci (3 December – ongoing) | (Turkey) TCG Yıldırım | Yavuz-class frigate | 1 July – 3 December | n/a |
| 2024 | (Italy); Rear Admiral; Pasquale Esposito (January – 1 July) (Canada); Commodore; Matthew Coates (1 July – 3 December) (Turkey); Rear Admiral; H. Ilker Avci (3 December – ongoing) | (Turkey) TCG Kemalreis | Barbaros-class-class frigate | 3 December – ongoing | 3 December – ongoing |

In 2023, SNMG2 consisted of:

Previous flagship
Current flagship

Ships in bold are currently part of the naval force

| Year | Commander | Ship | Type | Part of task force | Flagship |
|---|---|---|---|---|---|
| 2023 | (United States); Rear Admiral; Michael Scott Sciretta (January – July) (United Kingdom); Commodore; Paul Stroude (July – 7 December) (Italy); Rear Admiral; Pasquale Esposito (7 December – n/a) | (United States) USS James E. Williams | Arleigh Burke-class destroyer | January – July | January – July |
| 2023 | (United States); Rear Admiral; Michael Scott Sciretta (January – July) (United Kingdom); Commodore; Paul Stroude (July – 7 December) (Italy); Rear Admiral; Pasquale Esposito (7 December – n/a) | (Italy) ITS Carlo Margottini | Bergamini-class frigate | January – n/a | n/a |
| 2023 | (United States); Rear Admiral; Michael Scott Sciretta (January – July) (United Kingdom); Commodore; Paul Stroude (July – 7 December) (Italy); Rear Admiral; Pasquale Esposito (7 December – n/a) | (Turkey) TCG Barbaros | Barbaros-class frigate | January – n/a | n/a |
| 2023 | (United States); Rear Admiral; Michael Scott Sciretta (January – July) (United Kingdom); Commodore; Paul Stroude (July – 7 December) (Italy); Rear Admiral; Pasquale Esposito (7 December – n/a) | (Greece) HS Psara | Hydra-class frigate | January – n/a | n/a |
| 2023 | (United States); Rear Admiral; Michael Scott Sciretta (January – July) (United Kingdom); Commodore; Paul Stroude (July – 7 December) (Italy); Rear Admiral; Pasquale Esposito (7 December – n/a) | (Canada) HMCS Fredericton | Halifax-class frigate | January – n/a | n/a |
| 2023 | (United States); Rear Admiral; Michael Scott Sciretta (January – July) (United Kingdom); Commodore; Paul Stroude (July – 7 December) (Italy); Rear Admiral; Pasquale Esposito (7 December – n/a) | (United Kingdom) HMS Duncan | Type 45 Destroyer | July – 7 December | July – 7 December |
| 2023 | (United States); Rear Admiral; Michael Scott Sciretta (January – July) (United Kingdom); Commodore; Paul Stroude (July – 7 December) (Italy); Rear Admiral; Pasquale Esposito (7 December – n/a) | (Italy) ITS Carlo Bergamini | Carlo Bergamini-class destroyer | 7 December – n/a | 7 December – n/a |

In 2022, SNMG2 consisted of:

Previous flagship
Current flagship

Ships in bold are currently part of the naval force

| Year | Commander | Ship | Type | Part of task force | Flagship |
|---|---|---|---|---|---|
| 2022 | (Italy); Rear Admiral; Mauro Panebianco (January – July) (United States); Rear Admiral; Michael Scott Sciretta (1 July – July 2023) | (Italy) ITS Carlo Margottini | Bergamini-class frigate | January – July | January – July |
| 2022 | (Italy); Rear Admiral; Mauro Panebianco (January – July) (United States); Rear Admiral; Michael Scott Sciretta (1 July – July 2023) | (Turkey) TCG Göksu | Oliver Hazard Perry-class frigate | January – April | n/a |
| 2022 | (Italy); Rear Admiral; Mauro Panebianco (January – July) (United States); Rear Admiral; Michael Scott Sciretta (1 July – July 2023) | (Germany) FGS Lübeck | Bremen-class frigate | January – 1 June | n/a |
| 2022 | (Italy); Rear Admiral; Mauro Panebianco (January – July) (United States); Rear Admiral; Michael Scott Sciretta (1 July – July 2023) | (Spain) ESPS Blas de Lezo | Álvaro de Bazán-class frigate | 22 January – 30 June | n/a |
| 2022 | (Italy); Rear Admiral; Mauro Panebianco (January – July) (United States); Rear Admiral; Michael Scott Sciretta (1 July – July 2023) | (France) FS Auvergne | Aquitaine-class frigate | 22 February – May | n/a |
| 2022 | (Italy); Rear Admiral; Mauro Panebianco (January – July) (United States); Rear Admiral; Michael Scott Sciretta (1 July – July 2023) | (United Kingdom) HMS Trent | River-class offshore patrol vessel | February – March | n/a |
| 2022 | (Italy); Rear Admiral; Mauro Panebianco (January – July) (United States); Rear Admiral; Michael Scott Sciretta (1 July – July 2023) | (Greece) HS Aegean | Elli-class frigate | March – | n/a |
| 2022 | (Italy); Rear Admiral; Mauro Panebianco (January – July) (United States); Rear Admiral; Michael Scott Sciretta (1 July – July 2023) | (Italy) ITS Stromboli | Stromboli-class replenishment oiler | March – | n/a |
| 2022 | (Italy); Rear Admiral; Mauro Panebianco (January – July) (United States); Rear Admiral; Michael Scott Sciretta (1 July – July 2023) | (Canada) HMCS Montréal | Halifax-class frigate | March – July | n/a |
| 2022 | (Italy); Rear Admiral; Mauro Panebianco (January – July) (United States); Rear Admiral; Michael Scott Sciretta (1 July – July 2023) | (United Kingdom) HMS Diamond | Type 45 destroyer | March – April | n/a |
| 2022 | (Italy); Rear Admiral; Mauro Panebianco (January – July) (United States); Rear Admiral; Michael Scott Sciretta (1 July – July 2023) | (Turkey) TCG Barbaros | Barbaros-class frigate | 24 March – 30 May | n/a |
| 2022 | (Italy); Rear Admiral; Mauro Panebianco (January – July) (United States); Rear Admiral; Michael Scott Sciretta (1 July – July 2023) | (France) FS Alsace | Aquitaine-class frigate | 4 April – May | n/a |
| 2022 | (Italy); Rear Admiral; Mauro Panebianco (January – July) (United States); Rear Admiral; Michael Scott Sciretta (1 July – July 2023) | (Spain) ESPS Cantabria | Replenishment oiler | 10 May – 26 June | n/a |
| 2022 | (Italy); Rear Admiral; Mauro Panebianco (January – July) (United States); Rear Admiral; Michael Scott Sciretta (1 July – July 2023) | (France) FS Forbin | Horizon-class frigate | May – 16 June | n/a |
| 2022 | (Italy); Rear Admiral; Mauro Panebianco (January – July) (United States); Rear Admiral; Michael Scott Sciretta (1 July – July 2023) | (Germany) FGS Bonn | Berlin-class replenishment ship | 29 May – June | n/a |
| 2022 | (Italy); Rear Admiral; Mauro Panebianco (January – July) (United States); Rear Admiral; Michael Scott Sciretta (1 July – July 2023) | (Turkey) TCG Salihreis | Barbaros-class frigate | 30 May – July | n/a |
| 2022 | (Italy); Rear Admiral; Mauro Panebianco (January – July) (United States); Rear Admiral; Michael Scott Sciretta (1 July – July 2023) | (France) FS Provence | Aquitaine-class frigate | 16 June – 31 July | n/a |
| 2022 | (Italy); Rear Admiral; Mauro Panebianco (January – July) (United States); Rear Admiral; Michael Scott Sciretta (1 July – July 2023) | (United States) USS Forrest Sherman | Arleigh Burke-class destroyer | 1 July – 13 December | 1 July – 13 December |
| 2022 | (Italy); Rear Admiral; Mauro Panebianco (January – July) (United States); Rear Admiral; Michael Scott Sciretta (1 July – July 2023) | (Turkey) TCG Kemalreis | Barbaros-class frigate | 1 July – September | n/a |
| 2022 | (Italy); Rear Admiral; Mauro Panebianco (January – July) (United States); Rear Admiral; Michael Scott Sciretta (1 July – July 2023) | (Italy) ITS Vulcano | Logistic support ship | 14 July – 28 July | n/a |
| 2022 | (Italy); Rear Admiral; Mauro Panebianco (January – July) (United States); Rear Admiral; Michael Scott Sciretta (1 July – July 2023) | (Greece) HS Kountouriotis | Kortenaer-class frigate | 20 July – August | n/a |
| 2022 | (Italy); Rear Admiral; Mauro Panebianco (January – July) (United States); Rear Admiral; Michael Scott Sciretta (1 July – July 2023) | (Spain) ESPS Almirante Juan de Borbón | Álvaro de Bazán-class frigate | 24 July – 6 September | n/a |
| 2022 | (Italy); Rear Admiral; Mauro Panebianco (January – July) (United States); Rear Admiral; Michael Scott Sciretta (1 July – July 2023) | (France) FS Languedoc | Aquitaine-class frigate | 31 July – 6 September | n/a |
| 2022 | (Italy); Rear Admiral; Mauro Panebianco (January – July) (United States); Rear Admiral; Michael Scott Sciretta (1 July – July 2023) | (Germany) FGS Bonn | Berlin-class replenishment ship | 16 August – September | n/a |
| 2022 | (Italy); Rear Admiral; Mauro Panebianco (January – July) (United States); Rear Admiral; Michael Scott Sciretta (1 July – July 2023) | (Italy) ITS Antonio Marceglia | Bergamini-class frigate | 21 August – September | n/a |
| 2022 | (Italy); Rear Admiral; Mauro Panebianco (January – July) (United States); Rear Admiral; Michael Scott Sciretta (1 July – July 2023) | (Spain) ESPS Cristóbal Colón | Álvaro de Bazán-class frigate | 13 September – 30 November | n/a |
| 2022 | (Italy); Rear Admiral; Mauro Panebianco (January – July) (United States); Rear Admiral; Michael Scott Sciretta (1 July – July 2023) | (Turkey) TCG Gemlik | G-class frigate | September – December | n/a |
| 2022 | (Italy); Rear Admiral; Mauro Panebianco (January – July) (United States); Rear Admiral; Michael Scott Sciretta (1 July – July 2023) | (France) FS Provence | Aquitaine-class frigate | September – December | n/a |
| 2022 | (Italy); Rear Admiral; Mauro Panebianco (January – July) (United States); Rear Admiral; Michael Scott Sciretta (1 July – July 2023) | (Italy) ITS Alpino | Bergamini-class frigate | September – December | n/a |
| 2022 | (Italy); Rear Admiral; Mauro Panebianco (January – July) (United States); Rear Admiral; Michael Scott Sciretta (1 July – July 2023) | (United States) USS James E. Williams | Arleigh Burke-class destroyer | 13 December – July 2023 | 13 December – July 2023 |

In 2021, SNMG2 consisted of:

Previous flagship
Current flagship

| Year | Commander | Ship | Type | Part of task force | Flagship |
|---|---|---|---|---|---|
| 2021 | (Italy); Rear Admiral; Stefano Russo | (Spain) ESPS Cristóbal Colón | Álvaro de Bazán-class frigate | January – March | January – March |
| 2021 | (Italy); Rear Admiral; Stefano Russo | (Germany) Brandenburg | Brandenburg-class frigate | January – February | n/a |
| 2021 | (Italy); Rear Admiral; Stefano Russo | (Greece) HS Machitis | Osprey HSY-56A-class gunboat | January – February | n/a |
| 2021 | (Italy); Rear Admiral; Stefano Russo | (Greece) HS Simeoforos Simitzopoulos | Osprey HSY-56A-class gunboat | January – February | n/a |
| 2021 | (Italy); Rear Admiral; Stefano Russo | (Greece) HS Armatolos | Osprey HSY-56A-class gunboat | January – February | n/a |
| 2021 | (Italy); Rear Admiral; Stefano Russo | (Greece) HS Plotarchis Maridakis | Osprey HSY-56A-class gunboat | January – February | n/a |
| 2021 | (Italy); Rear Admiral; Stefano Russo | (Turkey) TCG Türkeli | Tuzla-class patrol boat | January – March; May – August | n/a |
| 2021 | (Italy); Rear Admiral; Stefano Russo | (Spain) Patiño | Replenishment oiler | January – February | n/a |
| 2021 | (Italy); Rear Admiral; Stefano Russo | (Italy) ITS Virginio Fasan | Carlo Bergamini-class frigate | February – March | n/a |
| 2021 | (Italy); Rear Admiral; Stefano Russo | (Turkey) TCG Kemalreis | Barbaros-class-class frigate | February – May | n/a |
| 2021 | (Italy); Rear Admiral; Stefano Russo | (Greece) HS Kountouriotis | Kortenaer-class frigate | February – March | n/a |
| 2021 | (Italy); Rear Admiral; Stefano Russo | (Greece) HS Navmachos | Osprey HSY-56A-class gunboat | February – March | n/a |
| 2021 | (Italy); Rear Admiral; Stefano Russo | (Greece) HS Xenos | Fast attack craft | February – March | n/a |
| 2021 | (Italy); Rear Admiral; Stefano Russo | (Greece) HS Tolmi | Asheville-class gunboat | February – May | n/a |
| 2021 | (Italy); Rear Admiral; Stefano Russo | (Germany) FGS Werra | Replenishment oiler | February – August | n/a |
| 2021 | (Italy); Rear Admiral; Stefano Russo | (Turkey) TCG Karaburn | Osprey HSY-56A-class gunboat | March – May | n/a |
| 2021 | (Italy); Rear Admiral; Stefano Russo | (Romania) Regina Maria | Type 22 frigate | March – April | n/a |
| 2021 | (Italy); Rear Admiral; Stefano Russo | (Bulgaria) Smeli | Frigate | March – April | n/a |
| 2021 | (Italy); Rear Admiral; Stefano Russo | (Spain) ESPS Méndez Núñez | Álvaro de Bazán-class frigate | April – August | April – August |
| 2021 | (Italy); Rear Admiral; Stefano Russo | (Greece) HS Kasos | Osprey HSY-56A-class gunboat | May – August | n/a |
| 2021 | (Italy); Rear Admiral; Stefano Russo | (Greece) HS Aittitos | Osprey HSY-56A-class gunboat | May – August | n/a |
| 2021 | (Italy); Rear Admiral; Stefano Russo | (Greece) HS Degiannis | Fast attack craft | May – August | n/a |
| 2021 | (Italy); Rear Admiral; Stefano Russo | (Germany) FGS Lübeck | Bremen-class frigate | May – September | n/a |
| 2021 | (Italy); Rear Admiral; Stefano Russo | (Turkey) TCG Kumkale | Tuzla-class patrol boat | June – August | n/a |
| 2021 | (Italy); Rear Admiral; Stefano Russo | (United Kingdom) HMS Kent | Type 23 frigate | June – August | n/a |
| 2021 | (Italy); Rear Admiral; Stefano Russo | (Italy) ITS Virginio Fasan | Carlo Bergamini-class frigate | August – December | August – December |
| 2021 | (Italy); Rear Admiral; Stefano Russo | (Spain) ESPS Cantabria | Replenishment oiler | August – October | n/a |
| 2021 | (Italy); Rear Admiral; Stefano Russo | (Turkey) TCG Gökçeada | Oliver Hazard Perry-class frigate | September – December | n/a |
| 2021 | (Italy); Rear Admiral; Stefano Russo | (Germany) FGS Spessart | Rhön-class tanker | September – December | n/a |
| 2021 | (Italy); Rear Admiral; Stefano Russo | (Italy) ITS Carlo Margottini | Carlo Bergamini-class frigate | December – July 2022 | December – July 2022 |

== Organization ==
SNMG2 is a component of the NATO Response Force (NRF).

== See also ==
- Standing NATO Maritime Group 1
- Standing NATO Mine Countermeasures Group 1
- Standing NATO Mine Countermeasures Group 2
