= TCG Oruçreis (F 245) =

Owned by Turkish Navy, in barbaros class frigate

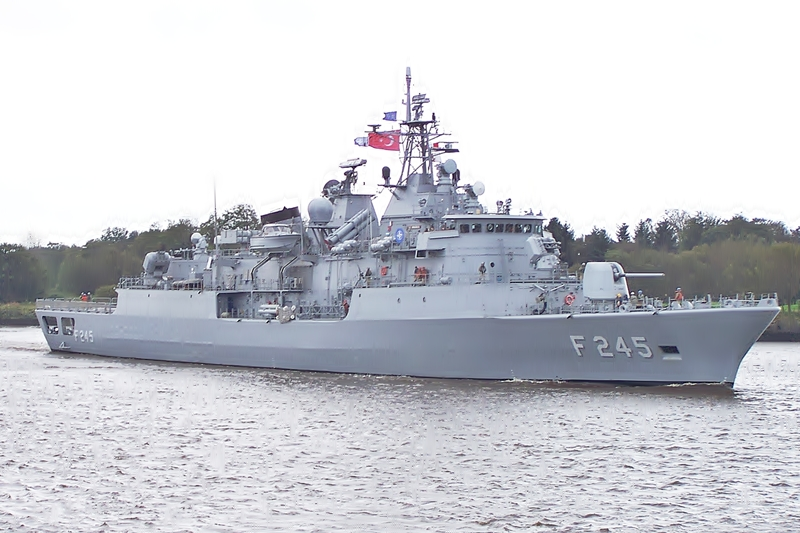
- TCG Oruçreis (F 245) in River Clyde, 3 October 2011

History

Turkey
- Name: Oruçreis
- Namesake: Oruç Reis
- Builder: Gölcük Naval Shipyard
- Launched: 28 July 1994
- Commissioned: 23 May 1997
- Identification: Pennant number: F 245; MMSI number: 271035023; Callsign: TBJY
- Status: in active service

General characteristics
- Class & type: Barbaros-class frigate
- Displacement: 3,380 t
- Length: 116.70 m (382.9 ft)
- Beam: 14.80 m (48.6 ft)
- Draft: 4.30 m (14.1 ft)
- Installed power: 60,000 hp (45,000 kW)
- Propulsion: CODOG; 2× controllable-pitch propellers; 2× GE LM2500 gas turbines; 2× MTU Diesel engines
- Speed: 16.70 knots (30.93 km/h; 19.22 mph) (service); 32 knots (59 km/h; 37 mph) (on gas turbine); 22 knots (41 km/h; 25 mph) (on diesel)
- Range: 4,100 nmi (7,600 km; 4,700 mi) at 18 knots (33 km/h; 21 mph)
- Crew: 21 officers, 92 petty officers, 11 specialized sergeants, 46 privates
- Sensors & processing systems: Decca 2040 BT; AWS-9; HSA D08; HSA STIR −24; HSA STIR 18; SQS-56
- Electronic warfare & decoys: Racal Cutlass; Racal Scorpion; Mk 36 decoy
- Armament: 2× MK 141 quad cell launchers for 8× RGM-84 Harpoon; 1× Mk 41 Mod 8 VLS for 16× RIM-162 ESSM Sea Sparrow PDMS (SAM); 1× 5"/54 caliber Mark 45 gun; 3× Oerlikon-Contraves Sea Zenith 25mm CIWS gun systems (Replaced with Aselsan GOKDENIZ and Phalanx CIWS after the mid-life upgrade); 2× Mark 32 Surface Vessel Torpedo Tubes; 2× ASELSAN STOP RCWS with 25mm autocannon (added after the mid-life upgrade)
- Aircraft carried: 1 helicopter

TCG Oruçreis (F 245), is a Barbaros-class frigate of the Turkish Navy, the second ship of that class. She was named for Oruç Reis (c. 1474–1518), the Ottoman Beylerbeyi of the West Mediterranean. The submarine TCG Oruç Reis was the first ship of that name in the Turkish Navy.

== Design and description ==
The vessel is 118 m (387 ft 2 in) long, has a beam of 14.80 m (48 ft 7 in) and a draft of 4.30 m (14 ft 1 in). She has a displacement of 3,380 t at full load. She has CODOG machinery, with two controllable-pitch propellers powered by four GE LM2500 gas turbines, which generate 60,000 hp (45,000 kW), and two MTU 20V 1163 Diesel engines generating 13,060 hp (9,740 kW). Ship's service speed is 16.70 knots (30.93 km/h; 19.22 mph) while top speeds are 32 knots (59 km/h; 37 mph) on gas turbine and 22 knots (41 km/h; 25 mph) on diesel only. The service range reaches 4,100 nmi (7,600 km; 4,700 mi) at 18 knots (33 km/h; 21 mph). She carries a helicopter of type S-70B Seahawk or Agusta-Bell AB-212 ASW. Personnel on duty are 21 officers, 92 petty officers, 11 specialized sergeants and 46 privates.

Ship sensors, radars and processing systems are Decca 2040 BT, AWS-9, HSA D08, HSA STIR −24, HSA STIR 18 and SQS-56. Electronic warfare and decoys installed on board are Racal Cutlass, Racal Scorpion and Mk 36 decoy. The frigate's armament include two MK 141 quad-cell launchers for eight RGM-84 Harpoon, one Mk 41 Mod 8 VLS for 16 RIM-162 ESSM Sea Sparrow PDMS (surface-to-air missile), one 5"/54 caliber Mark 45 gun, three Oerlikon-Contraves Sea Zenith 25mm CIWS gun systems and two Mark 32 Surface Vessel Torpedo Tubes.

== Construction and career ==
The ship was built at Gölcük Naval Shipyard. She was launched on 28 July 1994 and commissioned on 23 May 1997.

As part of the "Barbaros Turkish Navy Task Group", she sailed along with the frigate TCG Gediz (F 495), the corvette TCG Heybeliada (F 511) and the support ship TCG Yarbay Kudret Güngör (A 595) to Lagos, Nigeria in April 2014. Members of the Turkish Task Group provided training to the Nigerian Navy and the Nigerian Coast Guard personnel on fighting against piracy, ship board safety and explosives.
