= TCG Fatih =

Barbaros-class frigate of the Turkish Navy

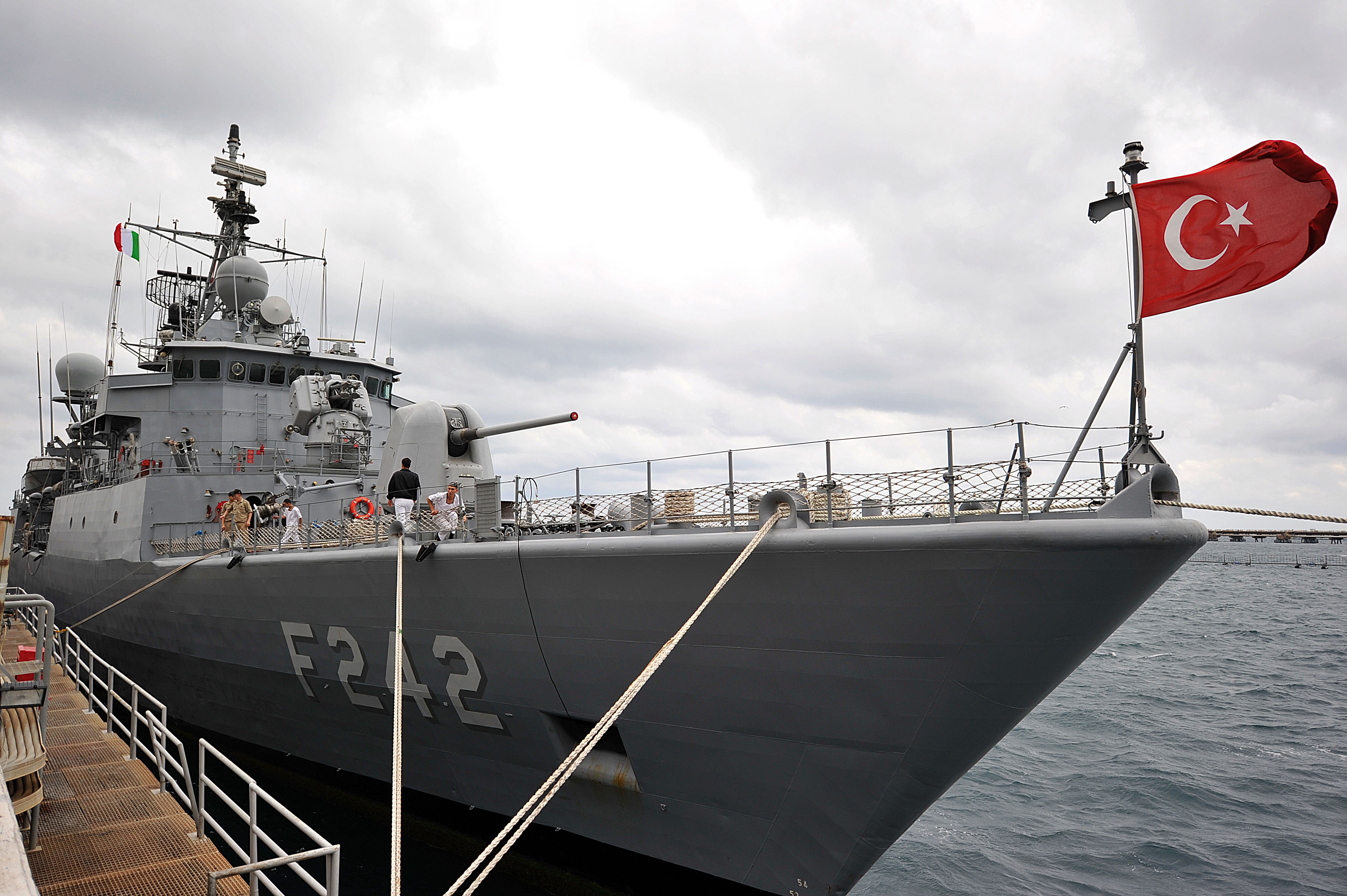
- TCG Fatih on 2 June 2014

History

Turkey
- Name: Fatih
- Namesake: Mehmed the Conqueror
- Builder: Gölcük Naval Shipyard, Kocaeli, Turkey
- Launched: 24 April 1987
- Commissioned: 12 October 1988
- Identification: Pennant number: F 242
- Status: Active

General characteristics
- Class & type: Yavuz-class frigate
- Displacement: 3,030 tons full load
- Length: 110.50 m (362.53 ft)
- Beam: 13.25 m (43.47 ft)
- Draught: 3.94 m (12.93 ft)
- Installed power: 4 MTU 20V 1163 diesel-engines, 30,000 hp (22,000 kW) CODAD
- Propulsion: 2 shaft, controllable pitch propellers
- Speed: 27 knots (50 km/h; 31 mph)
- Range: 4,000 nautical miles (7,000 km) at 20 knots (37 km/h)
- Complement: 180 (29 officers, 151 enlisted)
- Sensors & processing systems: Radar; TM 1126; AWS-6; HSA D08; HSA STIR 124; Sonar; SQS-56,
- Electronic warfare & decoys: ARES-2NC ESM, Mk 36 decoy
- Armament: 2 Mk 141 quad-pack Launcher for 8 × RGM-84 Harpoon; 1 MK 21 Guided Missile Launching System for 16 × RIM-7 Sea Sparrow; 1 × 5 inch /54 gun; 3 × Oerlikon Contraves Sea Zenith 25 mm CIWS gun systems; 2 × 3 12.75 in Mk.32 torpedo tubes in triple mountings
- Aviation facilities: Hangar and platform for; 1 × AB 212 ASW helicopter

TCG Fatih (F 242) is a Yavuz-class frigate of the Turkish Navy.

== Development and design ==
Yavuz-class frigates were designed in Germany and are part of the MEKO family of modular warships; in this case the MEKO 200 design. An order for ships was signed by the Turkish government in April 1983 for four MEKO frigates. Two ships were built in Germany and two in Turkey with German assistance. They are similar in design to the larger Barbaros-class frigates of the Turkish Navy, which are improved versions of the Yavuz-class frigate.

The Turkish Navy has an ongoing limited modernization project for an electronic warfare suite. The intent is to upgrade the ships with locally-produced ECM, ECCM systems, active decoys, LWRs, IRST, and the necessary user interface systems.

== Construction and career ==
Fatih was launched on 24 April 1987 by Gölcük Naval Shipyard in and commissioned on 12 October 1988.

On 25 August 2020, the Italian destroyer Luigi Durand de la Penne conducted a maritime exercise in the Eastern Mediterranean with TCG Fatih.
