= TCG Salihreis =

Barbaros-class frigate of the Turkish Navy

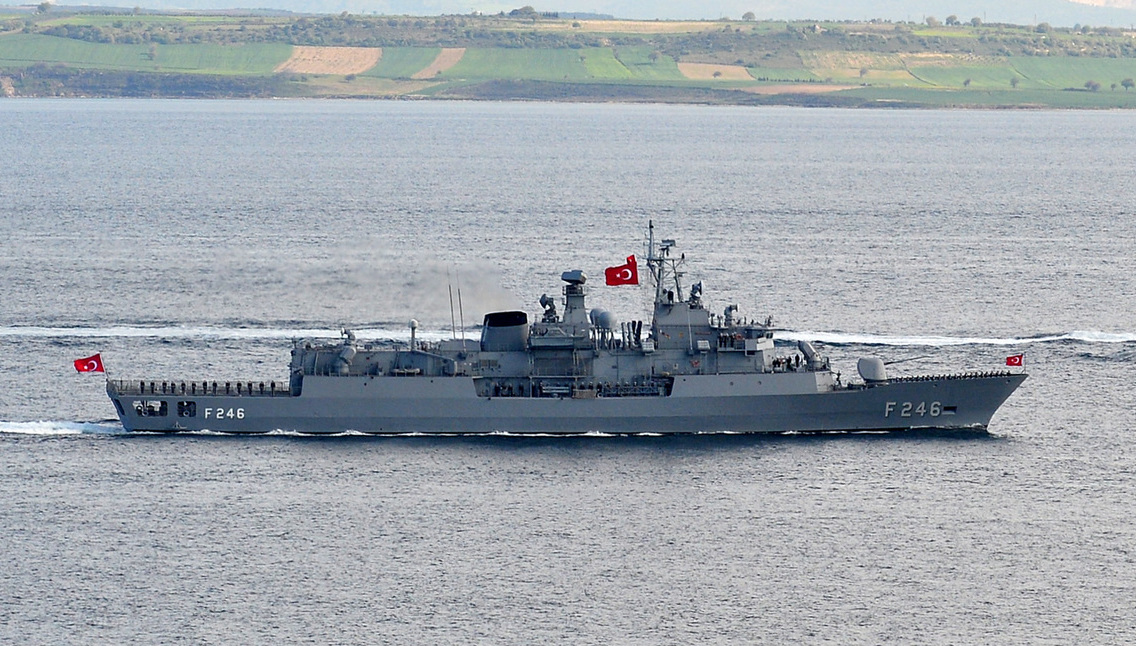
- TCG Salihreis underway in Çanakkale, 24 April 2015

History

Turkey
- Name: Salihreis
- Namesake: Salah Rais
- Builder: Blohm+Voss, Hamburg
- Launched: 26 September 1997
- Commissioned: 22 July 1998
- Identification: Pennant number: F 246
- Status: Active

General characteristics
- Class & type: Barbaros-class frigate
- Displacement: 3,100 tons standard; 3,350 tons full load
- Length: 118.0 metres (387.1 ft)
- Beam: 14.8 metres (49 ft)
- Draught: 4.25 metres (13.9 ft)
- Propulsion: 2 shaft CODOG, controllable pitch propellers , 2 General Electric LM-2500 gas turbines 60,000 hp; 2 MTU 20V 1163 diesel-engines, 13,060 hp (9,740 kW)
- Speed: 32 knots (59 km/h; 37 mph) on gas turbine; 22 knots (41 km/h; 25 mph) on diesel only
- Range: 4,100 nautical miles (7,600 km; 4,700 mi) at 18 knots (33 km/h; 21 mph)
- Complement: 24 officers, 156 enlisted men
- Sensors & processing systems: Radar; Thales SMART-S Mk2; Decca 2040 BT; HSA D08; HSA STIR -24, HSA STIR 18; Sonar; SQS-56
- Electronic warfare & decoys: Racal Cutlass, Racal Scorpion, Mk 36 decoy
- Armament: 1 × Mk 41 Mod 8 VLS for 32 × RIM-162 ESSM Sea Sparrow PDMS (SAM) or 8 Sea Sparrow PDMS(SAM); 2 × Mk 141 quad-pack Launcher for 8 × RGM-84 Harpoon; 1 × 5 inch /54 gun; 3 × Oerlikon Contraves Sea Zenith 25mm CIWS gun systems; 2 × Mark 32 Surface Vessel Torpedo Tube sets
- Aircraft carried: 1 × S-70B Seahawk or AB 212 ASW helicopters
- Aviation facilities: Hangar and platform

TCG Salihreis (F 246) is a Barbaros-class frigate of the Turkish Navy.

== Development and design ==
Barbaros-class frigates were designed in Germany and are part of the MEKO group of modular warships, in this case the MEKO 200 design. Two ships were built in Germany and two in Turkey with German assistance. They are larger than the previous Yavuz-class frigates and are also faster due to using CODOG machinery rather than pure diesels.

The first two vessels (F 244 and F 245) are defined as the Barbaros class (MEKO 200 TN Track II-A) while the last two vessels (F 246 and F 247) are defined as the Salih Reis class (MEKO 200 TN Track II-B) by the Turkish Navy.

Salih Reis subclass ships are built with 8-cell Mk. 41 VLS and longer than Barbaros class vessels to accommodate 16-cell Mk. 41 VLS upgrade in the future while Barbaros-class vessels built with Mk.29 Sea Sparrow launchers that planned to be replaced by 8-cell Mk. 41 VLS.

== Construction and career ==
Salihreis was launched on 26 September 1997 by Blohm+Voss in Hamburg and commissioned on 22 July 1998.

On 29 April 2020, Salihreis was sent to assist the Royal Canadian Navy in search for a missing helicopter from HMCS Fredericton.

She participated in the Operation Mediterranean Shield with NATO Naval Task Group-2, consisting of Spanish frigate Cristóbal Colón, Greek frigate Kountouriotis, and TCG Gaziantep, conducted Crossing Training (PASSEX) in the Eastern Mediterranean Sea on 12 February 2021.
