= TCG Kemalreis =

Barbaros-class frigate of the Turkish Navy

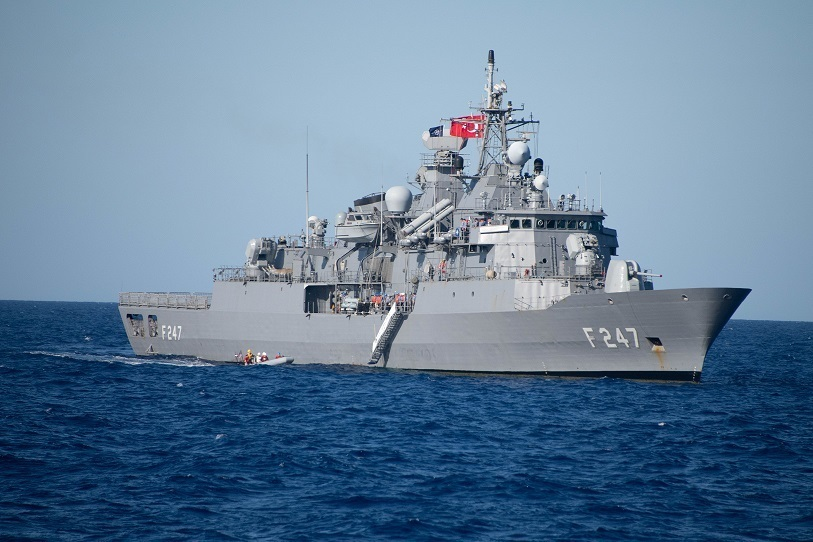
- TCG Kemalreis in July 2022

History

Turkey
- Name: Kemalreis
- Namesake: Kemal Reis, And Mustafa Kemal Ataturk
- Builder: Gölcük, Kocaeli
- Launched: 22 July 1998
- Commissioned: 8 June 2000
- Identification: Pennant number: F 247
- Nickname(s): Kemal Pasha
- Status: Active

General characteristics
- Class & type: Barbaros-class frigate
- Displacement: 3,100 tons standard; 3,350 tons full load
- Length: 118.0 metres (387.1 ft)
- Beam: 14.8 metres (49 ft)
- Draught: 4.25 metres (13.9 ft)
- Propulsion: 2 shaft CODOG, controllable pitch propellers , 2 General Electric LM-2500 gas turbines 60,000 hp; 2 MTU 20V 1163 diesel-engines, 13,060 hp (9,740 kW)
- Speed: 32 knots (59 km/h; 37 mph) on gas turbine; 22 knots (41 km/h; 25 mph) on diesel only
- Range: 4,100 nautical miles (7,600 km; 4,700 mi) at 18 knots (33 km/h; 21 mph)
- Complement: 24 officers, 156 enlisted men
- Sensors & processing systems: Radar; Thales SMART-S Mk2; Decca 2040 BT; HSA D08; HSA STIR -24, HSA STIR 18; Sonar; SQS-56
- Electronic warfare & decoys: Racal Cutlass, Racal Scorpion, Mk 36 decoy
- Armament: 1 × Mk 41 Mod 8 VLS for 32 × RIM-162 ESSM Sea Sparrow PDMS (SAM) or 8 Sea Sparrow PDMS(SAM); 2 × Mk 141 quad-pack Launcher for 8 × RGM-84 Harpoon; 1 × 5 inch /54 gun; 3 × Oerlikon Contraves Sea Zenith 25mm CIWS gun systems; 2 × Mark 32 Surface Vessel Torpedo Tube sets
- Aircraft carried: 1 × S-70B Seahawk or AB 212 ASW helicopters
- Aviation facilities: Hangar and platform

TCG Kemalreis (F 247) is a Barbaros-class frigate of the Turkish Navy.

== Development and design ==
Barbaros-class frigates were designed in Germany and are part of the MEKO group of modular warships, in this case the MEKO 200 design. Two ships were built in Germany and two in Turkey with German assistance. They are larger than the previous Yavuz-class frigates and are also faster due to using CODOG machinery rather than pure diesels.

The first two vessels (F 244 and F 245) are defined as the Barbaros class (MEKO 200 TN Track II-A) while the last two vessels (F 246 and F 247) are defined as the Salih Reis class (MEKO 200 TN Track II-B) by the Turkish Navy.

Salih Reis subclass ships are built with 8-cell Mk. 41 VLS and longer than Barbaros class vessels to accommodate 16-cell Mk. 41 VLS upgrade in the future while Barbaros-class vessels built with Mk.29 Sea Sparrow launchers that planned to be replaced by 8-cell Mk. 41 VLS.

== Construction and career ==
Kemalreis was launched on 22 July 1998 by Gölcük Naval Shipyard in Kocaeli and commissioned on 8 June 2000.

On 3 September 2022, Kemalreis became the first Turkish warship to dock in Israel after relations were fully restored between the two countries after a decade.
