= TCG Yıldırım (F 243) =

Barbaros-class frigate of the Turkish Navy

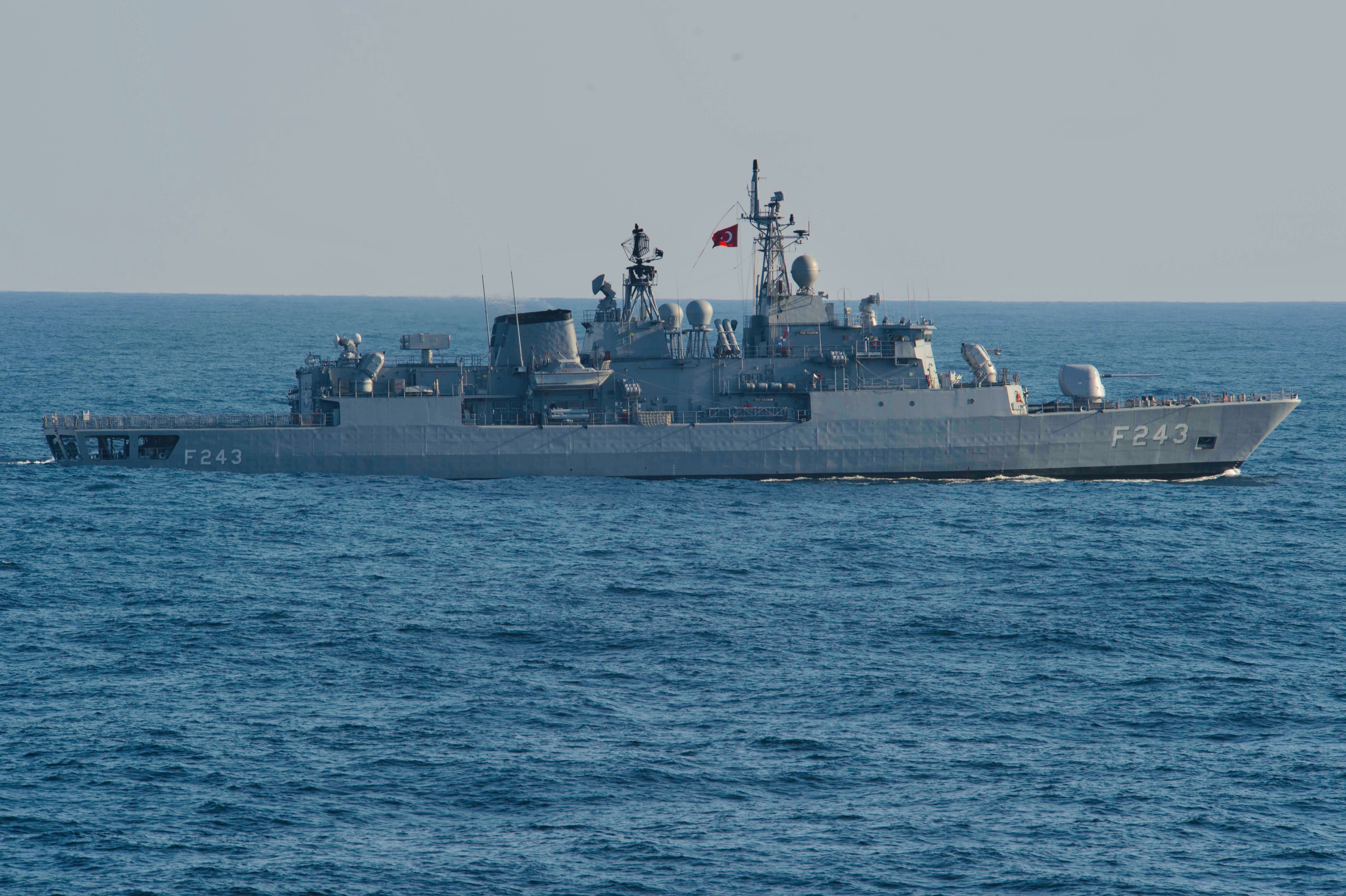
- TCG Yıldırım on 2 June 2014

History

Turkey
- Name: Yıldırım
- Namesake: Bayezid I
- Builder: Gölcük Naval Shipyard, Kocaeli, Turkey
- Launched: 22 July 1988
- Commissioned: 17 November 1989
- Identification: Pennant number: F 243
- Status: Active

General characteristics
- Class & type: Yavuz-class frigate
- Displacement: 3,030 tons full load
- Length: 110.50 m (362.53 ft)
- Beam: 13.25 m (43.47 ft)
- Draught: 3.94 m (12.93 ft)
- Installed power: 4 MTU 20V 1163 diesel-engines, 30,000 hp (22,000 kW) CODAD
- Propulsion: 2 shaft, controllable pitch propellers
- Speed: 27 knots (50 km/h; 31 mph)
- Range: 4,000 nautical miles (7,000 km) at 20 knots (37 km/h)
- Complement: 180 (29 officers, 151 enlisted)
- Sensors & processing systems: Radar; TM 1126; AWS-6; HSA D08; HSA STIR 124; Sonar; SQS-56,
- Electronic warfare & decoys: ARES-2NC ESM, Mk 36 decoy
- Armament: 2 Mk 141 quad-pack Launcher for 8 × RGM-84 Harpoon; 1 MK 21 Guided Missile Launching System for 16 × RIM-7 Sea Sparrow; 1 × 5 inch /54 gun; 3 × Oerlikon Contraves Sea Zenith 25 mm CIWS gun systems; 2 × 3 12.75 in Mk.32 torpedo tubes in triple mountings
- Aviation facilities: Hangar and platform for; 1 × AB 212 ASW helicopter

TCG Yıldırım (F 243) is a Yavuz-class frigate of the Turkish Navy.

== Development and design ==
Yavuz-class frigates were designed in Germany and are part of the MEKO family of modular warships; in this case the MEKO 200 design. An order for ships was signed by the Turkish government in April 1983 for four MEKO frigates. Two ships were built in Germany and two in Turkey with German assistance. They are similar in design to the larger Barbaros-class frigates of the Turkish Navy, which are improved versions of the Yavuz-class frigate.

The Turkish Navy has an ongoing limited modernization project for an electronic warfare suite. The intent is to upgrade the ships with locally-produced ECM, ECCM systems, active decoys, LWRs, IRST, and the necessary user interface systems.

== Construction and career ==
Yıldırım was launched on 22 July 1988 by Gölcük Naval Shipyard and commissioned on 17 November 1989.

Standing NATO Maritime Group Two (SNMG2), which consists of Álvaro de Bazán, Regina Maria, and TCG Yıldırım, participated in the multinational Exercise Sea Breeze 2020, between 20 and 24 July 2020.

On February 17 2021, Magdeburg, KRI Sultan Hasanuddin, and TCG Yıldırım conducted an exercise in the Mediterranean Sea.
