= Gölcük Naval Shipyard =

Naval shipyard of the Turkish Navy

Gölcük Naval Shipyard Gölcük Donanma Tersanesi
- Part of Gölcük Naval Base
- Gölcük, Kocaeli

Site information
- Type: Military facility
- Controlled by: Turkish Navy

Location
- Location of the Gölcük Naval Shipyard
- Coordinates: 40.723°N 29.803°E

Site history
- In use: 1926 - present

Garrison information
- Past commanders: Assoc. Prof. Dr. Eng. Rear Admiral Nurhan Kahyaoğlu

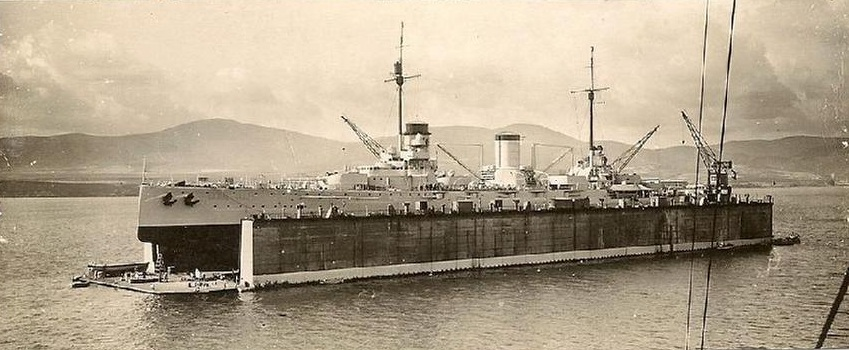
Turkish battlecruiser TCG Yavuz in the new floating drydock, c. 1928.

Gölcük Naval Shipyard (Turkish: Gölcük Donanma Tersanesi) is a naval shipyard of the Turkish Naval Forces within the Gölcük Naval Base on the southern shore of the Gulf of İzmit, in the eastern part of the Sea of Marmara, in Gölcük, Kocaeli. Established in 1926, the shipyard serves for the construction and maintenance of military vessels. A total of 3,221 personnel are employed at the shipyard, which stretches over an area of 255,526 m^{2} (2,750,460 sq ft), with covered structures of 121,466 m^{2} (1,307,450 sq ft).

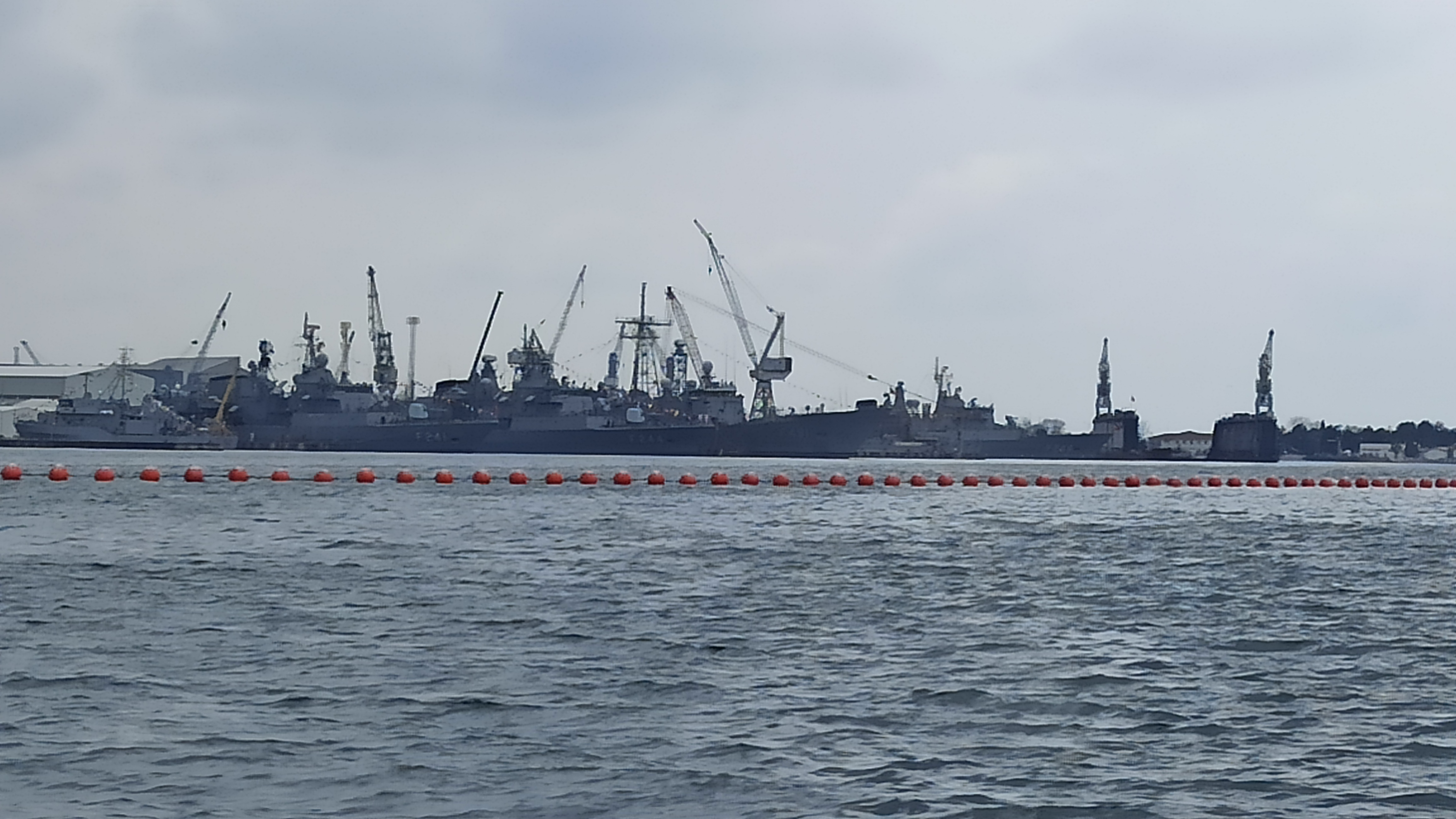
Gölcük Naval Shipyard

== History ==
To repair the war damages of the Turkish battlecruiser TCG Yavuz after World War I, a floating drydock, large enough to hold the big vessel, was needed. The site chosen was Gölcük on the southern shore of the Gulf of İzmit. With the construction of the floating drydock and the housing barracks by the German shipbuilding company Flender Werke, Gölcük Naval Shipyard was established in 1926.

The maintenance facilities were extended in 1942 with various other buildings, such as a machine plant and foundry, stretching over a big swampland, a small lake and hazelnut orchard fields in Gölcük. The original Convention on the Turkish Straits in 1923, part of the Treaty of Lausanne signed in 1923, banned military facilities along the coastline of the Turkish Straits. For this reason, the Turkish Navy's infrastructure, like shipyards and naval facilities at the Golden Horn and İstinye in Istanbul, were systematically relocated to Gölcük. Later, in 1936, the Montreux Convention Regarding the Regime of the Straits allowed Turkey to rebuild naval facilities along the Turkish Straits.

The principal development and enlargement of the shipyard started in 1947, especially after Turkey's NATO membership in 1952, within the framework of NATO planning and subsidies. Gölcük Naval Shipyard is today capable of building naval vessels like submarines, corvettes, frigates, landing ships and commercial vessels up to 30,000 DWT. It is the second-largest shipbuilding facility in Turkey after the Pendik Naval Shipyard in Tuzla, Istanbul.

== Milestones ==
Following the completion of the repair works of TCG Yavuz, the shipyard started the construction of the first ship entirely built in Gölcük. On July 26, 1934, an oil tanker was laid down. The 58.60 m (192.3 ft) long vessel was constructed in 16 months, named MT Gölcük after the shipyard, and launched on November 1, 1935, being also the first ship to be built in the Republican era. MT Gölcük served until 1983.

In 1980, an Ay class submarine with a displacement of 1,000 tons was constructed at the Gölcük Naval Shipyard, marking an important turning point in the Turkish shipbuilding history. Also, the construction of a modern frigate, the TCG Fatih (F-242) in 1988, increased the international prestige of the shipyard.

As of January 4, 2008, a total of 454 vessels were built at Gölcük Naval Shipyard.

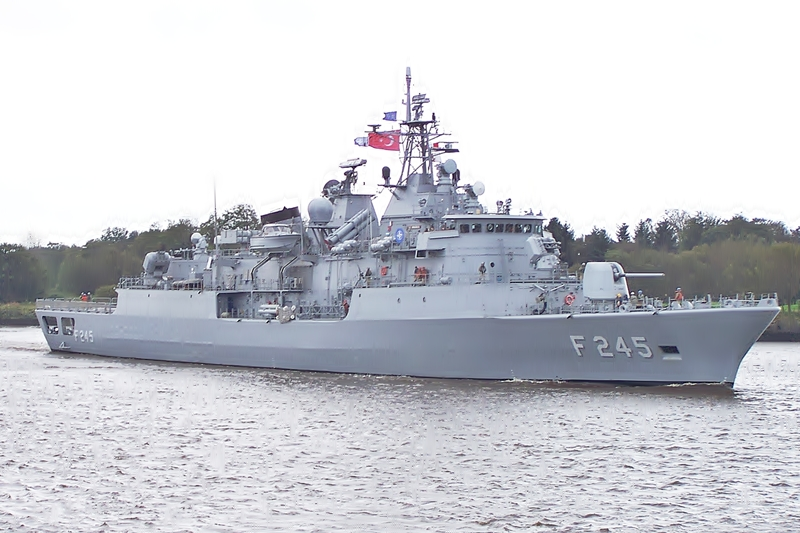
TCG Oruçreis (F-245), built at the Gölcük Naval Shipyard, navigates down the River Clyde towards the Firth of Clyde after a weekend in Glasgow, Scotland, before Exercise Joint Warrior 2011 (JW 11/2).

== Notable ships built ==
- Floating dock of 7,500 tons lifting capacity
- Akar class Logistics Support Vessel (Supertanker)
- Yavuz class frigates (MEKO 200 TN Track I)
  - TCG Fatih (F-242) launched April 24, 1987, commissioned October 12, 1988
  - TCG Yıldırım (F-243) launched July 22, 1988, commissioned November 17, 1989
- Barbaros class frigates (MEKO 200 TN II-A)
  - TCG Oruçreis (F-245) launched July 28, 1994, commissioned May 23, 1997
- Salih Reis class frigates (MEKO 200 TN II-B)
  - TCG Kemalreis (F-247) launched July 28, 1998, commissioned June 8, 2000
- Ay class submarines (Type 209/1200)
  - TCG Yıldıray (S 350) commissioned July 20, 1981
  - TCG Doğanay (S 351) commissioned November 16, 1984
  - TCG Dolunay (S 352) commissioned September 14, 1990
- Preveze class submarines (Type 209/T1.1400)
  - TCG Preveze (S 353) commissioned July 28, 1994
  - TCG Sakarya (S 354) commissioned December 21, 1995
  - TCG 18 Mart (S 355) commissioned June 29, 1998
  - TCG Anafartalar (S 356) commissioned October 12, 1998
- Gür class submarines (Type 209/T2.1400)
  - TCG Gür (S 357) commissioned July 24, 2003
  - TCG Çanakkale (S 358) commissioned December 13, 2004
  - TCG Burakreis (S 359) commissioned November 1, 2006
  - TCG Birinci İnönü (S 360) launched May 24, 2007, commissioned June 27, 2008
- Kılıç II-B class fast patrol boats
  - TCG Atak (P 337) launched in 2006, commissioned July 24, 2008
- Turkish Type 80 class coast guard boats
  - TCSG-3 Coast Guard Boat
  - TCSG-92 Coast Guard Fast Attack Boat
- Kaan class coast guard boats
  - MRTP-15, MRTP-29, MRTP-33

== Projects ==
- Coast guard search and rescue ship
- Enhanced fast patrol boats
- Fast patrol boats
- Landing Craft, Tank (LCT)
- Landing Ship, Tank (LST)
- Landing Platform Dock (LPD)
- A class Minehunters
- New type patrol boat
- Reis class (Type 214TN) AIP submarines
- Rescue and towing ship
- Milden National Submarine
- Submarine rescue mother ship (MOSHIP)

== See also ==
- Gölcük Naval Base, Gölcük, Kocaeli
- Pendik Naval Shipyard, Tuzla, Istanbul
