= Osprey HSY-56A-class gunboat =

Class of naval vessel

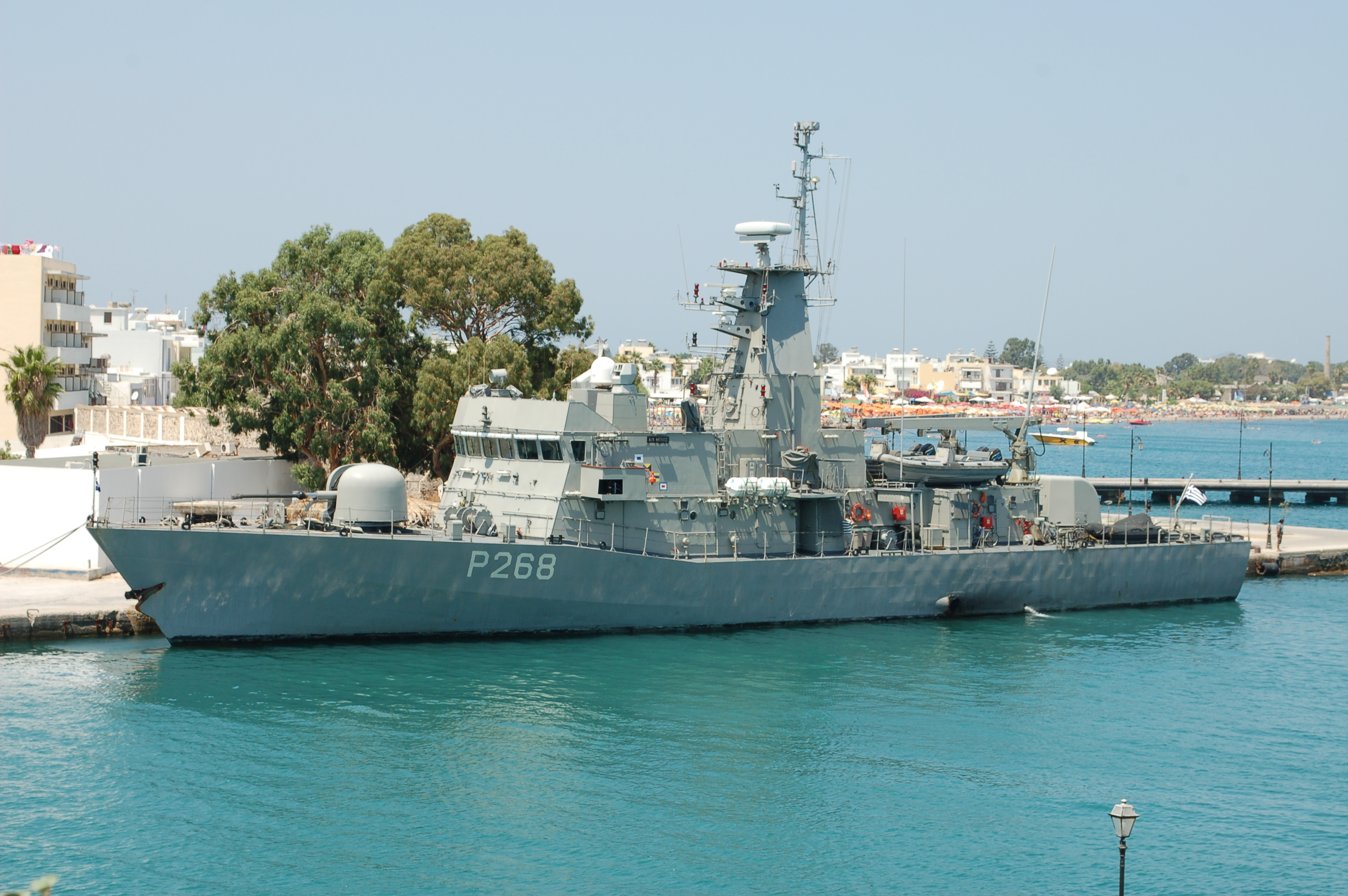
- Gunboat HS P-268 Aittitos of the type HSY-56A at the port of Kos in 2012

Class overview
- Name: HSY-56A
- Builders: Hellenic Shipyards
- Operators: Hellenic Navy
- Preceded by: HSY-56
- In commission: 2003–present
- Planned: 4
- Completed: 4
- Active: 4

General characteristics
- Type: Gunboat
- Displacement: 575 tons full load
- Length: 56 m (183 ft 9 in)
- Beam: 10 m (32 ft 10 in)
- Draught: 3.6 m (11 ft 10 in)
- Propulsion: 2 x Wärtsilä Nohab 16V25 diesels; 10,000 hp(m) sustained; 2 shafts
- Speed: 22–23 knots (41–43 km/h; 25–26 mph)
- Range: 2,500 nmi (4,600 km; 2,900 mi) at 15 knots (28 km/h; 17 mph)
- Troops: 21
- Complement: 50
- Sensors & processing systems: Thales Variant two-dimensional (2D) multipurpose short-medium range surveillance radar; Thales Mirador electro-optical target tracker; Thales Scout MkII LPI navigation radar; Sperry Marine Bridgemaster-E navigation radar; Raymarine RL80C MARPA secondary navigation radar; Thales LIROD Mk2 fire control tracking system; ICMS Tacticos; Aeromaritime IFF Mk12; ICS 2000 integrated communications system
- Electronic warfare & decoys: DR 3000 ESM system; 1 x MK36 SRBOC decoy launcher
- Armament: 1 x Oto Melara 76 mm/62 cal. gun; 85 rounds/min to 16 km (8.6 NM) anti-surface; 12 km (6.6 NM) anti-aircraft; 1 x Bofors 40 mm/70 gun; 2 x Rheinmetall Rh202 20 mm guns; FIM-92 Stinger portable personal missile launchers

The Osprey HSY-56A-class gunboat (also known as Machitis-class gunboat) is a class of naval vessel currently in service in the Hellenic Navy. These ships are similar to HSY-55-class gunboat and were also built by Hellenic Shipyards (HSY). They are the most modern patrol vessels of Hellenic Navy. The first ship of the class, named Machitis (pronounced "Makhitis"), was commissioned on 29 October 2003. As of 2025, all of the four ships of the class are in active service.

== Incidents at sea ==
On 17 January 2018, the second ship of the class, Nikiforos, was bumped by a Turkish Coast Guard patrol boat while patrolling in the Aegean Sea, close to the Imia islets. The Turkish patrol boat was conducting dangerous manoeuvres which caused a slight collision of the two vessels. Turkish media reported the incident as well but without highlighting the bumping of the Greek ship.

== Ships ==
Ship	Builder	Commissioned	Status
P266 Machitis Μαχητής	Hellenic Shipyards S.A.	October 29, 2003	In active service (2025)
P267 Nikiforos Νικηφόρος	Hellenic Shipyards S.A.	March 30, 2004	In active service (2025)
P268 Aittitos Αήττητος	Hellenic Shipyards S.A.	August 5, 2004	In active service (2025)
P269 Krataios Κραταιός	Hellenic Shipyards S.A.	October 20, 2005	In active service (2025)

== Gallery ==
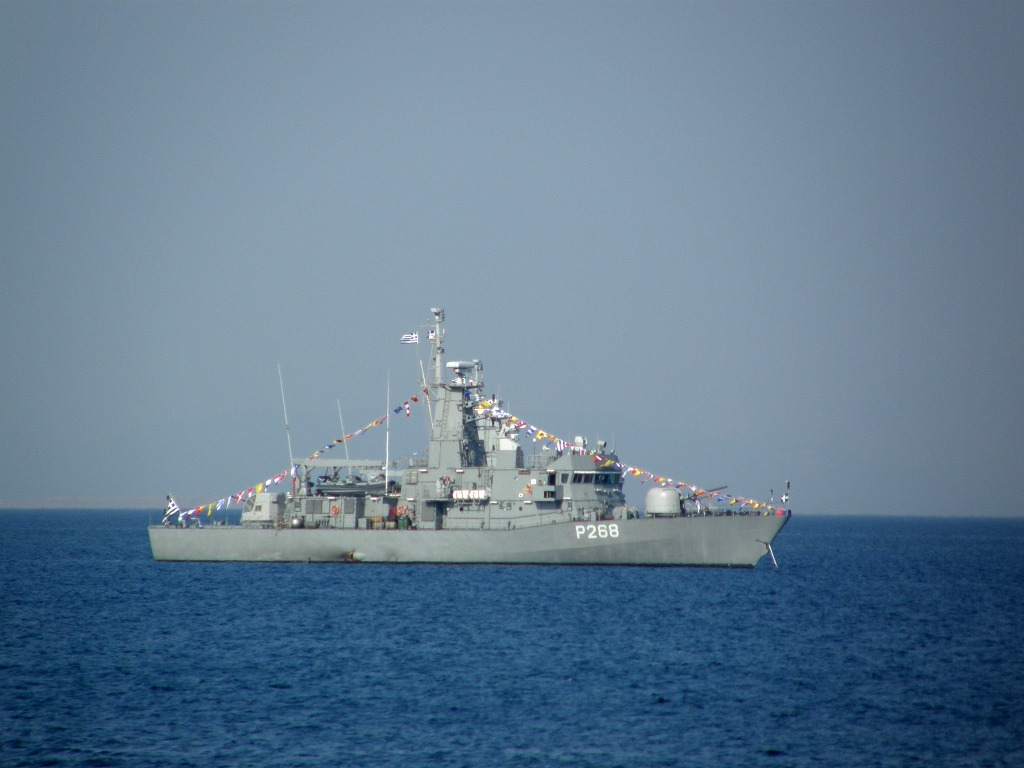
P 268 Aittitos at Faliron Bay (2008)

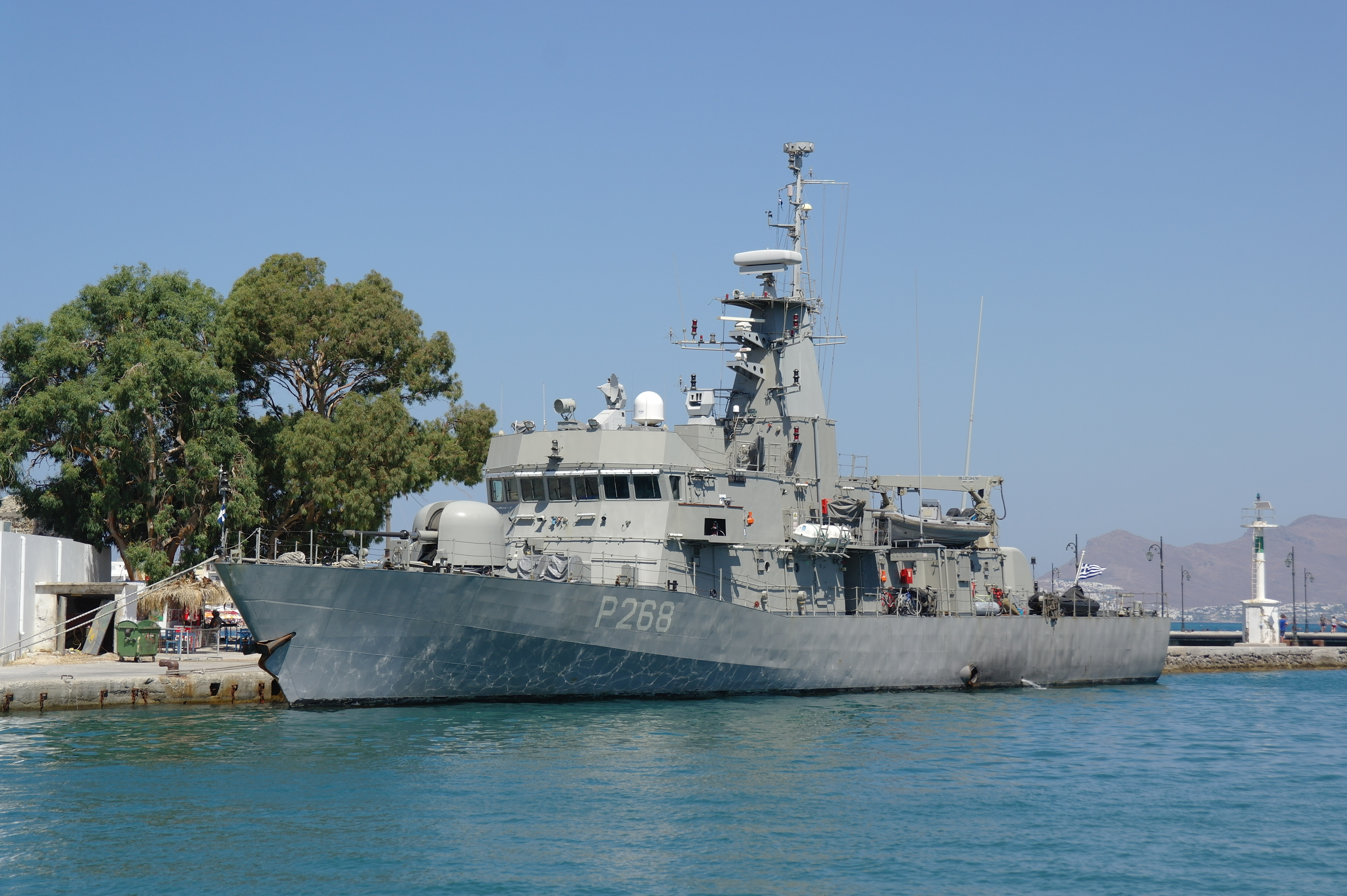
P 268 Aittitos at the port of Kos (2012)
