= Barbaros-class frigate =

Turkish Navy warships

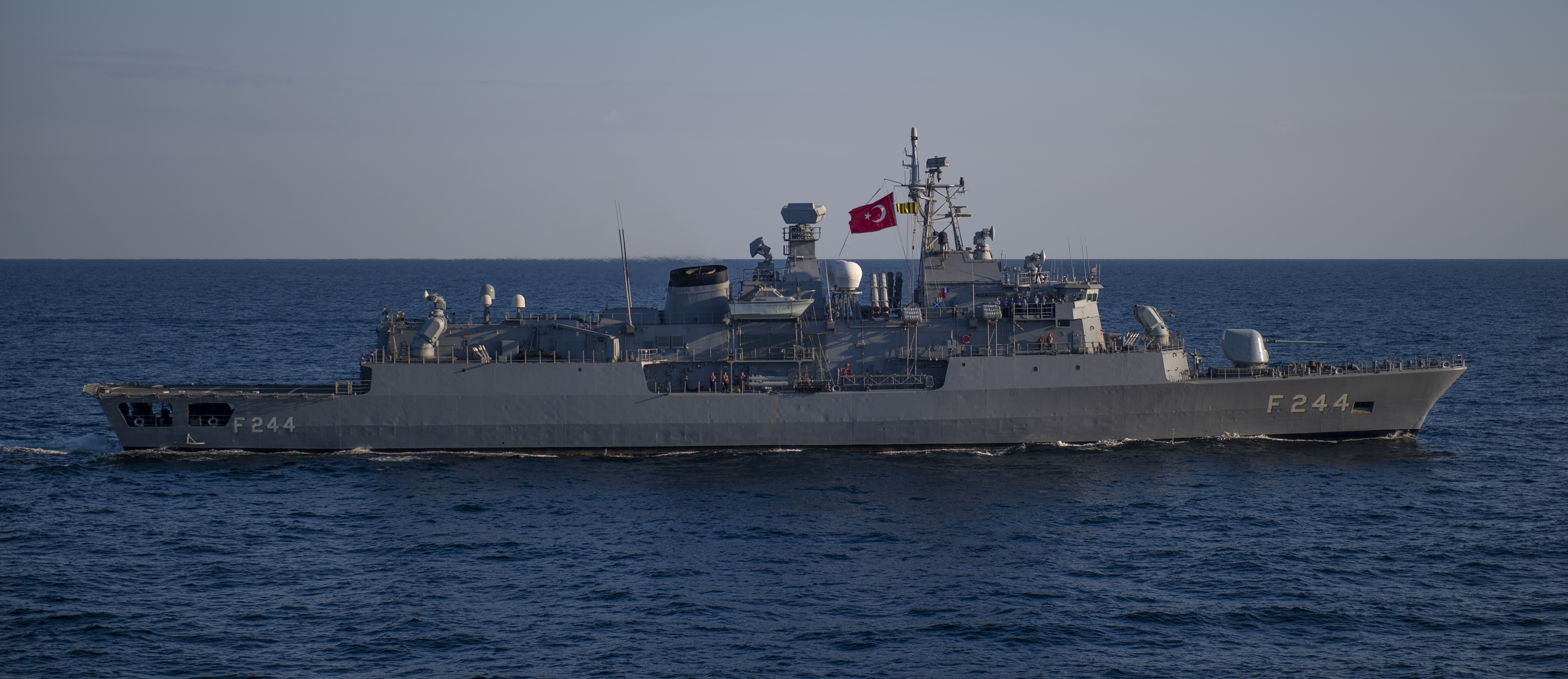
- TCG Barbaros (F-244) on 1 October 2020.

Class overview
- Name: Barbaros, MEKO 200 TN-II
- Builders: Blohm + Voss; Gölcük Naval Shipyard
- Operators: Turkish Navy
- Preceded by: Yavuz class
- Succeeded by: Istanbul class
- Subclasses: Salih Reis class
- In commission: 1997–present
- Completed: 4
- Active: 4

General characteristics
- Type: Frigate
- Displacement: 3,100 tons standard; 3,350 tons full load
- Length: 116.7 metres (383 ft) (F244, F245); 118.0 metres (387.1 ft) (F246, F247)
- Beam: 14.8 metres (49 ft)
- Draught: 4.25 metres (13.9 ft)
- Propulsion: 2 shaft CODOG, controllable pitch propellers , 2 General Electric LM-2500 gas turbines 60,000 hp; 2 MTU 20V 1163 diesel-engines, 13,060 hp (9,740 kW)
- Speed: 32 knots (59 km/h; 37 mph) on gas turbine; 22 knots (41 km/h; 25 mph) on diesel only
- Range: 4,100 nautical miles (7,600 km; 4,700 mi) at 18 knots (33 km/h; 21 mph)
- Complement: 24 officers, 156 enlisted men
- Sensors & processing systems: Radars; Thales SMART-S Mk2; Decca 2040 BT; HSA D08; HSA STIR -24, HSA STIR 18; Sonar; SQS-56; Mid-life upgrade(MLU); Radars; SMART-S Mk2 3BAR IIF-Mod 5 3D PESA search radar; MAR-D 3D AESA search radar; AKREP Dual Band Fire control radar; AKR-D Fire control radar; Systems; ADVENT Combat Management System; TUMSIS X SATCOM; TUMSIS X-Band Satellite Communication Terminals; KULAÇ Sounder System; KIRLANGIÇ Electro-Optical Director(EOD); G-LIS Enhanced Laser Warning System; PIRI-KATS Infrared Search and Tracking System (IRST); National Gun Fire Control System; ASELSAN V-UHF and HF Communication Antennas; MARTI 200-N Electro-Optical Reconnaissance and Surveillance System; Sonar; Armelsan ARAS-2023 Diver Detection Sonar; FERSAH Active/Passive Hull Mounted Sonar System
- Electronic warfare & decoys: Electronic warfare; Racal Cutlass, Racal Scorpion, Mk 36 decoy; MLU-Electronic warfare; ARES-2N(V)2 Electronic defence system; AREAS-2NC Electronic attack system; ASELSAN HIZIR Torpedo Jamming and Deception System
- Armament: Barbaros (F 244), Oruçreis (F 245): 1 × Mk 41 Mod 8 VLS for 32 × RIM-162 ESSM Sea Sparrow PDMS (SAM) or 8 Sea Sparrow PDMS(SAM); Salihreis (F 246), Kemalreis (F 247): 2 × Mk 41 Mod 8 VLS for 64 × RIM-162 ESSM Sea Sparrow PDMS (SAM) or 16 Sea Sparrow PDMS(SAM); Common: 2 × Mk 141 quad-pack Launcher for 8 × RGM-84 Harpoon; 1 × 5 inch /54 gun; 3 × Oerlikon Contraves Sea Zenith 25mm CIWS gun systems; 2 × Mark 32 Surface Vessel Torpedo Tube sets; Mid-life upgrade(MLU) Armament; Guns; 1 x 127mm (5/54) Mk45 Mode 2 main gun; 3 x ASELSAN 25mm STOP RCWS; Surface-to-surface missiles; 2 x 8 cells with 8 or 16 x ATMACA anti-ship missiles; Close in weapon systems; 1 x 35mm GÖKDENİZ CIWS; 1 x Phalanx Mk-15 Blok 1B Baseline 2 CIWS; Surface-to-air-missiles; 8 cells quadpack Mark 41 VLS with 32/64 ESSM Blok 1 missiles
- Aircraft carried: 1 × S-70B Seahawk or AB 212 ASW helicopters
- Aviation facilities: Hangar and platform

The Barbaros-class frigates are a group of four frigates in the Turkish Navy. They were designed in Germany and are part of the MEKO group of modular warships, in this case the MEKO 200 design. Two ships were built in Germany and two in Turkey with German assistance. They are larger than the previous Yavuz-class frigates and are also faster due to using CODOG machinery rather than pure diesels.

The first two vessels (F 244 and F 245) are defined as the Barbaros class (MEKO 200 TN Track II-A) while the last two vessels (F 246 and F 247) are defined as the Salih Reis class (MEKO 200 TN Track II-B) by the Turkish Navy.

Salih Reis subclass ships are built with 8-cell Mk. 41 VLS and are longer than Barbaros class vessels to accommodate 16-cell Mk. 41 VLS upgrade in the future. The Barbaros-class vessels built with Mk.29 Sea Sparrow launchers are planned to be replaced by 8-cell Mk. 41 VLS.

== Modernization projects ==
Barbaros-class vessels (F 244, F 245) have received an 8-cell Mk41 vertical launcher system (VLS) module, which replaced the obsolete Mk.29 Sea Sparrow launcher, while Salihreis-class vessels (F 246, F 247) have received a second 8-cell Mk 41 VLS module which brings the total number of cells to 16. Additionally the old DA-08 air search radars in all 4 vessels has been replaced by modern Thales SMART-S Mk2 3D radars.

On 3 April 2018 a contract was signed between ASELSAN–HAVELSAN Joint Venture and the secretariat for Defense Industry (SSM) regarding the Barbaros Class Frigate mid-life upgrade project. Project includes a heavy upgrade which including new weapons systems, a new combat management system, new radars and sensors, replacing current mast with an integrated mast and various upgrades. All 4 ships are included in this project. Expected finish year for project is 2025.

The mid-life modernization program projects to replace the radars and sonars, enhance EW capabilities, double the number of anti-ship missiles that the vessel is equipped with while also replacing it by locally designed and produced Atmaca anti-ship missiles, substitution of the Oerlikon Sea Zenith CIWS systems with 1 Phalanx and 1 Aselsan Gokdeniz CIWS, change the existing TACTICOS combat management system with Havelsan "B-SYS Combat Management System" and adopt a 127mm main gun to the frigates. Finally against asymmetric threats that the vessels may face 2x2 L/UMTAS launchers are planned to be integrated to the frigates.

== Ships of the class ==
Ship	Namesake	Builder	Launched	Commissioned
Barbaros class
TCG Barbaros (F 244)	Hayreddin Barbarossa	Blohm & Voss, Hamburg	29 September 1993	23 May 1997
TCG Oruçreis (F 245)	Oruç Reis	Gölcük Naval Shipyard, Kocaeli	28 July 1994	23 May 1997
Salihreis subclass
TCG Salihreis (F 246)	Salih Reis	Blohm & Voss, Hamburg	26 September 1997	22 July 1998
TCG Kemalreis (F 247)	Kemal Reis	Gölcük Naval Shipyard, Kocaeli	22 July 1998	8 June 2000

== See also ==
- List of frigate classes in service

Equivalent frigates of the same era

- Brahmaputra class
- Hydra class
- Type 053H3
- La Fayette class
- Lekiu class
