= Sea Zenith =

Automatic gun used by the Turkish Navy

Sea Zenith is a four-barrelled 25 mm CIWS It was developed in the 1980s by Oerlikon Contraves (Rheinmetall Air Defence since 2009) around their Oerlikon KBB gun and manufactured in Switzerland. Before 1989 it was known as the Sea Guard. This automatic gun uses a 25x184mm cartridge (longer than the one used by the more common Oerlikon KBA gun) at a rate of 800 rounds a minute. Using four independent guns instead of one multi-barrelled rotary cannon improves reliability. The system is mounted in an enclosed automatic turret and directed by the Seaguard radar developed by Contraves. The turret is tilted back to allow a higher elevation to intercept diving missiles. The system's primary purpose is defence against anti-ship missiles, and other precision guided weapons. However it can also be employed against fixed/rotary wing aircraft, ships and other small craft, coastal targets, and floating mines.

Specifications:

- Caliber: 25 mm
- Barrels: 4 (independent)
- Rate of fire: 3,200 rpm (combined)
- Range: 2 km
- Weight: 3500 kg

== Operations ==
The Turkish Naval Forces installed Sea Zenith on their MEKO 200 frigates, like the Barbaros and Yavuz classes. New Turkish made Aselsan Gökdeniz CIWS took the role of the gun-based CIWS in new and modernized ships of the Turkish Naval Forces.

It was also evaluated by the Italian Navy.

== Gallery ==
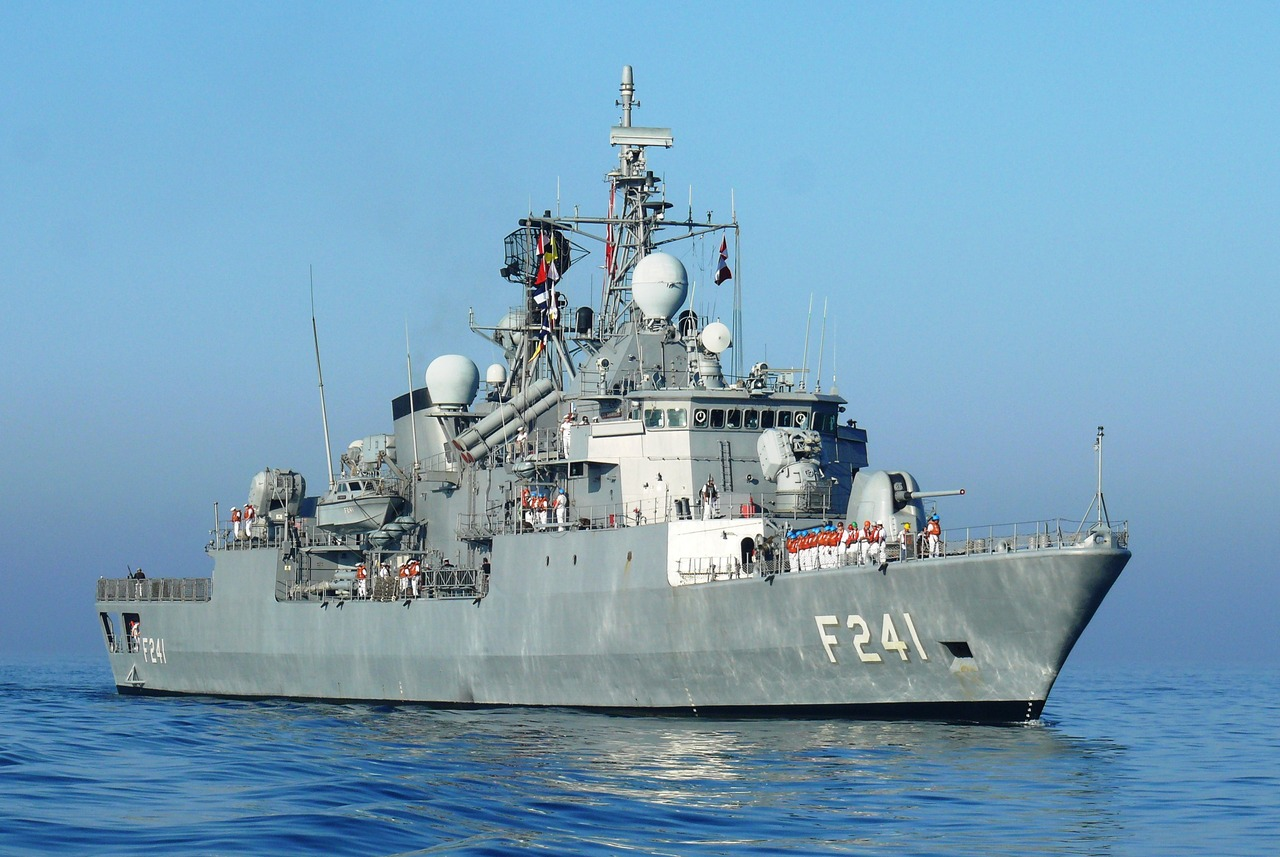
TCG Turgutreis bearing Sea Zenith

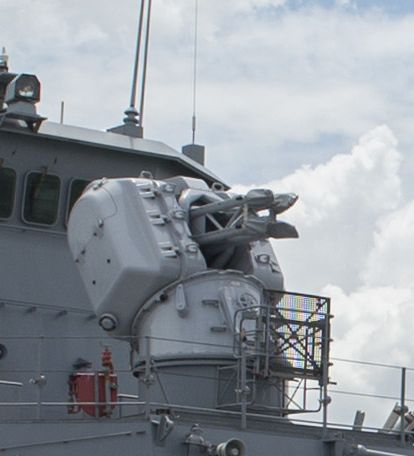
Sea Zenith on Turgutreis

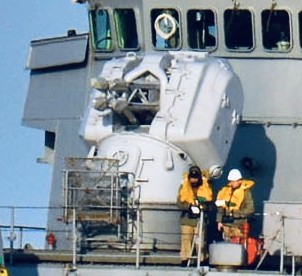
Another view of Sea Zenith on Turgutreis
