= List of major surface ships of the Turkish Navy =

This is a list of Turkish Navy major surface ships that have served past and present, from 10 July 1920 to present.

== Battleship ==
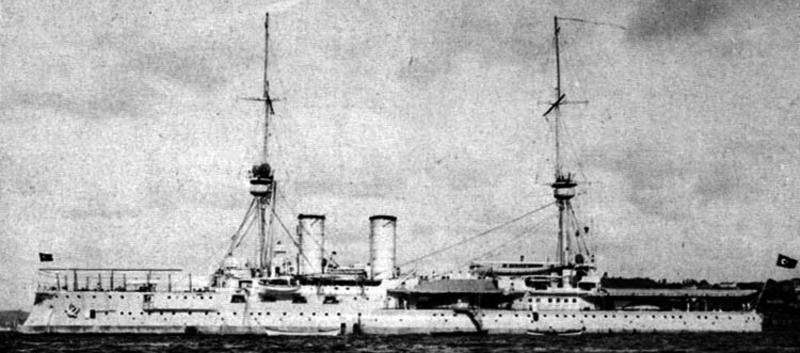
Turkish battleship Turgut Reis

=== Brandenburg-class ===
Name	Builder	Launched	Acquired	Fate
Barbaros Hayrettin	(German Empire) Kaiserliche Werft Wilhelmshaven, Wilhelmshaven	30 June 1891 SMS Kurfürst Friedrich Wilhelm	12 September 1910 Barbaros Hayreddin	Sunk by the British submarine HMS-E11 in Sea of Marmara, 8 August 1915
Turgut Reis	(German Empire) AG Vulcan, Stettin	14 December 1891; SMS Weissenburg	12 Septemter 1910; Turgut Reis	Stationary training ship at Gölcük post-1925; decommissioned 1933 & used as a barracks ship; broken-up 1950-57

== Battlecruiser ==
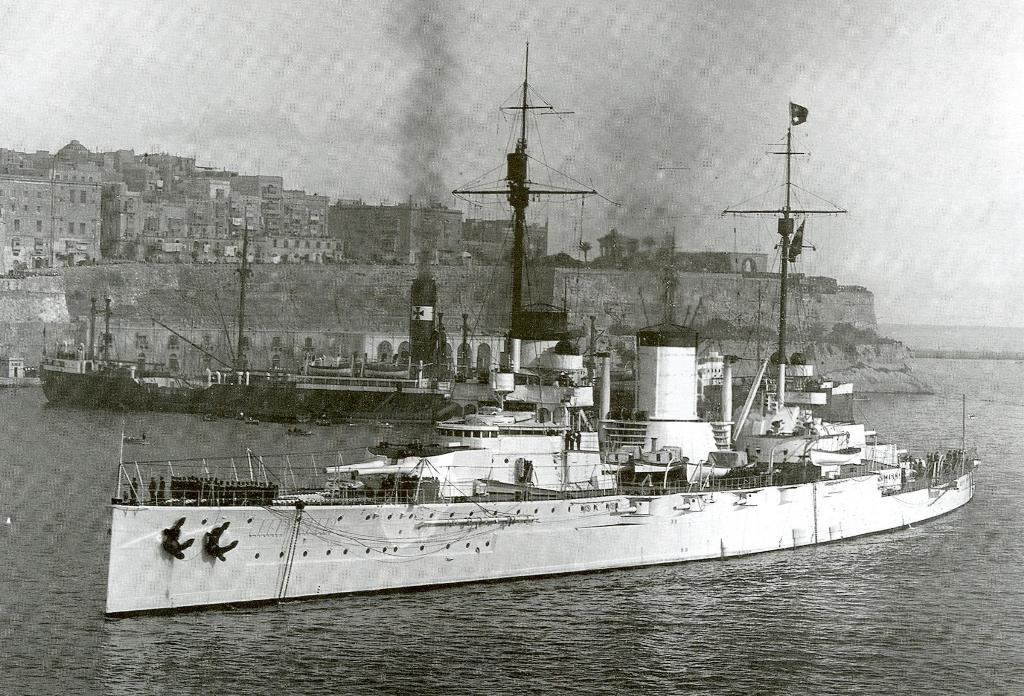
Turkish battlecruiser Yavuz, 1936.

=== Moltke class ===
Name	Builder	Launched	Acquired	Fate
Yavuz Sultan Selim	(German Empire) Blohm & Voss AG, Hamburg	28 March 1911; SMS Goeben	16 August 1914; Yavuz Sultan Selim	1930 Yavuz Sultan; 1936 Yavuz; Decommissioned 20 December 1950; Stricken 14 November 1954; stationary headquarters of Battle Fleet Command & Mine Fleet Command thru 1960; Sold & eventually scrapped July 1973-February 1976

=== Protected cruisers ===
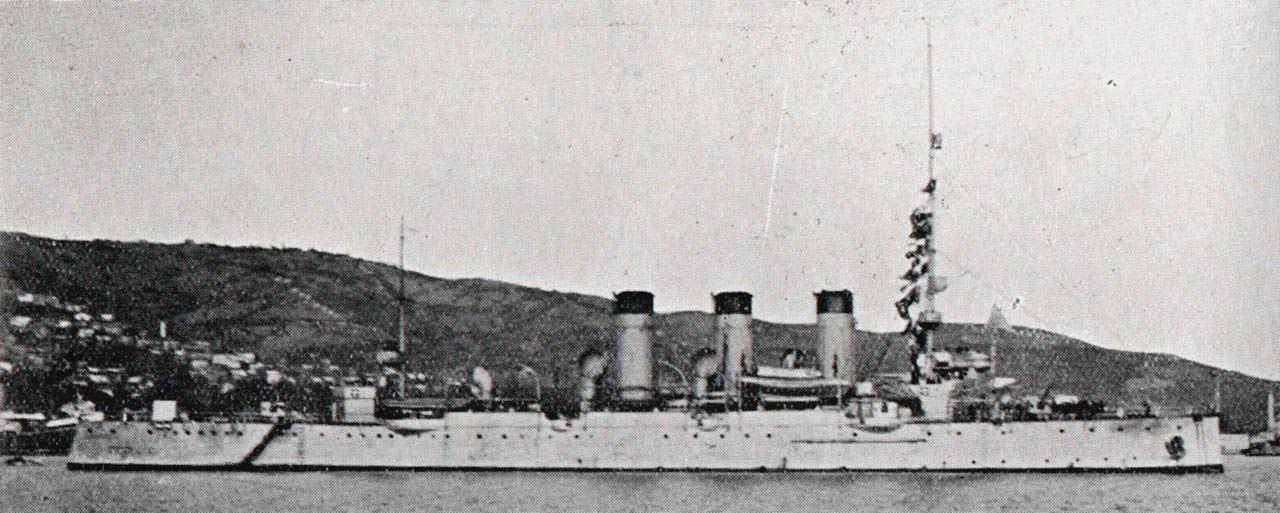
Turkish protected cruiser Mecidiye, 1932.

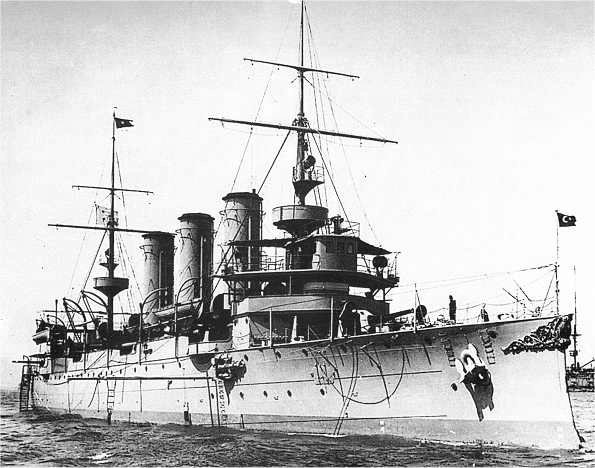
Turkish cruiser Hamidiye, 1914.

==== Mecidiye ====
Name	Builder	Launched	Commissioned	Fate
Mecidiye	William Cramp & Sons, Philadelphia	25 July 1903	19 December 1903; Mecidiye	Struck mine & sank near Odessa 3 April 1915; Salvaged by Russia 8 June 1915 & joined Russian Navy (Prut) 29 October 1915; Captured by Germans 1 May 1918; Returned Ottoman Navy 13 May 1918; Used as cadet training ship 1940-47; Decommissioned 1 March 1947; Sold & scrapped 1952-1956

==== Hamidiye ====
Name	Builder	Launched	Commissioned	Fate
Hamidiye	Sir W G Armstrong Whitworth & Co Ltd., Newcastle	25 September 1903	April 1904; Abdül Hamid	Hamidiye after July 1908; British control 1918–25, then ceded to Turkey; Used for cadet training 1940-47; Decommissioned March 1947; museum ship 1949-51; Sold & scrapped 10 September 1964-66

=== Torpedo cruisers ===
==== Peyk-i Şevket class ====
Name	Builder	Launched	Commissioned	Fate
Peyk-i Şevket	(German Empire) Schiffs & Maschinenbau Germania AG, Kiel	15 November 1906	November 1907; Peyk-i Şevket	Decommissioned 30 October 1918; Renamed Peyk 1923 & re-commissioned 1927; Stricken 1944; Broken-up 1953–54
Berk-i Satvet	(German Empire) Schiffs & Maschinenbau Germania AG, Kiel	1 December 1906	November 1907; Berk-i Satvet	Renamed Berk 1923; Stricken 1944; Broken-up 1953–55

== Destroyers ==
=== Samsun class ===
(Version of (France) French Navy Durandal-class destroyer):

Name	Builder	Launched	Commissioned	Fate
Samsun	(France) SA Chantier et Ateliers de la Gironde, Bordeaux	1907	3 September 1907	Decommissioned 1932; Scrapped 1949
Taşoz	(France) Schneider-Creusot, Nantes	1907	1907	Decommissioned 1932; Scrapped 1949
Basra	(France) SA Chantier et Ateliers de la Gironde, Bordeaux	1907	3 September 1907	Decommissioned 1932; Scrapped 1949

=== Muâvenet-i Millîye class ===
(Ex- Kaiserliche Marine S-165 class):

Name	Builder	Launched	Commissioned	Fate
Muâvenet-i Millîye	Fr Schichau AG, Elbing	20 March 1909; Ex-S-165	17 August 1910	Decommissioned October 1918; Discarded 1924 & used as accommodation hulk; Scrapped 1953
Nümûne-i Hamiyet	Fr Schichau AG, Elbing	3 July 1909; Ex-S-167	17 August 1910	Decommissioned October 1918 & used as storage hulk; Broken-up 1953

=== Adatepe class ===
(Version of (Kingdom of Italy) Regia Marina Folgore class):

Name	Builder	Launched	Commissioned	Fate
TCG Kocatepe	(Kingdom of Italy) Ansaldo, Sestri Ponente	7 February 1931	18 October 1931	Decommissioned February 1954; Scrapped
TCG Adatepe	(Kingdom of Italy) Ansaldo, Sestri Ponente	19 March 1931	18 October 1931	Decommissioned February 1954; Scrapped

=== Tinaztepe class ===
(Version of (Kingdom of Italy) Regia Marina Freccia class):

Ship	Builder	Launched	Commissioned	Fate
TCG Tınaztepe	(Kingdom of Italy) C.T. Riva Trigoso, Riva Trigoso	27 July 1931	6 June 1932	Decommissioned February 1954; Scrapped
TCG Zafer	(Kingdom of Italy) C.T. Riva Trigoso, Riva Trigoso	20 September 1931	6 June 1932	Decommissioned February 1954; Scrapped

=== Gayret ===
(Ex- Royal Navy O-class destroyer:

Name	Builder	Launched	Acquired	Fate
TCG Gayret	(United Kingdom) Fairfield, Govan	14 January 1941; Ex- Royal Navy HMS Oribi (G66)	18 June 1946	Used as a headquarters ship; Scrapped 1965

=== Demirhisar-class destroyer ===
(Modified Royal Navy I class):

Name	Builder	Launched	Acquired	Fate
TCG Demirhisar	(United Kingdom) Denny, Dumbarton	28 January 1941	1942	Decommissioned 1960
TCG Sultanhisar	(United Kingdom) Denny, Dumbarton	17 December 1940	1942	Decommissioned 1960
TCG Muavenet	(United Kingdom) Vickers, Barrow-in-Furness	24 February 1941	Taken over by Royal Navy on completion as HMS Inconstant (H49): Returned to Turkey on 9 March 1946	Scrapped 1960
TCG Gayret	(United Kingdom) Vickers, Barrow-in-Furness	15 December 1940	Taken over by Royal Navy on completion as HMS Ithuriel (H05): Constructive total loss 1943 after being damaged beyond repair by enemy aircraft, 28 November 1942	Sold for scrapping August 1944; United Kingdom gave HMS Oribi (G66) to Turkey instead of HMS Ithuriel (H05)

=== Ex-Gleaves class (US Navy) ===
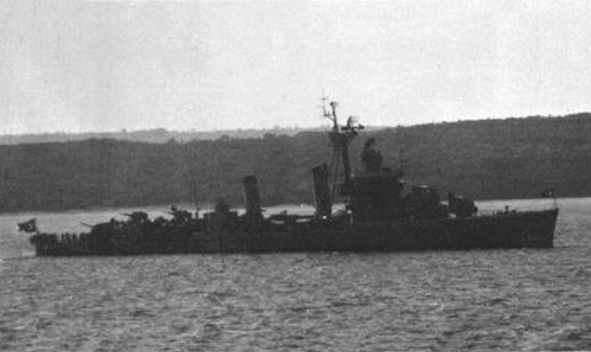
TCG Giresun (D-345), 1971

Name	Builder	Launched	Acquired	Fate
TCG Gaziantep (D-344)	(United States) Federal, Kearny	20 February 1942 as Ex-USS Lansdowne (DD-486)	10 June 1949	Scrapped 1973
TCG Giresun (D-345)	(United States) Federal, Kearny	20 March 1942 as Ex-USS McCalla (DD-488)	29 April 1949	Scrapped 1973
TCG Gelibolu (D-346)	(United States) Federal, Kearny	22 November 1941 as Ex-USS Buchanan (DD-484)	28 April 1949	Scrapped 1976
TCG Gemlik (D-347)	(United States) Federal, Kearny	20 March 1942 as Ex-USS Lardner (DD-487)	10 June 1949	Stricken 1974; Sunk as a target 21 November 1982 in Eastern Mediterranean

=== Ex-M-class ===
(Ex- Royal Navy M-class destroyer):

Name	Builder	Launched	Acquired	Fate
TCG Alp Alslan (D-348)	(United Kingdom) Scotts, Greenock	30 December 1941 as Ex- Royal Navy HMS Milne (G14)	29 June 1959	Discarded 1970
TCG Mareşal Fevzi Çakmak (D-349)	(United Kingdom) Vickers-Armstrongs, Tyne	30 October 1940 as Ex- Royal Navy HMS Marne (G35)	29 June 1959	Scrapped 1970
TCG Kılıç Ali Paşa (D-350)	(United Kingdom) Stephen, Linthouse	4 September 1941 as Ex- Royal Navy HMS Matchless (G52)	29 June 1959	Scrapped 1971
TCG Piyale Paşa (D-351)	(United Kingdom) Stephen, Linthouse	3 November 1941 as Ex- Royal Navy HMS Meteor (G73)	29 June 1959	Discarded 1979?

=== Ex-Fletcher-class destroyer (US Navy) ===
(Ex- (United States) US Navy Fletcher-class destroyer:)

Name	Builder	Launched	Acquired	Fate
TCG İstanbul (D-340)	(United States) Federal, Kearny, NJ	18 April 1943 as Ex-USS Clarence K. Bronson (DD-668)	14 January 1967	Scrapped 1987
TCG İzmir (D-341)	(United States) Gulf, Chickasaw, AL	19 December 1943 as Ex-USS Van Valkenburgh (DD-656)	28 February 1967 on loan from USA; 15 February 1973 sold to Turkey	Scrapped 1987
TCG İzmit (D-342)	(United States) Bath Iron Works, Bath, ME	5 June 1943 as Ex-USS Cogswell (DD-651)	1 October 1969	Scrapped 1981
TCG İskenderun (D-343)	(United States) Bethlehem, San Pedro, CA	29 October 1942 as Ex-USS Boyd (DD-544)	1 October 1969	Scrapped 1981
TCG İçel (D-34)	(United States) Bethlehem, San Pedro, CA	12 December 1943 as Ex-USS Preston (DD-795)	15 November 1969	Scrapped 1981

=== Ex-Allen M. Sumner-class destroyer (US Navy) ===
Ex- (United States) US Navy Robert H. Smith class (Allen M. Sumner class):

Name	Builder	Launched	Acquired	Fate
TCG Zafer (D-356)	(United States) Federal Shipbuilding and Dry Dock Company, San Pedro, CA	17 December 1944 as Ex-USS Hugh Purvis (DD-709)	1 July 1972	Stricken & returned to USA 1993; Scrapped 1994
TCG Muavenet (DM-357)	(United States) Bethlehem Shipbuilding, San Pedro, CA	9 April 1944 as Ex-USS Gwin (DD-772) -> USS Gwin (DM-33)	15 August 1971	Damaged during NATO exercise on 2 October 1992; Stricken & scrapped 1993

=== Gearing-class destroyer (US Navy) ===
(Ex- (United States) US Navy Gearing-class destroyer:)

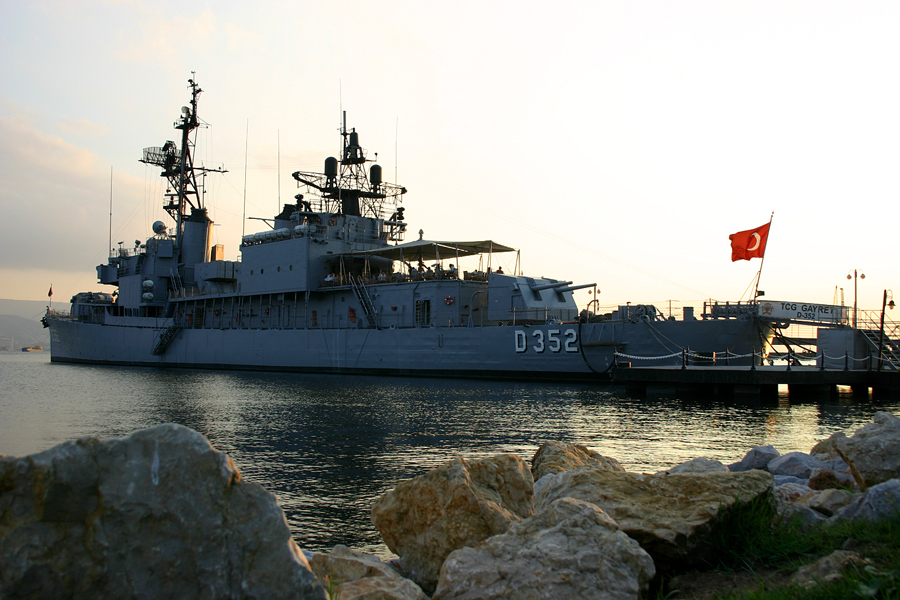
D-352 TCG Gayret as a museum ship (TCG Gayret Museum) in Izmit, Turkey.

Name	Builder	Launched	Acquired	Fate
TCG Yücetepe (D-345)	(United States) Consolidated, Orange, TX	12 May 1945 as Ex-USS Orleck (DD-886)	1 October 1982	Returned to the USA 12 August 2000 as museum ship - now in Jacksonville, Florida as of 26 March 2022
TCG Savaştepe (D-348)	(United States) Consolidated, Orange, TX	28 June 1945 as Ex-USS Meredith (DD-890)	29 June 1979	Scrapped 1995
TCG Kılıç Ali Paşa (D-349)	(United States) Consolidated, Orange, TX	9 November 1945 as Ex-USS Robert H. McCard (DD-822)	5 June 1980	Decommissioned 1998; Scrapped 2000
TCG Piyale Paşa (D-350)	(United States) Bath Iron Works, Bath, ME	8 September 1945 as Ex-USS Fiske (DD-842)	5 June 1980	Ran aground & damaged 1996; Scrapped 1999
TCG Mareşal Fevzi Çakmak (D-351)	(United States) Bethlehem Steel, Quincy, MA	15 March 1946 as Ex-USS Charles H. Roan (DD-853)	September 1973	Damaged by friendly warplane fire during Operation Atilla 21 July 1974; Scrapped January 1994
TCG Gayret (D-352)	(United States) Todd Pacific, Seattle, WA	8 January 1946 as Ex-USS Eversole (DD-789)	11 July 1973	Stricken 1995; Museum ship at the Kocaeli Museum Ships Command
TCG Adatepe (D-353)	(United States) Bethlehem Mariners Harbor, Staten Island, NY	17 January 1946 as Ex-USS Forrest Royal (DD-872)	27 March 1971	Decommissioned 6 August 1993; Scrapped
TCG Kocatepe (D-354)	(United States) Bethlehem Shipbuilding, San Pedro, CA	22 May 1945 as Ex-USS Harwood (DD-861)	17 December 1971	Sunk in error by Turkish aircraft during Turkish invasion of Cyprus 21 July 1974
TCG Kocatepe (D354)	(United States) Bethlehem, San Pedro, CA	25 February 1945 as Ex-USS Norris (DD-859)	1 July 1974 as replacement for ex-USS Harwood above	Decommissioned & sold for scrap June 1994
TCG Tınaztepe (D-355)	(United States) Bethlehem Shipbuilding Corporation, San Francisco, CA	24 June 1946 as Ex-USS Keppler (DD-765)	1 July 1972	Collided with civilian petrol tanker Aygaz-3 in the Izmit gulf 2 May 1984; Decommissioned 31 October 1984; Scrapped

=== Ex-Carpenter class (US Navy) ===
Ex- (United States) US Navy Carpenter-class anti-submarine destroyer:

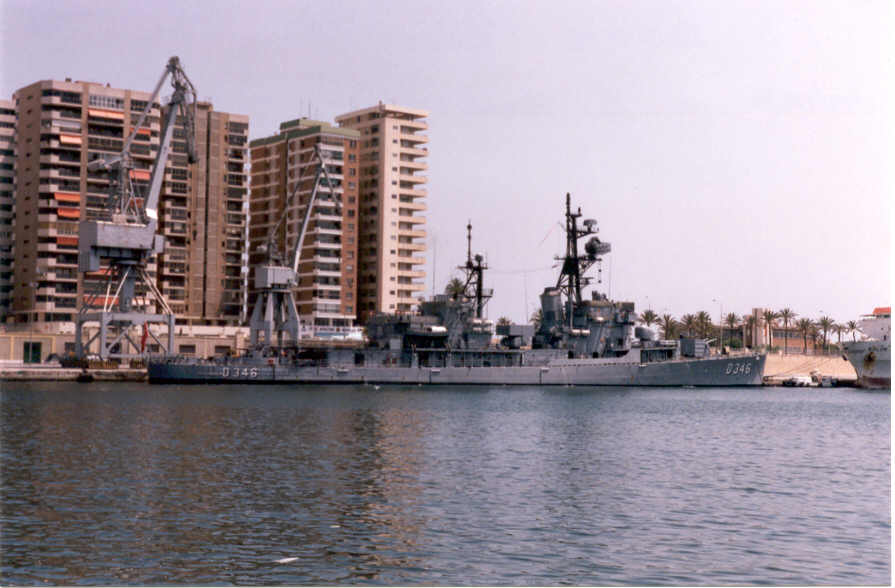
D-346 TCG Alçıtepe in Málaga, Spain.

Name	Builder	Launched	Acquired	Fate
TCG Alçi Tepe (D-346)	(United States) Bath Iron Works, Bath, ME	15 July 1946 as Ex-USS Robert A. Owens (DD-827)	16 February 1982	Decommissioned & scrapped 1999
TCG Anıttepe (D-347)	(United States) Consolidated, Orange, TX	30 December 1945 as Ex-USS Carpenter (DD-825)	20 February 1981 (leased to Turkey); Purchased 8 June 1987	Decommissioned November 1997; Stricken March 1998; Broken-up 1999

== Frigates ==
=== Berk class ===
(Modified (United States) US Navy Claud Jones-class destroyer escort):

Name	Builder	Launched	Commissioned	Fate
TCG Berk (D-358)	(Turkey) Gölcük Naval Shipyard	25 June 1971	12 July 1972	Decommissioned 1995
TCG Peyk (D-359)	(Turkey) Gölcük Naval Shipyard	7 June 1972	24 July 1975	Unknown

=== Gelibolu class ===
(Ex- (Germany) Bundesmarine Köln-class frigate: F120)

Name	Builder	Launched	Acquired	Fate
TCG Gelibolu (D-360)	(Germany) HC Stülcken, Hamburg	15 August 1959 as Ex-Karlsruhe (F223) (Bundesmarine)	28 March 1983 as Gazi Osman Pasa	renamed Gelibolu 1984; Decommissioned 27 June 1994; Scrapped
TCG Gemlik (D-361)	(Germany) HC Stülcken, Hamburg	21 March 1959 as Ex-Emden (F221) (Bundesmarine)	23 September 1983	Decommissioned & scrapped after fire on board in 1992; replaced by another ship given the same name which was originally to be used for spare parts in 1989; Decommissioned & scrapped July 1994

=== Tepe-class frigate ===
(Ex-Knox-class frigate (United States) US Navy ):

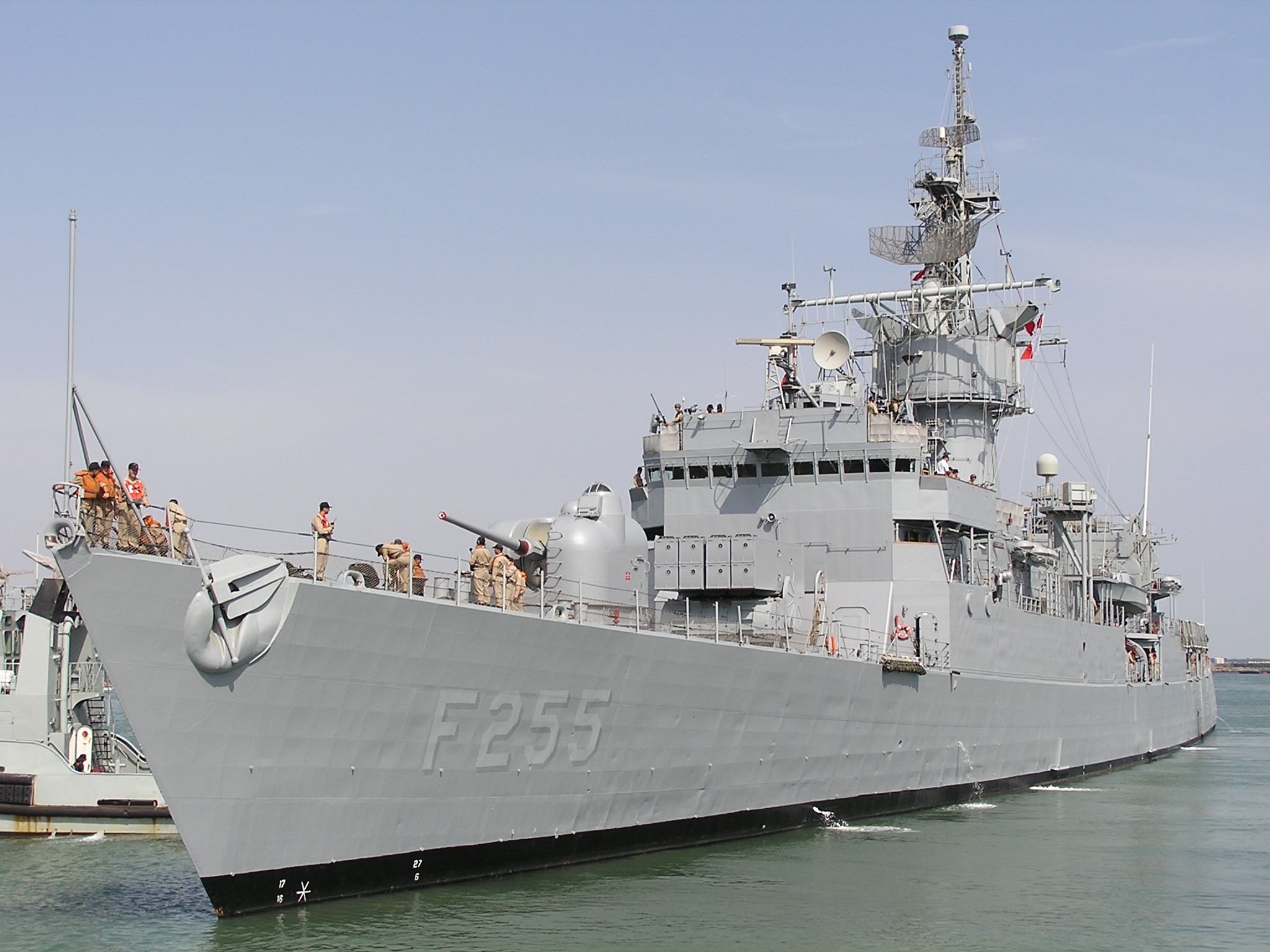
TCG Karadeniz (F-255), a Tepe (Knox)-class frigate of the Turkish Navy, in Rota, Cádiz, Spain on April 7, 2004.

Name	Builder	Launched	Acquired	Fate
TCG Muavenet (F-250)	(United States) Avondale, Westwego, LA	21 October 1972 as Ex-USS Capodanno (FF-1093)	30 July 1993 leased to Turkey; 22 February 2002 sold to Turkey	Decommissioned 2012
TCG Adatepe (F-251)	(United States) Todd, San Pedro, California	24 January 1970 as Ex-USS Fanning (FF-1076)	31 July 1993	Decommissioned 2001
TCG Kocatepe (F-252)	(United States) Lockheed, Seattle, WA	1 August 1970 as Ex-USS Reasoner (FF-1063)	28 August 1993 leased to Turkey; 22 February 2002 sold to Turkey	Sunk as target in Mediterranean, 4 May 2005
TCG Zafer (F-253)	(United States) Avondale, Westwego, LA	12 August 1972 as Ex-USS Thomas C. Hart (FF-1092)	30 August 1993	Stricken 14 June 2016; Sunk as target ship in Turkish Navy exercise Beyaz Fırtına 2016
TCG Ege (F-256)	(United States) Avondale, Westwego, LA	15 April 1972 as Ex-USS Ainsworth (FF-1090)	27 May 1994 under lease	Decommissioned 21 March 2005; Museum ship İnciraltı Sea Museum, Izmir, Turkey
TCG Karadeniz (F-255)	(United States) Avondale, Westwego, LA	22 May 1971 as Ex-USS Donald B. Beary (FF-1085)	1994 leased to Turkey; 2 February 2002 sold to Turkey	Decommissioned & scrapped 2006
TCG Trakya (F-254)	(United States) Avondale, Westwego, LA	20 March 1971 as Ex-USS McCandless (FF-1084)	6 May 1994 leased to Turkey; February 2002 sold to Turkey	Decommissioned 2003; Scrapped
TCG Akdeniz (F-257)	(United States) Avondale, Westwego, LA	2 May 1970 as Ex-USS Bowen (FF-1079)	30 June 1994 leased to Turkey; 22 February 2002 sold to Turkey	Decommissioned 2011

=== Gabya class ===
(Ex-Oliver Hazard Perry-class frigate (United States) US Navy):

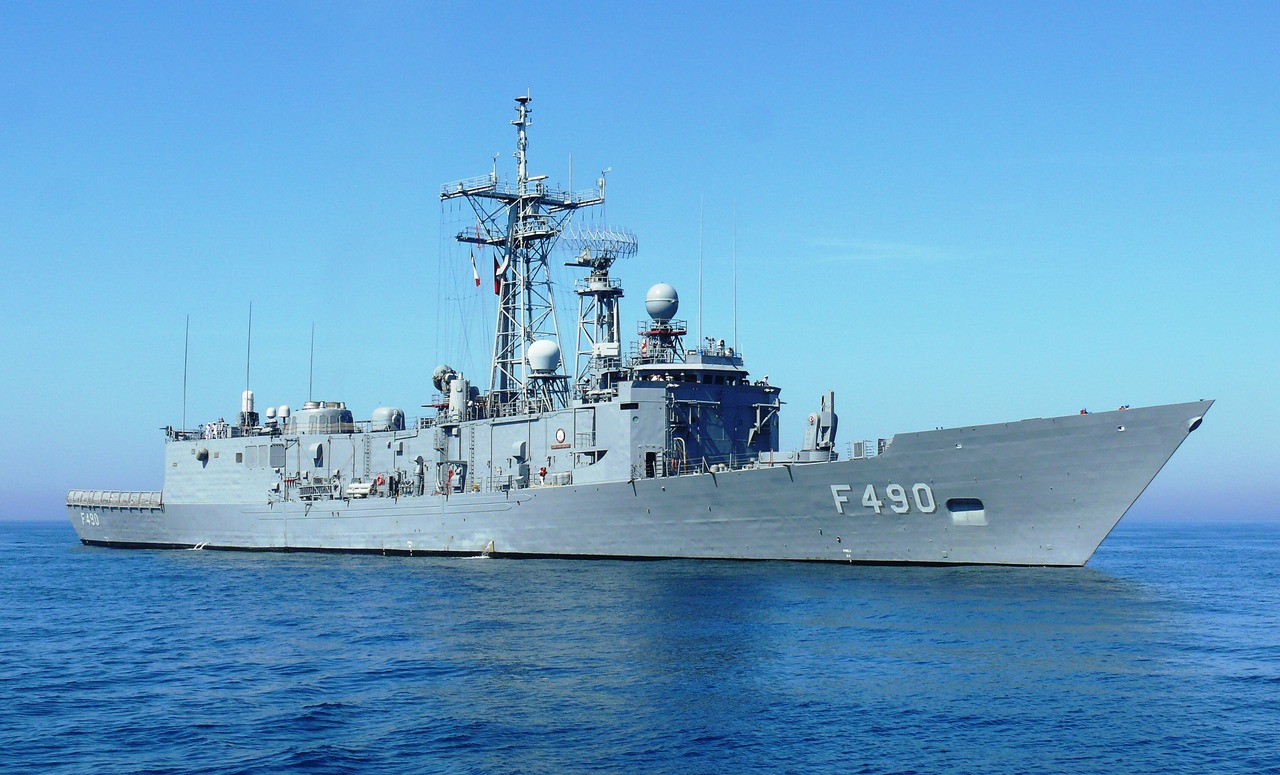
F-490 TCG Gaziantep, a G-class (Oliver Hazard Perry-class) frigate of the Turkish Navy, in Cartagena, Spain, on May 31, 2010.

Name	Builder	Launched	Acquired	Fate
TCG Gaziantep (F-490)	(United States) Bath Iron Works, Bath, ME	16 February 1980; Ex-USS Clifton Sprague (FFG-16)	27 August 1997	Active
TCG Giresun (F-491)	(United States) Todd Pacific, Seattle, WA	27 March 1979; Ex-USS Antrim (FFG-20)	27 August 1997	Active
TCG Gemlik (F-492)	(United States) Bath Iron Works, Bath, ME	15 May 1980; Ex-USS Flatley (FFG-21)	27 August 1998	Active
TCG Gelibolu (F-493)	(United States) Todd Pacific, San Pedro, CA	27 June 1981; Ex-USS Reid (FFG-30)	5 January 1999	Active
TCG Gökçeada (F-494)	(United States) Todd Pacific, San Pedro, CA	7 February 1981; Ex-USS Mahlon S. Tisdale (FFG-27)	5 April 1999	Active
TCG Gediz (F-495)	(United States) Todd Pacific, San Pedro, CA	20 October 1979; Ex-USS John A. Moore (FFG-19)	1 September 2000	Active
TCG Gökova (F-496)	(United States) Bath Iron Works, Bath, ME	14 July 1979; Ex-USS Samuel Eliot Morison (FFG-13)	11 April 2002	Active
TCG Göksu (F-497)	(United States) Bath Iron Works, Bath, ME	3 November 1979; Ex-USS Estocin (FFG-15)	3 April 2003	Active

=== Yavuz class ===
( (Germany) Blohm + Voss MEKO 200 TN):

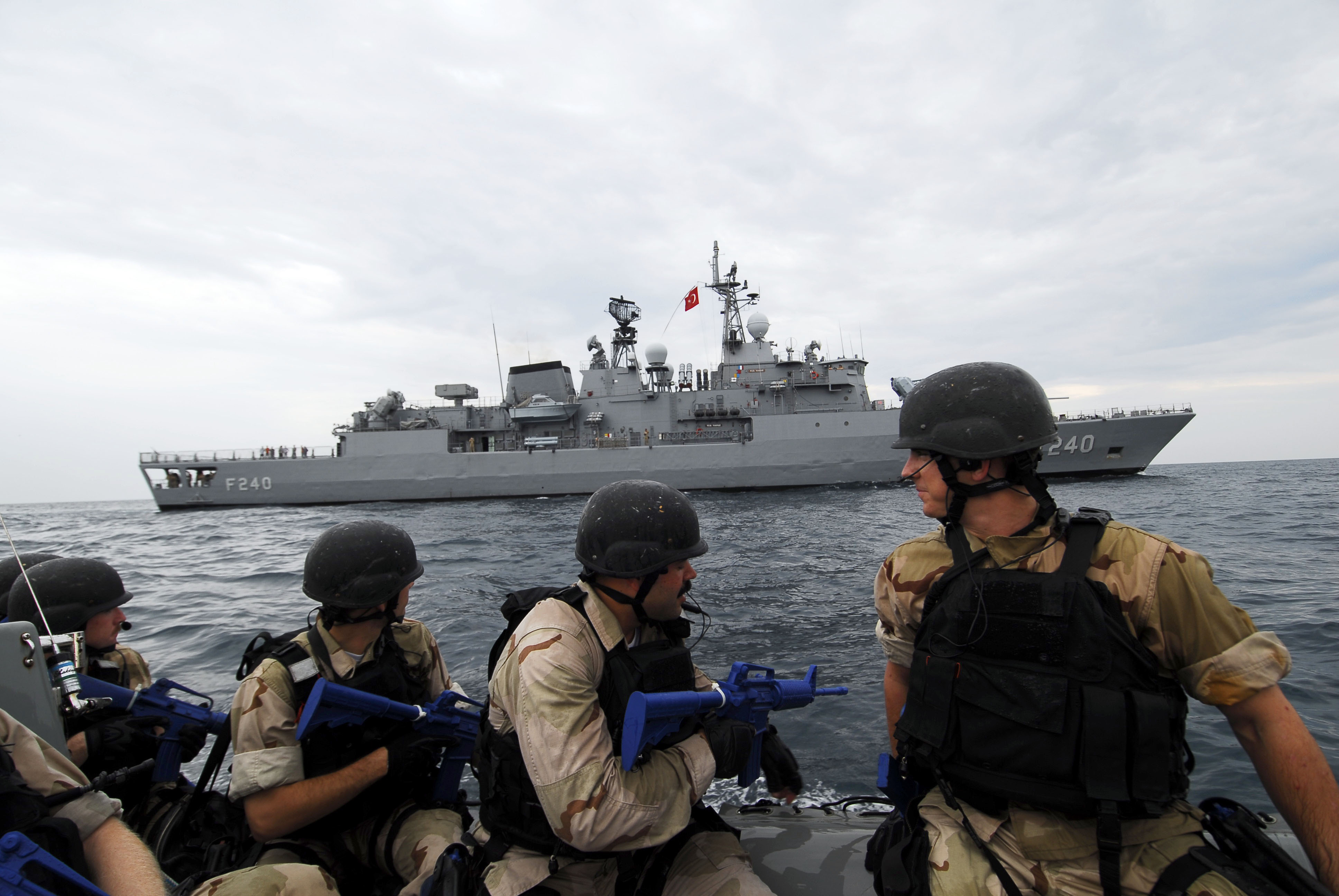
U.S. Marines from USS Taylor (FFG-50) preparing to board TCG Yavuz (F-240), a Yavuz class (MEKO 200 TN Track I) frigate of the Turkish Navy, during the NATO Exercise Sea Breeze 2010 in the Black Sea.

Name	Builder	Launched	Commissioned	Fate
TCG Yavuz (F-240)	(Germany) Blohm + Voss, Hamburg	30 May 1985	11 October 1987	Active
TCG Turgutreis (F-241)	(Germany) Howaldtswerke-Deutsche Werft, Kiel	17 July 1987	4 February 1988	Active
TCG Fatih (F-242)	(Turkey) Gölcük Naval Shipyard, Kocaeli	24 April 1987	12 October 1988	Active
TCG Yıldırım (F-243)	(Turkey) Gölcük Naval Shipyard, Kocaeli	22 July 1988	17 November 1989	Active

=== Barbaros class ===
( (Germany) Blohm + Voss MEKO 200 TN II-A):

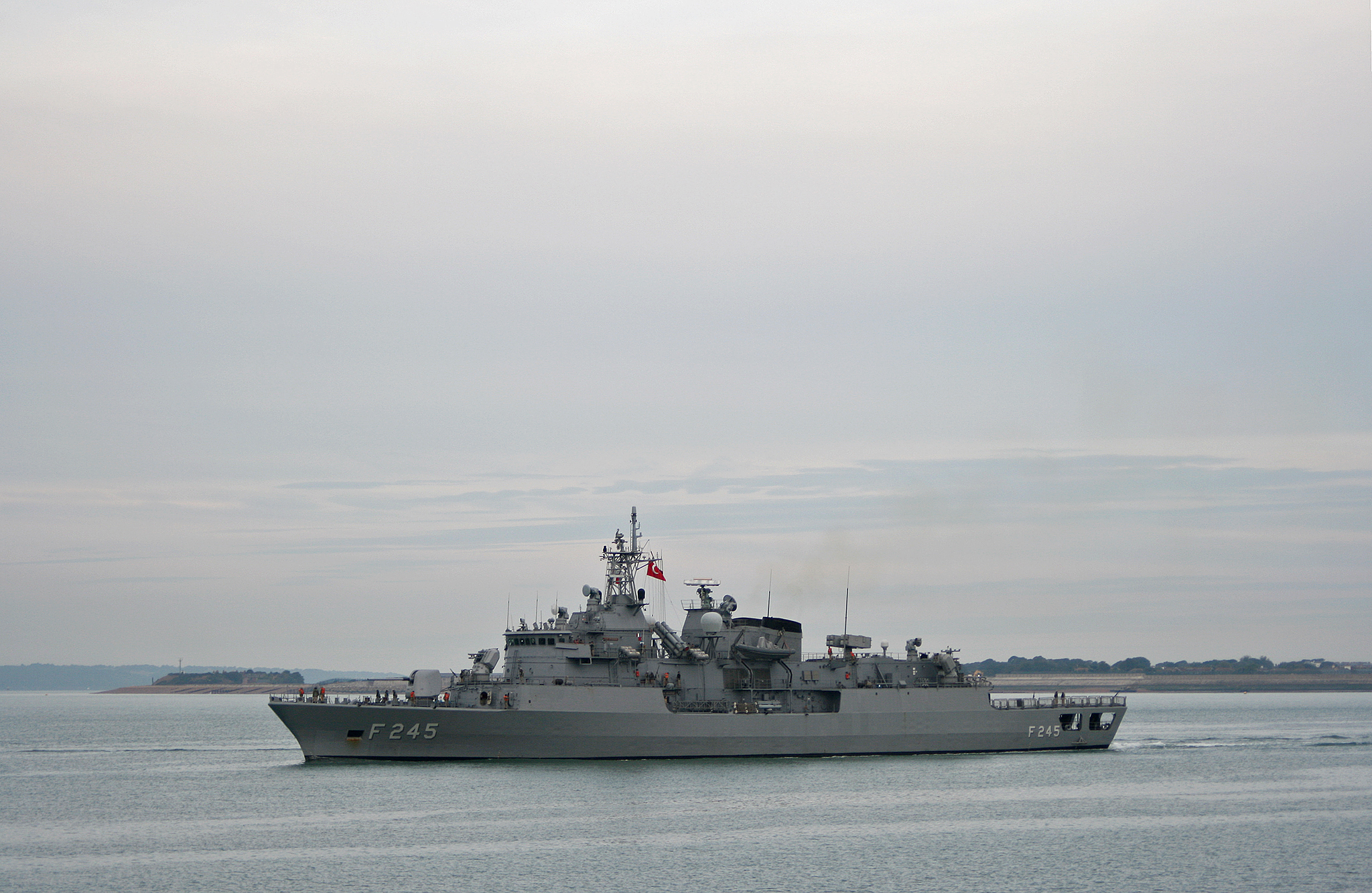
F-245 TCG Oruç Reis, a Barbaros class (MEKO 200 TN Track II-A) frigate, departing from Portsmouth Naval Base in the United Kingdom, on September 21, 2009. Off the bows in the distance is Fort Gilkicker, and beyond (to the left) the Isle of Wight.

Name	Builder	Launched	Commissioned	Fate
TCG Barbaros (F-244)	(Germany) Blohm + Voss, Hamburg	29 September 1993	23 May 1997	Active
TCG Oruçreis (F-245)	(Turkey) Gölcük Naval Shipyard	28 July 1994	23 May 1997	Active

=== Salihreis class ===
( (Germany) Blohm + Voss MEKO 200 TN II-B):

Name	Builder	Launched	Commissioned	Fate
TCG Salihreis (F-246)	(Germany) Blohm + Voss, Hamburg	26 September 1997	22 July 1998	Active
TCG Kemalreis (F-247)	(Turkey) Gölcük Naval Shipyard, Kocaeli	22 July 1998	8 June 2000	Active

== Corvettes ==
=== Burak class ===
(Ex-D'Estienne d'Orves class (France) French Navy):

Name	Builder	Launched	Acquired	Fate
TCG Bozcaada (F-500)	(France) DCN, Lorient	20 May 1978 as Ex-F787 Commandant de Pimodan	2000	Active
TCG Bodrum (F-501)	(France) DCN, Lorient	30 November 1974 as Ex-F783 Drogou	November 2000	Decommissioned 2022
TCG Bandırma (F-502)	(France) DCN, Lorient	7 August 1976 as Ex-F786 Quartier-Maître Anquetil	November 2000	Active
TCG Beykoz (F-503)	(France) DCN, Lorient	1 June 1973 as Ex-F781 D'Estienne d'Orves	26 June 2002	Active
TCG Bartın (F-504)	(France) DCN, Lorient	30 November 1974 as Ex-F782 Amyot d'Inville	3 June 2002	Active
TCG Bafra (F-505)	(France) DCN, Lorient	13 August 1977 as Ex-F788 Second-Maître Le Bihan	26 June 2002	Active

=== Ada class ===
( (Turkey) - MILGEM):

Name	Builder	Launched	Commissioned	Fate
TCG Heybeliada (F-511)	(Turkey) Istanbul Naval Shipyard	27 September 2008	27 September 2011	Active
TCG Büyükada (F-512)	(Turkey) Istanbul Naval Shipyard	27 September 2011	27 September 2013	Active
TCG Burgazada (F-513)	(Turkey) Istanbul Naval Shipyard	21 June 2016	4 November 2018	Active
TCG Kınalıada (F-514)	(Turkey) Istanbul Naval Shipyard	3 July 2017	29 September 2019	Active
