= Berners =

Berners is an English family name deriving from Hugh de Berners (Hugo de Bernières, from Bernières-d'Ailly, Normandy), who came with the Norman invasion in 1066. The name may refer to:

- Juliana Berners (born c.1388), English nun and writer on heraldry, hawking and hunting
- Franz-Josef Berners (born 1945), German politician
- William Berners (disambiguation)
- The Barons Berners, including the composer and writer Gerald Tyrwhitt-Wilson, 14th Baron Berners (1883–1950), often referred to as Lord Berners.

== See also ==
- Bernières (disambiguation)
