= TCG Adatepe =

TCG Adatepe is the name of the following ships of the Turkish Navy:

- TCG Adatepe (1931), one of two Adatepe-class destroyers in commission 1931–1954
- TCG Adatepe (D 353), ex-USS Forrest Royal (DD-872), a Gearing-class destroyer acquired in 1971, scrapped in 1993
- TCG Adatepe (F 251), ex-USS Fanning (FF-1076), a Knox-class frigate acquired in 1993, decommissioned in 2001

== See also ==
- Adatepe (disambiguation)
