= TCG Tınaztepe =

TCG Tınaztepe is the name of the following ships of the Turkish Navy:

- TCG Tınaztepe (1931), lead Tınaztepe-class destroyer, in commission 1932–1954
- TCG Tınaztepe (D 355), ex-USS Keppler (DD-765), a Gearing-class destroyer acquired in 1972, decommissioned in 1984
