= TCG Bandırma =

TCG Bandırma is the name of the following ships of the Turkish Navy:

- TCG Bandırma (P 129), ex-HMCS Kenora, a Bangor-class minesweeper acquired in 1957, discarded in 1972
- TCG Bandırma (F 502), ex-Quartier-Maître Anquetil, a D'Estienne d'Orves-class aviso acquired from France in 2000, in commission since 2002

== See also ==
- Bandırma
- SS Bandırma
