= TCG Bodrum =

TCG Bodrum is the name of the following ships of the Turkish Navy:

- TCG Bodrum (P 125), ex-HMCS Fort William (J311), a Bangor-class minesweeper acquired 1957, discarded in 1971
- TCG Bodrum (F 501), ex-Drogou, a D'Estienne d'Orves-class aviso acquired from France in 2002, decommissioned in 2022

== See also ==
- Bodrum
