= TCG Bartın =

TCG Bartın is the name of the following ships of the Turkish Navy:

- TCG Bartın (P 130), ex-HMCS Kentville, a Bangor-class minesweeper acquired in 1957 and decommissioned in 1972
- TCG Bartın (F 504), ex-Amyot d'Inville, a D'Estienne d'Orves-class aviso acquired from France in 2002, in active service

== See also ==
- Bartın
