= Bernières =

Bernières may refer to:

== Places ==
=== France ===
- Bernières, Seine-Maritime, in the Seine-Maritime département
- Bernières-d'Ailly in the Calvados département
- Bernières-le-Patry in the Calvados département
- Bernières-sur-Mer in the Calvados département
- Bernières-sur-Seine in the Eure département

=== Canada ===
- Bernières municipality in the district of Saint-Nicolas, Quebec

== People ==
- Henri de Bernières (c.1635–1700), French Catholic priest, first resident pastor of Quebec
- Louis de Bernières (born 1954), British novelist

== See also ==
- Berners
