= Adatepe =

Adatepe is a Turkish word that may refer to:

== People ==
- Ertan Adatepe, a top scorer in Turkish football in the mid-1960s
- Ülkü Adatepe, the youngest adopted daughter of Mustafa Kemal Atatürk, the founder of Turkey

== Places ==
- Adatepe (volcano), an extinct volcano in southeast Bulgaria
- Adatepe, Ayvacık, a populated place in Çanakkale Province, Turkey
- Adatepe Dam, a dam in Kahramanmaraş Province, Turkey
- Adatepe, Devrek, a village in Zonguldak Province, Turkey
- Adatepe, Lapseki, a populated place in Çanakkale Province, Turkey
- Adatepe, Vezirköprü, a village in Samsun Province, Turkey

== Ships ==
- Adatepe-class destroyer, two former destroyers of the Turkish Navy
- TCG Adatepe (D 353), a Gearing-class former destroyer of the Turkish Navy
