= TCG Bafra =

TCG Bafra is the name of the following ships of the Turkish Navy:

- TCG Bafra (P 121), ex-HMCS Nipigon (J154), a Bangor-class minesweeper acquired in 1957, stricken in 1972
- TCG Bafra (F 505), ex-Second-Maître Le Bihan, a D'Estienne d'Orves-class aviso acquired from France in 2002, in active service

== See also ==
- Bafra
