= TCG Beykoz =

TCG Beykoz is the name of the following ships of the Turkish Navy, named for the municipality of Beykoz:

- TCG Beykoz (P 122), ex-HMCS Blairmore, a Bangor-class minesweeper acquired in 1958, discarded in 1971
- TCG Beykoz (F 503), ex-D'Estienne d'Orves, a D'Estienne d'Orves-class aviso, acquired from France in 2002, in active service
