= Bernard Anquetil =

French Resistance (1929-1941

- Born: 20 December 1916; Bernières-d'Ailly
- Died: 24 October 1941 (aged 24); Fort Mont-Valérien
- Burial place: Colleville-sur-Mer
- Occupation: French Resistance
- Awards: See Awards

Bernard Anquetil (1916–1941) was a French Resistance and a Compagnon de la Libération.

== Career ==
Bernard Anquetil embarked on the Ouessant submarine in June 1940, refit at the arsenal of Brest; when the Germans occupied the city, the crew of the submarine was dispersed. Anquetil found a job as a radio repairman in Angers. It was there that, recommended by the former Ouessant second officer, lieutenant Philippon (future vice-admiral of the squadron), he met Colonel Rémy and with enthusiasm, Bernard Anquetil accepted to join the BCRA network in the process of being set up, to ensure radio links with England. With his transmitter, he moved to a discreet family, Les Combes in Saumur. The messages it transmitted mainly concerned the movements of Kriegsmarine ships in Brest, their damage and their availability, such as the characteristics and movements of the German battleship Bismark, which by these actions was sunk off Brest on 27 May 1941. It was in this way in particular that the Scharnhorst departure was also reported in July 1941, which enabled the Royal Air Force to attack it successfully.

However, German radio direction finders eventually located the transmitter and on 30 July, precisely following the Scharnhorst message, Anquetil was arrested and transferred to Fresnes. Sentenced to death on 15 October, he refused to reveal the origin and content of the messages transmitted, despite the promise of the court's support for a pardon. On 24 October 1941 he was shot at Fort Mont-Valérien.

He is buried in the cemetery of Montrouge, in the “square of the executed”.

After the war, his body joined the family vault of Colleville-sur-Mer in the department of Calvados.

== Awards ==
Compagnon de la Libération

Croix de Guerre 1939–1945

Médaille de la Résistance

== Legacy ==
- A French D'Estienne d'Orves-class aviso has been named after him.
- A street along the beach of Saint-Laurent-sur-Mer (neighboring town of Colleville-sur-Mer) has been named after him since the 1990s.

== Notes ==
- Hubert Granier, "History of French sailors: World War II and the first revolts in the Empire, 1940-1945" (2008)
- Pierre de Longuemar, “Memorial 1939-1945: the commitment of members of the nobility and their allies” (2001)
- Georges-Marc Benamou, “The rebels of the year 40” (2010)
- Remy, "An Epic of the Resistance ...: In France, Belgium and the Grand Duchy of Luxembourg" (1981)
- Henri Darrieus, Jean Quéguiner, “History of the French Navy: 1922-1942” (1996)
- "In that time, de Gaulle, Volume 1" (1971)

== See also ==
- French military ranks
