= Henri de Pimodan =

French naval officer (1930-1945

- Born: 22 October 1911; Maine-et-Loire
- Died: 18 April 1945 (aged 33); Ludwigslust
- Military career
- Allegiance: France
- Branch: French Navy
- Service years: 1930–1945
- Rank: Corvette captain
- Conflicts: World War II
- Awards: See Awards

Henri de Rarécourt de La Vallée de Pimodan (22 October 1911 – 18 April 1945) was a French naval officer.

== Career ==
Henri de Pimodan entered the Naval School in 1930. He graduated 6th and chose to serve in the marines.

He sailed in the Atlantic aboard the Ville d'Ys then the Jules-Verne, and then in the Mediterranean aboard the Duquesne. In 1937, he was instructor at the École des fusiliers.

At the start of World War II, appointed lieutenant in 1940, he sailed on the cruiser Georges Leygues aboard which he distinguished himself at the Battle of Dakar. He embarked on the cruiser Jean de Vienne based in Toulon.

Embarked on the Jean de Vienne, he witnessed the scuttling of his ship in Toulon on 27 November 1942 with the French fleet. He was then appointed to a staff reclassification service, then to the State Secretariat for Industrial Production. He joined the Resistance, within the Army Resistance Organization.

He was arrested on 5 February 1944 by the Gestapo. Tortured in the annex of the Rue Mallet-Stevens of the French Gestapo, but he refused to speak. He was then deported to the Ludwigslust camp in Nazi Germany. During his captivity, he was promoted to lieutenant-commander on 1 March 1945. He died in the camp on 18 April 1945.

== Awards ==
Croix de Guerre 1939–1945

Médaille de la Résistance

== Legacy ==
- A French aviso launched in 1942, has been named after him.
- A French D'Estienne d'Orves-class aviso launched in 1978, has been named after him.

== See also ==
- French military ranks
