= Marcel Pierre Marie Le Bihan =

French naval officer (1930-1945

- Born: 23 April 1916; Douarnenez
- Died: 15 June 1940 (aged 24); Brignoles
- Military career
- Allegiance: France
- Branch: French Navy
- Service years: 1935-1940
- Rank: Second maître
- Conflicts: World War II

Marcel Pierre Marie Le Bihan (23 April 1916 – 15 June 1940) was a naval officer and naval aviator of the French Navy.

== Career ==
He joined the Navy in April 1935 then passed and got his pilot's license. Second master, he served on Dunkirk as the pilot of one of the seaplanes on board.

Sent to the CA 3 fighter flotilla in Cuers in January 1940 to protect Toulon, he fought a formation of Italian planes on 15 June 1940 on a Bloch MB.151. After being hit, he deliberately collided with one of his opponents, whom he took in his fall. Seriously injured and burned, he died a few hours later at the Brignoles hospital.

== Legacy ==
- A French D'Estienne d'Orves-class aviso launched in 1977, has been named after him.

== See also ==
- French military ranks
