= Robert H. McCard =

WWII Medal of Honor Recipient

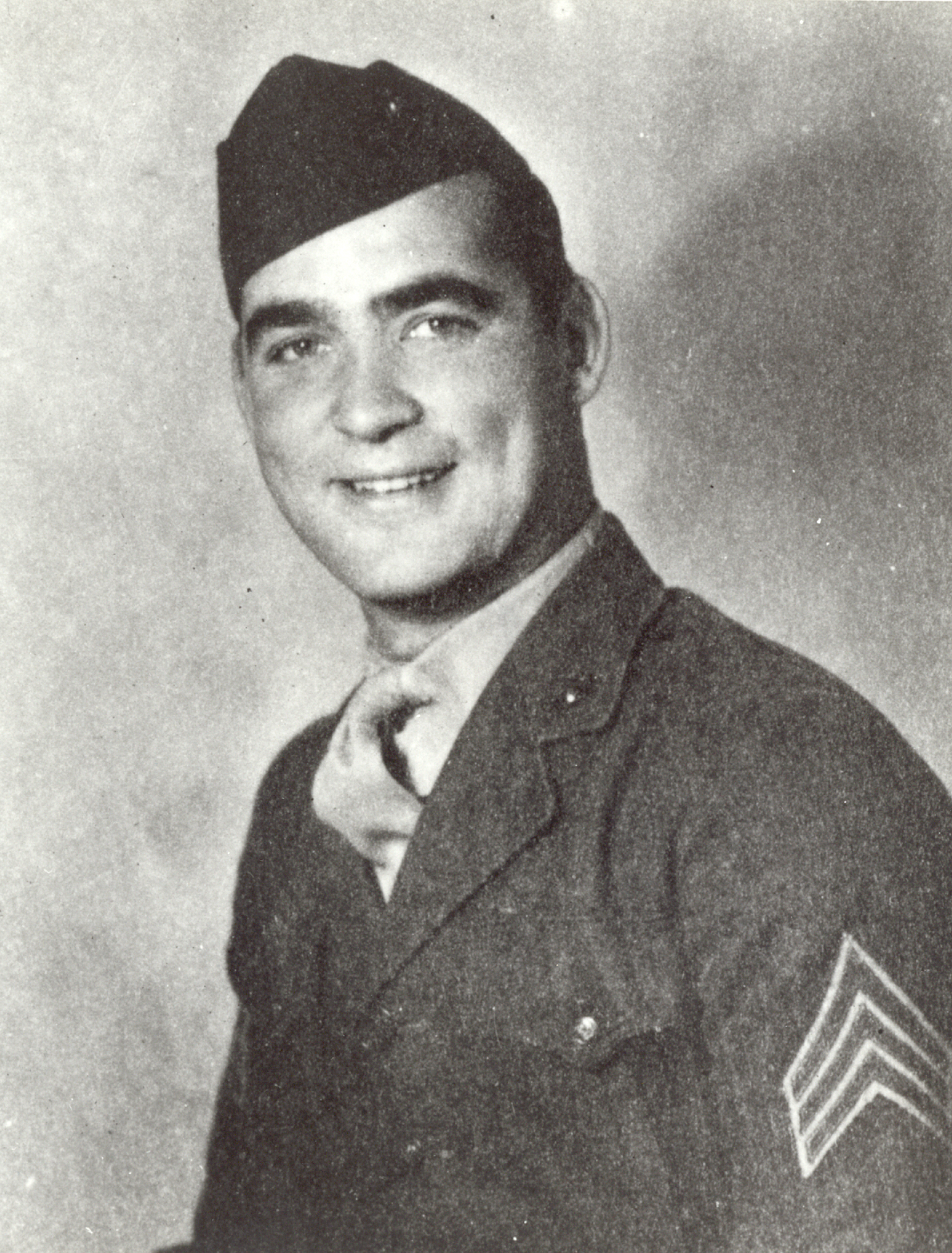
- Born: November 25, 1918; Syracuse, New York
- Died: June 16, 1944 (aged 25); Saipan, Northern Mariana Islands
- Burial place: National Memorial Cemetery of the Pacific, Honolulu, Hawaii
- Military career
- Allegiance: United States of America
- Branch: United States Marine Corps
- Service years: 1939–1944
- Rank: Gunnery Sergeant
- Unit: 4th Tank Battalion
- Conflicts: World War II: Battle of Kwajalein; Battle of Saipan †
- Awards: Medal of Honor; Purple Heart

Gunnery Sergeant Robert Howard McCard (November 25, 1918 – June 16, 1944), was a United States Marine who posthumously received the Medal of Honor for his actions during the Battle of Saipan in World War II.

== Biography ==
Robert Howard McCard, born at Syracuse, New York, November 25, 1918, enlisted in the Marine Corps December 18, 1939. He was subsequently assigned to Parris Island, South Carolina; Norfolk Navy Yard; USS Tuscaloosa (CA-37), New York Navy Yard; U.S. Naval Torpedo Station, Newport, R.I.; and Central Recruiting Division, Chicago, Illinois. Shortly after the United States declared war against Japan in 1941, McCard was assigned to the Naval Training Station, Great Lakes, Illinois; then the Training Center, Quantico, Virginia; Camp Lejeune, North Carolina; and Camp Pendleton, California. McCard served in the field from January 31, 1944, until he was killed in action at Saipan on June 16, 1944.

== Medal of Honor citation ==
The President of the United States takes pride in presenting the MEDAL OF HONOR posthumously to

GUNNERY SERGEANT ROBERT H. MCCARD
UNITED STATES MARINE CORPS

for service as set forth in the following CITATION:

For conspicuous gallantry and intrepidity at the risk of his life above and beyond the call of duty while serving as Platoon Sergeant of Company A, Fourth Tank Battalion, Fourth Marine Division, during the battle for enemy Japanese-held Saipan, Mariana Islands, on June 16, 1944. Cut off from the other units of his platoon when his tank was put out of action by a battery of enemy 77-mm. guns, Gunnery Sergeant McCard carried on resolutely, bringing all the tank's weapons to bear on the enemy, until the severity of hostile fire caused him to order his crew out the escape hatch while he courageously exposed himself to enemy guns by hurling hand grenades, in order to cover the evacuation of his men. Seriously wounded during this action and with his supply of grenades exhausted, Gunnery Sergeant McCard dismantled one of the Tank's machine guns and faced the Japanese for the second time to deliver vigorous fire into positions, destroying sixteen of the enemy but sacrificing himself to ensure the safety of his crew. His valiant fighting spirit and supreme loyalty in the face of almost certain death reflect the highest credit upon Gunnery Sergeant McCard and the United States Naval Service. He gallantly gave his life for his country.

/S/ FRANKLIN D. ROOSEVELT

== Awards and decorations ==

1st row	Medal of Honor		
2nd row	Purple Heart	Navy Commendation Medal with "V" Device	Combat Action Ribbon
3rd row	Presidential Unit Citation	Marine Corps Good Conduct Medal	American Defense Service Medal with 1 Service star
4th row	American Campaign Medal	Asiatic-Pacific Campaign Medal with 2 Campaign stars	World War II Victory Medal

== Posthumous honors ==
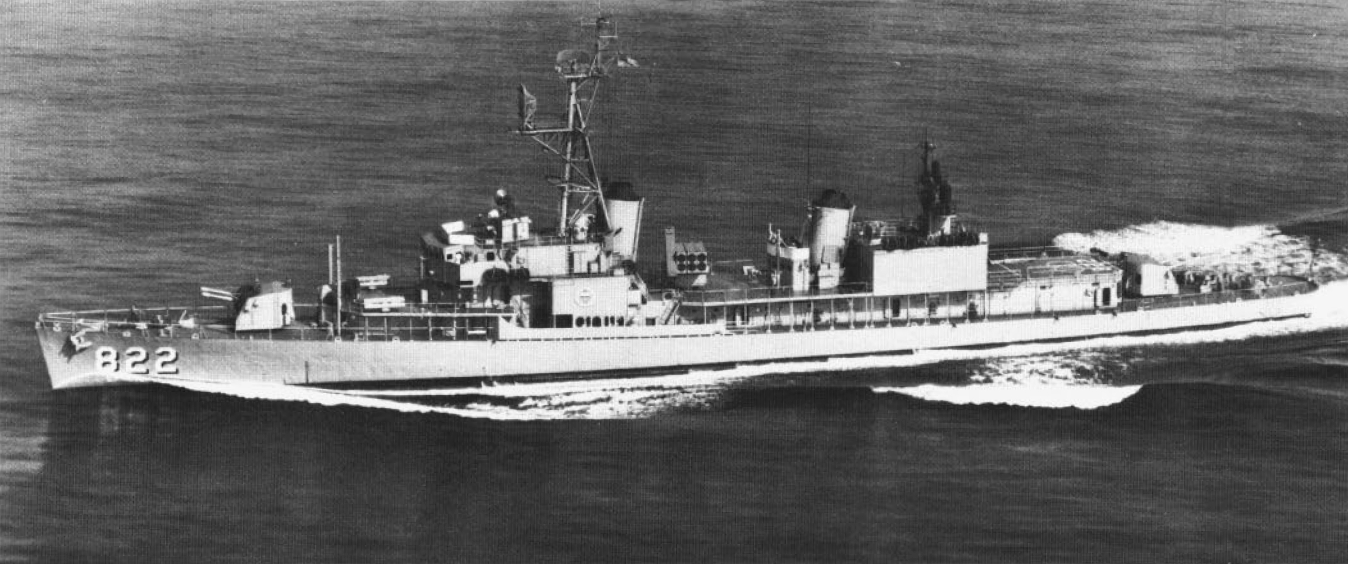
Robert H. McCard underway, circa 1978.

In 1945, the USS Robert H. McCard (DD-822), a Gearing-class destroyer, was named in his honor.

== See also ==
- List of Medal of Honor recipients
