= Burak-class corvette =

Warship in the Turkish Naval Forces

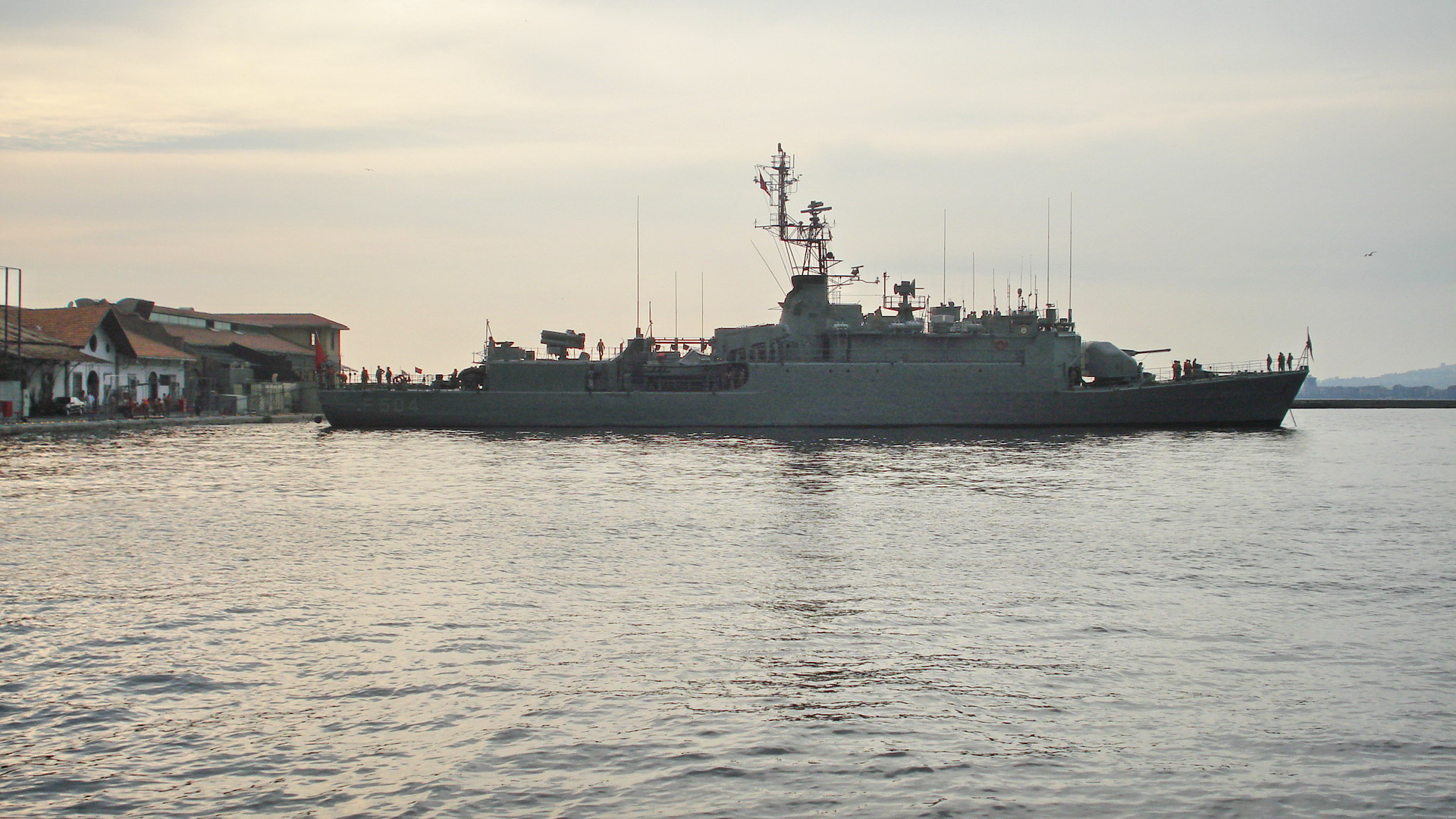
- Burak-class corvette TCG Bartın at İzmir, 2007

Class overview
- Name: Burak or B class
- Builders: Arsenal de Lorient, Lorient, France
- Operators: Turkish Navy
- Succeeded by: Ada class
- Built: 1972–1979
- In commission: 2002–present
- Active: 5
- Retired: 1

General characteristics
- Type: Corvette
- Displacement: 1,325 tonnes
- Length: 80.52 m (264 ft 2 in)
- Beam: 10.2 m (33 ft 6 in)
- Draft: 3.42 m (11 ft 3 in)
- Propulsion: 2 × SEMT-Pielstick 12PC2V400 diesels, 12,000 hp (8.95 MW)
- Speed: 23 knots (43 km/h)
- Range: 4,500 nmi (8,300 km) at 15 kn (28 km/h)
- Complement: 7 Officers, 83 P/O and enlisted
- Armament: 4 × Exocet SSM; 1 × 100 mm/55 or 76mm Oto Melara gun; 2 × 20 mm guns; 4 × L5 torpedoes; 1 × 375 mm 6 barrel ASW A/S mortars

Burak-class corvette (Turkish: Burak sınıfı korvet), also known as the B-class corvette, is a warship class of the Turkish Navy, all ex-D'Estienne d'Orves-class A69 type aviso corvettes, mainly designed for coastal anti-submarine defense & ocean escort missions. Their robust design & economical propulsion system allows them to be used for distant overseas operations.

A total of six ships under the Burak-class are being operated by the Turkish Naval Forces and will be phased out with introduction of Ada-class corvettes.

== Ships ==
- TCG Bozcaada (F-500), formerly Commandant de Pimodan (F787); retired 2026
- TCG Bodrum (F-501), formerly Drogou (F783); Retired 2022.
- TCG Bandırma (F-502), formerly Quartier-Maître Anquetil (F786)
- TCG Beykoz (F-503), formerly D'Estienne d'Orves (F781); converted to testing and training role as of 2024
- TCG Bartın (F-504), formerly Amyot d'Inville (F782)
- TCG Bafra (F-505), formerly Second-Maître Le Bihan (F788)

== Sources ==
- B (A-69) class corvette
