= Adatepe (volcano) =

Volcano in Bulgaria

Coordinates: 41°26′22″N 25°39′17″E

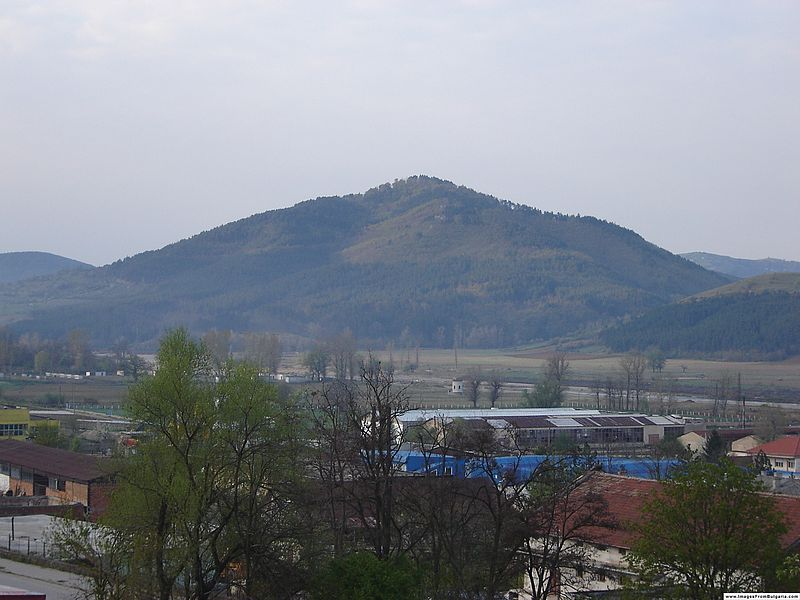
Adatepe

Adatepe is an extinct volcano in southeast Bulgaria. In 2011, a debate started about whether the volcano should be prospected for gold mining. A part of the resident population considered that the mining of Adatepe would contribute to the pollution of the nearby river, whose fresh water is used for drinking. As a result, the debate split the population into two groups. The first was in support of the mining, whilst the second group opposed it, considering nature and silence as riches of the region. Despite all the reactions, the mining of Adatepe already established. There is also an ancient mine in Adatepe.
