= USS Mahlon S. Tisdale =

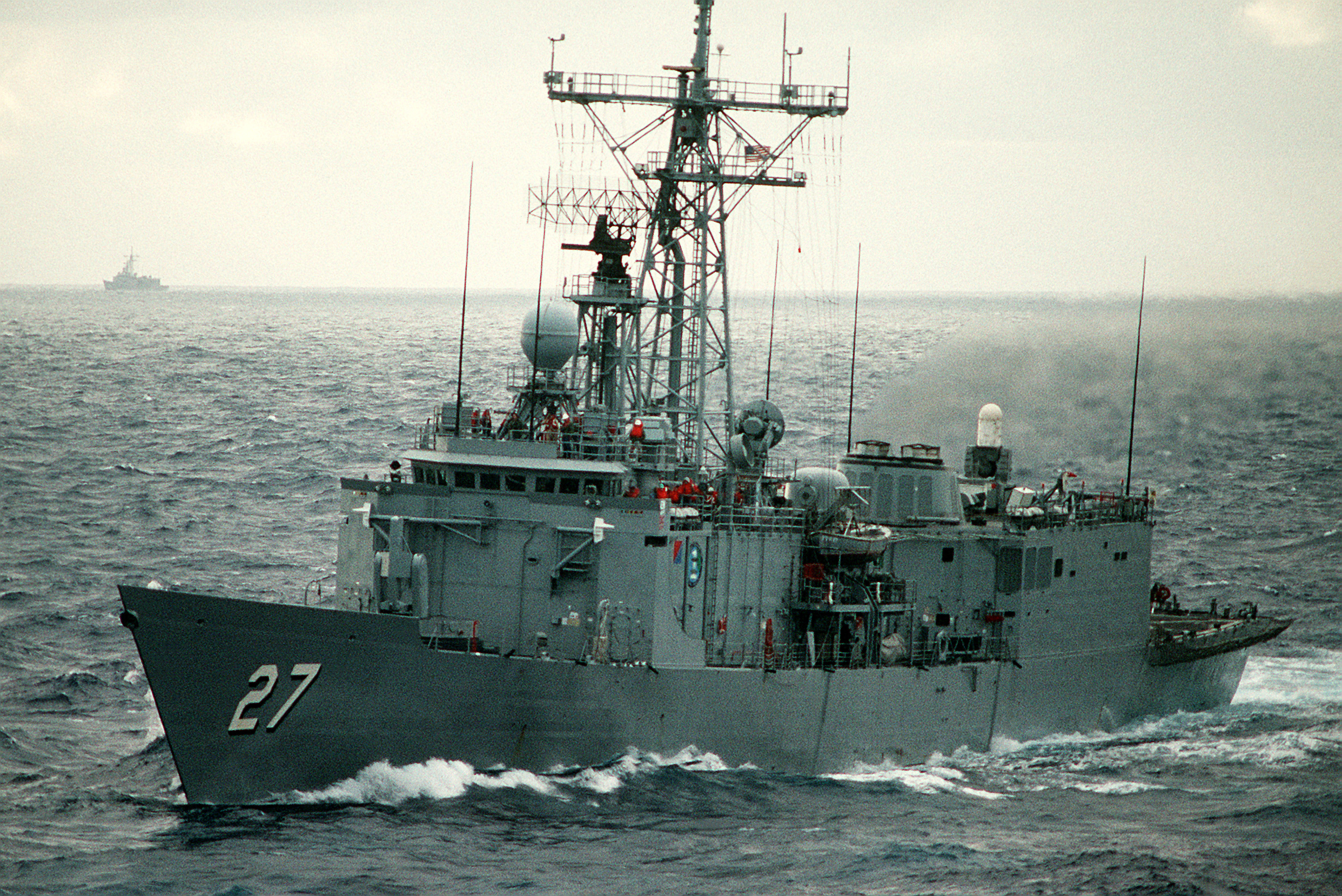
- USS Mahlon S. Tisdale (FFG-27) underway during PACEX '89

History

United States
- Name: Mahlon S. Tisdale
- Namesake: Vice Admiral Mahlon S. Tisdale
- Ordered: 23 January 1978
- Builder: Todd Pacific Shipyards, Los Angeles Division, San Pedro, CA
- Laid down: 19 March 1980
- Launched: 7 February 1981
- Sponsored by: Mrs. Kenneth J. Sanger (daughter of Mahlon Tisdale)
- Acquired: 22 October 1982
- Commissioned: 27 November 1982
- Decommissioned: 27 September 1996
- Stricken: 20 February 1998
- Home port: NB San Diego, California, U.S.
- Identification: Hull symbol:FFG-27; Code letters:NMST
- Motto: "Honneur – Patrie – Valeur"; (Honor – Heritage – Value)
- Fate: Disposed of through the Security Assistance Program (SAP), 5 April 1999
- Badge

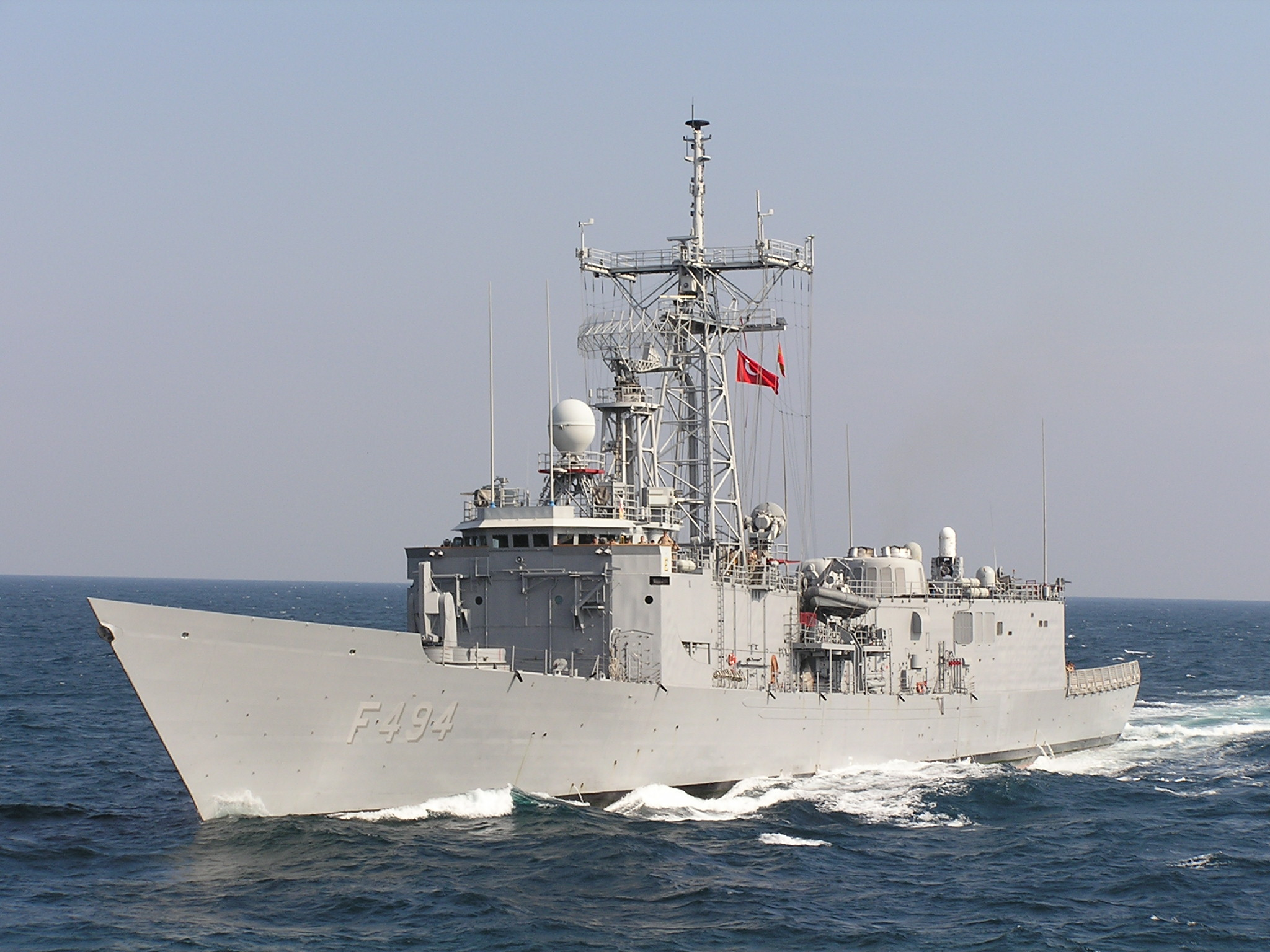
- TCG Gökçeada (F-494) in the Black Sea, 14 July 2005.

Turkey
- Name: Gökçeada
- Namesake: District of Gökçeada
- Acquired: 5 April 1999
- Identification: F 494
- Status: in active service

General characteristics
- Class & type: Oliver Hazard Perry-class frigate
- Displacement: 4,100 long tons (4,200 t), full load
- Length: 445 feet (136 m), overall
- Beam: 45 feet (14 m)
- Draught: 22 feet (6.7 m)
- Propulsion: 2 × General Electric LM2500-30 gas turbines generating 41,000 shp (31 MW) through a single shaft and variable pitch propeller; 2 × Auxiliary Propulsion Units, 350 hp (260 kW) retractable electric azimuth thrusters for maneuvering and docking.
- Speed: over 29 knots (54 km/h)
- Range: 5,000 nautical miles at 18 knots (9,300 km at 33 km/h)
- Complement: 15 officers and 190 enlisted, plus SH-60 LAMPS detachment of roughly six officer pilots and 15 enlisted maintainers
- Sensors & processing systems: AN/SPS-49 air-search radar; AN/SPS-55 surface-search radar; CAS and STIR fire-control radar; AN/SQS-56 sonar.
- Electronic warfare & decoys: AN/SLQ-32
- Armament: As built: 1 × OTO Melara Mk 75 76 mm/62 caliber naval gun; 2 × Mk 32 triple-tube (324 mm) launchers for Mark 46 torpedoes; 1 × Vulcan Phalanx CIWS; 4 × .50-cal (12.7 mm) machine guns.; 1 × Mk 13 Mod 4 single-arm launcher for Harpoon anti-ship missiles and SM-1MR Standard anti-ship/air missiles (40 round magazine); Note: As of 2004, Mk 13 systems removed from all active US vessels of this class.; G-Class Frigate: 1 × Mk 15 Phalanx CIWS; 1 × Oto Melara 76mm DP gun; 8 × Harpoon SSM; 40 × SM-1 MR SAM; 32 × ESSM launched from Mk-41 VLS (4 ESSM missiles per MK-41 cell through the use of MK25 Quadpack canisters, total of 8 cells); Two triple Mark 32 Anti-submarine warfare torpedo tubes with Mark 46 or Mark 50 anti-submarine warfare torpedoes
- Aircraft carried: 1 × SH-2F LAMPS I

USS Mahlon S. Tisdale (FFG-27), nineteenth ship of the Oliver Hazard Perry class of guided-missile frigates, was named for Vice Admiral Mahlon Street Tisdale (1890–1972). Ordered from Todd Pacific Shipyards, Los Angeles Division, San Pedro, California, on 23 January 1978 as part of the FY78 program, Mahlon S. Tisdale was laid down on 19 March 1980, launched on 7 February 1981, and commissioned on 27 November 1982.

Mahlon S. Tisdale (FFG-27) was the first ship of that name in the U.S. Navy.

== TCG Gökçeada (F 494) ==
Decommissioned on 27 September 1996 and stricken on 20 February 1998, she was transferred to Turkey on 5 April 1999 as that nation's TCG Gökçeada (F 494). As of 2018, she is still in active service.
