= USS Robert H. McCard =

Gearing-class destroyer

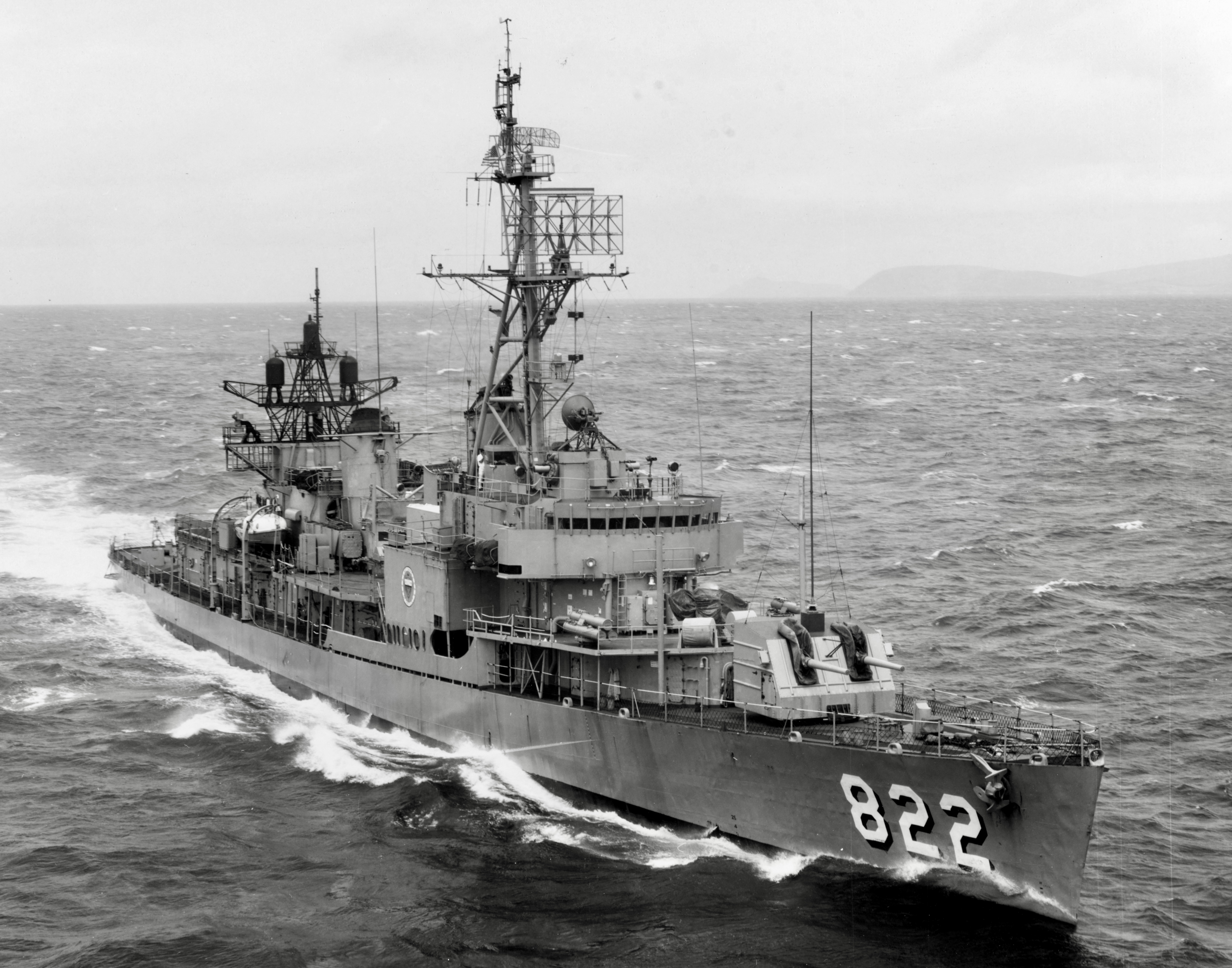
- USS Robert H. McCard

History

United States
- Name: Robert H. McCard
- Namesake: Robert H. McCard
- Builder: Consolidated Steel Corporation, Orange, Texas
- Laid down: 20 June 1945
- Launched: 9 November 1945
- Commissioned: 23 October 1946
- Decommissioned: 5 June 1980
- Stricken: 6 August 1987
- Identification: Callsign: NAYM; Hull number: DD-822
- Fate: Transferred to Turkey 5 June 1980

History

Turkey
- Name: Kılıç Ali Paşa
- Namesake: Kılıç Ali Paşa
- Acquired: 5 June 1980
- Decommissioned: 1998
- Identification: D349
- Fate: Scrapped 2000

General characteristics
- Class & type: Gearing-class destroyer
- Displacement: 3,460 long tons (3,516 t) full
- Length: 390 ft 6 in (119.02 m)
- Beam: 40 ft 10 in (12.45 m)
- Draft: 14 ft 4 in (4.37 m)
- Installed power: 60,000 shp (45 MW)
- Propulsion: Geared turbines, 2 shafts
- Speed: 35 knots (65 km/h; 40 mph)
- Range: 4,500 nmi (8,300 km) at 20 kn (37 km/h; 23 mph)
- Complement: 336
- Armament: 6 × 5-inch/38-caliber guns; 12 × 40 mm AA guns; 11 × 20 mm AA guns; 10 × 21 inch (533 mm) torpedo tubes; 6 × depth charge projectors; 2 × depth charge tracks

USS Robert H. McCard (DD-822) was a Gearing-class destroyer of the United States Navy, named for United States Marine Corps Gunnery Sergeant Robert H. McCard (1918–1944), who was posthumously awarded the Medal of Honor for conspicuous gallantry during the Battle of Saipan.

== Construction ==
Robert H. McCard was laid down by Consolidated Steel Corporation, Orange, Texas, on 20 June 1945; launched on 9 November 1945; sponsored by Mrs. Robert H. McCard; and commissioned on 23 October 1946.

== Service history ==
=== 1946–1958 ===
Following shakedown off Guantanamo Bay, Cuba, Robert H. McCard joined Destroyer Squadron 10 (Desron 10) and was homeported in Newport, Rhode Island. She operated out of Newport until 1955 on the standard employment schedule for destroyers in the Atlantic Fleet. McCard was a unit of the 6th Fleet on eight tours of duty in the Mediterranean and also participated in two midshipman cruises, visiting Caribbean, Canadian, Belgian, and Portuguese ports. Between deployments, the ship had four overhauls in the Boston Naval Shipyard, each being followed by a refresher training period under the supervision of the Fleet Training Group, Guantanamo Bay, Cuba.

In December 1955, Robert H. McCard became a unit of Destroyer Squadron 4, with her homeport in Norfolk, Virginia. Making a ninth and tenth tour of duty with the 6th Fleet, she operated as a unit of the Middle East Force in the Persian Gulf for a month during the ninth tour. Following plane guard duties and type training exercises off the Atlantic Coast, McCard participated in a midshipman cruise in June and July 1958, calling at Portuguese, Danish and Belgian ports.

=== 1959–1966 ===
Returning to type training exercises, an Atlantic Fleet exercise in the Caribbean, Fleet Sonar School duty, and an overhaul, Robert H. McCard's homeport was then changed to Naval Station Charleston, South Carolina. She operated out of Charleston until departing on 6 September 1960 for a NATO exercise, followed by other exercises. From 29 January 1961 to 3 February, she participated in recovery operations for Project Mercury, then departed Charleston on 8 March to join the 6th Fleet. In July she proceeded through the Suez Canal and reported to Commander, Middle East Force, for a six-week patrol of the Red Sea and Persian Gulf area. She returned to Charleston via the Mediterranean on 4 October.

Following plane guard duties and type training exercises, Robert H. McCard underwent Fleet Rehabilitation and Modernization (FRAM I) overhaul at Boston. Under FRAM I, McCard was completely torn down and rebuilt from the hull up, including new engines, a much larger combat information center, and a new sonar and radar systems. The 21-inch torpedo tubes between the funnels were removed, and an 8-round ASROC launcher placed there instead. All 3-inch/50 cal gun mounts, 40mm and 20mm gun mounts were removed, and the after superstructure was used for a hangar and flight deck for the QH-50 Drone Antisubmarine Helicopter (DASH). All depth charge systems were also removed and two new triple Mark 32 torpedo tubes for the 12.75-inch Mk44 torpedo were also placed just behind the rear funnel. This modernization was designed to extend the life of the destroyer by at least eight years.

For 13 days, beginning on 14 October 1962, she was part of the Cuban Missile blockade. Returning to Charleston on 3 January 1963, for refresher training during which she searched for the hijacked Venezuelan ship Anzoategui, the destroyer then served for two weeks as school ship for the Fleet Sonar School. She next participated in a joint Canadian-United States exercise. McCard was deployed with the 6th Fleet from 13 October 1963 to 5 March 1964 and deployed again on 5 January 1965. In February and March she operated under the Middle East Force, returning to Charleston via the Mediterranean on 7 June.

Following further operations off the Atlantic Coast and an overhaul period, Robert H. McCard underwent refresher training off Guantanamo Bay then conducted two midshipman cruises, the latter taking her to Wilhelmshaven, Germany. From 29 September 1966 to 31 January 1967, McCard was deployed to the 6th Fleet.

=== 1967–1972 ===
Operating in the western Atlantic, the Gulf of Mexico, and the Caribbean until 5 November, Robert H. McCard then transited the Panama Canal and joined the Pacific Fleet. At the end of 1967, she was serving on "Yankee Station" in the Gulf of Tonkin. In January and February 1968, she was on plane guard duty for Coral Sea (CV-43) in the Tonkin Gulf, participating in an emergency search and rescue mission on the east coast of Hainan Island. In March she served as plane guard for Kitty Hawk (CVA-63) and Bon Homme Richard (CVA-31) in the Tonkin Gulf. In April she provided naval gunfire support off South Vietnam, and on 10 May she departed Japan for return to the east coast of the United States and reassignment back to the Atlantic Fleet with a homeport at Naval Station Charleston, South Carolina.

Operating in NATO exercise "Silvertower" in the North Atlantic in September and October 1968, Robert H. McCard then put into port at Southampton. Following overhaul at Charleston from December to April 1969, she operated off the Atlantic Coast and in the Caribbean until deploying to the Mediterranean in September. She returned to Charleston from her six months with the 6th Fleet on 28 March 1970, and remained with the Atlantic Fleet for the duration of 1970 and four months of 1971. On 15 April 1971, she sailed eastward from Charleston for another six months' service in the Mediterranean, returning on 16 October. She stayed in Charleston for the remainder of 1971 and spent the first eight months of 1972 engaged in Atlantic and Caribbean operations.

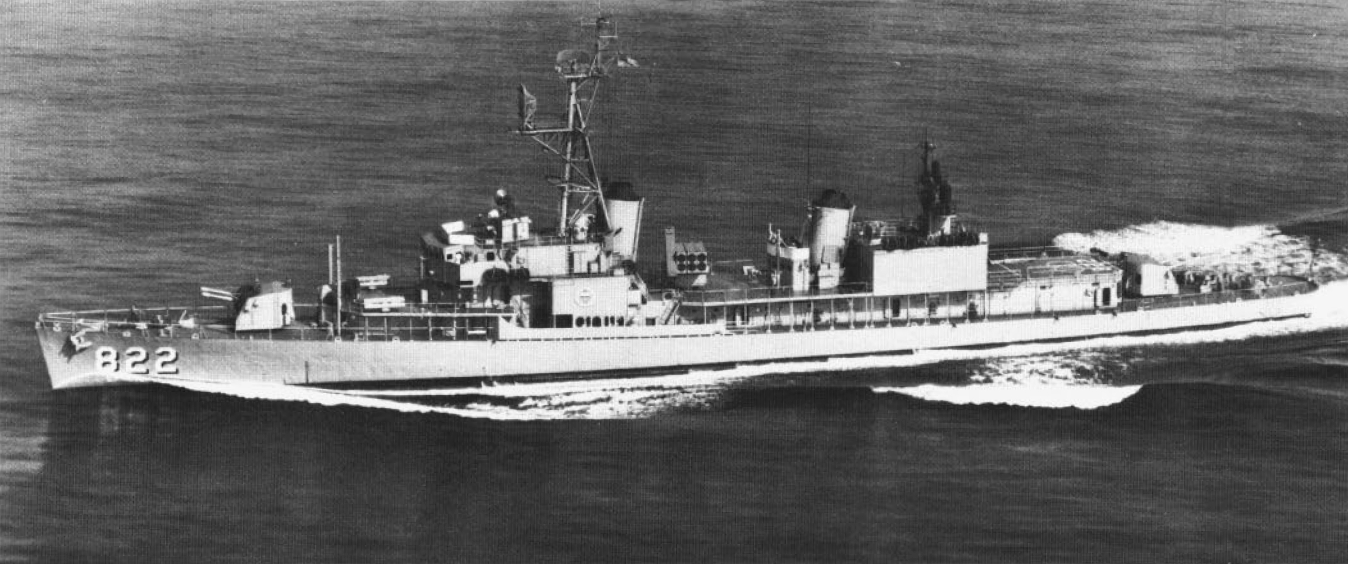
Robert H. McCard underway, circa 1978.

Robert H. McCard entered NAVSTA Charleston on 6 September 1972 for a six-month overhaul, at the completion of which she returned to normal operations in the western Atlantic and Caribbean.

=== 1973–1980 ===
Transferred to Naval Surface Reserve Force (NAVSURFRESFOR), Robert H. McCard shifted its homeport to Tampa, Florida, where it served as a Naval Reserve training ship berthed adjacent to Naval Reserve Center Tampa. In this capacity, McCard had a crew of approximately 2/3 active duty Regular Navy and full-time active duty Training and Administration of the Reserve (TAR) officers, chiefs and enlisted sailors, and 1/3 part-time Selected Reserve (SELRES) personnel. For the next seven years, McCard would conduct weekday training and upkeep pierside, followed by weekend underway periods in the Gulf of Mexico and annual extended duration training and operational support cruises in the Gulf of Mexico, the Caribbean and the Western Atlantic.

== TCG Kılıç Ali Paşa (D349) ==
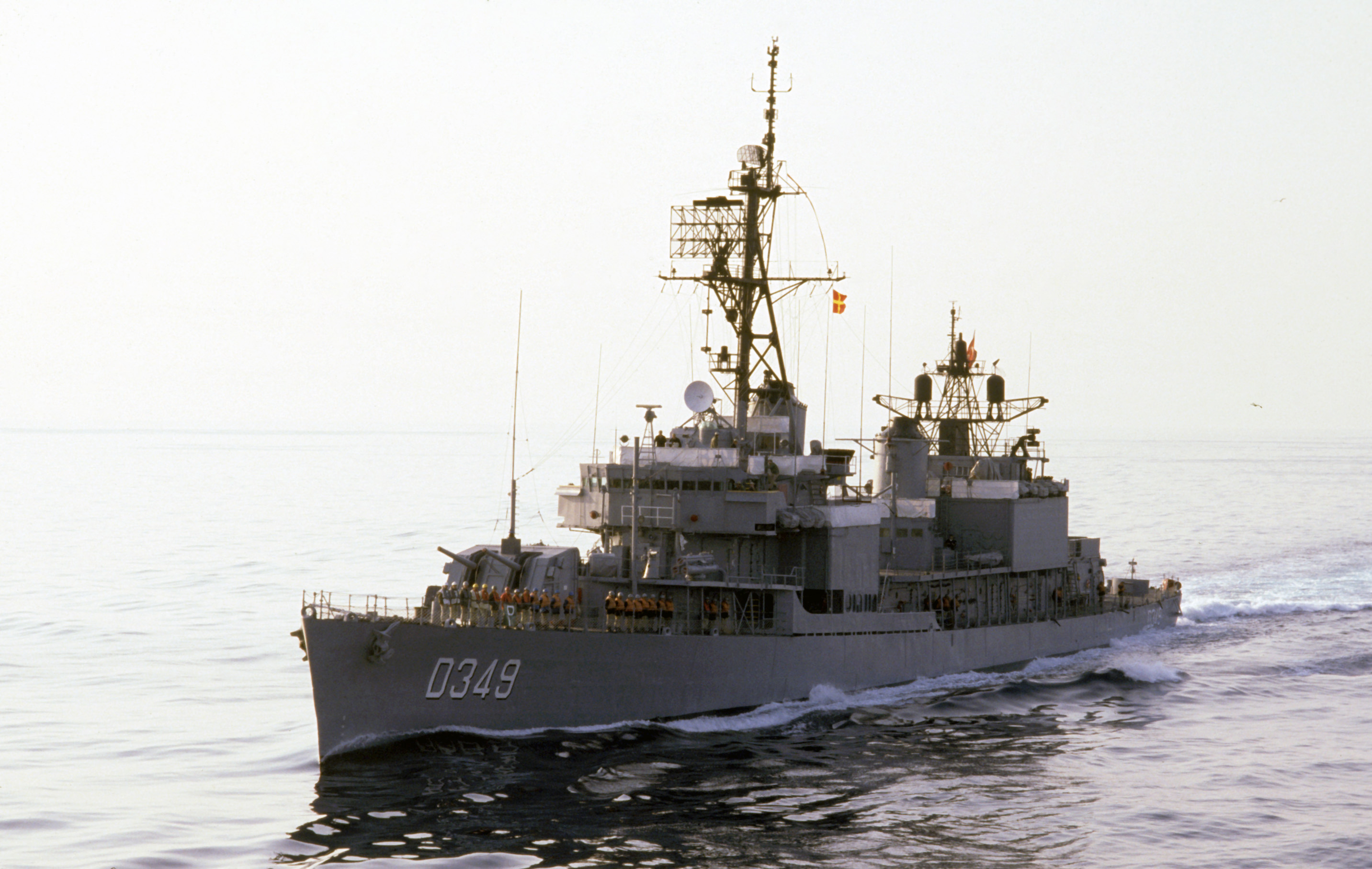
TCG Kılıç Ali Paşa (D-349) underway, circa 1986.

Robert H. McCard was decommissioned on 5 June 1980 at Tampa, Florida and transferred to the Republic of Turkey through the Security Assistance Program (SAP) that same day. She served with the Turkish Navy as TCG Kılıç Ali Paşa (D349), named after Kılıç Ali Paşa, an Italian-born grand admiral of the Ottoman Navy (1571–87). Removed from service in 1998, the ship was scrapped in 2000 at Aliağa, Turkey.
