= TCG Bozcaada =

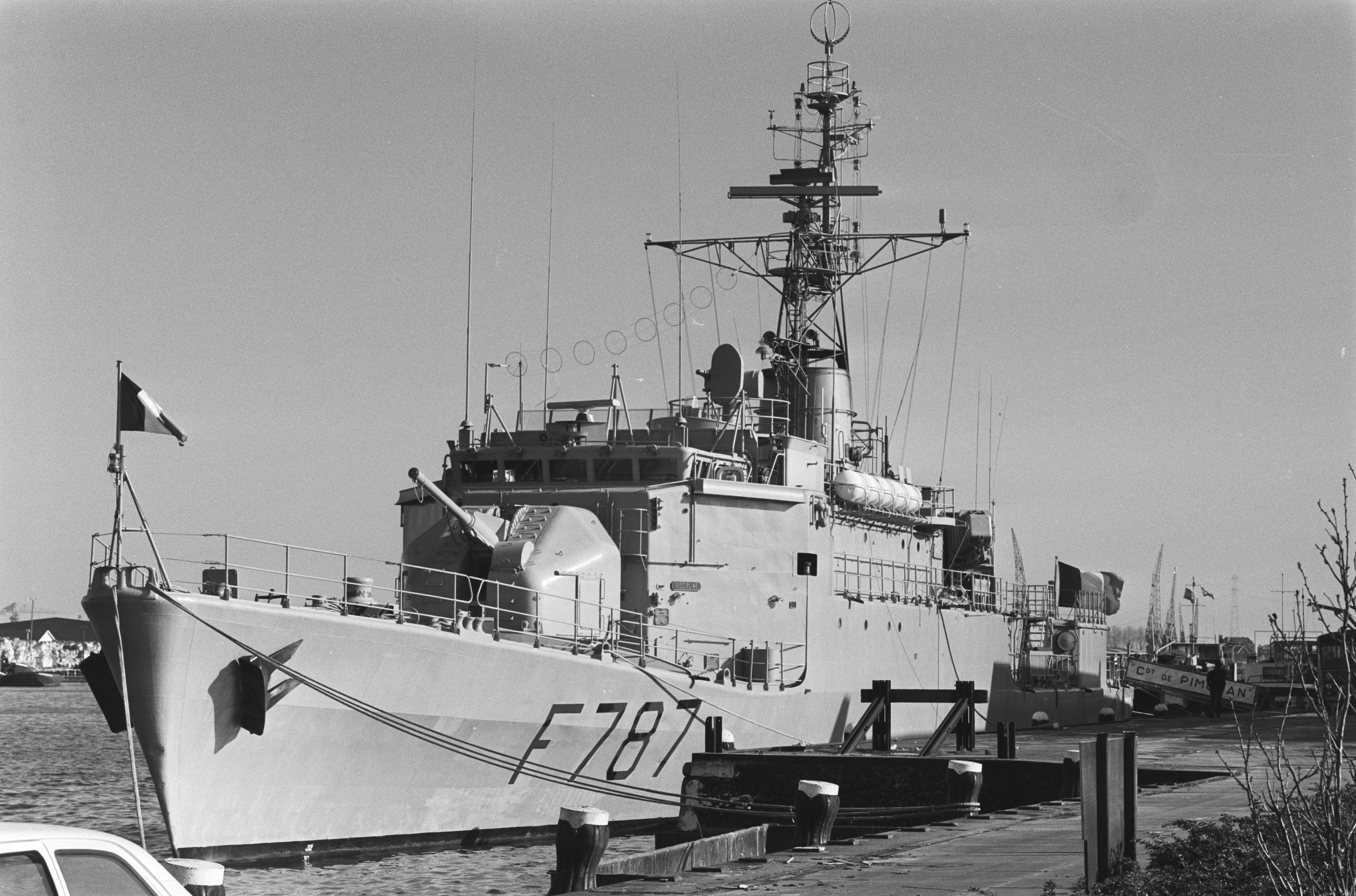
- Commandant de Pimodan

History

France
- Name: Commandant de Pimodan
- Namesake: Henri de Pimodan
- Laid down: 1977
- Launched: 20 May 1978
- Decommissioned: 28 July 2000
- Identification: F787
- Fate: Sold to Turkish Navy, 2000

Turkey
- Name: Bozcaada
- Namesake: Bozcaada
- Acquired: 2000
- In service: 2000
- Out of service: 2026
- Identification: F-500
- Status: Retired

General characteristics
- Class & type: Burak-class corvette
- Displacement: 1,100 tonnes
- Length: 80 m (260 ft)
- Beam: 10.3 m (34 ft)
- Draft: 5.3 m (17 ft)
- Propulsion: Engines : 2 diesel SEMT Pielstick 12PC2V400; Power: 12,000 shp (8.9 MW); Propellers: 2 4-bladed orientable propellers; Electrical power: 840 kW (2 DA x 320 + 1 DA x 200)
- Speed: 24 knots (44 km/h; 28 mph)
- Range: 4,500 nautical miles (8,330 km) at 15 knots (28 km/h; 17 mph)
- Complement: 104 including 10 officers, 46 petty officers, 9 specials, 39 enlisted
- Electronic warfare & decoys: 1 × Thale DRBV-51A air/surface search radar; 1 × Thale DRBC-32E fire control radar; 1 × Decca 1226 navigation radar
- Armament: 2 × Exocet MM38 missiles; 1 × 100 mm CADAM turret with Najir fire control system; 2 × 20 mm F2; 4 × 12.7 mm machine guns; 4 × L3 or L5 torpedoes; 1 × 375 mm rocket launcher

TCG Bozcaada (F-500) was the lead ship of the six Burak-class ASW corvettes of the Turkish Navy. She was named after Bozcaada Island, which is in the northern part of the Aegean Sea. Bozcaada was an ex-D'Estienne d'Orves-class A69 type aviso.

== Service history ==
The ship was built in 1978 in France and served as Commandant de Pimodan with the identification number F787 in the French Navy. She was transferred to the Turkish Navy in 2000.

On 2 August 2012, she was tasked to escort the Turkish cargo vessel MV Dadalı on the first leg of her voyage to Somalia from Port of Mersin to Suez Port in eastern Mediterranean Sea. The cargo ship carried aid materials dispatched by the Turkish Red Crescent to Somalia, which was drought-stricken as a result of the 2011 East Africa drought. Dadalı was escorted following her passage after Suez Canal by TCG Gemlik. She was withdrawn from service in 2026.
