= Tınaztepe-class destroyer =

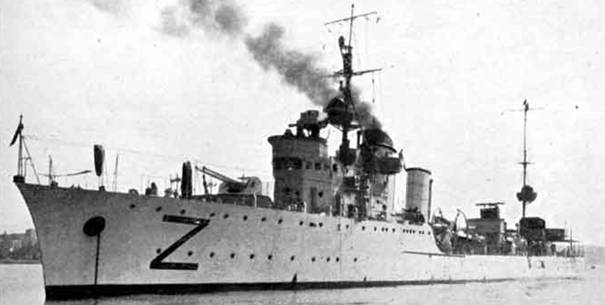
- Turkish destroyer TCG Zafer

Class overview
- Name: Tınaztepe class
- Builders: C.T. Riva Trigoso, Sestri Levante, Italy
- Operators: Turkish Navy
- Preceded by: Adatepe class
- Built: 1930-32
- In commission: 1931-54
- Completed: 2
- Retired: 2
- Scrapped: 2

General characteristics
- Type: Destroyer
- Displacement: 1225 tonnes standard, 1635 tonnes full load
- Length: 96 m (315 ft)
- Beam: 9.3 m (31 ft)
- Draught: 3.28 m (10.8 ft)
- Propulsion: 2 shaft Parsons geared steam turbines, 3 Thornycroft type boilers, 35,000 hp (26,100 kW)
- Speed: 36 kn (67 km/h; 41 mph)
- Range: 3,500 nmi (6,500 km; 4,000 mi) at 15 kn (28 km/h; 17 mph)
- Complement: 149
- Armament: 4 x 120 mm (4.7 in) guns (2x2); 3 x 40 mm AA guns; 2 x 20 mm Oerlikon guns; 6 x 533mm torpedo tubes (2x3)

The Tinaztepe class were two destroyers built in Italy for the Turkish Navy in the 1930s.

These ships were versions of the contemporary Italian Folgore-class destroyer or Freccia-class destroyer and were purchased while being built for the Italian Navy. In contrast with other Italian destroyers built for export, they had their main armament mounted in two twin turrets.

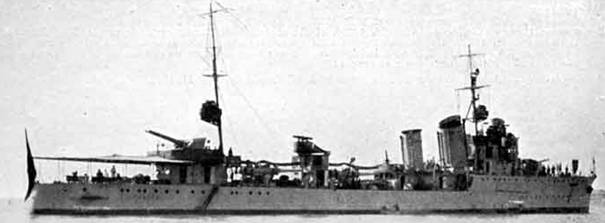
TCG Tınaztepe

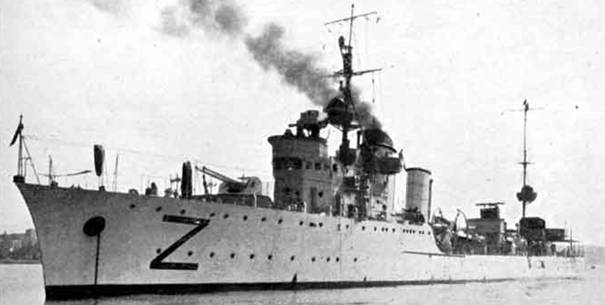
TCG Zafer

== Ships ==
Name	Builder	Launched	Commissioned	Decommissioned
Tınaztepe	C.T. Riva Trigoso, Riva Trigoso	27 July 1931	6 June 1932	February 1954
Zafer	C.T. Riva Trigoso, Riva Trigoso	30 September 1931	6 June 1932	February 1954
