= William Berners =

William Berners may refer to:

- William Barne (disambiguation)
- William Berners (1679–1712), MP for Hythe
- William Berners (property developer) (1709–1783), English property developer and slave owner
