= TCG Zafer =

TCG Zafer is the name of the following ships of the Turkish Navy:

- TCG Zafer (D 356), ex-USS Hugh Purvis, an Allen M. Sumner-class destroyer acquired in 1972, stricken in 1993
- TCG Zafer (F 253), ex-USS Thomas C. Hart, a Knox-class frigate acquired in 1993, stricken in 2016

== See also ==
- Zafer (disambiguation)
