= French aviso Amyot d'Inville =

D'Estienne d'Orves-class aviso of the French Navy

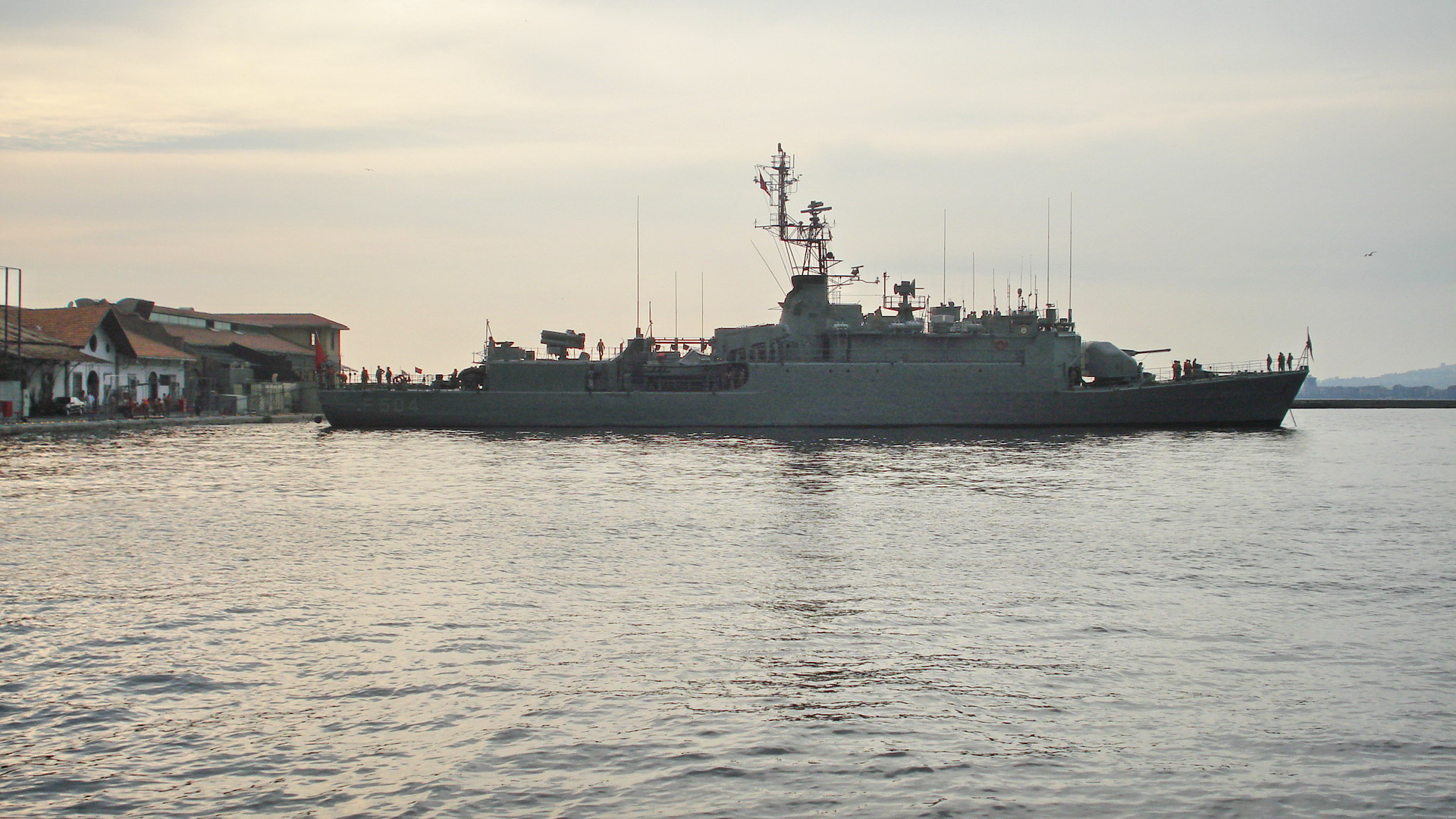
- TCG Bartın (F-504)

History

France
- Name: Amyot d'Inville
- Namesake: Hubert Amyot D'Inville
- Builder: Arsenal de Lorient, Lorient
- Laid down: 1 September 1973
- Launched: 30 November 1974
- Commissioned: 13 October 1976
- Decommissioned: 1999
- Identification: Callsign: FAOB; Pennant number: F782
- Fate: Sold to Turkey, November 2000

Turkey
- Name: Bartın
- Namesake: Bartın
- Acquired: 3 June 2002
- Commissioned: 26 June 2002
- Identification: Pennant number: F-504
- Status: Active

General characteristics
- Class & type: Burak-class corvette
- Displacement: 1,100 t (1,100 long tons) standard; 1,270 t (1,250 long tons) full load
- Length: 80 m (262 ft 6 in) oa; 76 m (249 ft 4 in) pp
- Beam: 10.3 m (33 ft 10 in)
- Draught: 5.3 m (17 ft 5 in)
- Propulsion: 2 SEMT Pielstick 12 PC 2 V400 diesel engines; 8,900 kW (12,000 bhp), 2 shafts
- Speed: 23.5 knots (43.5 km/h; 27.0 mph)
- Range: 4,500 nmi (8,300 km; 5,200 mi) at 15 knots (28 km/h; 17 mph)
- Complement: 90
- Sensors & processing systems: 1 Air/surface DRBV 51A sentry radar; 1 DRBC 32E fire control radar; 1 Decca 1226 navigation radar; 1 DUBA 25 hull sonar
- Electronic warfare & decoys: 1 ARBR 16 radar interceptor; 2 Dagaie decoy launchers; 1 SLQ-25 Nixie countermeasure system
- Armament: 2 Exocet MM38 SSMs (removed from French ships when reclassified as OPVs); 1 × 100 mm CADAM gun turret with Najir fire control system and CMS LYNCEA; 2 × 20 mm modèle F2 guns; 4 × 12.7 mm machine guns; 4 × L3 or L5 type torpedoes in four fixed catapults (removed from French ships when reclassified as OPVs); 1 × sextuple Bofors 375 mm rocket launcher (removed from French ships when reclassified as OPVs)

Amyot d'Inville (F782) was a D'Estienne d'Orves-class aviso in the French Navy. She was later transferred to the Turkish Navy as Burak-class corvette TCG Bartın (F-504).

== Design ==
Armed by a crew of 90 sailors, these vessels have the reputation of being among the most difficult in bad weather. Their high windage makes them particularly sensitive to pitch and roll as soon as the sea is formed.

Their armament, consequent for a vessel of this tonnage, allows them to manage a large spectrum of missions. During the Cold War, they were primarily used to patrol the continental shelf of the Atlantic Ocean in search of Soviet Navy submarines. Due to the poor performance of the hull sonar, as soon as an echo appeared, the reinforcement of an ASM frigate was necessary to chase it using its towed variable depth sonar.

Their role as patrollers now consists mainly of patrols and assistance missions, as well as participation in UN missions (blockades, flag checks) or similar marine policing tasks (fight against drugs, extraction of nationals, fisheries control, etc.). The mer-mer 38 or mer-mer 40 missiles have been landed, but they carry several machine guns and machine guns, more suited to their new missions.

Its construction cost was estimated at 270,000,000 French francs.

== Construction and career ==
=== Service in the French Navy ===
Amyot d'Inville was laid down on 1 September 1973 at Arsenal de Lorient, Lorient, launched on 30 November 1974, and commissioned on 13 October 1976.

She was first transferred to Brest to the 2nd D.I.V.A.V.I, in 1982 she joined the 1st D.I.V.A.V.I in Cherbourg.

In 1987, she carried out a mission in the Antilles-Guyana then was assigned to fisheries control in Newfoundland.

In 1992, she joined the G.A.S.M in Brest and carried out various missions in West Africa. In 1999, she left for the Antilles-Guyana area and again for West Africa for her final cruise.

=== Service in the Turkish Naval Forces ===
She was purchased from France in November 2000 and arrived in Turkey on 3 June 2002, after salvage work was carried out at DCN. She was then commissioned on the 26th later that month as TCG Bartın (F-504).

On 27 March 2018, she transited Bosporus towards the Black Sea to join Deniz Yıldızı-2018 naval exercise.
