= French aviso Second-Maître Le Bihan =

D'Estienne d'Orves-class aviso of the French Navy

History

France
- Name: Second-Maître Le Bihan
- Namesake: Marcel Pierre Marie Le Bihan
- Builder: Arsenal de Lorient, Lorient
- Laid down: 1 November 1976
- Launched: 13 August 1977
- Commissioned: 7 July 1979
- Decommissioned: 2002
- Identification: Callsign: FABH; Pennant number: F788
- Fate: Sold to Turkey, 2002

Turkey
- Name: Bafra
- Namesake: Bafra
- Acquired: 26 June 2002
- Commissioned: 24 July 2002
- Identification: Pennant number: F-505
- Status: Active

General characteristics
- Class & type: Burak-class corvette
- Displacement: 1,100 t (1,100 long tons) standard; 1,270 t (1,250 long tons) full load
- Length: 80 m (262 ft 6 in) oa; 76 m (249 ft 4 in) pp
- Beam: 10.3 m (33 ft 10 in)
- Draught: 5.3 m (17 ft 5 in)
- Propulsion: 2 SEMT Pielstick 12 PC 2 V400 diesel engines; 8,900 kW (12,000 bhp), 2 shafts
- Speed: 23.5 knots (43.5 km/h; 27.0 mph)
- Range: 4,500 nmi (8,300 km; 5,200 mi) at 15 knots (28 km/h; 17 mph)
- Complement: 90
- Sensors & processing systems: 1 Air/surface DRBV 51A sentry radar; 1 DRBC 32E fire control radar; 1 Decca 1226 navigation radar; 1 DUBA 25 hull sonar
- Electronic warfare & decoys: 1 ARBR 16 radar interceptor; 2 Dagaie decoy launchers; 1 SLQ-25 Nixie countermeasure system
- Armament: 2 Exocet MM38 SSMs (removed from French ships when reclassified as OPVs); 1 × 100 mm CADAM gun turret with Najir fire control system and CMS LYNCEA; 2 × 20 mm modèle F2 guns; 4 × 12.7 mm machine guns; 4 × L3 or L5 type torpedoes in four fixed catapults (removed from French ships when reclassified as OPVs); 1 × sextuple Bofors 375 mm rocket launcher (removed from French ships when reclassified as OPVs)

Second-Maître Le Bihan (F788) was a D'Estienne d'Orves-class aviso in the French Navy. She was later transferred to the Turkish Navy as Burak-class corvette TCG Bafra (F-505).

== Design ==
With a crew of 90 sailors, these vessels have the reputation of being among the most difficult in bad weather. Their high windage makes them particularly sensitive to pitch and roll as soon as the sea is formed.

Their armament, consequent for a vessel of this tonnage, allows them to manage a large spectrum of missions. During the Cold War, they were primarily used to patrol the continental shelf of the Atlantic Ocean in search of Soviet Navy submarines. Due to the poor performance of the hull sonar, as soon as an echo appeared, the dispatch of an Anti-Submarine Warfare frigate was necessary to chase it using its towed variable depth sonar.

Their role as patrollers now consists mainly of patrols and assistance missions, as well as participation in UN missions (blockades, flag checks) or similar marine policing tasks (fight against drugs, extraction of nationals, fisheries control, etc.). The MM38 or MM40 Exocet missiles have been landed, but they carry several machine guns, more suited to their new missions.

Its construction cost was estimated at 270,000,000 French francs.

== Construction and career ==
=== Service in the French Navy ===
Second-Maître Le Bihan was laid down on 1 November 1976 at Arsenal de Lorient, Lorient, Launched on 13 August 1977, and commissioned on 7 July 1979.

=== Service in the Turkish Naval Forces ===
The ship was purchased from France in 2002 and acquired, after arriving in Turkey, on 26 June 2002, after salvage work was carried out at DCN. She was later commissioned on 24 July of the same year as TCG Bafra (F-505).
