= French aviso D'Estienne d'Orves =

D'Estienne d'Orves-class aviso of the French Navy

History

France
- Name: D'Estienne d'Orves
- Namesake: Henri Honoré d'Estienne d'Orves
- Builder: Arsenal de Lorient, Lorient
- Laid down: 1 September 1972
- Launched: 1 June 1973
- Commissioned: 10 September 1976
- Decommissioned: 1999
- Identification: Callsign: FAZB; Pennant number: F781
- Fate: Sold to Turkey, 2002

Turkey
- Name: Beykoz
- Namesake: Beykoz
- Acquired: 26 June 2002
- Commissioned: 2002
- Identification: Pennant number: F-503
- Status: Active

General characteristics
- Class & type: Burak-class corvette (currently used as a weapons testing ship)
- Displacement: 1,100 t (1,100 long tons) standard; 1,270 t (1,250 long tons) full load
- Length: 80 m (262 ft 6 in) oa; 76 m (249 ft 4 in) pp
- Beam: 10.3 m (33 ft 10 in)
- Draught: 5.3 m (17 ft 5 in)
- Propulsion: 2 SEMT Pielstick 12 PC 2 V400 diesel engines; 8,900 kW (12,000 bhp), 2 shafts
- Speed: 23.5 knots (43.5 km/h; 27.0 mph)
- Range: 4,500 nmi (8,300 km; 5,200 mi) at 15 knots (28 km/h; 17 mph)
- Complement: 90
- Sensors & processing systems: 1 Air/surface DRBV 51A sentry radar; 1 DRBC 32E fire control radar; 1 Decca 1226 navigation radar; 1 DUBA 25 hull sonar
- Electronic warfare & decoys: 1 ARBR 16 radar interceptor; 2 Dagaie decoy launchers; 1 SLQ-25 Nixie countermeasure system
- Armament: 1 × 100 mm CADAM gun turret with Najir fire control system and CMS LYNCEA; 2 × 20 mm modèle F2 guns; 4 × 12.7 mm machine guns; 2 Exocet MM38 SSMs (removed from French ships when reclassified as OPVs); 4 × L3 or L5 type torpedoes in four fixed catapults (removed from French ships when reclassified as OPVs); 1 × sextuple Bofors 375 mm rocket launcher (removed from French ships when reclassified as OPVs); Weapons tested: MKE 76 mm/62-caliber gun; GÖKSUR SAM-based CIWS; Levent SAM-based CIWS

D'Estienne d'Orves (F781) is the lead ship of the D'Estienne d'Orves-class aviso. She was used by the French Navy. She was later transferred to the Turkish Navy as TCG Beykoz (F-503). The ship is now being used as a testing platform for the Turkish indigenous-built naval weapons.

== Design ==
Armed by a crew of 90 sailors, these vessels have the reputation of being among the most difficult in bad weather. Their high windage makes them particularly sensitive to pitch and roll as soon as the sea is formed.

Their armament, consequent for a vessel of this tonnage, allows them to manage a large spectrum of missions. During the Cold War, they were primarily used to patrol the continental shelf of the Atlantic Ocean in search of Soviet Navy submarines. Due to the poor performance of the hull sonar, as soon as an echo appeared, the reinforcement of an ASM frigate was necessary to chase it using its towed variable depth sonar.

Their role as patrollers now consists mainly of patrols and assistance missions, as well as participation in UN missions (blockades, flag checks) or similar marine policing tasks (fight against drugs, extraction of nationals, fisheries control, etc.). The mer-mer 38 or mer-mer 40 missiles have been landed, but they carry several machine guns and machine guns, more suited to their new missions.

Its construction cost was estimated at 270,000,000 French francs.

== Construction and career ==
=== Service in the French Navy ===
D'Estienne d'Orves was laid down on 1 September 1972 at Arsenal de Lorient, Lorient, Launched on 1 June 1973, and commissioned on 10 September 1976.

=== Service in the Turkish Naval Forces ===
The ship was purchased from France in 2002 and acquired, after arriving in Turkey, on 26 June 2002 after salvage work was carried out at DCN. She was later commissioned in the same year as TCG Beykoz (F-503). She was reported to have been converted to a testing and training role with the Turkish Navy as of 2024.
