= Bernières-d'Ailly =

- Commune
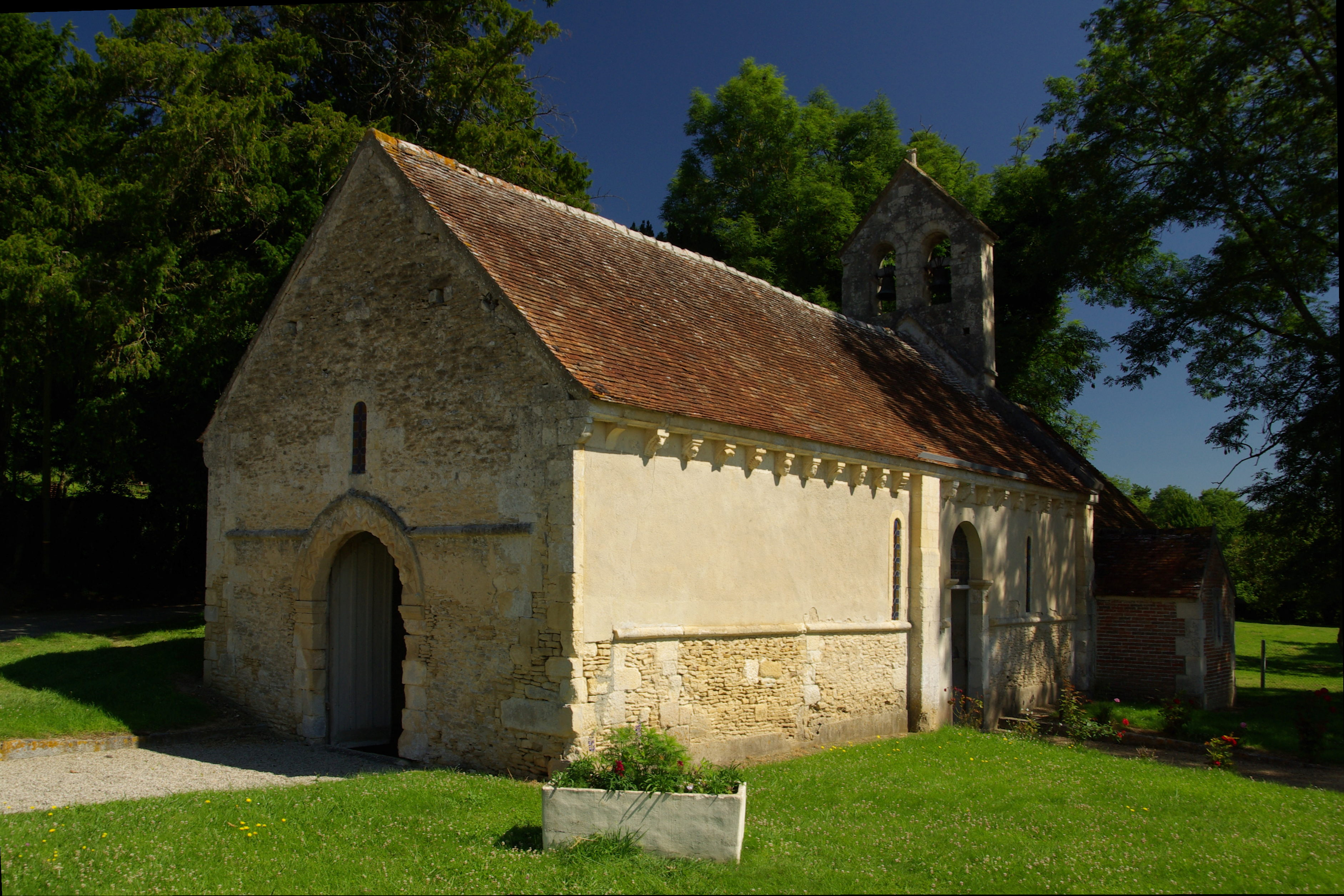
- The chapel of Saint Anne

- Coat of arms
- Location of Bernières-d'Ailly
- Location within France Location within Normandy
- Coordinates: 48°57′45″N 0°05′18″W
- Country: France
- Region: Normandy
- Department: Calvados
- Arrondissement: Caen
- Canton: Falaise
- Intercommunality: Pays de Falaise

Government
  - Mayor (2020–2026): Marie-Anne Hinard
- Area^{1}: 9.39 km^{2} (3.63 sq mi)
- Elevation: 44 m (144 ft)
- Highest elevation: 137 m (449 ft)
- Lowest elevation: 34 m (112 ft)
- Population (2023): 222
  - Density: 23.6/km^{2} (61.2/sq mi)
- Time zone: UTC+01:00 (CET)
  - Summer (DST): UTC+02:00 (CEST)
- INSEE/Postal code: 14064 /14170
- ^{1} French Land Register data, which excludes lakes, ponds, glaciers > 1 km^{2} (0.386 sq mi or 247 acres) and river estuaries.

Bernières-d'Ailly (French pronunciation: [bɛʁnjɛʁ daji]) is a commune in the Calvados department in the Normandy region in northwestern France.

== Geography ==
The commune is made up of the following collection of villages and hamlets, Bernières and Ailly.

The Dives is the only river running through the commune.

== Population ==
Historical population
Year	Pop.	±% p.a.
1968	210	—
1975	182	−2.02%
1982	201	+1.43%
1990	229	+1.64%
1999	212	−0.85%
2007	247	+1.93%
2012	253	+0.48%
2017	243	−0.80%
2023	222	−1.50%
Source: INSEE

== Points of Interest ==
=== National Heritage sites ===
The Commune has three buildings and areas listed as a Monument historique

- Château à Bernières-d'Ailly a chateau built in 1751 that was listed as a monument in 1970.
- Former Saint-Gerbold church This former church is in the chateau grounds and was listed in 1970.
- Sainte-Anne Church is a fourteenth century church, that was listed in 1975.

== Notable people ==
- Bernard Anquetil - (1916–1941) a French Resistance and a Compagnon de la Libération was born here.

== See also ==
- Communes of the Calvados department
