= Adatepe-class destroyer =

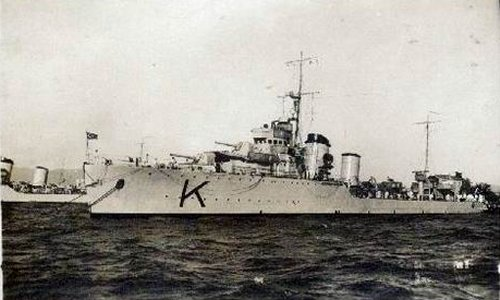
- Turkish Navy destroyer TCG Kocatepe

Class overview
- Name: Adatepe class
- Builders: Ansaldo, Sestri Ponente, Italy
- Operators: Turkish Navy
- Preceded by: Muavenet-i Milliye class
- Succeeded by: Tinaztepe class
- Built: 1930-31
- In commission: 1931-54
- Completed: 2
- Scrapped: 2

General characteristics
- Type: Destroyer
- Displacement: 1270 tonnes standard, 1676 tonnes full load
- Length: 100.2 m (329 ft)
- Beam: 9.37 m (30.7 ft)
- Draught: 2.9 m (9 ft 6 in)
- Propulsion: 2 shaft Parsons geared steam turbines, 3 Thornycroft type boilers, 40,000 hp (30,000 kW)
- Speed: 36 knots (67 km/h)
- Range: 3,500 nmi (6,500 km; 4,000 mi) at 15 knots (28 km/h)
- Complement: 149
- Armament: 4 x 120 mm (4.7 in) guns (4 × 1); 3 x 40 mm (1.6 in) AA guns; 6 x 533 mm (21 in) torpedo tubes (2 × 3)

The Adatepe class or Kocatepe class were two destroyers built for the Turkish Navy by the Italian company Ansaldo of Genoa in 1931.

These ships were the first part of the re-armament program for the Turkish Navy, which began after the end of the Greco-Turkish War & the establishment of the Republic of Turkey.

The Adatepe class were based on the contemporary Italian Folgore class but had guns mounted in single mountings rather than the twin turrets of the Italian ships. The hulls were lengthened to accommodate this change, and the ships had two funnels rather than the single funnel used by the Italian ships.

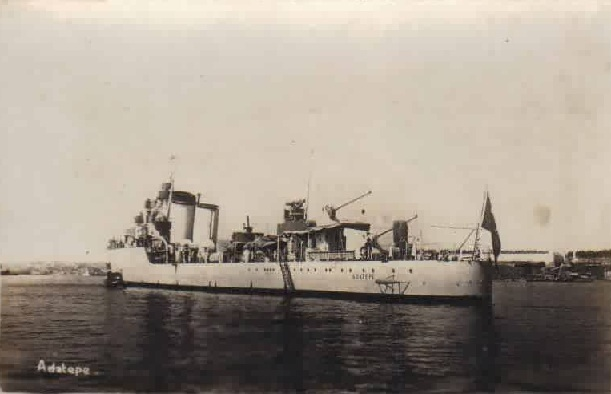
TCG Adatepe

== Ships ==
Name	Builder	Launched	Commissioned	Decommissioned
Kocatepe	Ansaldo, Sestri Ponente	7 February 1931	18 October 1931	February 1954
Adatepe	Ansaldo, Sestri Ponente	19 March 1931	18 October 1931	February 1954
