= Standing NATO Maritime Group 1 =

Immediate reaction military unit

- Active: 1968–present
- Allegiance: (NATO) North Atlantic Treaty Organization

Commanders
- Current commander: Commodore Maryla Ingham, Royal Navy

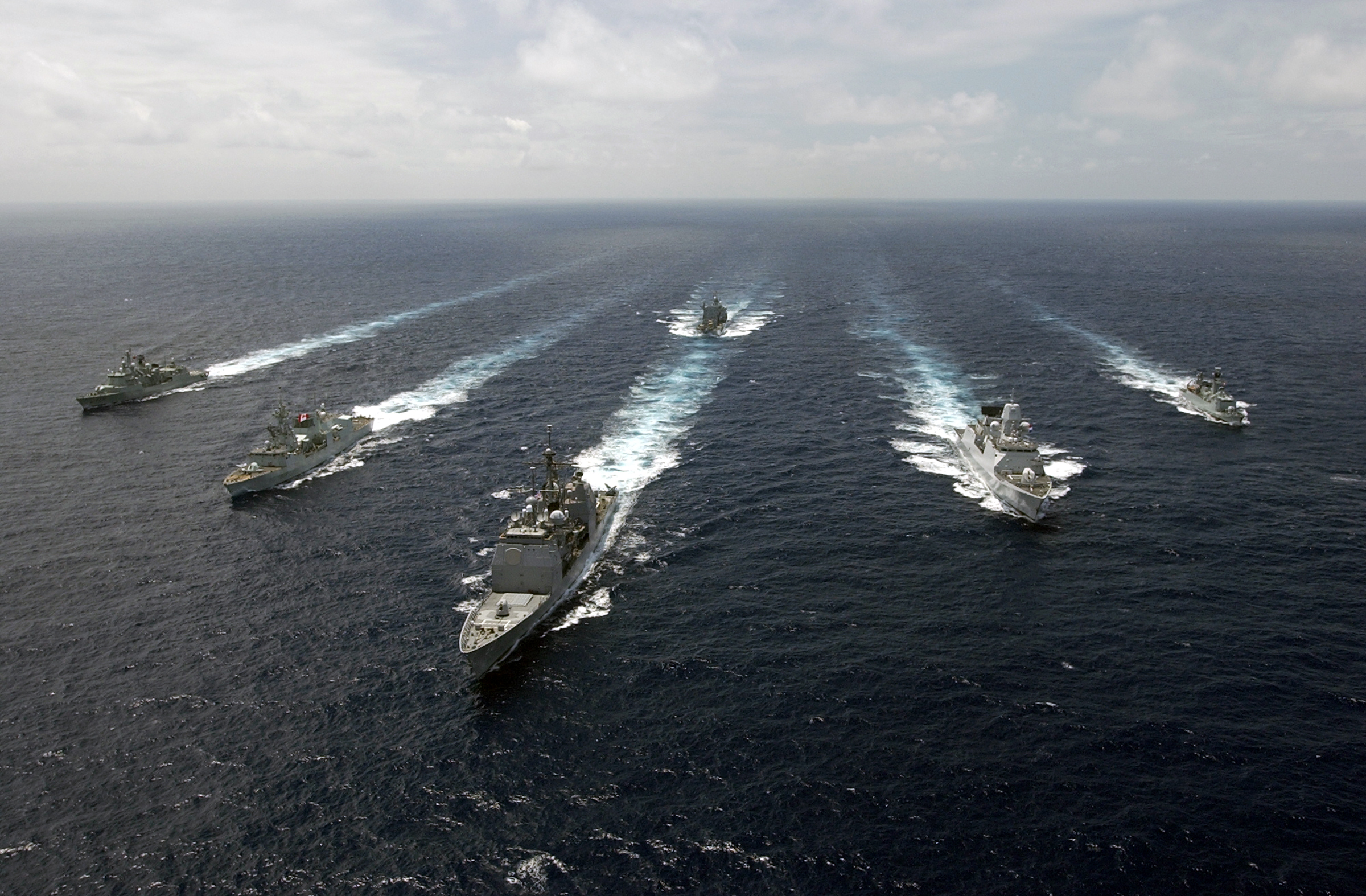
SNMG1 per 13 August 2007 in formation. From left to right: NRP Álvares Cabral - Portugal HMCS Toronto - Canada USS Normandy - United States Spessart - Germany HNLMS Evertsen - Netherlands HDMS Olfert Fischer - Denmark

Standing NATO Maritime Group One (SNMG1) is one of NATO's standing naval maritime immediate reaction forces. SNMG1 consists of four to six destroyers and frigates. Its role is to provide NATO with an immediate operational response capability.

== History ==
In late November 1966, U.S. Rear Admiral Richard G. Colbert prepared a concept paper proposing a permanent Allied Command Atlantic naval contingency force based on Operation Matchmaker, an annual six-month exercise involving ships from NATO navies. The proposed contingency force was approved by NATO in December 1967 and activated in January 1968 as Standing Naval Force Atlantic (STANAVFORLANT).

During the 1990s, STANAVFORLANT was heavily involved in Operation Maritime Monitor (July 1992 to November 1992), Operation Maritime Guard (November 1992 to June 1993) and Operation Sharp Guard (June 1993 to October 1996), the maritime embargo operations in the Adriatic Sea established to ensure compliance by Serbia and Montenegro with United Nations (UN) resolutions 713, 715, 787, 820 and 943. Between November 1992 and June 1996 some 74,000 ships were challenged, almost 6,000 were inspected at sea and more than 1,400 were diverted and inspected in port.

The force was under the operational control of SACLANT until SACLANT was decommissioned in 2003, when it was merged into NATO's Allied Command Operations (ACO).

The force was re-designated Standing NATO Maritime Group 1 in January 2005.

In September 2007, SNMG1 was in the Red Sea bound for Suez to complete a circumnavigation of Africa when the Jabal al-Tair volcano erupted. SNMG1 ships assisted the Yemeni coast guard in the recovery of their military personnel stationed on the island.

From March 2009 to June 2009 SNMG1 was deployed by NATO off the Somali coast to conduct Operation Allied Protector, to deter, defend and protect World Food Programme (WFP) vessels against the threat of piracy and armed robbery, thereby allowing WFP to fulfill its mission of providing humanitarian aid.

Since August 2009, SNMG1 has been providing ships for NATO's Operation Ocean Shield anti-piracy mission in the Gulf of Aden.

On 23–25 March 2012 the group conducted a passing exercise with Carrier Strike Group Twelve, led by USS Enterprise, while carrying out Operation Active Endeavor missions in the Mediterranean Sea. The group's commander, Commodore Ben Bekkering of the Royal Netherlands Navy, visited Enterprise. At the time, the group consisted of the Royal Netherlands Navy frigate De Ruyter, the Spanish Navy frigate Álvaro de Bazán, the German Navy frigate Rheinland-Pfalz, and the Royal Canadian Navy frigate Charlottetown.

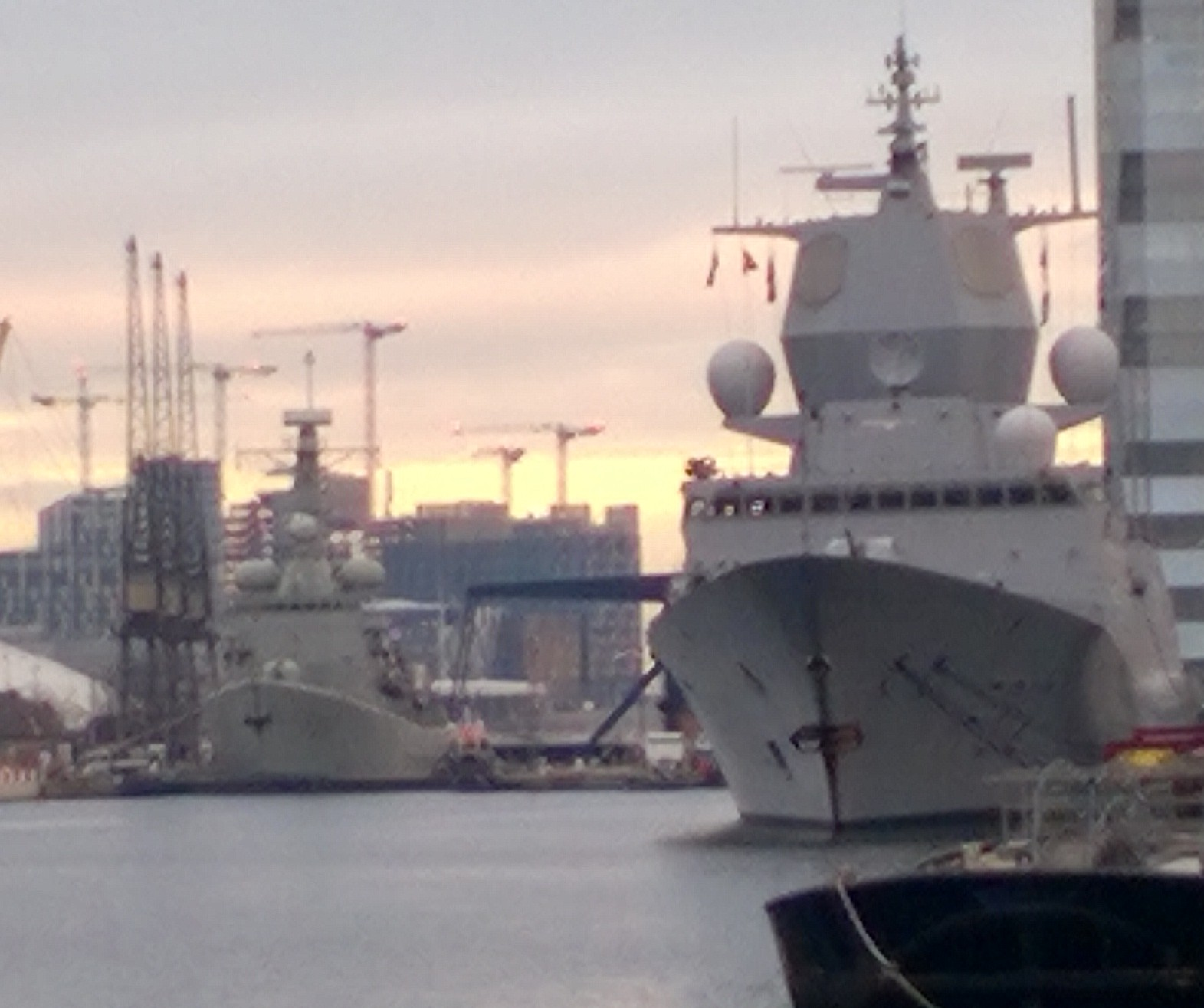
Otto Sverdrup and D. Francisco de Almeida during a visit to London in December 2017; both were attached to SNMG1

In November 2018, HNoMS Helge Ingstad of the Royal Norwegian Navy was operating with SNMG1 when she was involved in a collision with a Maltese-flagged tanker Sola TS and had to be deliberately run aground to prevent her sinking. The remainder of SNMG1 stood by to provide assistance.

During 2021, SNMG1 was active in the region of the Baltic Sea for 12 days.

== Current ships ==
In 2026, SNMG1 consisted of:

Previous flagship
Current flagship

Ships in bold are currently part of the naval force

Year	Commander	Ship	Type	Part of task force	Flagship
2026	(Netherlands); Commodore; Arjen S. Warnaar (January 1 – January 15) (Spain); Rear Admiral; Joaquin Ruiz Escagedo (January 15 – April 10) (United Kingdom); Commodore; Maryla Ingham (April 10 – August 20) (France); Rear Admiral; Nicolas Molitor (August 20 – ongoing)				
2026	(Netherlands); Commodore; Arjen S. Warnaar (January 1 – January 15) (Spain); Rear Admiral; Joaquin Ruiz Escagedo (January 15 – April 10) (United Kingdom); Commodore; Maryla Ingham (April 10 – August 20) (France); Rear Admiral; Nicolas Molitor (August 20 – ongoing)	(Netherlands) HNLMS Johan de Witt	Rotterdam-class landing platform dock	January 1 – January 15	January 1 – January 15
2026	(Netherlands); Commodore; Arjen S. Warnaar (January 1 – January 15) (Spain); Rear Admiral; Joaquin Ruiz Escagedo (January 15 – April 10) (United Kingdom); Commodore; Maryla Ingham (April 10 – August 20) (France); Rear Admiral; Nicolas Molitor (August 20 – ongoing)	(Spain) ESPS Almirante Juan de Borbón	Álvaro de Bazán-class frigate	January 15 – April 10	January 15 – April 10
2026	(Netherlands); Commodore; Arjen S. Warnaar (January 1 – January 15) (Spain); Rear Admiral; Joaquin Ruiz Escagedo (January 15 – April 10) (United Kingdom); Commodore; Maryla Ingham (April 10 – August 20) (France); Rear Admiral; Nicolas Molitor (August 20 – ongoing)	(Spain) SPS Patiño	Replenishment Oiler	Unknown - unknown	n/a
2026	(Netherlands); Commodore; Arjen S. Warnaar (January 1 – January 15) (Spain); Rear Admiral; Joaquin Ruiz Escagedo (January 15 – April 10) (United Kingdom); Commodore; Maryla Ingham (April 10 – August 20) (France); Rear Admiral; Nicolas Molitor (August 20 – ongoing)	(France) FS Commandant Blaison	D'Estienne d'Orves-class aviso	January 19 – March 14	n/a
2026	(Netherlands); Commodore; Arjen S. Warnaar (January 1 – January 15) (Spain); Rear Admiral; Joaquin Ruiz Escagedo (January 15 – April 10) (United Kingdom); Commodore; Maryla Ingham (April 10 – August 20) (France); Rear Admiral; Nicolas Molitor (August 20 – ongoing)	(Germany) FGS Sachsen	Sachsen-class frigate	April 10 – August 20	n/a
2026	(Netherlands); Commodore; Arjen S. Warnaar (January 1 – January 15) (Spain); Rear Admiral; Joaquin Ruiz Escagedo (January 15 – April 10) (United Kingdom); Commodore; Maryla Ingham (April 10 – August 20) (France); Rear Admiral; Nicolas Molitor (August 20 – ongoing)	(Netherlands) HNLMS Van Amstel	Karel Doorman-class frigate	Unknown – unknown	n/a
2026	(Netherlands); Commodore; Arjen S. Warnaar (January 1 – January 15) (Spain); Rear Admiral; Joaquin Ruiz Escagedo (January 15 – April 10) (United Kingdom); Commodore; Maryla Ingham (April 10 – August 20) (France); Rear Admiral; Nicolas Molitor (August 20 – ongoing)	(Portugal) **NRP Dom Francisco de Almeida**	Multi-purpose frigate	Unknown – ongoing	n/a
2026	(Netherlands); Commodore; Arjen S. Warnaar (January 1 – January 15) (Spain); Rear Admiral; Joaquin Ruiz Escagedo (January 15 – April 10) (United Kingdom); Commodore; Maryla Ingham (April 10 – August 20) (France); Rear Admiral; Nicolas Molitor (August 20 – ongoing)	(Norway) HNoMS Fridtjof Nansen	Fridtjof Nansen-class frigate	Unknown – unknown	n/a
2026	(Netherlands); Commodore; Arjen S. Warnaar (January 1 – January 15) (Spain); Rear Admiral; Joaquin Ruiz Escagedo (January 15 – April 10) (United Kingdom); Commodore; Maryla Ingham (April 10 – August 20) (France); Rear Admiral; Nicolas Molitor (August 20 – ongoing)	(Belgium) BNS Leopold I	Karel Doorman-class frigate	Unknown – unknown	n/a
2026	(Netherlands); Commodore; Arjen S. Warnaar (January 1 – January 15) (Spain); Rear Admiral; Joaquin Ruiz Escagedo (January 15 – April 10) (United Kingdom); Commodore; Maryla Ingham (April 10 – August 20) (France); Rear Admiral; Nicolas Molitor (August 20 – ongoing)	(France) BNS La Fayette	Stealth frigate	Unknown – unknown	n/a
2026	(Netherlands); Commodore; Arjen S. Warnaar (January 1 – January 15) (Spain); Rear Admiral; Joaquin Ruiz Escagedo (January 15 – April 10) (United Kingdom); Commodore; Maryla Ingham (April 10 – August 20) (France); Rear Admiral; Nicolas Molitor (August 20 – ongoing)	(France) FS Flamant	Flamant-class patrol vessel	Unknown – unknown	n/a
2026	(Netherlands); Commodore; Arjen S. Warnaar (January 1 – January 15) (Spain); Rear Admiral; Joaquin Ruiz Escagedo (January 15 – April 10) (United Kingdom); Commodore; Maryla Ingham (April 10 – August 20) (France); Rear Admiral; Nicolas Molitor (August 20 – ongoing)	(Turkey) TCG Oruçreis	Barbaros-class frigate	Unknown – unknown	n/a
2026	(Netherlands); Commodore; Arjen S. Warnaar (January 1 – January 15) (Spain); Rear Admiral; Joaquin Ruiz Escagedo (January 15 – April 10) (United Kingdom); Commodore; Maryla Ingham (April 10 – August 20) (France); Rear Admiral; Nicolas Molitor (August 20 – ongoing)	(Netherlands) HNLMS Den Helder	Replenishment oiler	Unknown – unknown	n/a
2026	(Netherlands); Commodore; Arjen S. Warnaar (January 1 – January 15) (Spain); Rear Admiral; Joaquin Ruiz Escagedo (January 15 – April 10) (United Kingdom); Commodore; Maryla Ingham (April 10 – August 20) (France); Rear Admiral; Nicolas Molitor (August 20 – ongoing)	(Canada) **HMCS Ville de Québec**	Halifax-class frigate	August 20 – ongoing	n/a
2026	(Netherlands); Commodore; Arjen S. Warnaar (January 1 – January 15) (Spain); Rear Admiral; Joaquin Ruiz Escagedo (January 15 – April 10) (United Kingdom); Commodore; Maryla Ingham (April 10 – August 20) (France); Rear Admiral; Nicolas Molitor (August 20 – ongoing)	(France) **FS Pluvier**	Flamant-class patrol vessel	Unknown – ongoing	n/a

== Previous task groups ==
In 2025, SNMG1 consisted of:

Previous flagship
Current flagship

Ships in bold are currently part of the naval force

Year	Commander	Ship	Type	Part of task force	Flagship
2025	(Denmark); Commodore; Thomas Stig Rasmussen (January 1 – January 9) (Netherlands); Commodore; Arjen S. Warnaar (January 9 – ongoing)				
2025	(Denmark); Commodore; Thomas Stig Rasmussen (January 1 – January 9) (Netherlands); Commodore; Arjen S. Warnaar (January 9 – ongoing)	(Netherlands) HNLMS Tromp	De Zeven Provinciën-class frigate	January 4 – May 28	January 4 – May
2025	(Denmark); Commodore; Thomas Stig Rasmussen (January 1 – January 9) (Netherlands); Commodore; Arjen S. Warnaar (January 9 – ongoing)	(Germany) FGS Rhön	Rhön-class tanker	March 19 – December 31	n/a
2025	(Denmark); Commodore; Thomas Stig Rasmussen (January 1 – January 9) (Netherlands); Commodore; Arjen S. Warnaar (January 9 – ongoing)	(Netherlands) HNLMS De Ruyter	De Zeven Provinciën-class frigate	May – September	May – September
2025	(Denmark); Commodore; Thomas Stig Rasmussen (January 1 – January 9) (Netherlands); Commodore; Arjen S. Warnaar (January 9 – ongoing)	(Sweden) HSwMS Nyköping	Visby-class corvette	June 27 – unknown	n/a
2025	(Denmark); Commodore; Thomas Stig Rasmussen (January 1 – January 9) (Netherlands); Commodore; Arjen S. Warnaar (January 9 – ongoing)	(Finland) FNS Pori	Hamina-class missile boat	July 1 – July 31	n/a
2025	(Denmark); Commodore; Thomas Stig Rasmussen (January 1 – January 9) (Netherlands); Commodore; Arjen S. Warnaar (January 9 – ongoing)	(Netherlands) HNLMS Van Amstel	Karel Doorman-class frigate	November 7 – December	November - December
2025	(Denmark); Commodore; Thomas Stig Rasmussen (January 1 – January 9) (Netherlands); Commodore; Arjen S. Warnaar (January 9 – ongoing)	(Netherlands) HNLMS Johan de Witt	Rotterdam-class landing platform dock	September – December 31	September – November
2025	(Denmark); Commodore; Thomas Stig Rasmussen (January 1 – January 9) (Netherlands); Commodore; Arjen S. Warnaar (January 9 – ongoing)	(Germany) FGS Braunschweig	Braunschweig-class corvette	Unknown – December 31	n/a
2025	(Denmark); Commodore; Thomas Stig Rasmussen (January 1 – January 9) (Netherlands); Commodore; Arjen S. Warnaar (January 9 – ongoing)	(Portugal) NRP Bartolomeu Dias	Karel Doorman-class frigate	Unknown – unknown	n/a
2025	(Denmark); Commodore; Thomas Stig Rasmussen (January 1 – January 9) (Netherlands); Commodore; Arjen S. Warnaar (January 9 – ongoing)	(Germany) FGS Hamburg	Sachsen-class frigate	Unknown – December 31	n/a

In 2024, SNMG1 consisted of:

Previous flagship
Current flagship

Ships in bold are currently part of the naval force

Year	Commander	Ship	Type	Part of task force	Flagship
2024	(Spain); Rear-Admiral; Joaquin Ruiz Escagedo (January 1 – July 11) (Denmark); Commodore; Thomas Stig Rasmussen (July 11 – ongoing)	(Spain) ESPS Almirante Juan de Borbón	F-100	January 1 – n/a	January 1 – n/a
2024	(Spain); Rear-Admiral; Joaquin Ruiz Escagedo (January 1 – July 11) (Denmark); Commodore; Thomas Stig Rasmussen (July 11 – ongoing)	(Spain) ESPS Cantabria	Replenishment oiler	January 1 – n/a	n/a
2024	(Spain); Rear-Admiral; Joaquin Ruiz Escagedo (January 1 – July 11) (Denmark); Commodore; Thomas Stig Rasmussen (July 11 – ongoing)	(Germany) FGS Bonn	Berlin-class replenishment ship	January 1 – n/a	n/a
2024	(Spain); Rear-Admiral; Joaquin Ruiz Escagedo (January 1 – July 11) (Denmark); Commodore; Thomas Stig Rasmussen (July 11 – ongoing)	(Norway) HNoMS Maud	Replenishment oiler	September 9 – ongoing	September 9 – ongoing
2024	(Spain); Rear-Admiral; Joaquin Ruiz Escagedo (January 1 – July 11) (Denmark); Commodore; Thomas Stig Rasmussen (July 11 – ongoing)	(Netherlands) HNLMS De Ruyter	De Zeven Provinciën-class frigate	August – n/a	n/a
2024	(Spain); Rear-Admiral; Joaquin Ruiz Escagedo (January 1 – July 11) (Denmark); Commodore; Thomas Stig Rasmussen (July 11 – ongoing)	(Portugal) NRP Dom Francisco de Almeida	Multi-purpose frigate	July 31 – n/a	n/a
2024	(Spain); Rear-Admiral; Joaquin Ruiz Escagedo (January 1 – July 11) (Denmark); Commodore; Thomas Stig Rasmussen (July 11 – ongoing)	(France) FS La Fayette	La Fayette class frigate	August – n/a	n/a
2024	(Spain); Rear-Admiral; Joaquin Ruiz Escagedo (January 1 – July 11) (Denmark); Commodore; Thomas Stig Rasmussen (July 11 – ongoing)	(Belgium) BNS Louise-Marie	Karel Doorman-class frigate	October – December	No

In 2023, SNMG1 consisted of:

Previous flagship
Current flagship

Ships in bold are currently part of the naval force

Year	Commander	Ship	Type	Part of task force	Flagship
2023	(Netherlands); Commodore; Jeanette Morang (January 1 – January 6) (Germany); Rear-Admiral; Thorsten Marx (January 6 – ongoing)	(Netherlands) HNLMS Tromp	De Zeven Provinciën-class frigate	September 19 – n/a	September 19 – n/a
2023	(Netherlands); Commodore; Jeanette Morang (January 1 – January 6) (Germany); Rear-Admiral; Thorsten Marx (January 6 – ongoing)	(Germany) FGS Mecklenburg-Vorpommern	Brandenburg-class frigate	January 6 – n/a	n/a
2023	(Netherlands); Commodore; Jeanette Morang (January 1 – January 6) (Germany); Rear-Admiral; Thorsten Marx (January 6 – ongoing)	(Poland) ORP Generał Tadeusz Kościuszko	Oliver Hazard Perry-class frigate	January 6 – n/a	n/a

In 2022, SNMG1 consisted of:

Previous flagship
Current flagship

Ships in bold are currently part of the naval force

Year	Commander	Ship	Type	Part of task force	Flagship
2022	(Netherlands); Commodore; Ad van de Sande (January 7 – July 8) (Netherlands); Commodore; Jeanette Morang (July 8 – ongoing)	(Netherlands) HNLMS Rotterdam	Rotterdam-class amphibious transport dock	January 7 – February 4	January 7 - February 4
2022	(Netherlands); Commodore; Ad van de Sande (January 7 – July 8) (Netherlands); Commodore; Jeanette Morang (July 8 – ongoing)	(Denmark) HDMS Peter Willemoes	Iver Huitfeldt-class frigate	January 15 – April	n/a
2022	(Netherlands); Commodore; Ad van de Sande (January 7 – July 8) (Netherlands); Commodore; Jeanette Morang (July 8 – ongoing)	(United Kingdom) HMS Kent	Duke-class frigate	January 24 – February 4	n/a
2022	(Netherlands); Commodore; Ad van de Sande (January 7 – July 8) (Netherlands); Commodore; Jeanette Morang (July 8 – ongoing)	(Germany) FGS Berlin	Berlin-class replenishment ship	February 4 – April	February 4 – April 6
2022	(Netherlands); Commodore; Ad van de Sande (January 7 – July 8) (Netherlands); Commodore; Jeanette Morang (July 8 – ongoing)	(Netherlands) HNLMS Van Amstel	Karel Doorman-class frigate	February 7 – March	n/a
2022	(Netherlands); Commodore; Ad van de Sande (January 7 – July 8) (Netherlands); Commodore; Jeanette Morang (July 8 – ongoing)	(Germany) FGS Erfurt	Braunschweig-class corvette	March 2 – May	n/a
2022	(Netherlands); Commodore; Ad van de Sande (January 7 – July 8) (Netherlands); Commodore; Jeanette Morang (July 8 – ongoing)	(Netherlands) HNLMS De Zeven Provincien	De Zeven Provinciën-class frigate	March 10 – July	April 6 - July
2022	(Netherlands); Commodore; Ad van de Sande (January 7 – July 8) (Netherlands); Commodore; Jeanette Morang (July 8 – ongoing)	(United Kingdom) HMS Northumberland	Duke-class frigate	March – April 20	n/a
2022	(Netherlands); Commodore; Ad van de Sande (January 7 – July 8) (Netherlands); Commodore; Jeanette Morang (July 8 – ongoing)	(France) FS Languedoc	Aquitaine-class destroyer	March – April	n/a
2022	(Netherlands); Commodore; Ad van de Sande (January 7 – July 8) (Netherlands); Commodore; Jeanette Morang (July 8 – ongoing)	(France) FS Dixmude	Mistral-class amphibious assault ship	March – April	n/a
2022	(Netherlands); Commodore; Ad van de Sande (January 7 – July 8) (Netherlands); Commodore; Jeanette Morang (July 8 – ongoing)	(France) FS Latouche-Tréville	Georges Leygues-class destroyer	March – May	n/a
2022	(Netherlands); Commodore; Ad van de Sande (January 7 – July 8) (Netherlands); Commodore; Jeanette Morang (July 8 – ongoing)	(Canada) HMCS Halifax	Halifax-class frigate	April 18 – July	n/a
2022	(Netherlands); Commodore; Ad van de Sande (January 7 – July 8) (Netherlands); Commodore; Jeanette Morang (July 8 – ongoing)	(Germany) FGS Spessart	Rhön-class replenishment oiler	April – August 4	n/a
2022	(Netherlands); Commodore; Ad van de Sande (January 7 – July 8) (Netherlands); Commodore; Jeanette Morang (July 8 – ongoing)	(Netherlands) HNLMS Karel Doorman	Joint support ship	May 8 – September 23	July 8 – September 19
2022	(Netherlands); Commodore; Ad van de Sande (January 7 – July 8) (Netherlands); Commodore; Jeanette Morang (July 8 – ongoing)	(Portugal) NRP Corte-Real	Vasco da Gama-class frigate	May 27 – September 14	n/a
2022	(Netherlands); Commodore; Ad van de Sande (January 7 – July 8) (Netherlands); Commodore; Jeanette Morang (July 8 – ongoing)	(Germany) FGS Mecklenburg-Vorpommern	Brandenburg-class frigate	May 30 – July 15	n/a
2022	(Netherlands); Commodore; Ad van de Sande (January 7 – July 8) (Netherlands); Commodore; Jeanette Morang (July 8 – ongoing)	(United Kingdom) HMS Portland	Duke-class frigate	June 15 – August 4	n/a
2022	(Netherlands); Commodore; Ad van de Sande (January 7 – July 8) (Netherlands); Commodore; Jeanette Morang (July 8 – ongoing)	(Norway) HNoMS Roald Amundsen	Fridtjof Nansen-class frigate	August 9 – November / December	n/a
2022	(Netherlands); Commodore; Ad van de Sande (January 7 – July 8) (Netherlands); Commodore; Jeanette Morang (July 8 – ongoing)	(Norway) HNoMS Maud	Replenishment oiler	August 29 – November / December	n/a
2022	(Netherlands); Commodore; Ad van de Sande (January 7 – July 8) (Netherlands); Commodore; Jeanette Morang (July 8 – ongoing)	(United Kingdom) HMS Lancaster	Duke-class frigate	August 29 – October 6	n/a
2022	(Netherlands); Commodore; Ad van de Sande (January 7 – July 8) (Netherlands); Commodore; Jeanette Morang (July 8 – ongoing)	(Germany) FGS Mecklenburg-Vorpommern	Brandenburg-class frigate	September 10 – October 11	n/a
2022	(Netherlands); Commodore; Ad van de Sande (January 7 – July 8) (Netherlands); Commodore; Jeanette Morang (July 8 – ongoing)	(Netherlands) HNLMS Tromp	De Zeven Provinciën-class frigate	September 19 – ongoing	September 19 – ongoing
2022	(Netherlands); Commodore; Ad van de Sande (January 7 – July 8) (Netherlands); Commodore; Jeanette Morang (July 8 – ongoing)	(France) FS Ducuing	D'Estienne d'Orves-class aviso	September 24 – October	n/a
2022	(Netherlands); Commodore; Ad van de Sande (January 7 – July 8) (Netherlands); Commodore; Jeanette Morang (July 8 – ongoing)	(Denmark) HDMS Esbern Snare	Absalon-class frigate	October 26 – November / December	n/a

In 2021, SNMG1 consisted of:

Previous flagship
Current flagship

Year	Commander	Ship	Type	Part of task force	Flagship
2021	(Canada); Commodore; Bradley Peats	(Canada) HMCS Halifax	Frigate	January 18 – April 12; May 19 – July 10	January 18 – April 12; May 19 – July 10
2021	(Canada); Commodore; Bradley Peats	(Denmark) HDMS Absalon	Frigate	March 25 – June 18	April 12 – May 19
2021	(Canada); Commodore; Bradley Peats	(United Kingdom) HMS Lancaster	Frigate	March	n/a
2021	(Canada); Commodore; Bradley Peats	(United Kingdom) HMS Westminster	Frigate	March	n/a
2021	(Canada); Commodore; Bradley Peats	(United Kingdom) RFA Tiderace	Replenishment Oiler	March	n/a
2021	(Canada); Commodore; Bradley Peats	(France) FS Bretagne	Aquitaine class destroyer	May 7 – May 14; November 22 – December 15	n/a
2021	(Canada); Commodore; Bradley Peats	(France) FS Normandie	Aquitaine class destroyer	May 21 – May 30; September 22 – September 29	n/a
2021	(Canada); Commodore; Bradley Peats	(Norway) HNoMS Storm	Corvette	June 6 – June 18	n/a
2021	(Canada); Commodore; Bradley Peats	(Norway) HNoMS Gnist	Corvette	June 6 – June 18	n/a
2021	(Canada); Commodore; Bradley Peats	(France) FS Commandant Blaison	D'Estienne d'Orves-class aviso	June 6 – June 18	n/a
2021	(Canada); Commodore; Bradley Peats	(Canada) HMCS Fredericton	Frigate	August 2 – October 5 October 17 – December 15	August 2 – October 5 October 30 – December 15
2021	(Canada); Commodore; Bradley Peats	(Portugal) NRP Corte-Real	Frigate	August 25 – December 15	n/a
2021	(Canada); Commodore; Bradley Peats	(Netherlands) HNLMS Van Amstel	Frigate	September 6 – December 15	n/a
2021	(Canada); Commodore; Bradley Peats	(Norway) HNoMS Maud	Replenishment Oiler	September 6 – December 3	n/a
2021	(Canada); Commodore; Bradley Peats	(Spain) ESPS Almirante Juan de Borbón	Frigate	September 16 – October 30	October 5 – October 30
2021	(Canada); Commodore; Bradley Peats	(Belgium) BNS Leopold I	Frigate	October 9 – October 29	n/a

During this deployment, SNMG1 took part in numerous exercises including:

- **TG 21-1** from February 8 to February 19 in Norway
- **Dynamic Guard 21** from February 24 to February 26 in Norway
- **Joint Warrior 21-1** from May 7 to May 14 in the United Kingdom
- **Steadfast Defender 21** from May 21 to June 2 in Portugal
- **BALTOPS50** from June 6 to June 18 in the Baltic Sea
- **Dynamic Mongoose 21** from July 1 to July 9 in Norway
- **Joint Warrior 21-2** from 18 September to 30 September 2021 in the United Kingdom
- **FLOTEX 21** from November 22 to December 3 in Norway
- **Exercise REP(MUS)** from 12 September to 22 September in Portugal

== See also ==
- Standing NATO Maritime Group 2
- Standing NATO Mine Countermeasures Group 1
- Standing NATO Mine Countermeasures Group 2
