= Kroger (disambiguation) =

Kroger is an American retail supermarket chain. Kroger may also refer to:

- Surname Kröger (Kroeger) written without diacritics
- Kroger (surname)
- The Kroger 200, a NASCAR Busch Series race held at Indianapolis Raceway Park
- The Kroger 200, a NASCAR Craftsman Truck Series race held at Martinsville Speedway
- The Kroger 250, a NASCAR Craftsman Truck Series race that takes place at Martinsville Speedway
