= Kroker =

Kroker or Kröker is a surname. It may be derived from German Krakauer, resident of Krakow. Notable people with the surname include:

- Arthur Kroker (born 1945), Canadian academic
- Herbert Kroker (1929–2022), German politician
- Jens Kroker (born 1969), German Paralympic sailor

== See also ==
- Kroger
- Kroeker
