= Kroeker =

Kroeker is a German surname, a variant of Kroeger/Kröger/Krueger. Notable people with the surname include:

- Allan Kroeker (born 1951), Canadian film and television director, cinematographer, screenwriter, film editor and producer
- Joel Kroeker, Canadian singer-songwriter
- Kendell Kroeker, American politician
- Tim Kroeker (born 1971), Canadian athlete

== See also ==
- Kroker
