= German tanker Spessart =

Rhön-class tanker

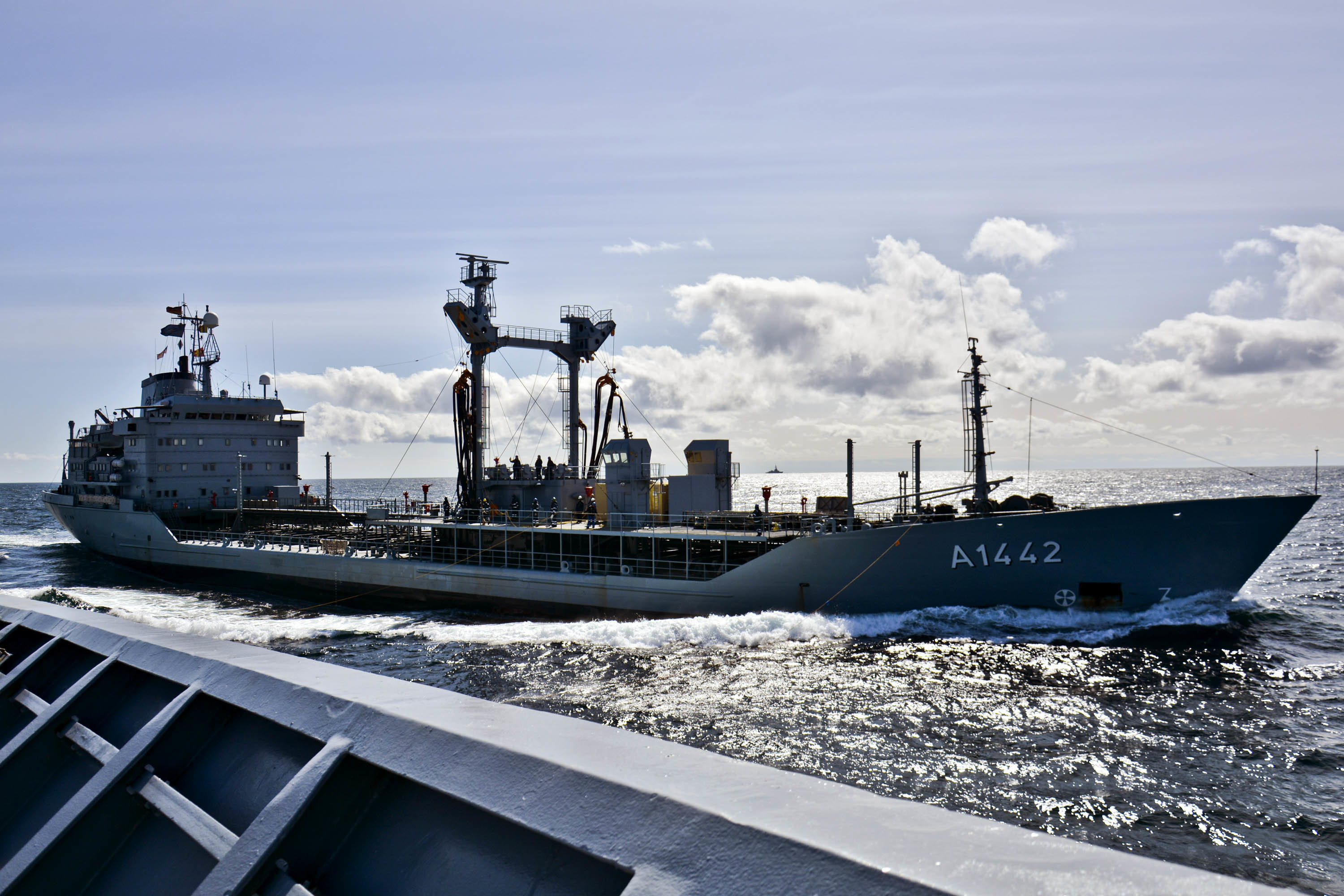
- Spessart replenishes USS Vicksburg on 10 May 2015.

History

Germany
- Name: Spessart
- Namesake: Spessart
- Owner: Deutsche Marine
- Port of registry: Hamburg, Germany
- Builder: Kröger, Rendsburg
- Launched: 13 February 1975
- Acquired: 1976
- Commissioned: 5 September 1977
- Renamed: Okapi
- Home port: Kiel, Germany
- Identification: IMO number: 7362079; MMSI number: 211211850; Callsign: DRKN; Pennant number: A1442
- Status: Active

General characteristics
- Type: Rhön-class tanker
- Tonnage: 6,103 GRT; 10,800 DWT
- Displacement: 14,396 t (14,169 long tons)
- Length: 130.2 m (427 ft 2 in)
- Beam: 19.3 m (63 ft 4 in)
- Draught: 8.7 m (28 ft 7 in)
- Installed power: 1 MaK 12-cylinder diesel engine; 5,880 kW (7,890 hp)
- Propulsion: 1 shaft, controllable pitch propeller
- Speed: 16 knots (30 km/h; 18 mph)
- Range: 3,250 nmi (6,020 km; 3,740 mi) at 12 knots (22 km/h; 14 mph)
- Capacity: 11,000 m^{3} (390,000 cu ft) (fuel); 400 m^{3} (14,000 cu ft) (water)
- Complement: 42 (civilian)

Spessart (A1442) is the second ship of the Rhön-class tankers of the German Navy. She was commissioned at Kiel, Germany on 5 September 1977.

== Construction and career ==
Spessart was originally built for civilian service by Kröger of Rendsburg in 1974. On 5 September 1977 she was commissioned into the German Navy, based at Kiel, Germany.

On 29 March 2009, as she was taking part in Operation Atalanta, Spessart was attacked by a 7-man pirate boat. In addition to the regular 40-man civilian crew, Spessart carried a 12-man security detail which exchanged small arm fire with the pirates, and repelled the assault. The German frigate Rheinland-Pfalz intervened, along with vessels from several other navies: HNLMS De Zeven Provinciën, Psara, Victoria, and USS Boxer. The pirates were captured after a chase lasting a few hours.

== Gallery ==
Spessart gallery

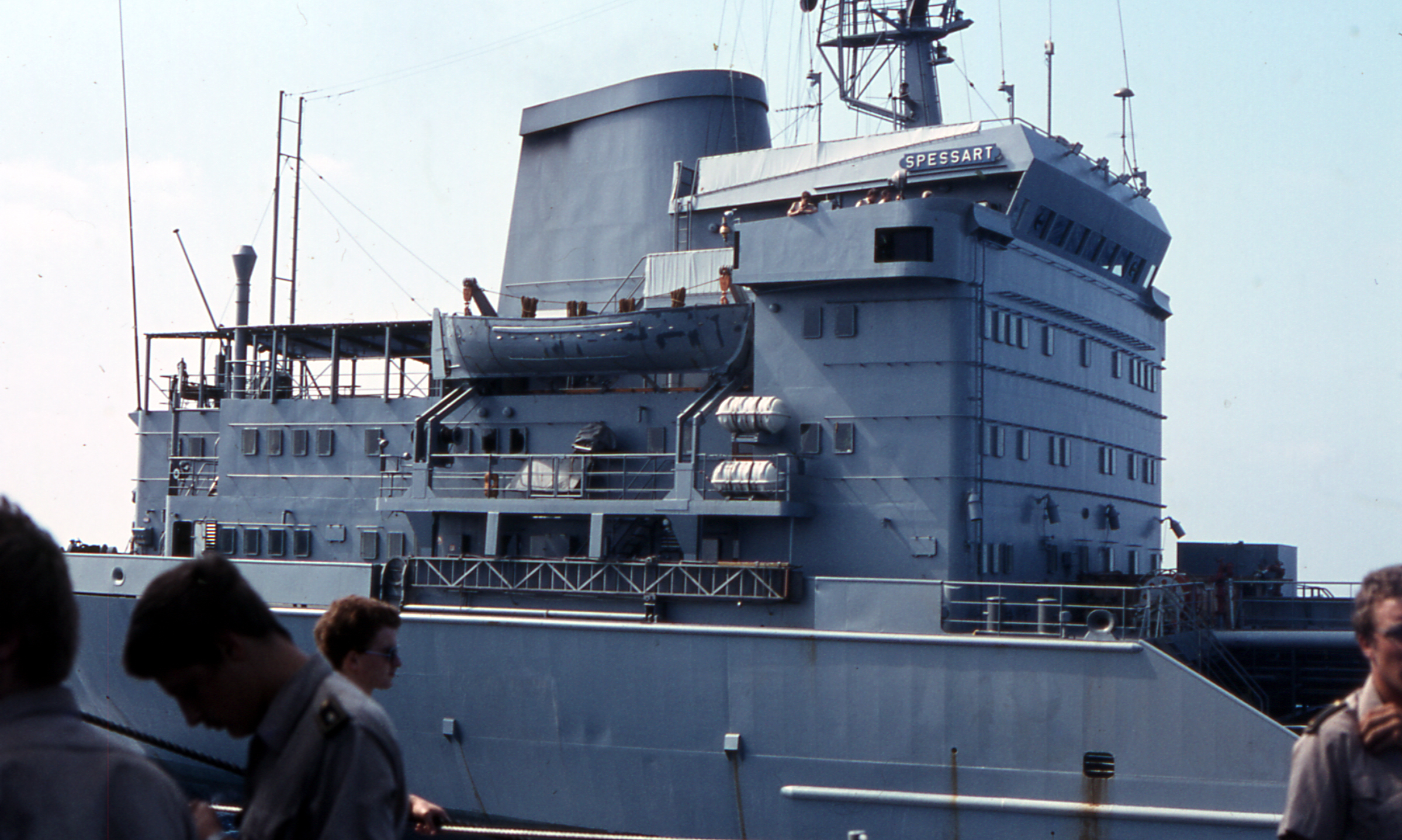
Spessart alongside to replenish Lütjens on 31 July 1980

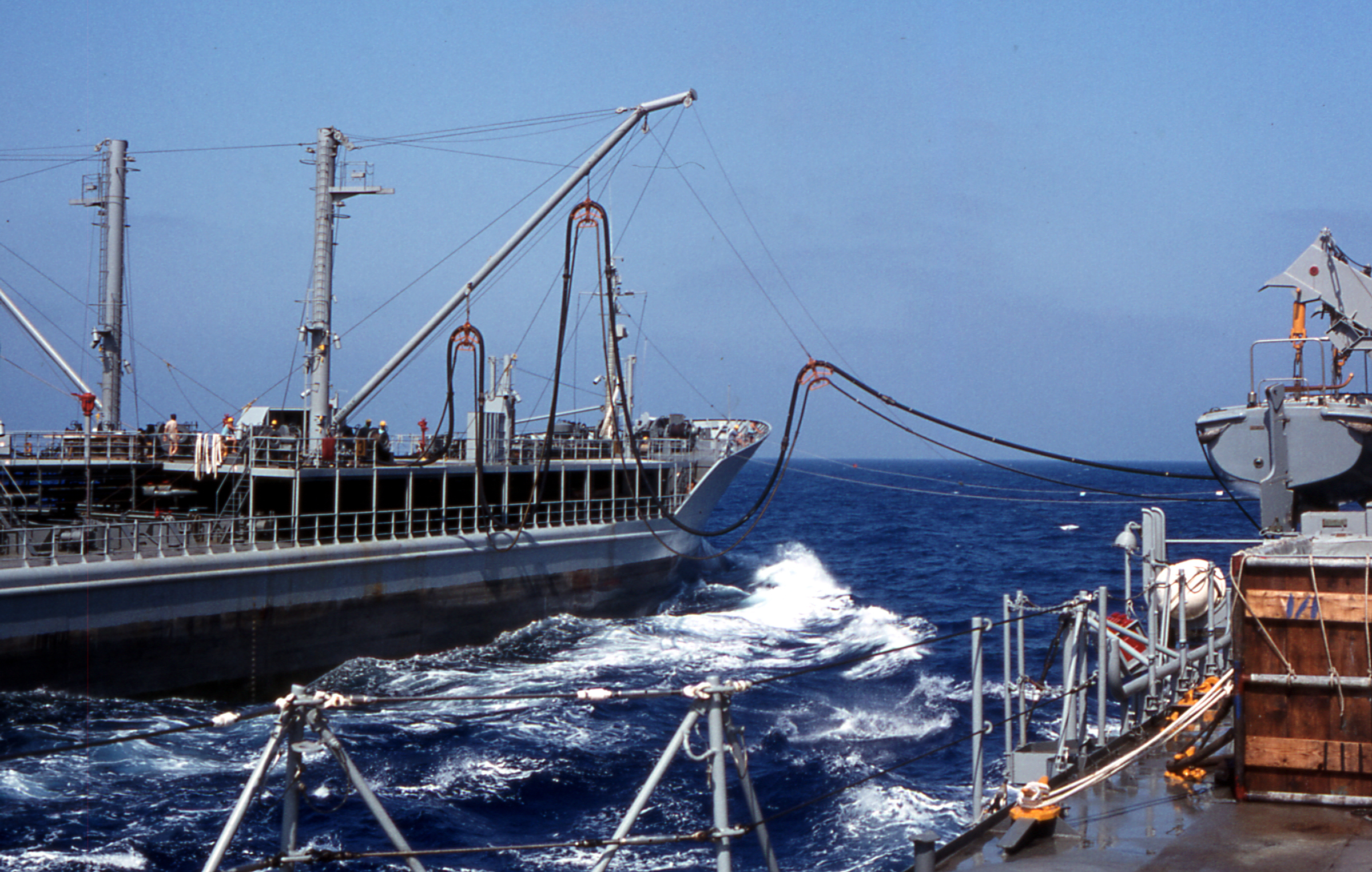
Spessart alongside to replenish Lütjens on 31 July 1980

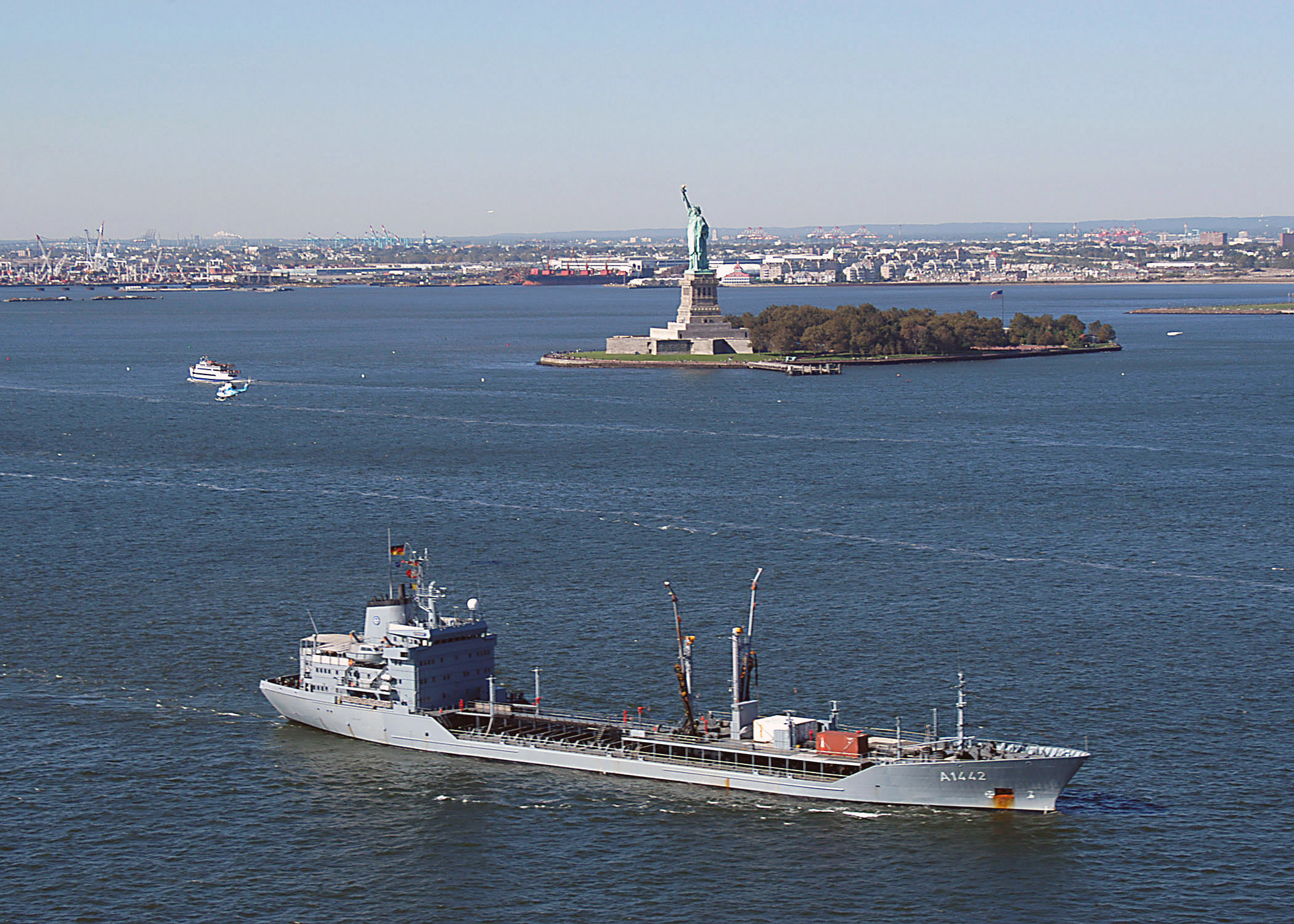
Spessart entering New York Harbor on 13 October 2004

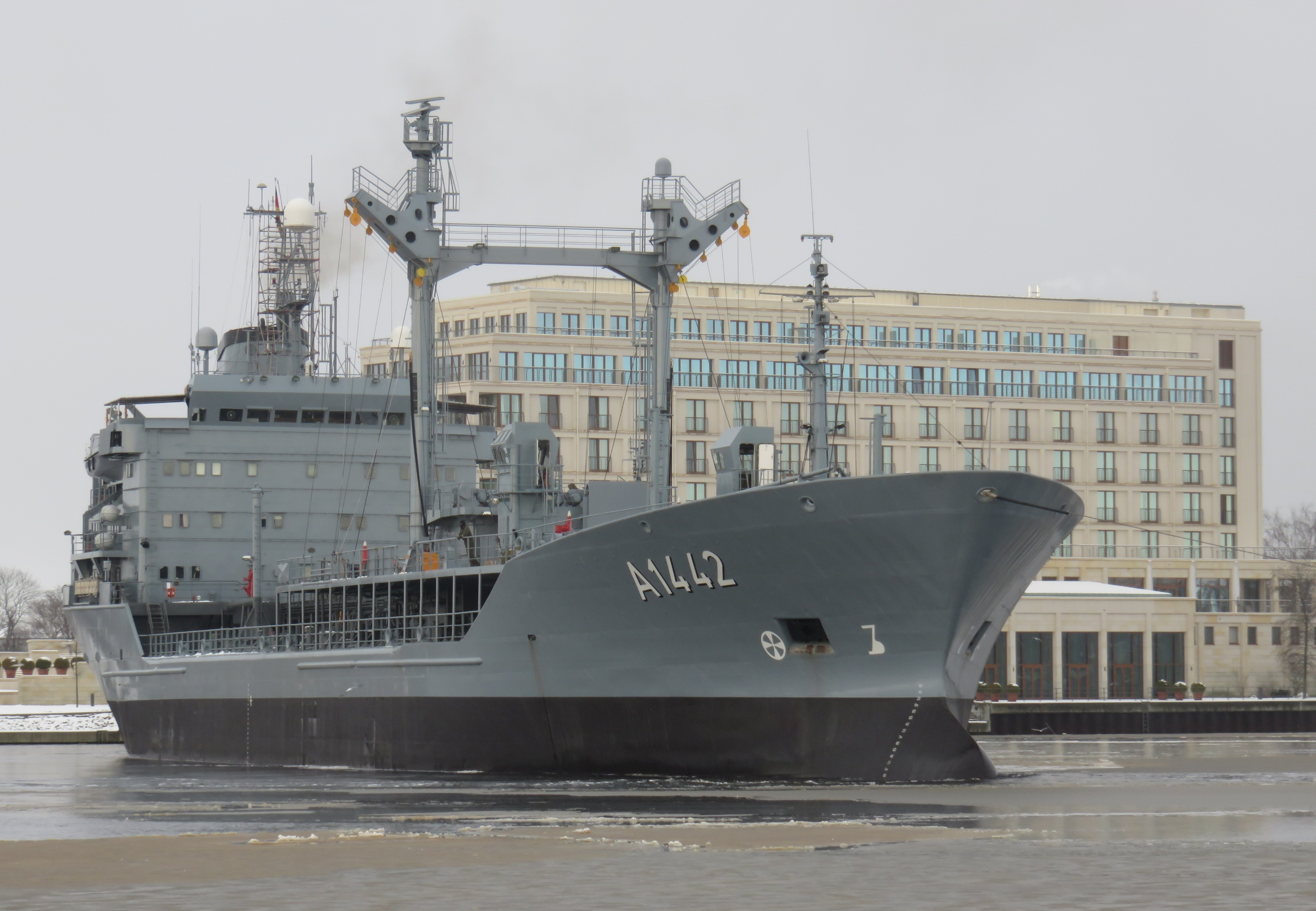
Spessart at the deperming range in Wilhelmshaven on 20 January 2016

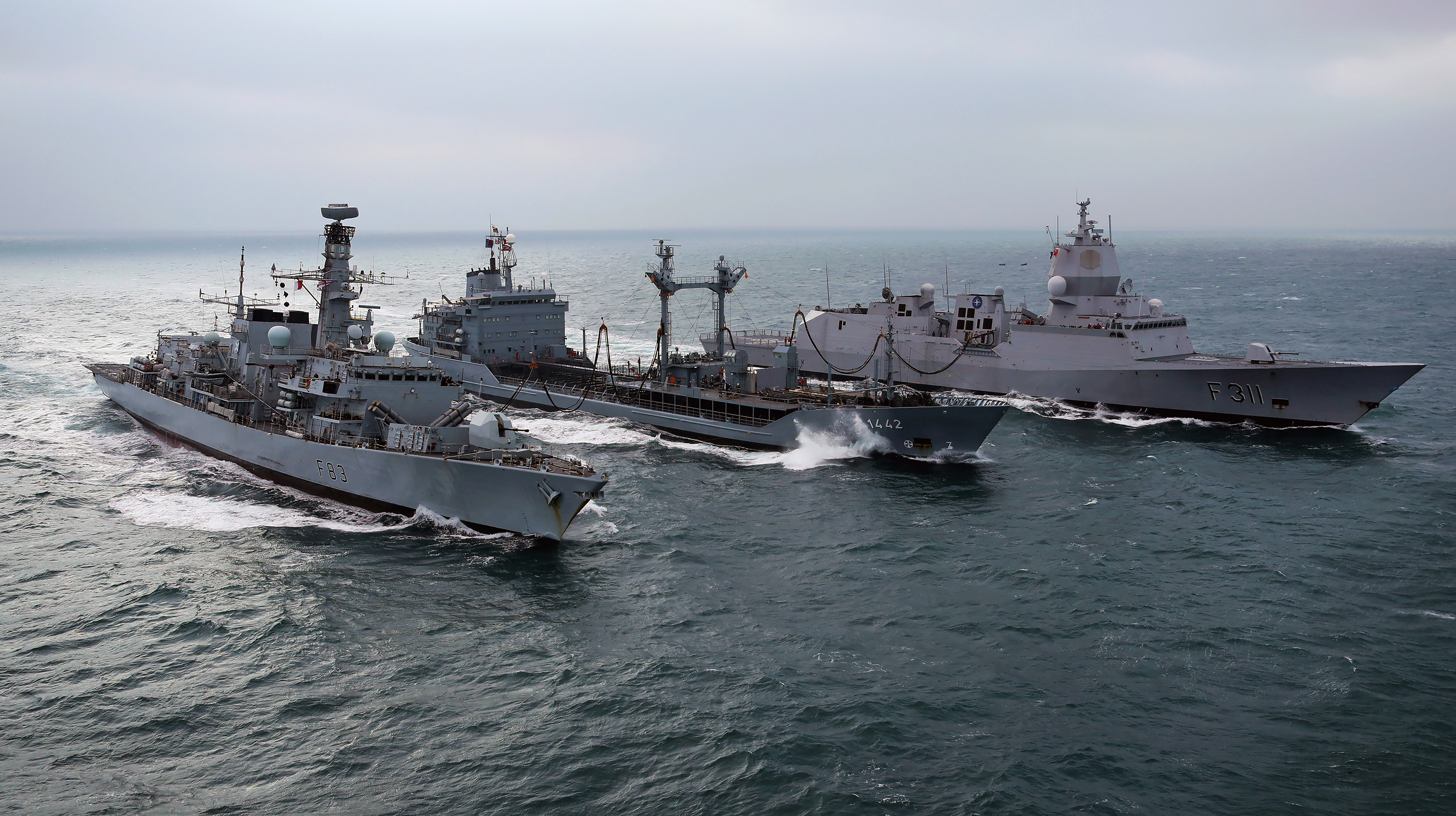
HMS St Albans, Spessart and HNoMS Roald Amundsen replenishing on 26 January 2017

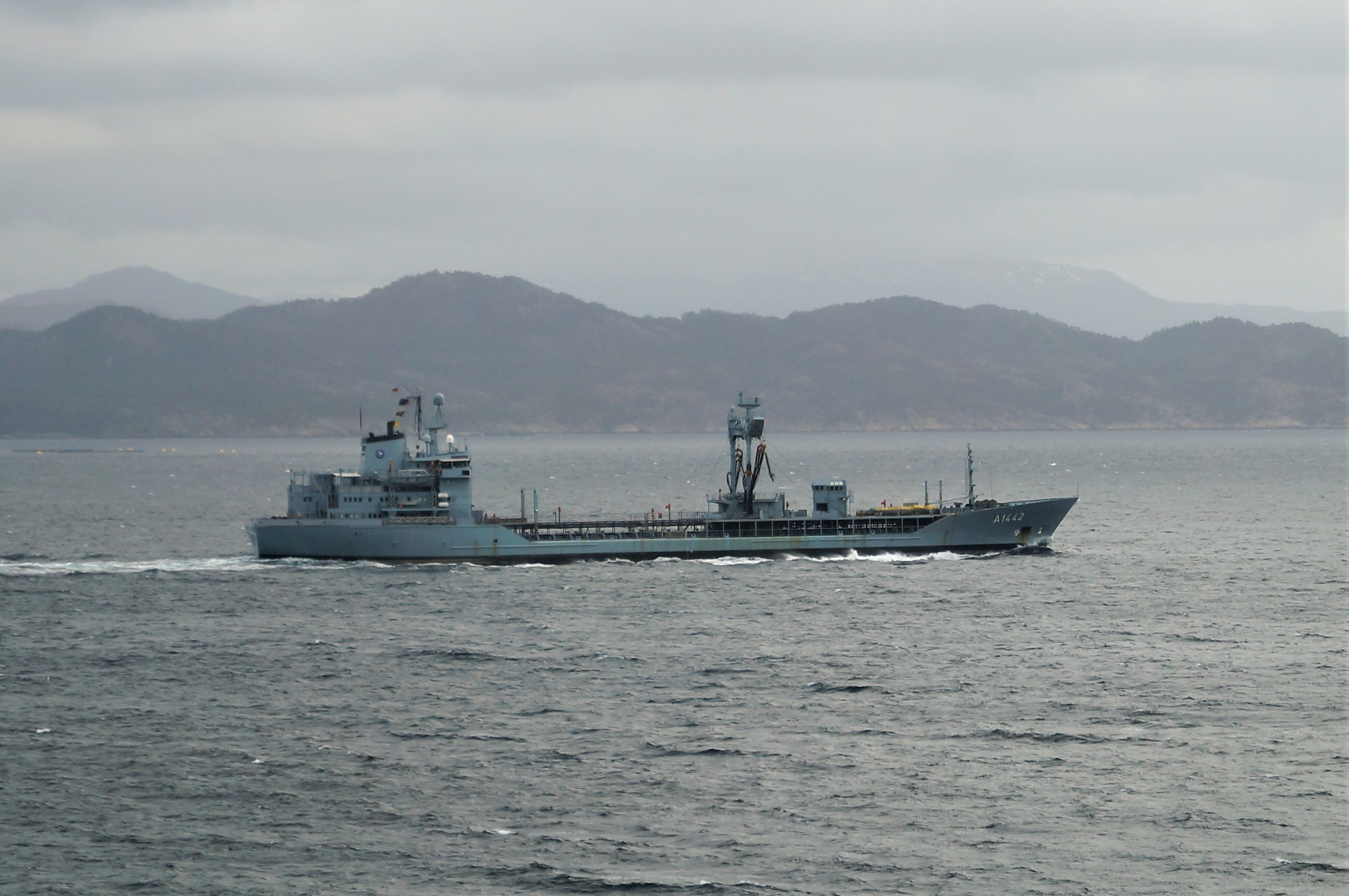
Spessart underway on 18 February 2019
