= HNLMS De Ruyter (F804) =

Dutch frigate

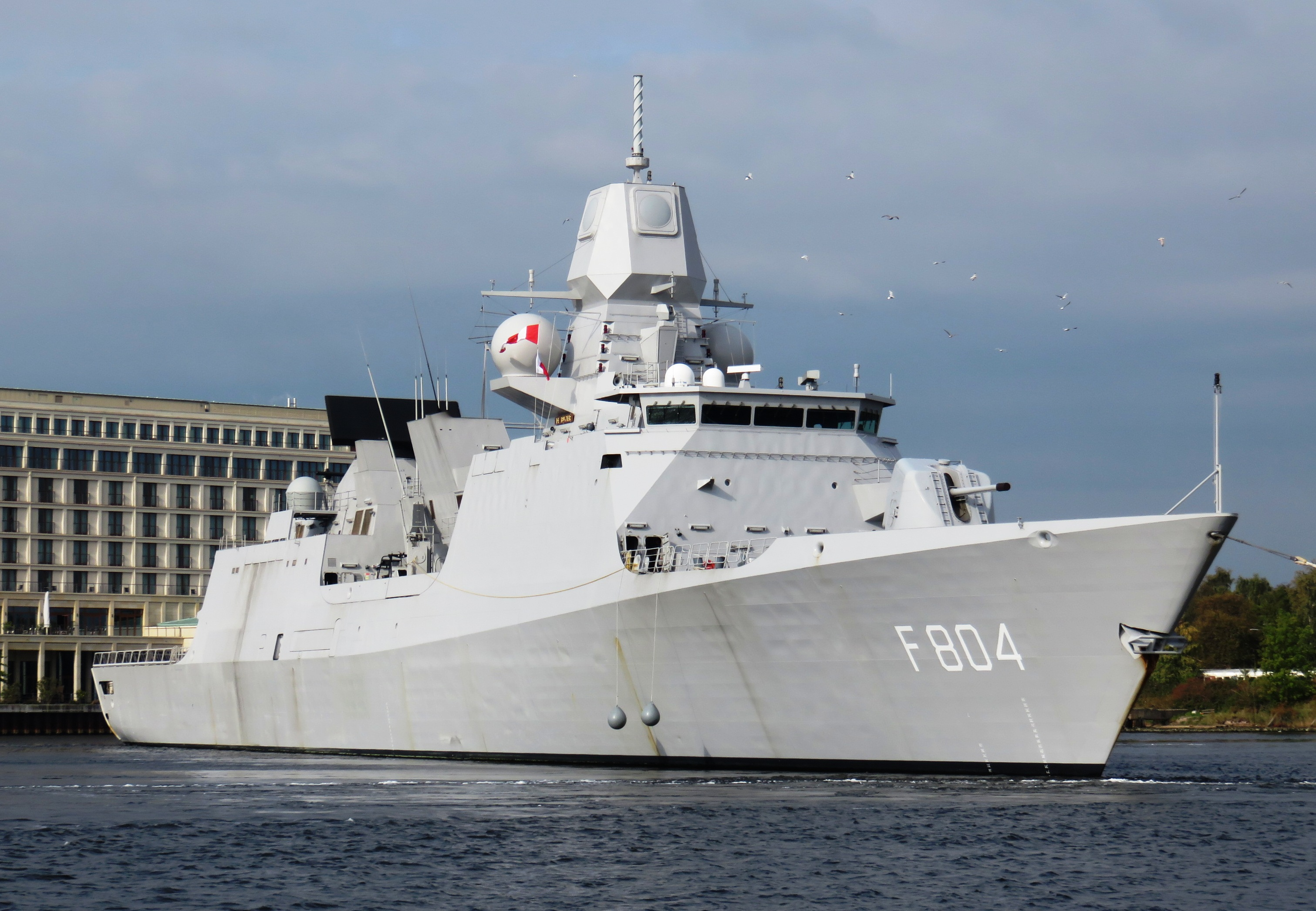
- HNLMS De Ruyter in Wilhelmshaven in 2015.

History

Netherlands
- Name: De Ruyter
- Namesake: Michiel de Ruyter
- Builder: Damen Schelde Naval Shipbuilding
- Laid down: 1 September 2000
- Launched: 13 April 2002
- Commissioned: March 2004
- Identification: MMSI number: 244896000; Callsign: PAER; Pennant number: F804
- Status: In active service
- Badge

General characteristics
- Class & type: De Zeven Provinciën-class frigate
- Displacement: 6,050 t (5,950 long tons) (full load)
- Length: 144.24 m (473 ft 3 in)
- Beam: 18.80 m (61 ft 8 in)
- Draft: 5.18 m (17 ft 0 in)
- Propulsion: Combined diesel or gas; 2 × Wärtsilä 16 V26 marine diesel engines, 5.1 MW (6,800 hp) each; 2 × Rolls-Royce Marine Spey SM 1C gas turbines, 19.5 MW (26,100 hp) each; 2 × propeller shafts, 5-bladed controllable pitch propellers
- Speed: 30 knots (56 km/h; 35 mph)
- Complement: 174 (227 incl. command staff)
- Sensors & processing systems: Thales Nederland SMART-L long-range air and surface surveillance radar; Thales Nederland APAR air and surface search, tracking and guidance radar (I band); DECCA NAV navigation radar; Thales Nederland Scout (Low-probability-of-intercept) surface search/navigation radar; Thales Nederland Sirius IRST long-range infrared surveillance and tracking system; Thales Nederland Mirador optical surveillance and tracking system; Atlas Elektronik DSQS-24C hull-mounted sonar; MK XII IFF system
- Armament: Guns: 1 × Oto Melara 127 mm/54 dual-purpose gun; 2–4 × Browning M2 12.7 mm machine guns; 4–6 × FN MAG 7.62 mm machine guns; 1–2 × Goalkeeper CIWS; Missiles: 40-cell Mk 41 vertical launching system; 32 × SM-2 IIIA surface-to-air missiles; 32 × Evolved SeaSparrow missiles (quad-packed); 8 × Harpoon anti-ship missiles; 2 × twin Mk 32 Mod 9 torpedo launchers with Mk 46 Mod 5 torpedoes
- Aircraft carried: 1 × NH90 NFH helicopter

HNLMS De Ruyter (Dutch: Zr. Ms. De Ruyter) is a De Zeven Provinciën-class frigate of the Royal Netherlands Navy. She was laid down in 2000, launched in 2002, and commissioned in 2004, the third ship of her class to enter service. The frigate is named after Dutch admiral Michiel de Ruyter (1607–1676).

== Service history ==
=== 2005–2014 ===
From 2005 until 2007 De Ruyter was commanded by Rob Bauer, during which period she was deployed to the Mediterranean as part of Standing NATO Maritime Group 2 as part of the NATO Response Force in Operation Active Endeavour. In late 2006, Bauer was deployed to Bahrain for five months as Deputy Commander of Combined Task Force 150 in Operation Enduring Freedom. From 12 January 2007 to July 2009 De Ruyter was commanded by Commander Jeanette Morang, the first woman to command a frigate of the Royal Netherlands Navy. Commander Harold Liebregs was De Ruyter's commanding officer from December 2012.

In September and October 2007, satellite television channels in Israel were plagued with signal disruptions, with the north of the country particularly badly affected. Eventually the Ministry of Defense intervened, and with the help of the Israel Defense Forces and Israeli Sea Corps, discovered that the problems had been caused by the radar systems of Dutch UNIFIL ships patrolling off the coast of Lebanon. De Ruyter, anchored off the coast of the Lebanon, allegedly transmitted signals onto frequencies adjacent to those used by the satellite operator.

On 12 January 2012 De Ruyter sailed from her home port of Den Helder to take up the role of flagship for Standing NATO Maritime Group 1. The group, led by Dutch Commodore Ben Bekkering, was under Dutch command for the remainder of the year, beginning on 23 January when De Ruyter assumed the flagship role in the Italian port of Taranto. De Ruyter took part in maritime operations and exercises in the Mediterranean and counterpiracy operations around the Horn of Africa, before being replaced by her sister ship HNLMS Evertsen in April.

In early 2013 De Ruyter deployed with Operation Atalanta, the EU's anti-piracy mission off the Horn of Africa. On 19 February De Ruyter was tasked to locate a group of suspected pirate skiffs reported by a Panamanian merchant ship. De Ruyter located two skiffs 200 nautical miles (370 km; 230 mi) north east of Eyl, which split up when approached. One was stopped and detained by the De Ruyter, the other was apprehended by the Spanish frigate Méndez Núñez. Nine suspected pirates were then detained aboard the De Ruyter. The suspected pirates were transferred to authorities in the Seychelles on 25 February for prosecution. On 27 March De Ruyter's NH90 NFH helicopter carried out a series of exercises involving landing on the Spanish patrol vessel Rayo, the "first helicopter from another Operation Atalanta unit to land on the Spanish warship".

On 9 April 2013 De Ruyter hosted Dutch Prime Minister Mark Rutte, Defence Minister Jeanine Hennis-Plasschaert, and the Chief of Defence General Tom Middendorp on an official visit while De Ruyter was operating off the Somali coast. De Ruyter served as the flagship for the maritime component of the NATO exercise "Steadfast Jazz 2013", which took place in the Baltic Sea in October and November 2013.

=== 2015–2024 ===
In September 2016 she became flagship of Standing NATO Maritime Group 2 in the Aegean Sea, replacing the German frigate Karlsruhe in the role. De Ruyter was in turn replaced in December 2016 by the German frigate Sachsen.

On 29 January 2016 De Ruyter assisted two lifeboats of the Royal National Lifeboat Institution with the rescue of the cargo vessel MV Verity. Following engine failure the stricken Verity was drifting towards the coastline and had to be taken under tow by the lifeboats to keep it clear of the coast. Shortly after De Ruyter arrived and took over the tow, the captain maintained the position of the stricken vessel with before it could be towed out to anchor prior to the arrival of a tug. De Ruyter was then involved in Exercise Formidable Shield off the Scottish coast in 2017. De Ruyter was tasked with providing data from her Thales Nederland SMART-L long-range air and surface surveillance radar to a US destroyer launching a SM-3 missile against a ballistic missile target.

On 3 July 2018 De Ruyter once again became the flagship of Standing NATO Maritime Group 2, taking over from the Royal Navy's HMS Duncan, with Dutch Commodore Boudewijn G.F.M. Boots succeeding British Commodore Mike Utley. In September 2018 De Ruyter and Standing NATO Maritime Group 2 took part in the Hellenic Navy's biennial multinational naval Exercise Naias 2018. On 25 October 2018, the frigate was scheduled to take part in the NATO exercise Trident Juncture which was held in and around Norway in 2018.

On 28 January 2020, De Ruyter left Nieuwe Haven to join the French-Led Task Force, European-led Maritime Awareness in the Strait of Hormuz (EMASOH), in the Persian Gulf. Between 7 and 8 February 2020, the vessel participated in a joint training operation with the Maritime Squadron of the Armed Forces of Malta which involved various scenarios at sea. She was joined by the Maltese patrol vessel P62. The onboard NH90 NFH was joined in the air by the Maltese AW139.

During its mid-life upgrade the De Ruyter was equipped with an improved Thales SMART-L multi-mission radar that can spot incoming ballistic missiles.

=== 2025–present ===
On 12 March 2025, De Ruyter fired a Tomahawk off the coast of Norfolk, becoming the first Dutch vessel to do so.

In February 2026 it was announced that De Ruyter will deploy in mid-April for five months to the Indo-Pacific. During her deployment in the Indo-Pacific, De Ruyter will participate in exercises with partner nations and visit several ports in the region. The purpose of the deployment is to strengthen ties with countries in the region and to promote maritime security and stability, which are a Dutch national interest. The first of the seven scheduled port calls was conducted at Kochi, India on 6 May. The ship also undertook a passage exercise (PASSEX) with the Indian Navy ship, INS Sharda (P55), on departure the following day. On 26 May, China's People's Liberation Army stated that it used electronic warfare attacks on the De Ruyter to drive it out of disputed areas in the South China Sea near the Paracel Islands. The Chinese military subsequently stated that dispatched naval and air assets track to the frigate as it transited the Taiwan Strait.

In June 2026 the Dutch government announced that De Ruyter would be sent towards the Strait of Hormuz. It will take some weeks before she will arrive, since she has to journey from the Indo-Pacific. A formal decision on any deployment has not yet been taken. In August the ship had a multinational staff on board the ship in preparation for a possible deployment in the Strait of Hormuz. The next month, in September, it was decided that De Ruyter would return to the Netherlands and be replaced by HNLMS Evertsen.

== Gallery ==
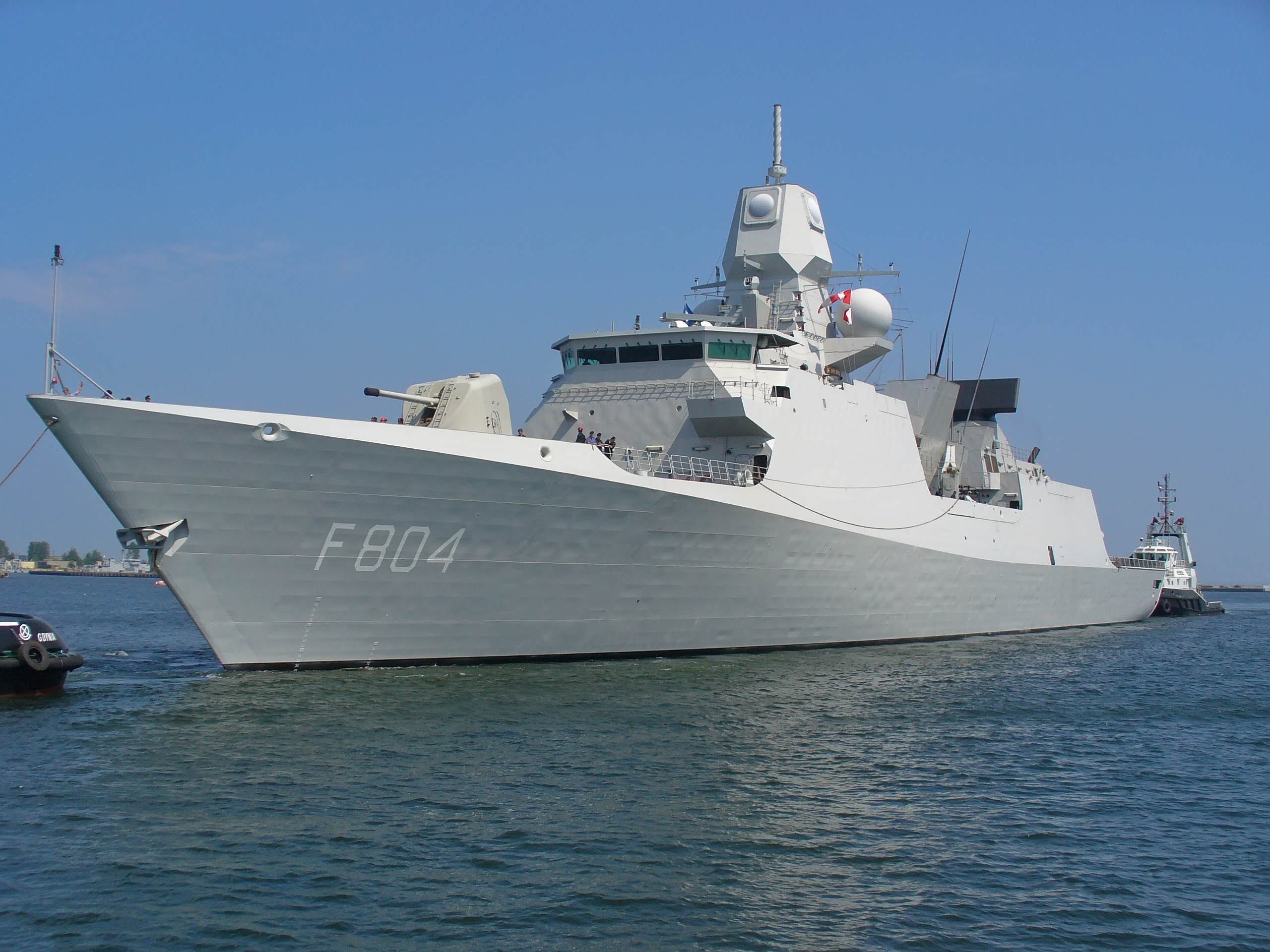
De Ruyter in Gdynia

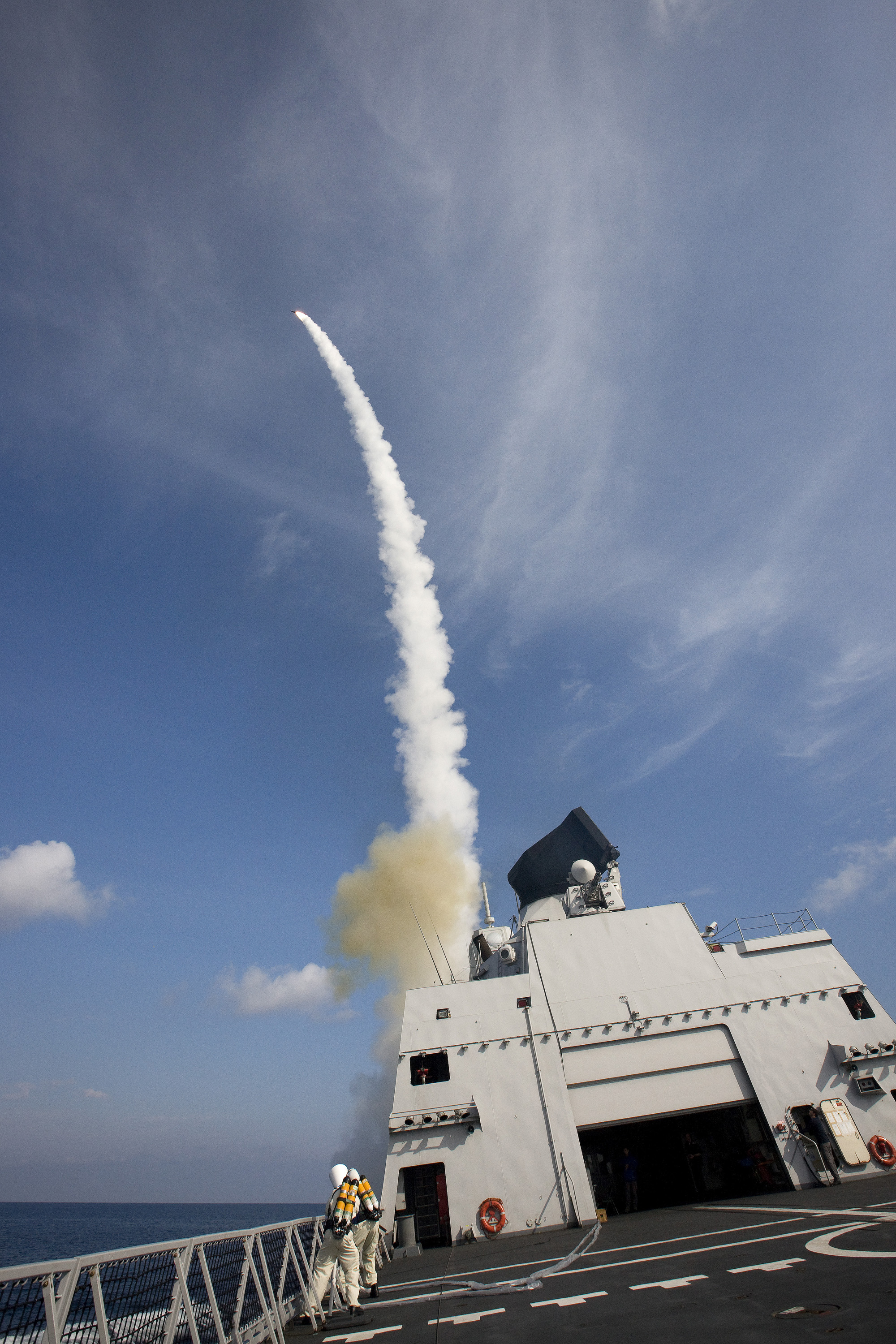
De Ruyter fires a SM-2

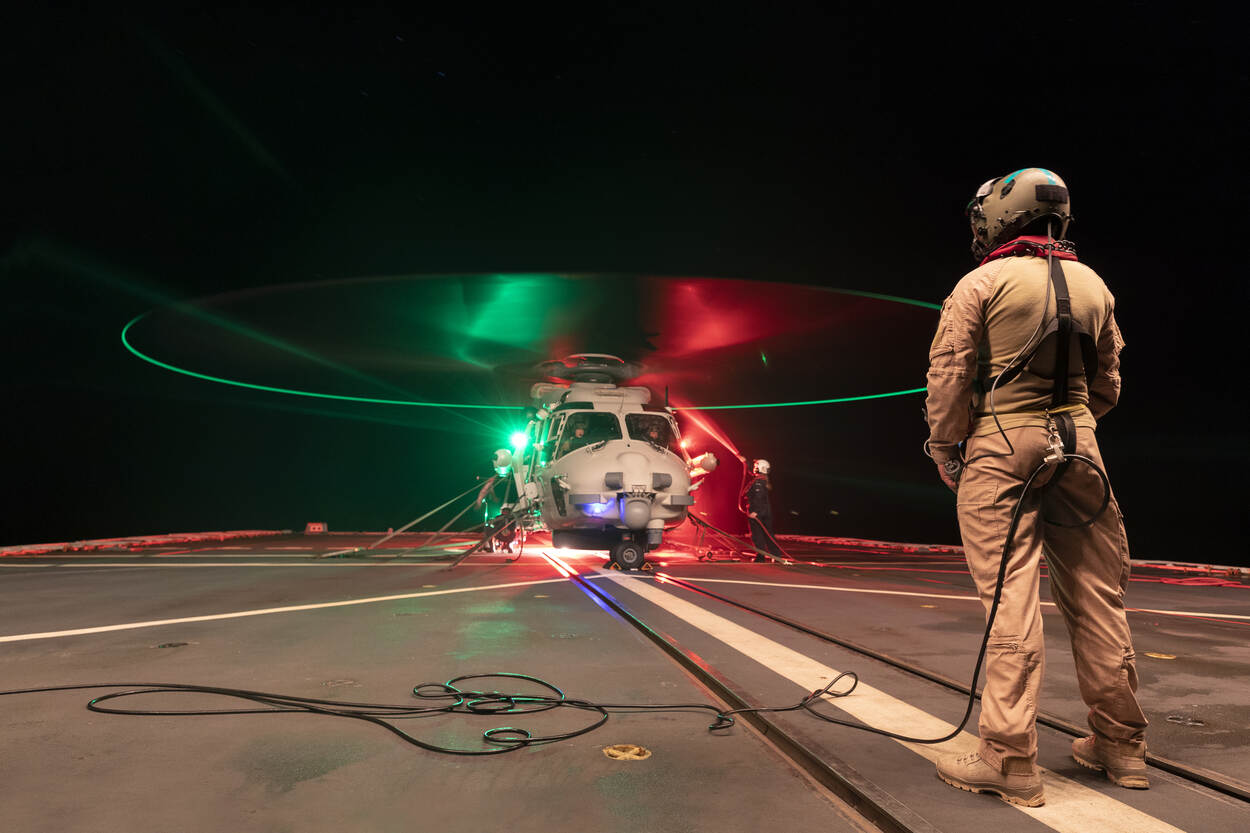
Flight deck of De Ruyter in February 2020
