= Type 707 tanker =

Series of German Navy replenishment oilers

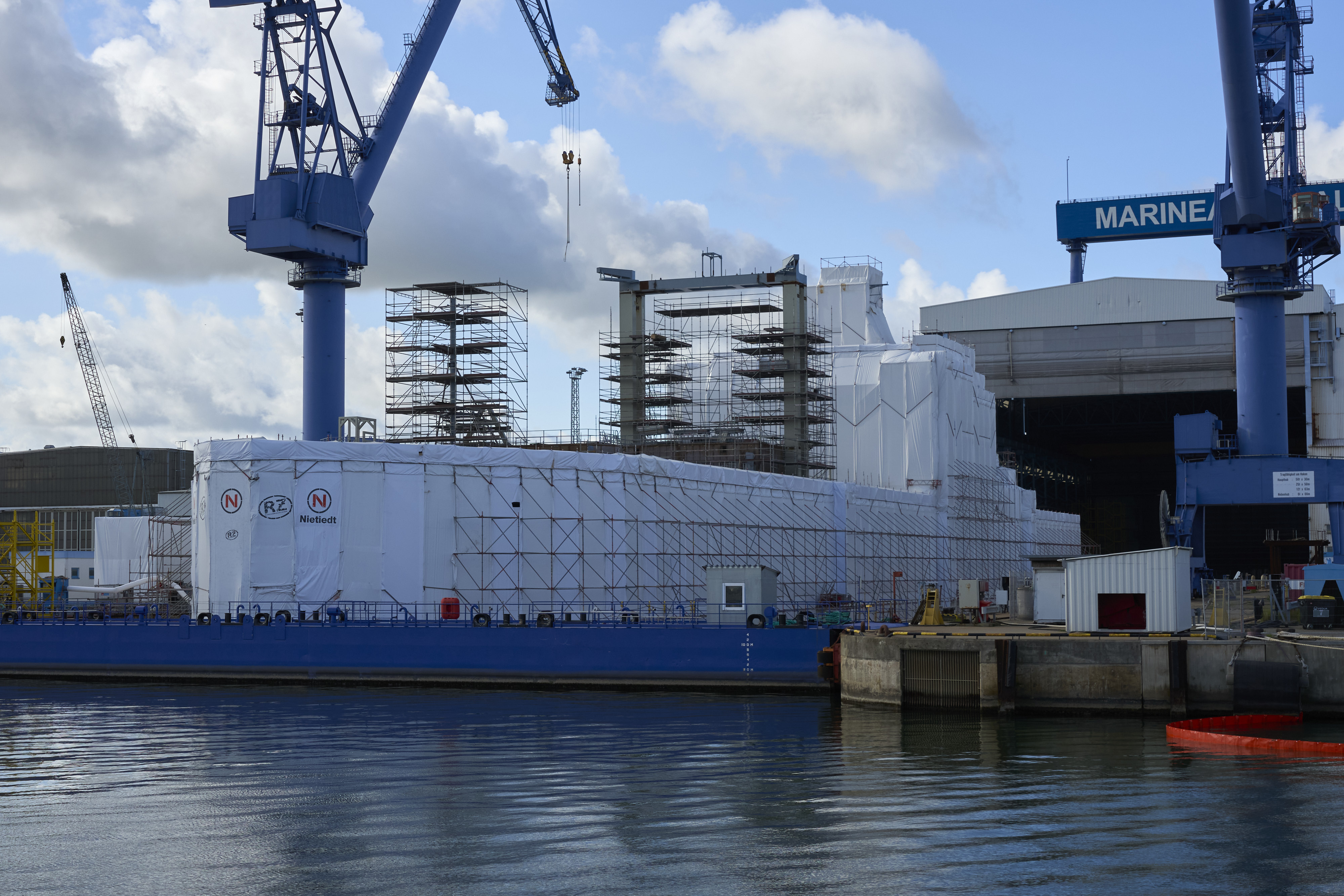
- in the drydock of the Marinearsenal Warnowwerft

Class overview
- Builders: NVL Group and the main subcontractors: Meyer Werft (shipyard Papenburg); Neptun Werft (shipyard Warnemünde); Stahlbau Nord (shipyard Bremerhaven)
- Operators: German Navy
- Preceded by: Rhön class
- Cost: > €900 million (for 2 ships)
- In service: Planned to enter service in 2025 / 2026
- Planned: 2
- Building: 2

General characteristics
- Type: Replenishment tanker
- Displacement: >20,000 t (20,000 long tons)
- Length: 173 m (567 ft 7 in)
- Beam: 24 m (78 ft 9 in)
- Draught: 8 m (26 ft 3 in)
- Speed: 20 knots (37 km/h; 23 mph)
- Capacity: Diesel: 13,000 m^{3} (460,000 cu ft); Containers: 10 × 20 ft containers
- Complement: Crew: 42; Additional contingent capacity: 23
- Aviation facilities: Helicopter deck

The Type 707 tankers are a series of replenishment oilers under construction for the German Navy to provide underway replenishment for its ships at sea. Procurement of two vessels was announced in July 2019, with delivery intended in 2025 to replace the Rhön-class tankers which are scheduled to be retired that same year.

== Project history ==
=== Background ===
The Rhön-class tankers required a replacement due to environmental concerns and their reliability decreasing due to the age of the fleet (in service since 1977). The procurement project was decided in July 2019, with the intend back then to enter service in 2024.

With this purchase, the German Navy will be equipped with 3 Berlin-class replenishment ships and 2 Type 707-class tankers.

==== Tender ====
The tender process started in 2019. The German Navy provided their requirements for this class. The following table compares it to the Rhön-class tankers:

Type 707 requirements
Parameters	Rhön-class tankers (Type 704)	Planned Type 707
	Requirements	
Fuel capacity	11,500 t (25,400,000 lb)	> 15,000 t (33,000,000 lb)
Containers	2	20
Speed	16 kn (30 km/h)	20 kn (37 km/h)
Complement	42	
	Dimensions	
Displacement	20,000 t (44,000,000 lb)	> 20,000 t (44,000,000 lb)
Length	130 m (426 ft 6 in)	~ 170 m (557 ft 9 in)
Beam	19 m (62 ft 4 in)	~ 24 m (78 ft 9 in)
Draft	8 m (26 ft 3 in)	~ 8 m (26 ft 3 in)
	Other parameters	
Hull type	—	Double hull
Lifespan	2024	Beyond the 2050s

==== Selection ====
The competition saw five German shipyards competing for the contract, among which four shipyards are known:

- Flensburger Schiffbau-Gesellschaft (Flensburg)
- German Naval Yards (Kiel)
- MV Werften (Wismar, Stralsund, Rostock-Warnemünde)
- NVL Group (Bremen-Vegesack)

MV Werften and NVL Group were pre-selected as of April 2021, but the €550 million budget limit was not sufficient, and the bids of the two finalists were still €300 million above the target.

The 23 June 2021, the budget committee approved the project for the Type 707 tanker, and the contract was later on signed with the NVL Group. The budget is above €900 million for the two ships.

=== Construction ===
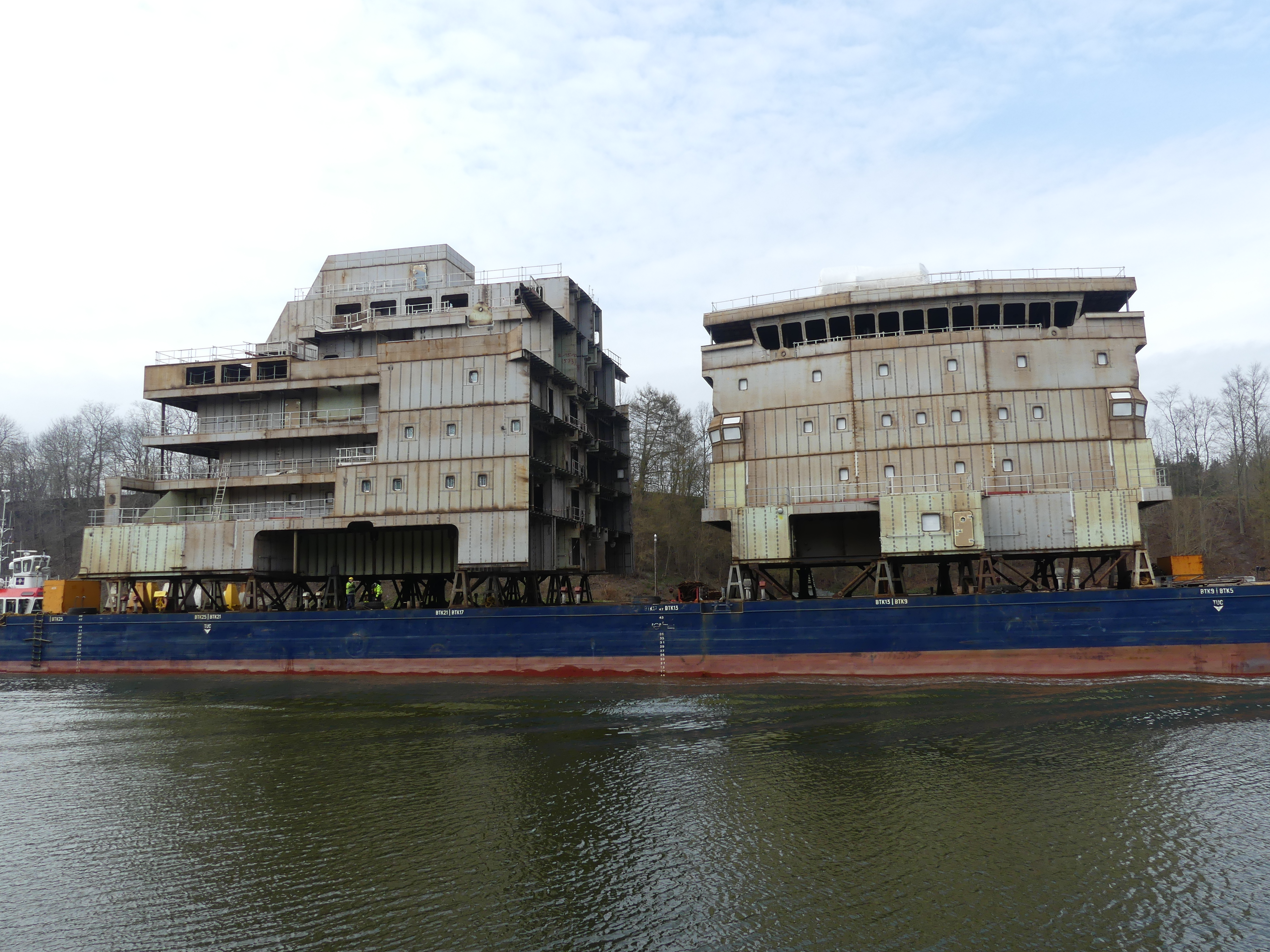
First MBV 707 - superstructure in transport from the Meyer Werft shipyard in Papenburg to the Neptun Werft shipyard in Warnemünde.

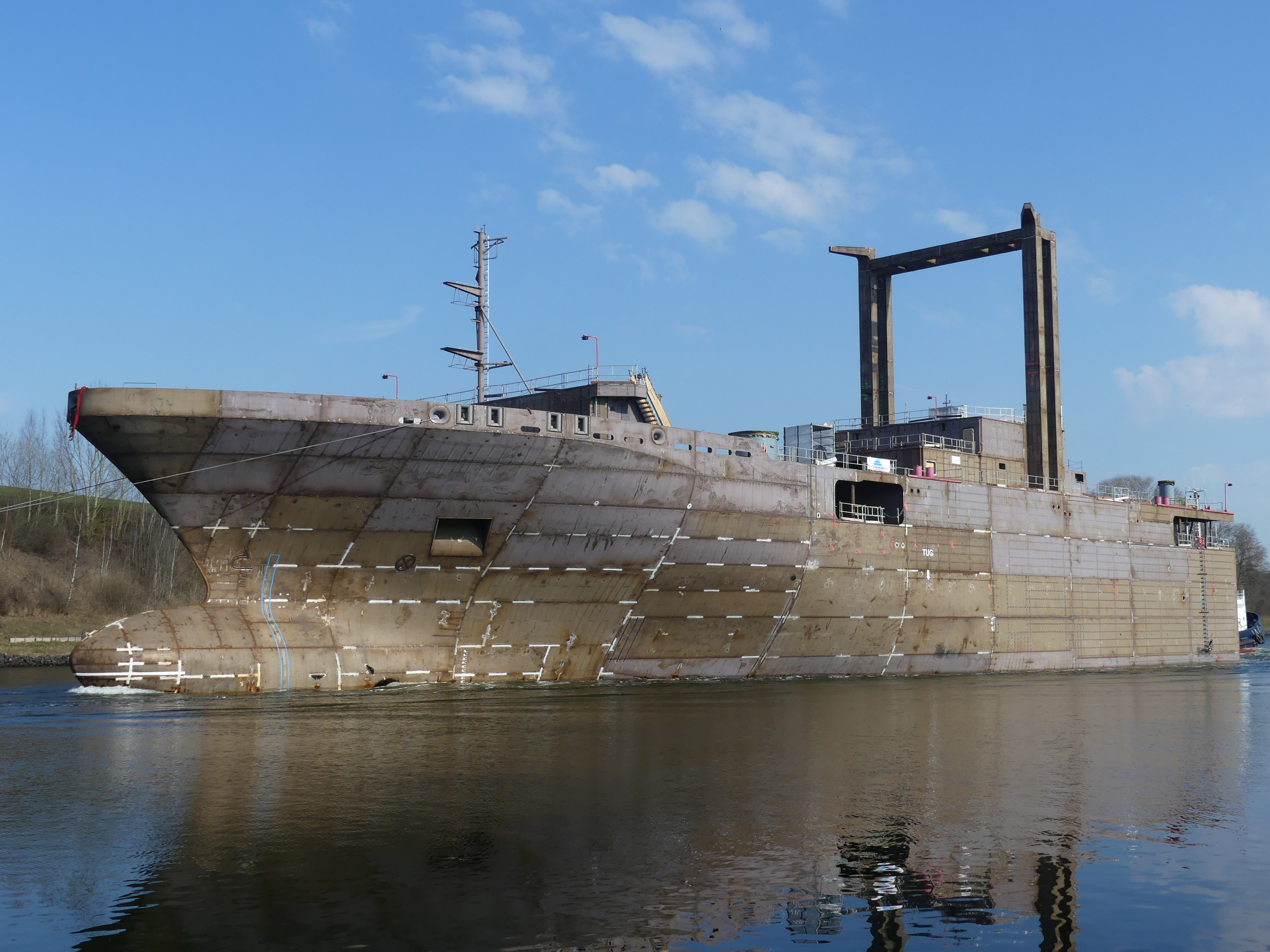
Hull of the second ship afloat in the Kiel Canal

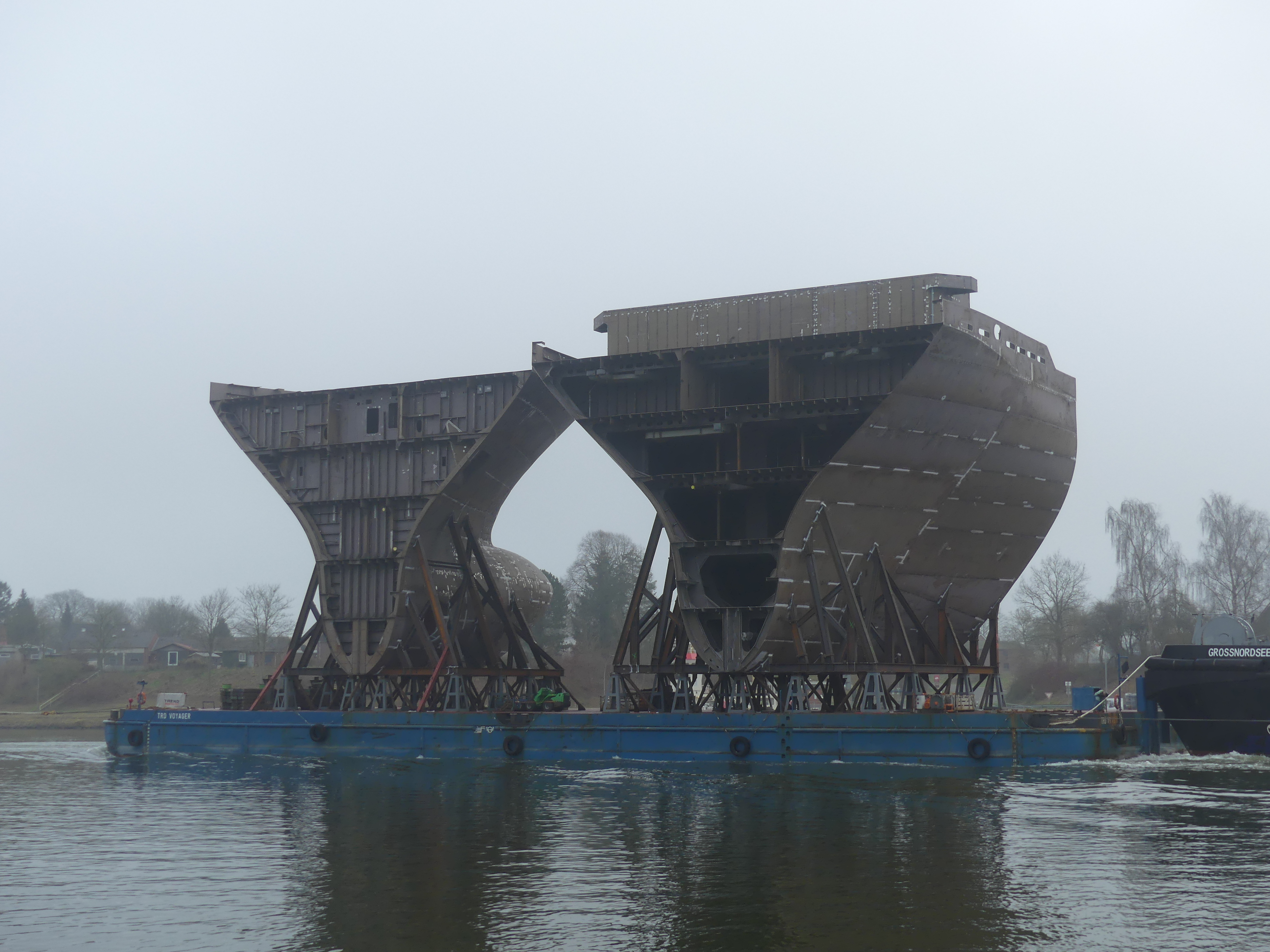
Bow of the second ship made by Stahlbau Nord, in the Kiel Canal

The NVL Group is the general contractor of the project and it collaborates with the Meyer Neptun Group for the construction of the ships. Two subsidiaries of the Meyer Neptun Group constructed the ships:

- The Neptun Werft shipyard in Warnemünde manufactured the entire hull of the first ship, and front part of the hull of the second ship.
- The Meyer Werft shipyard in Papenburg manufactured the superstructure of the two ships, and the rear part of the hull of the second ship due to a lack of production capacity by Neptun Werft.

Among the other main subcontractors are the Stahlbau Nord shipyard in Bremerhaven which built some sections of the ships.

==== First ship ====
The construction started the 29 June 2023 at the Meyer Werft shipyard in Papenburg with

the cutting of the first steel plate. The keel was laid the 8 August 2023 at the Neptun Werft shipyard in Warnemünde.

==== Second ship ====
The construction started the 29 February 2024 at the Meyer Werft shipyard in Papenburg with the cutting of the first steel plate. The keel was laid the 25 April 2024 at the Neptun Werft shipyard in Warnemünde.

The front part of the hull was transferred to the Meyer Werft shipyard in Papenburg in March 2025.

== List of ships ==
Name	No.	Builder	Status	Contract	Laid down	Launched	Comm.	Notes
Deutsche Marine (2 ordered)
–	–	Meyer Neptun Group (Neptun Werft and Meyer Werft)	In production	Jun 2021	8 Aug 2023	–	2025	
–	–	Meyer Neptun Group (Neptun Werft and Meyer Werft)	In production	Jun 2021	25 Apr 2024	–	2026	

Planned commissioning

== See also ==
- List of German Navy ships
- List of active German Navy ships
