= German tanker Rhön =

Rhön-class tanker

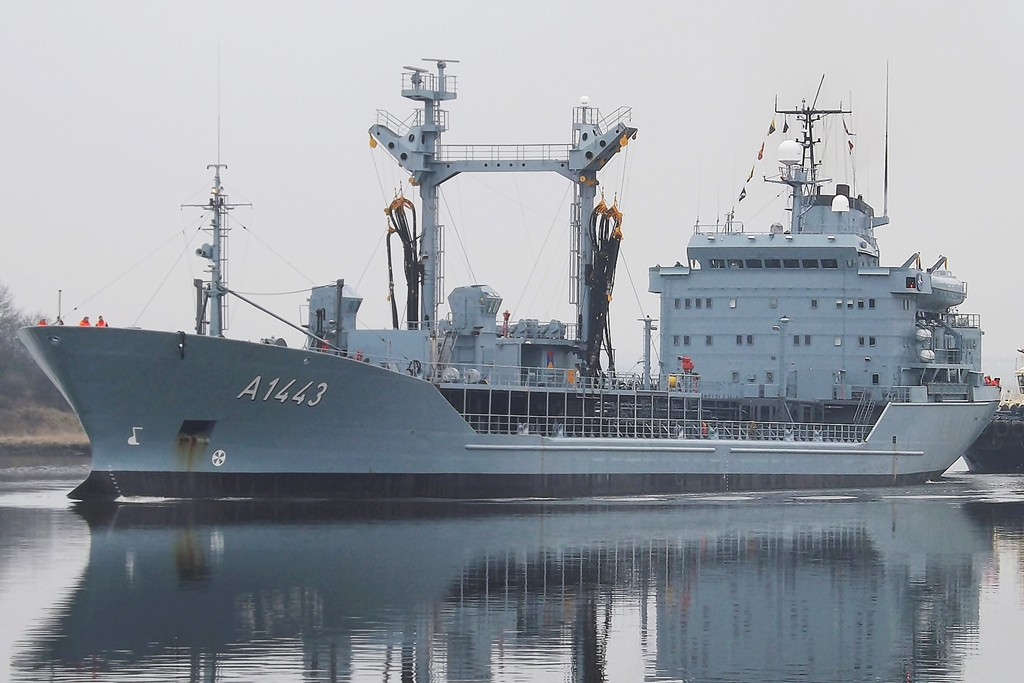
- Rhön on 11 April 2013

History

Germany
- Name: Rhön
- Namesake: Rhön
- Owner: Deutsche Marine
- Port of registry: Hamburg, Germany
- Builder: Kröger, Rendsburg
- Launched: 23 August 1974
- Acquired: 1976
- Commissioned: 23 September 1977
- Renamed: Okene
- Home port: Wilhelmshaven, Germany
- Identification: IMO number: 7362067; MMSI number: 211211840; Callsign: DRKM; Pennant number: A1443
- Status: Active

General characteristics
- Type: Rhön-class tanker
- Tonnage: 6,103 GRT; 10,800 DWT
- Displacement: 14,396 t (14,169 long tons)
- Length: 130.2 m (427 ft 2 in)
- Beam: 19.3 m (63 ft 4 in)
- Draught: 8.7 m (28 ft 7 in)
- Installed power: 1 MaK 12-cylinder diesel engine; 5,880 kW (7,890 hp)
- Propulsion: 1 shaft, controllable pitch propeller
- Speed: 16 knots (30 km/h; 18 mph)
- Range: 3,250 nmi (6,020 km; 3,740 mi) at 12 knots (22 km/h; 14 mph)
- Capacity: 11,000 m^{3} (390,000 cu ft) (fuel); 400 m^{3} (14,000 cu ft) (water)
- Complement: 42 (civilian)

Rhön (A1443) is the lead ship of the Rhön-class tankers of the German Navy. She was commissioned at Kiel, Germany on 23 September 1977.

== Construction and career ==
Rhön was originally built for civilian service by Kröger of Rendsburg in 1974. On 23 September 1977 she was commissioned into the German Navy, based at Kiel, Germany.

On 23 October 1988, Rhön was in collision with the American destroyer USS Hayler, badly damaging Hayler's stern.

Rhön participated in BALTOPS 2020.
