= Diana Beresford-Kroeger =

Irish botanist

- Born: July 25, 1944 (age 82); Islington, England
- Citizenship: Canadian, Irish, British
- Education: University College Cork; University of Connecticut; University of Ottawa; Carleton University
- Spouse: Christian H. Kroeger
- Scientific career
- Fields: Botany, biochemistry, cardiac hemodilution
- Thesis: Frost Resistance and Gibberellins in the Plant Kingdom (University College Cork, 1965); Myocardial Ischemia (Carleton University, 2018)
- Website: dianaberesford-kroeger.com

Diana Bernadette Beresford-Kroeger (born July 25, 1944) is an Irish botanist, medical biochemist, polymath, and author, who was born in Islington, London, England, and resides near Ottawa, Ontario, Canada.

She is known for her ability to bring an understanding and appreciation of the scientific complexities of nature to the general public. In the foreword to one of her books, Arboretum America, a Philosophy of the Forest, E. O. Wilson wrote, "Diana Beresford-Kroeger is one of the rare individuals who can accomplish this outwardly simple but inwardly complex and difficult translation from the non-human to human realms".

== Early life ==
Beresford-Kroeger was orphaned at a young age and raised in Ireland by a bachelor uncle, Patrick O'Donoghue, who was a noted athlete, chemist, scholar, and bibliophile. He nurtured her quest for knowledge and encouraged her to read and discuss everything from Irish poetry, world religions, and philosophy, to physics and quantum mechanics. She attended private schools in Ireland and England. Her summers were spent in the countryside in West Cork and Kerry, which is where she received the lessons of her folk lineage. A great-aunt taught her the early Irish Brehon law as well as Druidic philosophy and ancient ethnobotanical medicine.

== Education ==
Beresford-Kroeger completed her undergraduate studies at University College Cork (UCC), was graduated first in her year (1963) with a Bachelor of Science first class honours in both botany and medical biochemistry. She completed a Master of Science degree at UCC in 1965. Her thesis was “Frost Resistance and Gibberellins in the Plant Kingdom”. She applied scientific testing to plant and human properties held in common. Her PhD thesis completed in 1972 was "The Importance of Indole metabolism in plants and its significance in the human condition".

She received a fellowship at the University of Connecticut to study nuclear radiation in biological systems and organic chemistry.

While engaged in cardiovascular research (1973), she completed a diploma in experimental general surgery from the department of surgery at the University of Ottawa. Beresford-Kroeger completed a PhD in biology at Carleton University in 2018. Her thesis was entitled “Myocardial Ischemia and the use of non-typing artificial blood in hemodilution”.

== Early work ==
Beresford-Kroeger worked as a research scientist at the University of Ottawa and then at the Canadian Department of Agriculture Electron Microscopy Centre, where she discovered cathodoluminescence in biological materials (1972).

From 1973 to 1982, she conducted research at the University of Ottawa physiology department in conjunction with the Ottawa Heart Institute, specializing in hemodynamics. This work led to more efficient organ transplants, cancer delivery of chemotherapy and oxygenation of damaged cardiac musculature.

== Later work ==
In the early 1980s, Beresford-Kroeger refused a professorship in medicine to embark on a significant change in her life work. It began with an expansion of her private research garden and arboretum, Carrigliath. Having identified an absence in the scientific community of the ability to present science to the public and the urgent need to address the degradation of nature, she began her career in writing, broadcasting, and lecturing. Flowing from her research and experience at Carrigliath, Beresford-Kroeger published more than 200 articles in magazines, journals, and newspapers in Canada, the United States, and internationally. She also published seven critically acclaimed books on nature.

Her ideas on medical aerosols have recently been confirmed through rigorous scientific analysis of the clinical trials of Dr. Qing Li and the physics of Dr. Mikael Ehn et al.

She has served as a scientific advisor to a number of organizations, including the Irish Woodland League, Ecology Ottawa, Hidden Harvest of Ottawa, Canadian Organic Growers, Archangel Ancient Tree Archive, the Acadian Forest Research Centre, and others.

Beresford-Kroeger has lectured widely throughout Canada, the United States, Europe, and Japan and has appeared on television and radio in North America, Europe, and elsewhere.

The theatrical documentary, Call of the Forest: The Forgotten Wisdom of Trees, released in 2016, was based on Beresford-Kroeger's book, The Global Forest. The documentary film was produced by Jeff Mckay, Edgeland Films, Merit Motion Pictures, and Treespeak Films. Beresford-Kroeger was principal presenter and created the Director's script. This film is accompanied by an extensive educational app on tree planting in North America, also developed by Beresford-Kroeger http://calloftheforest.ca/. She has also been featured in a number of documentaries including in a film on biodiversity produced by The Government of Canada and a documentary, The Truth About Trees, produced and directed by Ross Spears.

Beresford-Kroeger's book, To Speak for the Trees, inspired the 2024 album release, Trees.Listen, by composers Frank Horvat and Sharlene Wallace. The album, along with a subsequent sound installation, features music for lever harp and fixed electronics. Each piece is named after a letter in the ancient Ogham alphabet, with each letter corresponding to—and inspired by—a specific tree.

== Books ==
- A Garden for Life: The Natural Approach to Designing, Planting, and Maintaining a North Temperate Garden, University of Michigan Press, 2004, previously published as Bioplanning a North Temperate Garden, Quarry Press, 1999 ISBN 978-0-472-03012-5
- Arboretum America: A Philosophy of the Forest, University of Michigan Press, 2003 ISBN 978-0-472-06851-7
- Time Will Tell: Stories of the Rideau Valley, Quarry Press, 2004 ISBN 978-1-55082-343-1
- Arboretum Borealis: A Lifeline of the Planet, University of Michigan Press, 2010 ISBN 978-0-472-05114-4
- The Global Forest: Forty Ways Trees Can Save Us, Viking Penguin, 2010 ISBN 0-14-312016-6
- The Sweetness of a Simple Life: Tips for Healthier, Happier and Kinder Living Gleaned from the Wisdom and Science of Nature, Random House LLC, 2013 ISBN 978-0-345-81295-7
- International Handbook of Forest Therapy, Cambridge Scholars Press, 2019 ISBN 978-1-5275-3955-6
- To Speak for The Trees: My Life’s Journey from Ancient Celtic Wisdom to a Healing Vision of the Forest, Random House Canada, 2019. ISBN 978-0-7352-7507-2
- Our Green Heart: The Soul and Science of Forests: Random House Canada, 2024. ISBN 978-1-039-00979-0
- Tree – Exploring the Arboreal World, Phaidon Press Inc., 2024 ISBN 978-1-83866-779-5. Dr. Beresford-Kroeger served as an international advisory expert for the production of this monumental work on trees.

== Recognition ==
- 2004: Arbour Day Foundation Award for Arboretum America: A Philosophy of the Forest, University of Michigan Press, 2003
- 2010: Elected Fellow by Wings WorldQuest, an international organization "dedicated to recognizing and supporting visionary women"
- 2011: Selected by the Utne Reader as one of their Utne reader Visionaries for 2011
- 2013: Elected to the College of Fellows of the Royal Canadian Geographical Society
- 2019: The Board of Governors and Senate of Carleton University recognized Beresford-Kroeger's outstanding efforts toward preserving the Earth's climate and forests through use of ethical, scientific, and traditional concepts, by conferring upon her the degree of Doctor of Laws, honoris causa.
- 2019: The Sigurd F. Olson Nature Writing Award, Northland College, Ashland Wisconsin
- 2023: The Louie Kamookak Medal, The Royal Canadian Geographic Society.
- 2023: The Distinguished Alumnus Award, University College Cork, Ireland.
- 2024: The 2023 Cincinnati Zoo and Botanical Garden Wildlife Conservation Award, Cincinnati, Ohio.
- 2025: Honorary Membership, Ontario Association of Landscape Architects, Ottawa, Ontario.
- 2025: Ottawa Famous 5 Award – Climate Visionary Scientist, Famous 5 Foundation & Carleton University, Ottawa, Ontario.
- 2025: The Mabel Francis Whitmore Award, Nature Canada, Ottawa, Ontario.

== Personal life ==
Beresford-Kroeger and her husband live outside of Ottawa, Canada on a large property of 200 acres, preserving rare and native trees.
