= Kroger (surname) =

Kroger is a German surname, a variant of Krüger or a spelling of Kröger without diacritics. Notable people with the surname include:

- Bernard Kroger (1860–1938), American businessman who created the Kroger chain of supermarkets
- Chris Kroger (born 1968), American ski mountaineer
- Harry Kroger, American physicist and electrical engineer
- Helen Kroger (born 1959), former Australian politician
- Henry Kroger (1906–1987), Australian cricketer
- Jacob Kroger (died 1594), German goldsmith working for Anne of Denmark
- John Kroger (born 1966), Oregon politician
- Lona Cohen (1913–1992), Soviet spy known by the alias Helen Kroger
- Max Kroger (1899–1989), Australian rules footballer
- Michael Kroger (born 1957), businessman and a powerbroker within the Victorian division of the Liberal Party of Australia
- Mike Kroger (born 1951), American former politician
- Morris Cohen (spy) (1910–1995), known by the alias Peter Kroger
- William S. Kroger (1906–1995), psychiatrist and authority on hypnotism, hypnotherapy, and psychosomatic medicine

== Fictional ==
- Charles Kroger, a character in the police TV drama Monk
