= Rhön-class tanker =

1977 class of German naval tankers

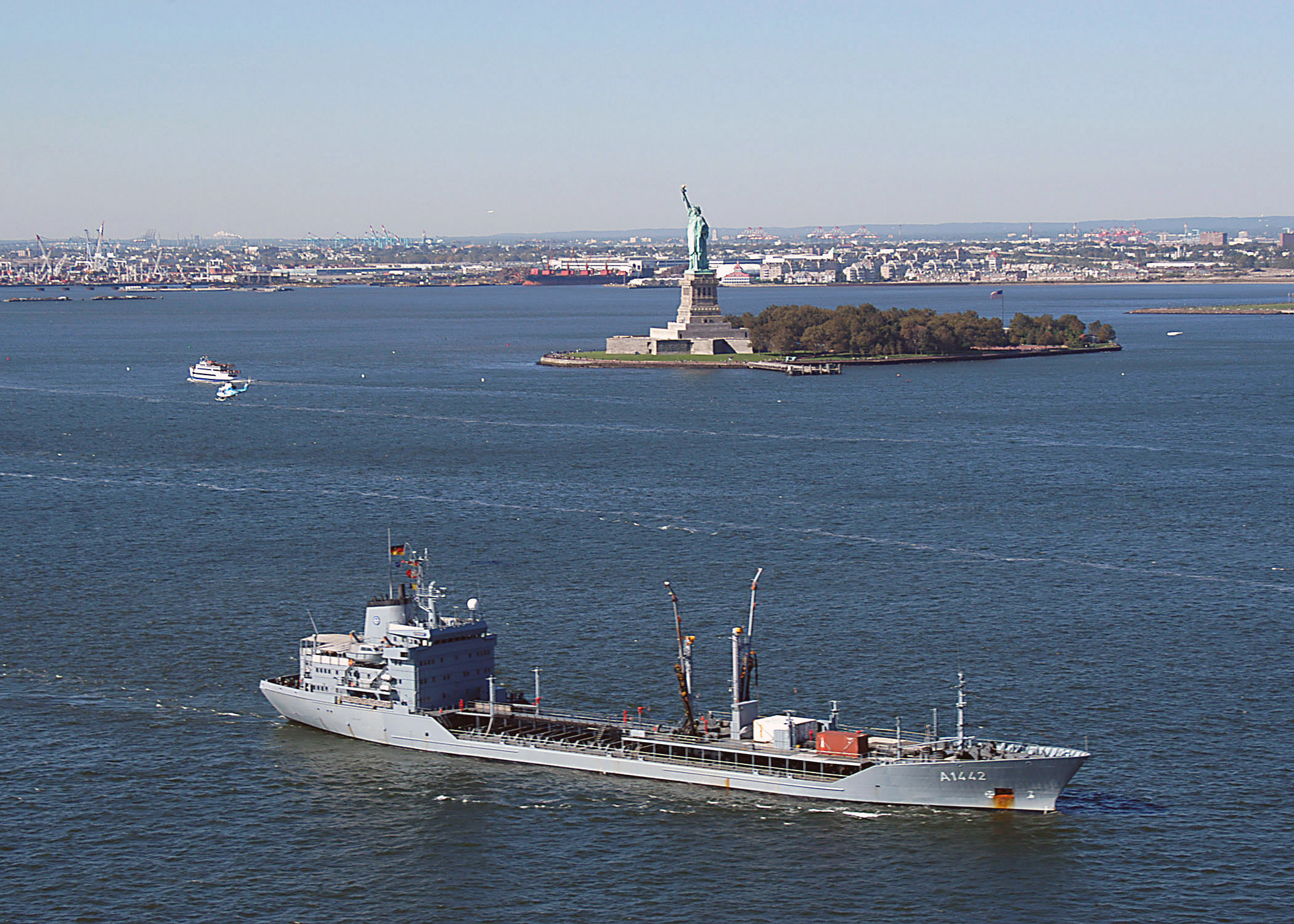
- Spessart entering New York Harbor

Class overview
- Name: Type 704 Rhönclass
- Builders: Kröger, Rendsburg
- Operators: German Navy
- Succeeded by: Type 707
- In service: 1977–present
- Completed: 2
- Active: 2

General characteristics
- Type: Replenishment tanker
- Tonnage: 6,103 GRT; 10,800 DWT
- Displacement: 14,396 t (14,169 long tons)
- Length: 130.2 m (427 ft 2 in)
- Beam: 19.3 m (63 ft 4 in)
- Draught: 8.7 m (28 ft 7 in)
- Installed power: 1 MaK 12-cylinder diesel engine; 5,880 kW (7,890 hp)
- Propulsion: 1 shaft, controllable pitch propeller
- Speed: 16 knots (30 km/h; 18 mph)
- Range: 3,250 nmi (6,020 km; 3,740 mi) at 12 knots (22 km/h; 14 mph)
- Capacity: 11,000 m^{3} (390,000 cu ft) (fuel); 400 m^{3} (14,000 cu ft) (water)
- Complement: 42 (civilian)

The Type 704 Rhön-class tankers are a series of replenishment oilers used by the German Navy to provide underway replenishment for its ships at sea. The two vessels in the class, Rhön and Spessart, were originally constructed for Libya by Kröger Shipyard in Rendsburg, West Germany as bulk acid carriers. They were acquired by the West German Navy in 1976 for conversion and entered service in 1977. The two ships are crewed by civilians. In 2019 it was announced by the German Navy that the ships are planned to be replaced in 2024.

== Design and description ==
The Type 704 replenishment ships, originally constructed as civilian tankers, have a full load displacement of 14,396 tonnes (14,169 long tons) and were measured at 6,103 gross register tons (GRT) and 10,800 tons deadweight (DWT). They are 130.2 metres (427 ft 2 in) long with a beam of 19.3 metres (63 ft 4 in) and a draught of 8.7 metres (28 ft 7 in). They have capacity for 11,000 m^{3} (2,400,000 imp gal) of fuel oil and 400 m^{3} (88,000 imp gal) of water.

The Rhön class are powered by one MaK 12-cylinder diesel engine turning one shaft with a controllable pitch propeller, rated at 5,880 kilowatts (7,890 hp). This gives the vessels in the class a maximum speed of 16 knots (30 km/h; 18 mph) and a range of 3,250 nautical miles (6,020 km; 3,740 mi) at 12 knots (22 km/h; 14 mph). The ships are civilian crewed and have a complement of 42. The ships have two positions for portable surface-to-air missiles.

== Ship list ==
Rhön class construction data
Pennant	Name	Builder	Commissioned	Homeport	Status
A1443	Rhön (ex-Okene)	Kröger, Rendsburg, West Germany	23 September 1977	Wilhelmshaven	In service
A1442	Spessart (ex-Okapi)	Kröger, Rendsburg, West Germany	5 September 1977	Kiel	In service

== Service history ==
Two bulk acid tankers were ordered by Libya as Okene and Okapi from Kröger at their yard in Rendsburg, West Germany. Okene was launched on 23 August 1974 and Okapi on 13 February 1975. While still under construction, the two ships were acquired by the West German Navy in 1976 for conversion to naval replenishment tankers. Okene was converted by Kröger and was renamed Rhön for a mountain range in Germany. Okapi was taken to Bremerhaven for conversion and renamed Spessart, also a mountain range in Germany. Both ships entered service in 1977.

On 1 April 2009, pirates operating off the Somalian coast mistook Spessart as a commercial tanker and opened fire on it before attempting to board the ship. The attack was repelled and the pirates were chased by several naval ships, eventually being captured by a Greek frigate. The pirates were handed over to the German frigate Rheinland-Pfalz to be prosecuted. In July 2018, it was announced that both vessels of the class were laid up due to heavy maintenance required to get them back into service and that Spessart's engine would require a complete overhaul.

== New replenishment oilers ==
The outdated tankers were planned to be replaced. The Bundestag approved money for this in 2021. The Federal Ministry of Defence made numerous mistakes in awarding the contract. The ministry did not put the contract out to tender throughout Europe, but only within Germany. Neighbouring countries such as Norway and Great Britain bought comparable ships for a fraction of the German price. The ministry justified this with strategic reasons. The contract for the construction of two new tankers was awarded to the Lürssen Shipyard (Naval Vessels Lürssen NVL), Bremen in July 2021. At that point, it was already clear that the price demanded by NVL was too expensive. In order to reduce costs, the Bundeswehr accepted poorer technical equipment for the ships: no second drive shaft was installed and the capacity of the tankers was reduced. The ships were at least 250 million Euros too expensive. The new ships will be built at Neptun Werft, Rostock.
