= Kroeger =

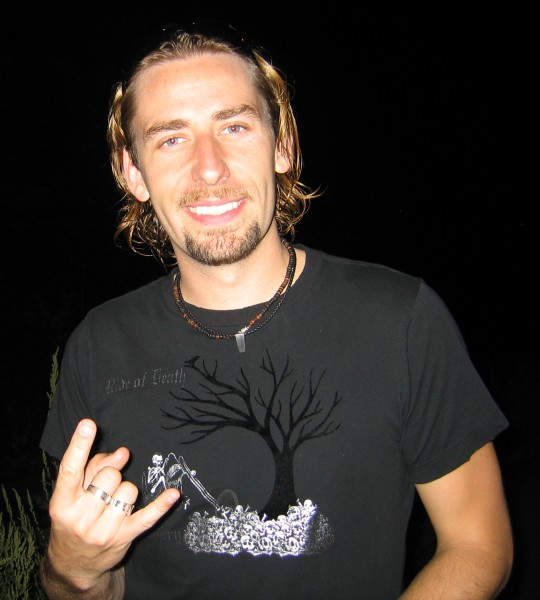
- Chad Kroeger of the rock band Nickelback

Kröger or Kroeger is a German surname, variant of Kruger. Notable people with the surname include:

- Adolph Ernst Kroeger (1837–1882), American translator
- Arthur Kroeger (1932–2008), Canadian academic and civil servant
- Bernd J. Kröger (born 1959), German phonetician and professor
- Berry Kroeger (1912–1991), American actor
- Catherine Clark Kroeger (1925–2011), American writer
- Chad Kroeger (born 1974), Canadian musician, lead vocalist and guitarist of Nickelback
- Diana Beresford-Kroeger (born 1944), Irish botanist
- Erhard Kroeger (1905–1987), German SS officer
- Ernst R. Kroeger (1862–1934), American composer
- Eva-Maria Kröger (born 1982), German politician
- Gary Kroeger (born 1957), American actor, former cast member of Saturday Night Live
- Heiko Kröger (born 1966), German Paralympic sailor
- Henry Kroeger (1917–1987), Canadian politician
- Herman Kroeger (1831–1916), politician from Wisconsin
- Johann Kroeger (1754-1823), Mennonite clockmaker
- Josh Kroeger (born 1982), American baseball player
- Jürgen Kröger (1856–1928), German architect
- Kai Kroeger (born 2002), American football player
- Karl Kroeger (born 1932), American composer and music professor
- Matthias Kröger (born 1969), German motorcycle racer
- Mieke Kröger (born 1993), German track and road racing cyclist
- Meike Kröger (born 1986), German track and field athlete
- Suzanne Kröger (born 1976), Dutch political scientist and politician
- Thomas Kröger (born 1979), German volleyball player
- Uwe Kröger (born 1964), German musician
- Wolfgang Kröger, (born 1945), professor

== Fictional characters ==
- Tonio Kröger, the protagonist of Tonio Kröger, a 1901 novella by Thomas Mann and of a 1964 film with the same name

== See also ==
- Kroger (disambiguation)
- Kroeger Clocks
- Kroeker
