= Kroeger Clocks =

Mennonite clockmaker family

The Kroeger family of Mennonite clockmakers, better known as Kroeger Clocks, was a well-known clockmaking family, the earliest recorded of whom was Peter D. Kroeger from Reimerswalde, near Danzig, Prussia in the mid-1700s.

The clockmaking continued with Johann Kroeger, who moved in the late 18th century in the mass Mennonite migration to the Russian Empire and established his shop in Rosenthal, Chortitza, Ukraine. The clocks were made by five generations of the Kroeger family until the early 20th century and are known their high quality and elaborate design. The clocks were wall-hanging clocks and rope-driven, in the early years, often with floral patterns on the dial. Most Mennonite families had one of these clocks as they were often given as wedding presents and were passed on among Russian Mennonite families as valued heirlooms and collector's items. Other Mennonite clock-makers include Lepp, Hildebrandt, Mandtler, and Hamm.

The Kroeger Clock Heritage Foundation was established to preserve these and other Mennonite clocks, and has sponsored exhibits including the 2018 exhibit at Mennonite Heritage Village museum in Steinbach, Manitoba and others.
