= Jeanette Morang =

First female flag officer in the Royal Netherlands Navy

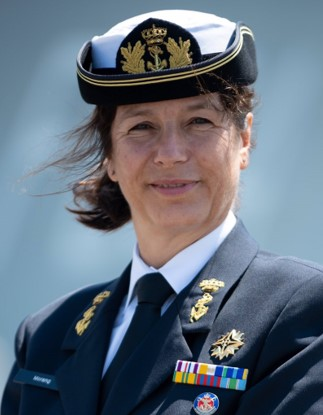
Commodore Jeanette Morang (2019)

Commodore Jeanette Morang (12 May 1965) is an active Dutch officer in the Royal Netherlands Navy.

Enlisting in 1983, Morang completed training as a naval officer at the Royal Naval Institute in 1986. She has held a number of ship and shore based appointments. In 1997, Morang commanded the minehunter HNLMS Alkmaar. From 1999 to 2003 she was head of intelligence and operations for the Netherlands Antilles and Aruba Coast Guard. (Note: Under the operational control of the Navy and is commanded by the commander of the Navy in the Caribbean.)

Morang was the first female frigate commander in the Royal Netherlands Navy. On 12 January 2007, at 41 years of age, Morang was appointed as commander of the air defense and command frigate (LCF) HNLMS De Ruyter (F804). She held this appointment until July 2009. After that, she worked on the staff of Commander Naval Forces in The Hague until 2013 and as a liaison officer with NATO in Brussels. (Note: There was essentially no information regarding Morang's career following her appointment to commanding HNLMS De Ruyter.)

On 14 June 2019, Morang was promoted to the rank of commodore. This made her the first female flag officer in the Royal Netherlands Navy. On 24 June 2019 Morang was appointed Commander Surface Forces NATO (COMSURFNATO). (Note: Morang succeeded Rear Admiral Jens Nemeyer of the German Navy.)

== Personal life ==
Morang is married and has a son.
