= List of German Navy ships =

The list of Germany Navy ships includes all ships commissioned into German Navy service, since the reunification of Germany in 1990.

See also:

- List of naval ships of Germany for naval ships which have served Germany throughout the country's history.
- List of German Navy ship classes
- List of current German frigates

== Surface combatants ==
- Destroyers
  - 101A (Hamburg class) (decommissioned)
    - D181 Hamburg
    - D182 Schleswig-Holstein
    - D183 Bayern
    - D184 Hessen
  - 103B (Lütjens class) (decommissioned)
    - D185 Lütjens
    - D186 Mölders
    - D187 Rommel
- Frigates
  - 122 (Bremen class) decommissioned)
    - F207 Bremen
    - F208 Niedersachsen
    - F209 Rheinland-Pfalz
    - F210 Emden
    - F211 Köln
    - F212 Karlsruhe
    - F213 Augsburg
    - F214 Lübeck
  - 123 (Brandenburg class)
    - F215 Brandenburg
    - F216 Schleswig-Holstein
    - F217 Bayern
    - F218 Mecklenburg-Vorpommern
  - 124 (Sachsen class)
    - F219 Sachsen
    - F220 Hamburg
    - F221 Hessen
  - 125 (Baden-Württemberg class)
    - F222 Baden-Württemberg
    - F223 Nordrhein-Westfalen
    - F224 Sachsen-Anhalt
    - F225 Rheinland-Pfalz
- Corvettes
  - 130 (Braunschweig class)
    - F260 Braunschweig
    - F261 Magdeburg
    - F262 Erfurt
    - F263 Oldenburg
    - F264 Ludwigshafen am Rhein
- Fast Attack Craft
  - 143 (Albatross class) (decommissioned)
    - P6111 S61 Albatros
    - P6112 S62 Falke
    - P6113 S63 Geier
    - P6114 S64 Bussard
    - P6115 S65 Sperber
    - P6116 S66 Greif
    - P6117 S67 Kondor
    - P6118 S68 Seeadler
    - P6119 S69 Habicht
    - P6120 S70 Kormoran
  - 143A (Gepard class) (decommissioned)
    - P6121 S71 Gepard
    - P6122 S72 Puma
    - P6123 S73 Hermelin
    - P6124 S74 Nerz
    - P6125 S75 Zobel
    - P6126 S76 Frettchen
    - P6127 S77 Dachs
    - P6128 S78 Ozelot
    - P6129 S79 Wiesel
    - P6130 S80 Hyäne
  - 148 (Tiger class) (decommissioned)
    - P6141 S41 Tiger
    - P6142 S42 Iltis
    - P6143 S43 Luchs
    - P6144 S44 Marder
    - P6145 S45 Leopard
    - P6146 S46 Fuchs
    - P6147 S47 Jaguar
    - P6148 S48 Löwe
    - P6149 S49 Wolf
    - P6150 S50 Panther
    - P6151 S51 Häher
    - P6152 S52 Storch
    - P6153 S53 Pelikan
    - P6154 S54 Elster
    - P6155 S55 Alk
    - P6156 S56 Dommel
    - P6157 S57 Weihe
    - P6158 S58 Pinguin
    - P6159 S59 Reiher
    - P6160 S60 Kranich

== Subsurface combatants ==
- Submarines
  - Type 205 (decommissioned)
    - S191 U-1
    - S192 U-2
    - S188 U-9
    - S189 U-10
    - S190 U-11
    - S191 U-12
  - Type 206A (decommissioned)
    - S170 U-21
    - S171 U-22
    - S172 U-23
    - S173 U-24
    - S174 U-25
    - S175 U-26
    - S176 U-27
    - S177 U-28
    - S178 U-29
    - S179 U-30
    - S192 U-13
    - S193 U-14
    - S194 U-15
    - S195 U-16
    - S196 U-17
    - S197 U-18
    - S198 U-19
    - S199 U-20
  - Type 212A
    - S181 U-31
    - S182 U-32
    - S183 U-33
    - S184 U-34
    - S185 U-35
    - S186 U-36

== Mine warfare vessels ==
- Minehunters
  - 331 (Fulda class) (upgraded Type 320 Lindau class minesweepers, decommissioned)
    - M1086 Fulda (—1992)
    - M1084 Flensburg (1972—1991)
    - M1072 Lindau (1978—2000)
    - M1074 Tübingen (1978—1997)
    - M1085 Minden (1978—1997)
    - M1071 Koblenz (1978—1999)
    - M1075 Wetzlar (1978—1995)
    - M1070 Göttingen (1979—1997)
    - M1077 Weilheim (1978—1995)
    - M1087 Völklingen (1979—1999)
    - M1078 Cuxhaven (1979—2000)
    - M1080 Marburg (1979—2000)
  - 332 (Frankenthal class)
    - M1058 Fulda
    - M1059 Weilheim
    - M1060 Weiden (decommissioned)
    - M1061 Rottweil
    - M1063 Bad Bevensen
    - M1064 Grömitz
    - M1065 Dillingen
    - M1068 Datteln
    - M1069 Homburg
    - M1066 Frankenthal (decommissioned)
    - M1062 Sulzbach-Rosenberg
    - M1067 Bad Rappenau
  - 333 (Kulmbach class) (decommissioned)
    - M1091 Kulmbach
    - M1095 Überherrn
    - M1099 Herten
    - M1096 Passau
    - M1097 Laboe
- Minesweepers (Drone control vessels)
  - 351 (Ulm class) (upgraded Type 320 Lindau class minesweepers, decommissioned)
    - M1083 Ulm (1989—1999)
    - M1073 Schleswig (1989—2000)
    - M1082 Wolfsburg (1989—2000)
    - M1076 Paderborn (1989—2000)
    - M1079 Düren (1989—2000)
    - M1079 Konstanz (1989—2000)
  - 352 (Ensdorf class)
    - M1090 Pegnitz (decommissioned)
    - M1092 Hameln (decommissioned)
    - M1093 Auerbach/Oberpfalz (decommissioned)
    - M1094 Ensdorf
    - M1098 Siegburg
- Mine diver support ships
  - 742 (Mühlhausen class) (decommissioned)
    - M1052 Mühlhausen

== Amphibious warfare ships ==
- Landing craft
  - 520 (Barbe class) (used as transport ships now)
    - L760 Flunder (decommissioned)
    - L761 Karpfen (decommissioned)
    - L762 Lachs
    - L763 Plötze (decommissioned)
    - L764 Rochen (decommissioned)
    - L765 Schlei (decommissioned)
    - L766 Stör (decommissioned)
    - L767 Tümmler (decommissioned)
    - L768 Wels (decommissioned)
    - L769 Zander (decommissioned)
    - L788 Butt (decommissioned)
    - L789 Brasse (decommissioned)
    - L790 Barbe (decommissioned)
    - L791 Delphin (decommissioned)
    - L792 Dorsch (decommissioned)
    - L793 Felchen (decommissioned)
    - L794 Forelle (decommissioned)
    - L795 Inger (decommissioned)
    - L796 Makrele (decommissioned)
    - L797 Muräne (decommissioned)

== Auxiliary ships ==
- Tenders
  - 401 (Rhein class) (decommissioned)
    - A58 Rhein
    - A61 Elbe
    - A63 Main
    - A68 Werra
    - A69 Donau
  - 402 (Mosel class) (decommissioned)
    - A65 Saar
    - A67 Mosel
  - 403 (Lahn class) (decommissioned)
    - A55 Lahn
  - 404 (Elbe class)
    - A511 Elbe
    - A512 Mosel
    - A513 Rhein
    - A514 Werra
    - A515 Main
    - A516 Donau
- Replenishment ships
  - 701 (Lüneburg class) (small replenishment ship, decommissioned)
    - A1411 Lüneburg
    - A1412 Coburg
    - A1413 Freiburg
    - A1414 Glücksburg
    - A1415 Saarburg
    - A1416 Nienburg
    - A1417 Offenburg
    - A1418 Meersburg
  - 702 (Berlin class) (combat support ship)
    - A1411 Berlin
    - A1412 Frankfurt am Main
    - A1413 Bonn
  - 703 (Walchensee class) (small coastal tanker, decommissioned)
    - A1424 Walchensee
    - A1425 Ammersee
    - A1426 Tegernsee
    - A1427 Westensee
  - 704 (Rhön class) (tanker)
    - A1442 Spessart
    - A1443 Rhön
- Transport ships
  - 760 (Westerwald class) (ammunition transport ship, decommissioned)
    - A1435 Westerwald
    - A1436 Odenwald
- Tugboats
  - 720 (Helgoland class)
    - A1457 Helgoland (decommissioned 1997)
    - A1458 Fehmarn
  - 722 (Wangerooge class)
    - A1451 Wangerooge
    - A1452 Spiekeroog
    - A1455 Norderney (decommissioned)
- Icebreaker
  - 721 (Eisvogel class) (decommissioned)
    - A1401 Eisvogel
    - A1402 Eisbär
- Surveillance, (ELINT)
  - 423 (Oste class)
    - A50 Alster
    - A52 Oste
    - A53 Oker
- School ships
  - 441 (Gorch Fock class) (3 mast barque)
    - A60 Gorch Fock II
