= List of current German frigates =

This is a list of frigates currently in service with the German Navy.

== F123 Brandenburg class ==
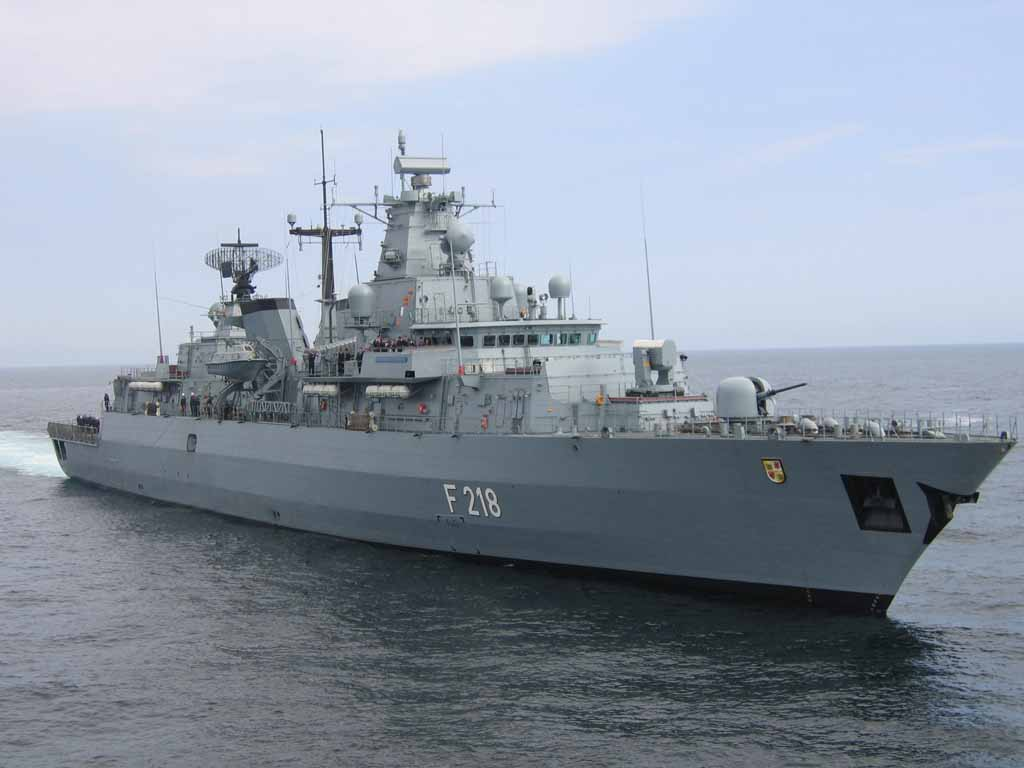
Mecklenburg-Vorpommern, a Brandenburg-class frigate

ASW frigates, 139m/4900t, in service since 1994

Einsatzflottille 2, 2. Fregattengeschwader, Wilhelmshaven:

- F215 Brandenburg
- F216 Schleswig-Holstein
- F217 Bayern
- F218 Mecklenburg-Vorpommern

== F124 Sachsen class ==
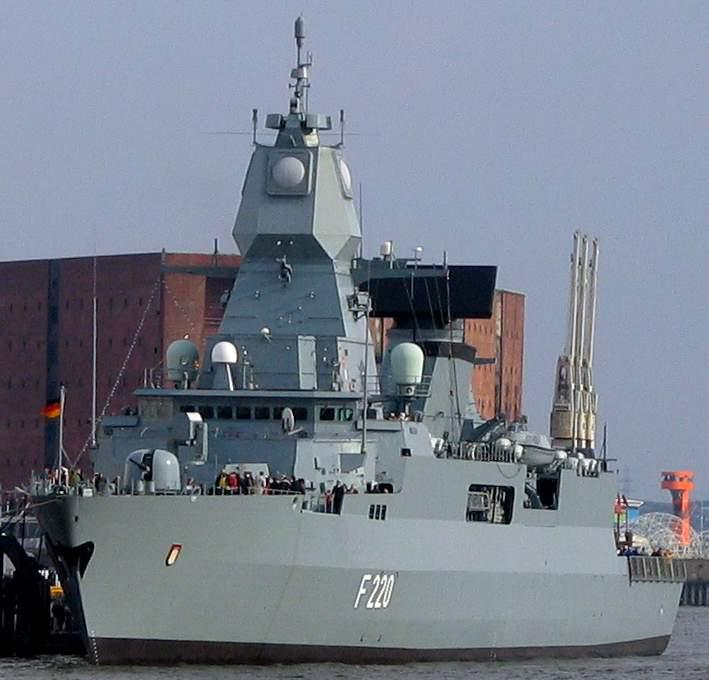
Hamburg, a Sachsen-class frigate

AAW frigates, 143m/5690t, in service since 2004

Einsatzflottille 2, 2. Fregattengeschwader, Wilhelmshaven:

- F219 Sachsen
- F220 Hamburg
- F221 Hessen

== F125 Baden-Württemberg class ==
4 Multi-purpose frigates, optimized for long expeditionary peacemaking/peacekeeping missions, 149,5m/ 7200t, 4 planned to replace the F122 Bremen class

- F222 Baden-Württemberg
- F223 Nordrhein-Westfalen
- F224 Sachsen-Anhalt
- F225 Rheinland-Pfalz

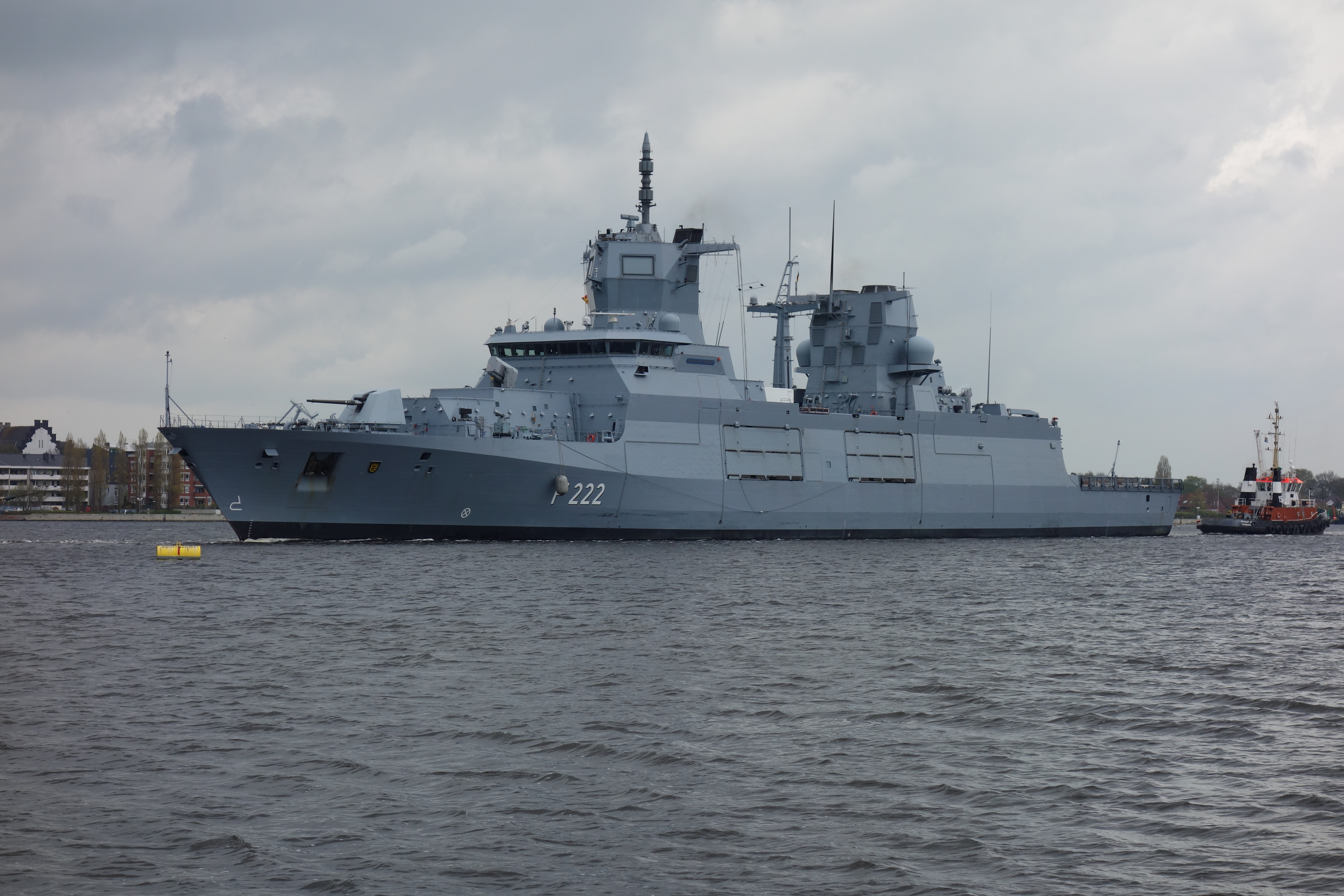
Baden-Württemberg, a Baden-Württemberg-class frigate
