= Einsatzflottille 2 =

German Navy military unit

2nd Flotilla
- Einsatzflottille 2
- Coat of arms of Einsatzflottille 2
- Founded: 27 June 2006; 20 years ago
- Country: Germany
- Branch: German Navy
- Part of: Navy Command (Germany)
- Garrison/HQ: Wilhelmshaven, Lower Saxony, Germany

Commanders
- Current commander: Flotilla admiral Axel Schulz

Einsatzflottille 2 (EinsFltl 2 or EF 2) is one of the three brigade-level units of the German Navy, in addition to Einsatzflottille 1 and the Naval Air Command. It is based in Wilhelmshaven, Lower Saxony, and is subordinated to Navy Command, based in Rostock.

== History ==
Einsatzflottille 2 was set up on June 27, 2006, as part of a major reorganization of the fleet when the previous Zerstörerflotille (Destroyer Flotilla), which was founded on April 1, 1958, as Kommando der Zerstörer (Destroyer Command), was renamed. It mostly consists of the largest units of the fleet, namely frigates and supply ships, together with some smaller support vessels.

== Subordinate units ==
The staff of Einsatzflottille 2 are based at Marinestützpunkt Heppenser Groden, Wilhelmshaven. All of the frigates and some of the supply ships are stationed in Wilhelmshaven, others have their home ports on the Baltic Sea.

=== 2nd Frigate Squadron ===
The first 2. Fregattengeschwader was created on October 1, 1988, succeeding the 2nd Escort Squadron (2. Geleitgeschwader) at the same base. At first, the Bremen-class frigates F211 Köln and F212 Karlsruhe were transferred to the squadron with the 2nd batch, consisting of frigates F213 Augsburg and F214 Lübeck, following in 1989 and 1990 respectively.

The current unit was created on January 9, 2006, when the 1st (Sachsen-class frigates) and the 6th squadrons (Brandenburg-class frigates) were combined to form the new 2nd Frigate Squadron.

- Sachsen-class (124) frigates
  - F219 Sachsen
  - F220 Hamburg
  - F221 Hessen
- Brandenburg-class (123) frigates
  - F215 Brandenburg
  - F216 Schleswig-Holstein
  - F217 Bayern
  - F218 Mecklenburg-Vorpommern

=== 4th Frigate Squadron ===
Created on 16th November 1981, the 4. Fregattengeschwader initially consisted of four Bremen-class frigates. On January 9, 2006, it was merged with the "old" 2nd Frigate Squadron to unite all eight Bremen-class frigates. They are being replaced by four Baden-Württemberg-class frigates intended for overseas peacekeeping missions and special forces support.

- Baden-Württemberg-class (125) frigates
  - F222 Baden-Württemberg
  - F223 Nordrhein-Westfalen
  - F224 Sachsen-Anhalt

=== Auxiliaries Squadron ===
The Troßgeschwader followed the 1st and 2nd Supply Squadrons (1./2. Versorgungsgeschwader) which were transferred to the 2nd Flotilla (then: Destroyer Flotilla) in 1997 after the Supply Flotilla (Versorgungsflotille) was dissolved. The first squadron used to be stationed at Kiel Naval Base, the second in Cuxhaven, supporting navy units in the Baltic and North Seas with liquid and solid consumables. Today, eight ships remain stationed in both Kiel and Wilhelmshaven. Some are manned by navy members and others by civilian crews.

- Berlin-class (702) replenishment-ship
  - A1411 Berlin in Wilhelmshaven
  - A1412 Frankfurt am Main in Wilhelmshaven
  - A1413 Bonn in Wilhelmshaven
- Rhön-class (704) tanker
  - A1443 Rhön in Wilhelmshaven
  - A1442 Spessart in Kiel
- Fehmarn-class (720) tug
  - A1458 Fehmarn in Kiel
- Wangerooge-class (722) tug
  - A1451 Wangerooge in Wilhelmshaven
  - A1452 Spiekeroog in Kiel

=== Naval Base Command Wilhelmshaven ===
The command is responsible for operations and logistics at the Heppenser Groden naval base and directly subordinate to 2nd Flotilla.

== Service ==
The ships of Einsatzflottille 2 are often deployed on overseas assignments, usually as part of the German contribution to the standing NATO squadrons Standing NATO Maritime Group 1 (SNMG 1) and Standing NATO Maritime Group 2 (SNMG 2), and participate in NATO operations in this context. The commander of Einsatzflottille 2 often serves as the leader of national or multinational naval squadrons and is supported in this task by his staff.

Name of Operation	Start of participation	End of participation	Region	Units involved	Notes
Operation Atalanta	December 2008	-	Horn of Africa, Gulf of Aden	Frigates, tankers	
Maritime Task Force (MTF) UNIFIL	October 2006	-	Eastern Mediterranean	Frigates, supply vessels, staff	Commander of EF 2 was for a time commander of the task force
Operation Enduring Freedom	January 2002	June 2010	Horn of Africa, Gulf of Aden	Frigates, tankers, supply vessels, staff	
Operation Active Endeavour	November 2001	October 2016	Mediterranean	Frigates, tankers, supply vessels	Mostly carried out as part of the Standing NATO Maritime Groups, later became Operation Sea Guardian

== Commanders ==
N0.	Name	Start of command	End of command
7	Flotilla Admiral Axel Schulz	24 September 2021	
6	Flotilla Admiral Ralf Kuchler	29 June 2018	24 September 2021
5	Flotilla admiral Christoph Müller-Meinhard	23 March 2015	29 June 2018
4	Flotilla admiral Jürgen zur Mühlen	1 January 2013	20 March 2015
3	Flotilla admiral Thorsten Kähler	1 October 2009	31 December 2012
2	Flotilla admiral Karl-Wilhelm Bollow	1 October 2006	30 September 2009
1	Flotilla admiral Hans-Jochen Witthauer	27 June 2006	30 September 2006
