= German frigate Köln (F211) =

German Naval Frigate

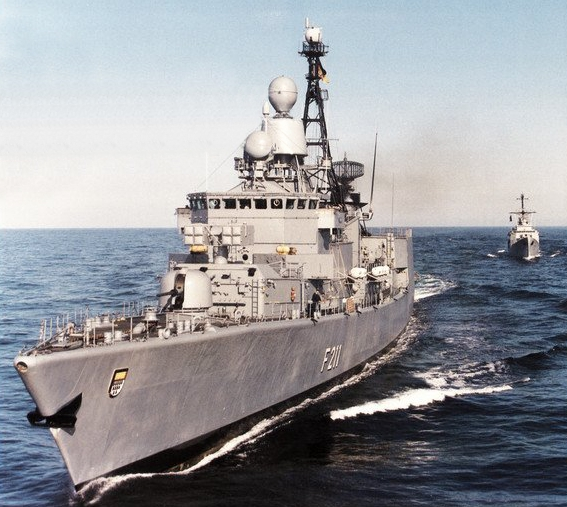
- Köln during NATO Exercise North Star in 1991

History

Germany
- Name: Köln
- Builder: Blohm+Voss, Hamburg
- Laid down: 16 June 1980
- Launched: 29 May 1981
- Commissioned: 19 October 1984
- Decommissioned: 31 July 2012
- Identification: Pennant number: F211; MMSI number: 211210260; Call sign: DRAU
- Fate: To be scrapped

General characteristics
- Class & type: Bremen-class frigate
- Displacement: 3,680 tonnes (3,620 long tons)
- Length: 130.50 m (428 ft 2 in)
- Beam: 14.60 m (47 ft 11 in)
- Draft: 6.30 m (20 ft 8 in)
- Installed power: CODOG (Combined diesel or gas); 2 × MTU 20V956 TB92 diesel engines, 8.14 MW (10,920 hp) total; 2 × General Electric LM2500 gas turbines, 38 MW (51,000 hp) total; 2 × Renk STG 150-50 gearboxes, 10:1 (diesel) and 720:47 (turbine); 4 × Deutz MWM diesel-generators, 750 kW (1,010 hp)
- Propulsion: 2 × propeller shafts, controllable pitch, five-bladed Sulzer-Escher propellers
- Speed: 30 knots (56 km/h)
- Range: more than 4,000 nmi (7,400 km) at 18 knots (33 km/h)
- Complement: 202 crew plus 20 aviation
- Sensors & processing systems: 1 × EADS TRS-3D air search radar (three-dimensional); 1 × WM 25 combined surface search and fire control radar I/J band; 1 × Thales Nederland STIR 180 fire-control radar I/J/K band; 1 × Kelvin Hughes Nucleus 5000 I band navigation radar; 1 × STN Atlas DSQS-23BZ hull-mounted sonar
- Electronic warfare & decoys: ESM/ECM EADS FL 1800S; 2 × SCLAR decoys; SLQ-25 Nixie torpedo decoy
- Armament: Naval guns: 1 × OTO-Melara 76 mm dual-purpose gun; 2 × Mauser MLG27 27 mm autocannons; Antiaircraft warfare: 1 × 8-cell launch system, 16 × Sea Sparrow surface to air missiles; CIWS: 2 × MK 49 launcher, 21 × RAM each; Anti-ship missiles: 2 × quadruple Harpoon anti-ship missile launchers; Antisubmarine warfare: 2 × Mark 32 324-mm twin torpedo launchers, 8 × DM4A1 or Mark 46 torpedo
- Aircraft carried: Place for 2 Sea Lynx Mk.88A helicopters equipped with torpedoes, air-to-surface missiles Sea Skua, and/or heavy machine gun.

Köln was a Bremen-class frigate of the German Navy. She was the fifth ship of the class, and the fifth ship to serve with one of the navies of Germany to be named after the city of Cologne, in North Rhine-Westphalia. Her predecessor was the frigate Köln of the Bundesmarine, lead ship of the Köln class.

== Construction and commissioning ==
Köln was laid down in June 1980 at the yards of Blohm+Voss, Hamburg and launched on 29 May 1981. After undergoing trials Köln was commissioned on 19 October 1984. During her later career she was based at Wilhelmshaven as part of 4. Fregattengeschwader, forming a component of Einsatzflottille 2.

== Service ==
After commissioning Köln participated in several international deployments. In early July 1988 Köln deployed with a NATO squadron to search for survivors from the Piper Alpha oil platform in the North Sea, which had been destroyed in a fire. From January to March 1991, Köln was the flagship of the German naval forces deployed in the Mediterranean during the Gulf War. From January to April 1994 she deployed as part of Operation Southern Cross, the maritime element of Deutscher Unterstützungsverband Somalia, the German component of United Nations Operation in Somalia II. Köln was the flagship of Task Group 500.02 during this period, operating off the Somali coast. On 7 September 2000 she joined STANAVFORMED in the Mediterranean, alongside USS Caron, HMS York, Luigi Durand de la Penne, HNLMS Van Amstel, Spetsai, TCG Trakya and Numancia. The squadron made port visits in Tunisia and several NATO member states. Plans had been made to visit Haifa, transit the Suez Canal and enter the Red Sea, but violence in the region caused these plans to be cancelled. Köln returned to Wilhelmshaven on 17 December 2000, having sailed 18,734.5 nautical miles.

Köln sailed from Wilhelmshaven on 2 January 2002 to join the force supporting Operation Enduring Freedom. She spent 6½ months on deployment, before returning to Wilhelmshaven in mid-July. She was again deployed in support of Operation Enduring Freedom, operating off the Horn of Africa and the Arabian Peninsula from April to October 2007, succeeding her sister ship Bremen as part of Combined Task Force 150. On 30 August 2010 Köln joined Operation Atalanta, the EU's anti-piracy mission off the Horn of Africa, replacing the frigate Schleswig-Holstein, and returning to Wilhelmshaven on 10 December 2010. Köln embarked on her final deployment on 29 August 2011, joining Operation Atalanta, and returning to Wilhelmshaven on 9 December 2011.

Köln was removed from active service on 1 February 2012 and in early May that year was towed to the Wilhelmshaven naval base to prepare for decommissioning. She was decommissioned on 31 July 2012. After some time spent laid up, she was put up for sale for scrapping on 24 August 2015. On 10 October 2016 Köln was towed to Kampen, Overijssel, in the Netherlands, to be scrapped.
