= Sachsen-class frigate =

German air-defense frigates

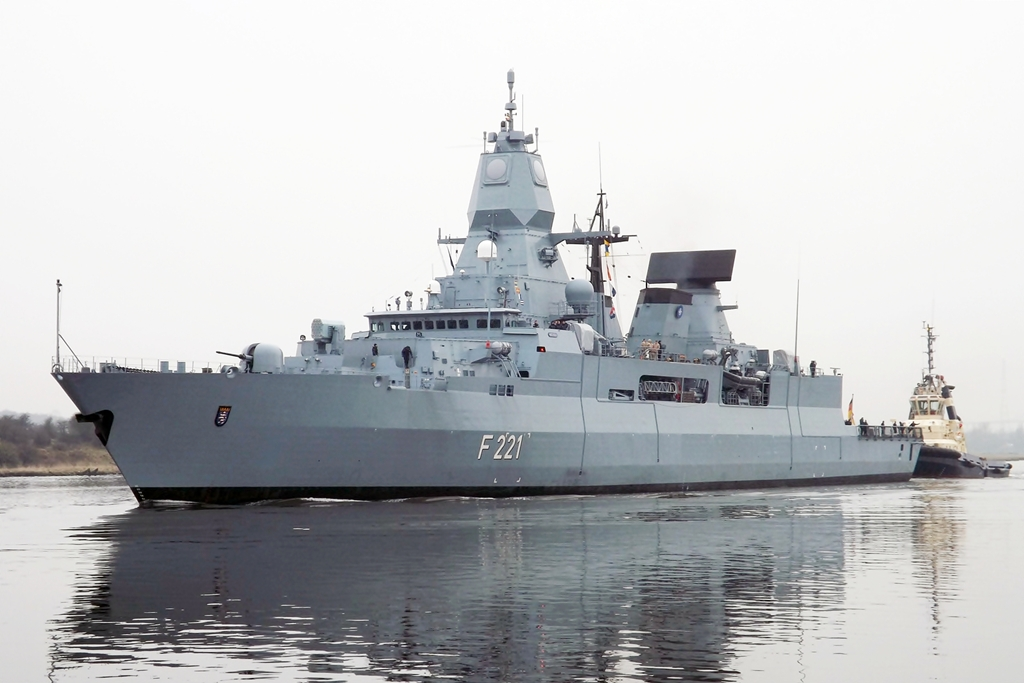
- Hessen on 11 April 2013

Class overview
- Builders: Blohm + Voss; Howaldtswerke-Deutsche Werft; Nordseewerke
- Operators: German Navy
- Preceded by: Lütjens class
- Succeeded by: F127
- Cost: ~€2 billion program cost
- Built: 1999–2006
- In commission: 2003–present
- Planned: 4
- Completed: 3
- Canceled: 1
- Active: 3

General characteristics
- Type: Frigate
- Displacement: 5,690 long tons (5,780 t) (Full load)
- Length: 143 m (469 ft 2 in)
- Beam: 17.44 m (57 ft 3 in)
- Draft: 6 m (19 ft 8 in)
- Installed power: 7.4 MW (9,900 hp) per diesel engine
- Propulsion: 2 × MTU V20 diesel engines; 1 × General Electric LM2500 gas turbine; 2 × controllable-pitch propellers
- Speed: 29 knots (54 km/h; 33 mph)
- Range: 4,000 nmi (7,400 km; 4,600 mi) at 18 kn (33 km/h; 21 mph)
- Complement: 230 crew; 13 aircrew
- Sensors & processing systems: 1 × Thales Nederland SMART-L air and surface surveillance radar; 1 × Thales Nederland APAR air and surface search, tracking, and guidance radar; 1 × Hensoldt TRS-4D mult-function AESA radar (modernization); 2 × STN Atlas 9600-M multi-function ARPA radars; 1 × STN Atlas MSP 500 electro-optical fire control system; 1 × STN Atlas DSQS-24B bow sonar
- Electronic warfare & decoys: 1 FL 1800 S II ECM suite; 6 Sippican Hycor SRBOC launcher
- Armament: 1 × OTO-Melara 76 mm dual-purpose gun; 2 × Mauser MLG 27 27 mm autocannons; 32 × Mk 41 cells for SM-2 and RIM-162 ESSM surface-to-air missiles; 2 × RAM launchers; 2 × quadruple Harpoon anti-ship missile launchers; 2 × triple torpedo launchers with MU90 Impact torpedoes
- Aircraft carried: 2 × Sea Lynx Mk.88A or 2 NH90 helicopters

The F124 Sachsen class is a German Navy's class of air-defense frigates. The design of the hull is based on that of the F123 Brandenburg class but with enhanced stealth features designed to deceive an opponent's radar and acoustic sensors. The class incorporates an advanced multifunction radar APAR and a SMART-L long-range radar which is purported to be capable of detecting stealth aircraft and stealth missiles.

Although designated as frigates, they are comparable to destroyers in capability. The Sachsen class frigates replaced the Lütjens class destroyers. They are similar to the Dutch De Zeven Provinciën class, in that both are based on the use of a common primary anti-air warfare system built around the APAR and SMART-L radars as well as the area-defence SM-2 Block IIIA and point-defence Evolved Sea Sparrow Missile (ESSM) surface-to-air missiles.

The German government contracted for three ships in June 1996 with an option on a fourth that was provisionally to have been named Thüringen, but the option for this fourth ship was not taken up. At €2 billion for the three ships, the class was one of the most expensive ship building programs of the German Navy.

== Design ==
Following the reunification of Germany in 1990 at the end of the Cold War, the German Navy continued the construction program of the former Bundesmarine (Federal Navy), which projected a fleet centered on destroyers and frigates. The Sachsen class was the second group of frigates to be built in the post-unification era, following the Brandenburg-class frigates laid down in the early 1990s. The three Sachsens were ordered to replace the old Lütjens-class destroyers that were then over thirty years old.

=== General characteristics and machinery ===
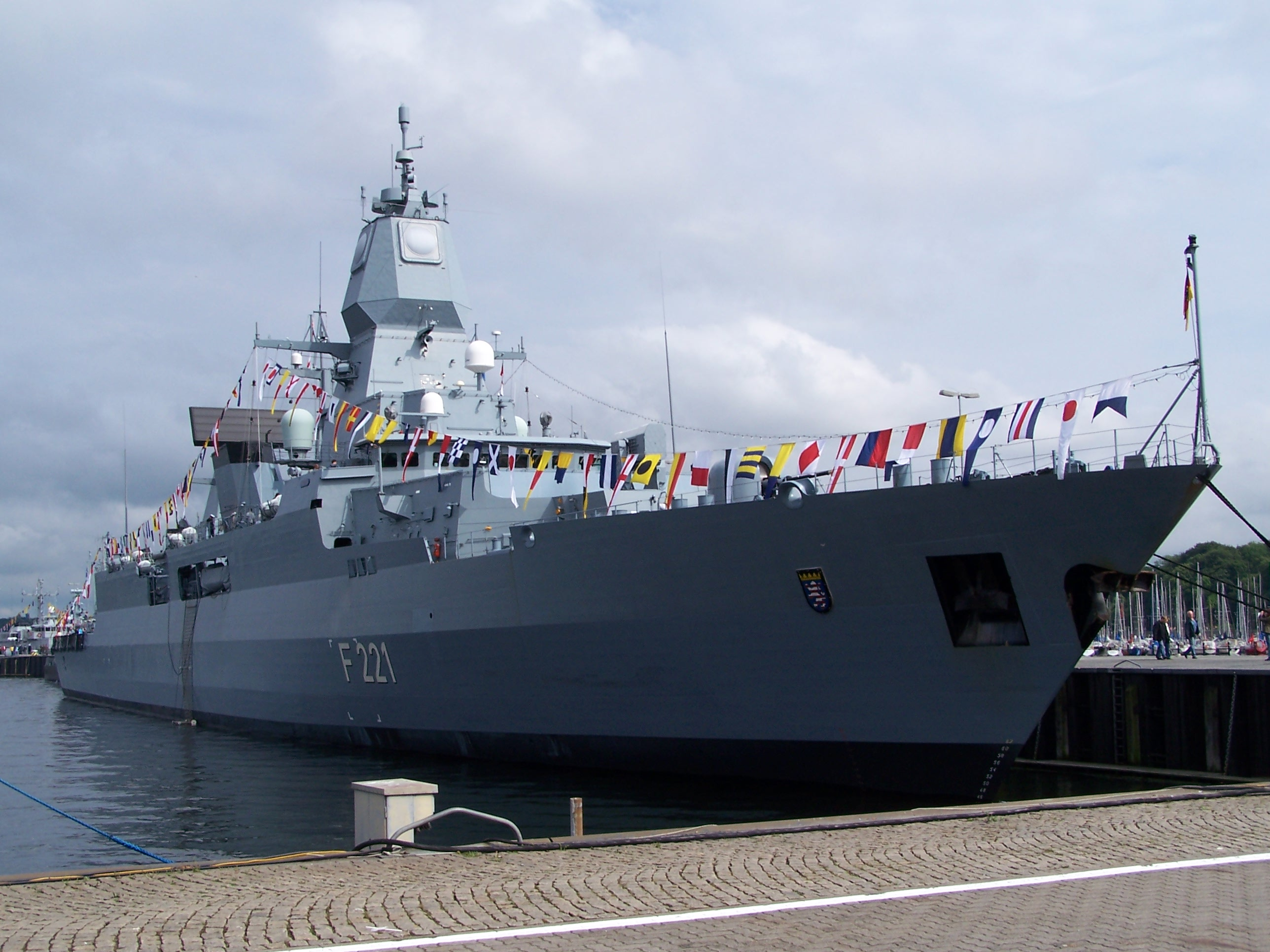
Hessen at Kiel Week in 2007

The ships of the Sachsen class are 132.15 meters (433 ft 7 in) long at the waterline and 143 m (469 ft 2 in) long overall. They have a beam of 17.44 m (57 ft 3 in) and a draft of 5 m (16 ft 5 in), though the draft increases to 7 m (23 ft 0 in) at the sonar array in the bulbous bow. They displace 5,690 long tons (5,780 t) at full load. Steering is controlled by a single roll-stabilized rudder; the ships have a turning radius of 570 m (1,870 ft). The frigates have a crew of 38 officers, 64 petty officers, and 140 enlisted sailors. They have accommodations for an additional thirteen officers and sailors as part of a squadron commander's staff, and they have crew provisions for female sailors. The ships can remain at sea for 21 days at a time.

The ships' hulls were designed on the pattern of the previous Brandenburg class to allow for great commonality of parts to reduce maintenance costs; they were built using MEKO modular construction and incorporate seven watertight compartments. The primary improvement over the earlier vessels is the significantly reduced radar signature. The ships were designed with a capacity for an extra 270 long tons (270 t) of weight, to allow for future additions of new weapons and sensors without compromising the ships' efficiency.

The ships of the Sachsen class are equipped with a combined diesel and gas (CODAG) propulsion system. The two operating shafts work independently. The diesel engines are installed in a non-walkable sound-proof capsule. The shafts drive two five-bladed variable-pitch propellers. The General Electric LM2500 PF/MLG gas turbine is rated at 31,500 shaft horsepower (23,500 kW) and the MTU 20V 1163 TB93 diesels provide a combined 20,100 brake horsepower (15,000 kW). The total 51,600 hp (38,500 kW) propulsion system provides a top speed of 29 knots (54 km/h; 33 mph); while operating the diesels only, the ships can cruise for 4,000 nautical miles (7,400 km; 4,600 mi) at a speed of 18 kn (33 km/h; 21 mph). The ships are equipped with four 1,000 kilowatt diesel generators that operate at 400 Volts (V) and 115 V.

Steering is controlled via the Rudder Roll System, which communicates information about the ship's position and rudder dampening signals, allowing the ships to maintain "almost unprecedented stability" in as high as sea state 5.

=== Armament ===
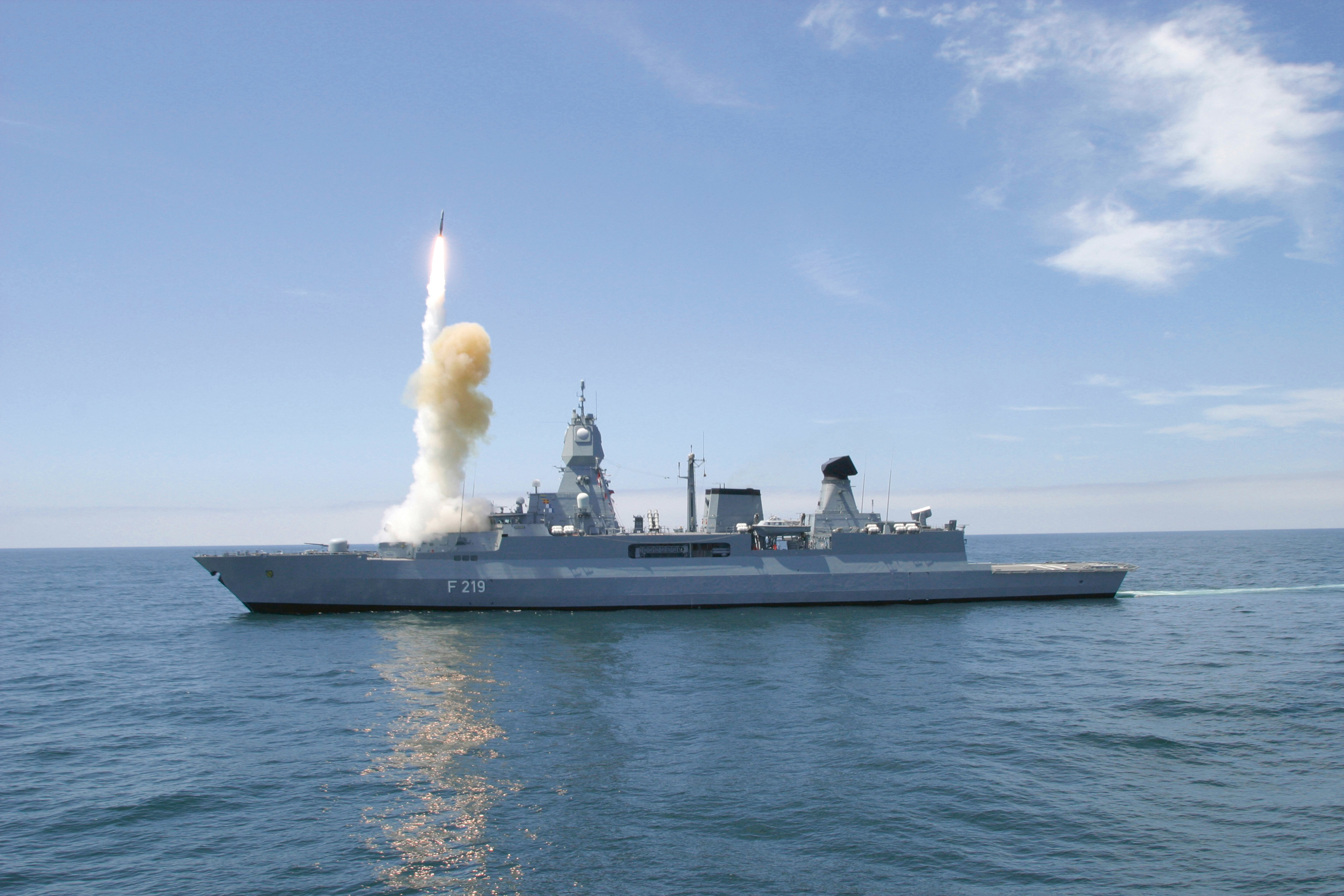
Sachsen launching an SM-2 missile

These ships were optimized for the anti-air warfare role. The primary anti-air weapons are the 32-cell Mk 41 Mod 10 vertical launching system, equipped with twenty-four SM-2 Block IIIA missiles and thirty-two Evolved Sea Sparrow missiles. Point-defense against cruise missiles is provided by a pair of 21-round Rolling Airframe Missile launchers. The ships are also equipped with two four-cell RGM-84 Harpoon anti-ship missile launchers. In 2013, the German Navy considered modifying the ships' long-range search radar to allow the SM-2 missiles to be used in an anti-ballistic missile capacity.

For defense against submarines, the frigates carry two triple-launchers for the 324 mm (12.8 in) MU90 Impact torpedoes. The ships also carry a variety of guns, including one dual-purpose 62-caliber 76-millimeter (3 in) gun manufactured by OTO Melara. They are also armed with two Rheinmetall 27 mm (1.1 in) MLG 27 remote-controlled autocannons in single mounts.

In January 2003, Hamburg had a modified Panzerhaubitze 2000 turret with a 155 mm (6.1 in) gun fitted experimentally for the Modular Naval Artillery Concept. The experiment was a feasibility study for the projected F125-class frigate. The gun had a range of 40 nmi (74 km; 46 mi) and a rate of fire of 10 rounds per minute.

Sachsen and her sister ships are equipped with a flight deck and hangar that can accommodate two Super Lynx or NH90 helicopters. The flight deck is rated to accommodate a 15-metric-ton (15-long-ton; 17-short-ton) helicopter in conditions up to sea state 6. The helicopter handling system from MBB-Förder und Hebesysteme uses laser guided and computer controlled manipulator arms to secure the helicopter after landing.

=== Sensors and countermeasures ===
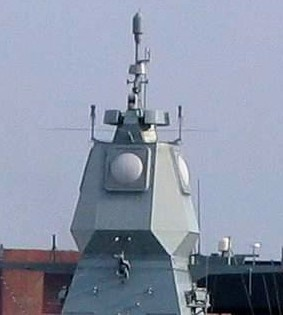
The APAR radar

For this role the ships are equipped with an advanced sensor and weapons suite. The primary sensors for this role are the long range surveillance radar SMART-L and the multi-function radar APAR. The SMART-L and APAR sets are highly complementary, in the sense that SMART-L is an L band radar providing very long range surveillance while APAR is an X band radar providing precise target tracking, a highly capable horizon search capability, and missile guidance using the Interrupted Continuous Wave Illumination (ICWI) technique, thus allowing guidance of 32 semi-active radar homing missiles in flight simultaneously, including 16 in the terminal guidance phase. The ships are also equipped with two STN Atlas 9600-M ARPA navigation radars.

=== Modernisation efforts ===
In 2013, Atlas Elektronik and Thales Deutschland were awarded a contract to modernize the frigates command system, with the project to be completed by 2017.

In August 2021, the German armed forces' procurement agency (BAAINBw) awarded a contract to German and Israeli companies Hensoldt and IAI, under which the Sachsen-class frigates will have their obsolete SMART-L long-range radar replaced by a new AESA radar system designated as TRS-4D/LR ROT. It will be capable of tracking "very small and maneuverable" targets at distances of more than 400 km for air targets and up to 2,000 km for targets in earth orbit. This includes long-range ballistic missiles, allowing Germany to participate in NATOs BMD (ballistic missile defence) efforts. It is not planned to fit an anti-ballistic missile such as the SM-3 to the ships. The ships IFF systems will also be modernised.

Before installation of the three shipborne radars commences, an additional first unit will in 2023 be installed at a coastal facility near the Naval School of Technology at Parow in the state of Mecklenburg-Western Pomerania for purposes of training and evaluation. The first ship is planned to have its radar installed in 2024 and all three ships are to have been fitted with the new system by 2028.

The same Hensoldt/IAI system has also been selected by the German Air Force in order to replace its stationary HR-3000 - or HADR (Hughes Air Defense Radar) - early warning radars.

In 2025, Sachsen was fitted with an experimental laser weapon manufactured by Rheinmetall and MBDA for testing.

== Ships ==
Pennant number	Name	Call sign	Builder	Laid down	Launched	Delivered	Commissioned	Fate
F219	Sachsen	DRAA	Blohm + Voss, Hamburg	1 February 1999	20 January 2001	29 November 2002	4 November 2004	In service
F220	Hamburg	DRAB	HDW, Kiel	1 September 2000	16 August 2002	September 2004	13 December 2004	In service
F221	Hessen	DRAC	Nordseewerke, Emden	14 September 2001	26 July 2003	7 December 2005	21 April 2006	In service
F222	Thüringen	Cancelled						

== Service history ==
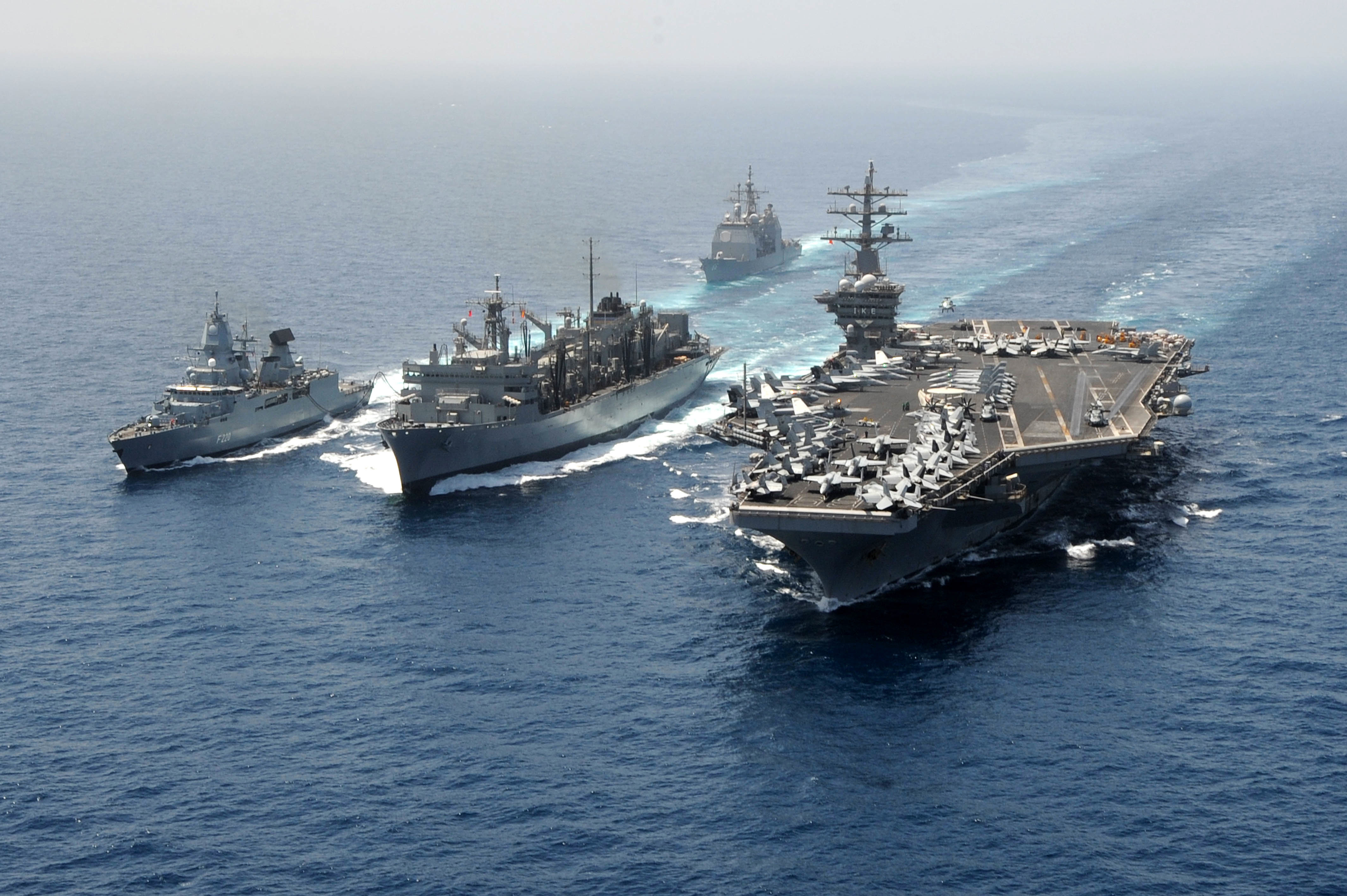
Hamburg refueling from USNS Bridge with USS Dwight D. Eisenhower on the right and USS Hué City in the background

In August 2004, Sachsen completed a series of live missile firings at the Point Mugu missile launch range off the coast of California that included a total of 11 ESSM and 10 SM-2 Block IIIA missiles. The tests included firings against target drones such as the BQM-74E Chukar III and BQM-34S Firebee I, as well as against missile targets such as the AQM-37C Jayhawk and air-launched Kormoran 1 anti-ship missiles. While serving in NATO Standing Maritime Force 1 in 2004, Sachsen took part in training operations with the United States' aircraft carrier USS Enterprise. Since 2006, the three Sachsen-class ships have been assigned to Einsatzflottille 2 and based in Wilhelmshaven, along with the four Brandenburg-class frigates. The seven frigates together form the 2nd Fregattengeschwader (Frigate Squadron).

Operations with American carrier groups continued through the 2000s and 2010s, including inter-operability exercises with Hessen and the carrier USS Harry S. Truman in 2010. Hessen thereafter departed for a cruise in the Mediterranean Sea. In addition, Hamburg became the first German ship to fully integrate into an American carrier strike group in March 2013.

Hessen served as the flagship of the NATO Standing Maritime Force 1 in January 2013. In March 2015, Hessen and the frigates Karlsruhe and Brandenburg took part in Operation Good Hope, a training exercise conducted with the South African Navy.

In January 2024, Hessen departed from Wilhelmshaven port and headed towards the Gulf of Aden, where she currently partakes in EUNAVFOR Aspides, the EU mission to protect commercial traffic against Iran-backed Houthi attacks, which have used Anti-Ship missiles and combat drones to attack freight ships there in an attempt to force Israel to stop their Gaza operation. Germany's Defense Minister Boris Pistorius called it "the Navy's most dangerous mission in decades".

On 28 January 2024, Hessen attempted to intercept a drone which was flying towards it. Two guided missiles were fired, both failed to hit their target and fell into the sea. Spiegel sources blamed technical defects. Shortly after, it was revealed that it wasn't a Houthi drone but a friendly American MQ-9 Reaper drone which was misidentified and fired upon for reasons yet unknown. On 29 January, Hessen successfully intercepted two Houthi drones using her 76mm cannon and the RIM-116 missiles.

=== Exports ===
==== Israel ====
Rumors emerged in July 2013 that the Israeli Navy had agreed to procure two destroyers from Germany for €1 billion. These had been rumored to be Sachsen-class vessels. Eventually, Israel purchased four Sa'ar 6-class corvettes—significantly smaller vessels—from German shipyards in 2015.

==== Australia ====
Australia selected an AEGIS combat system-equipped variant of the Sachsen-class for consideration as part of Project SEA 4000 in 2002. It ultimately lost out to a version of Navantia's Álvaro de Bazán-class frigate.

== See also ==
- List of frigate classes in service

Equivalent frigates of the same era

- De Zeven Provinciën class
- Project 22350
- Shivalik class
- FREMM
- Iver Huitfeldt class
- Type 054A
- Álvaro de Bazán class
