= German frigate Hamburg =

Sachsen-class frigate of the German Navy

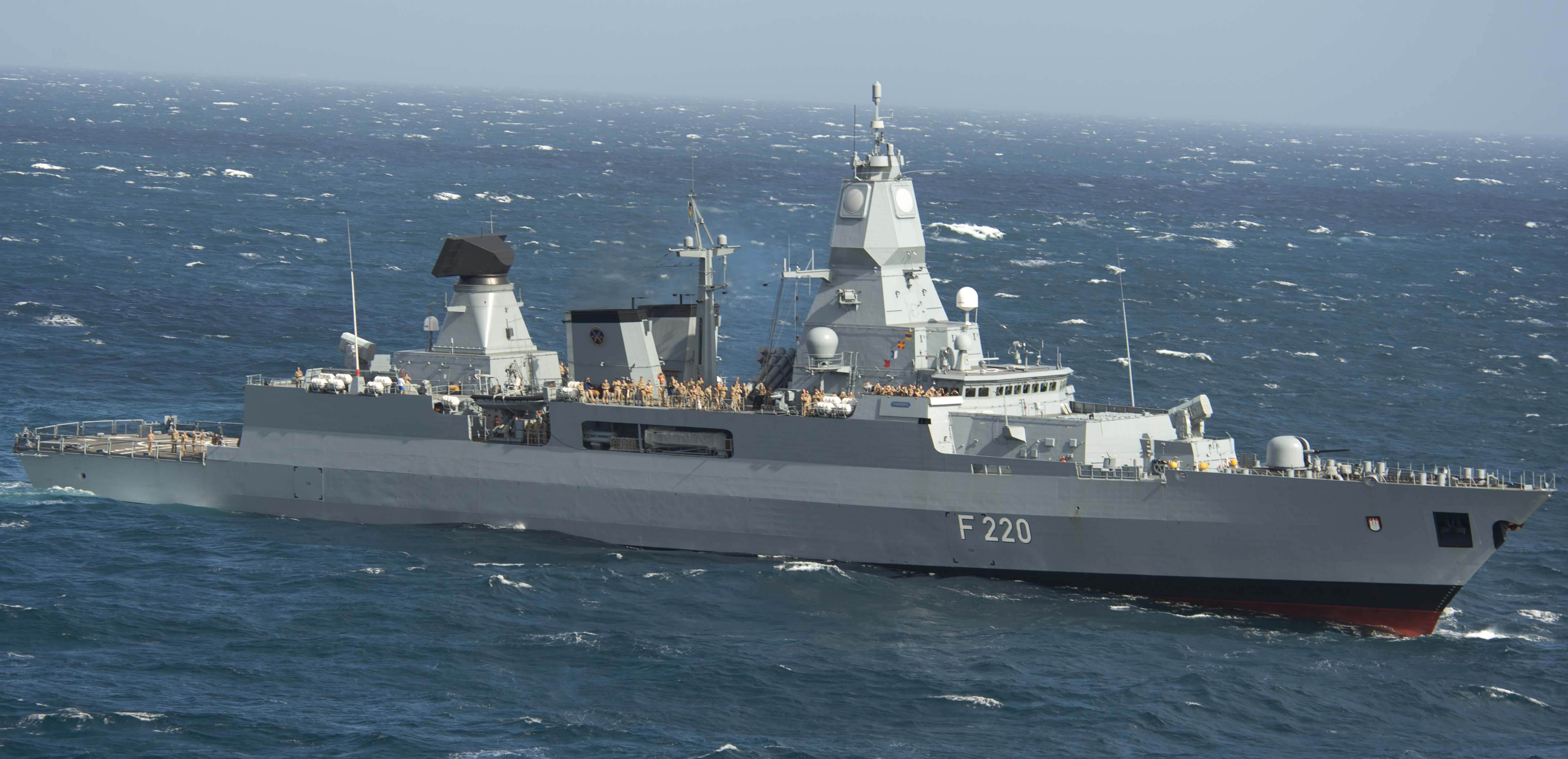
- Hamburg escorting USS Dwight D. Eisenhower in 2013

History

Germany
- Name: Hamburg
- Builder: Howaldtswerke-Deutsche Werft, Kiel
- Laid down: 1 September 2000
- Launched: 16 August 2002
- Commissioned: 13 December 2004
- Identification: Pennant number: F220; MMSI number: 211905000; Call sign: DRAB
- Status: Active

General characteristics
- Class & type: Sachsen-class frigate
- Displacement: 5,800 tonnes
- Length: 143 m (469 ft)
- Beam: 17.44 m (57.2 ft)
- Draught: 6 m (20 ft)
- Propulsion: CODAG (combined diesel and gas); 2 propeller shafts, controllable-pitch propellers; 2 MTU V20 diesel engines, 7.4 MW each; 1 General Electric LM2500 gas turbine
- Speed: 29 knots (54 km/h; 33 mph)
- Range: 4,000 nmi (7,400 km; 4,600 mi)+ at 18 kn (33 km/h; 21 mph)
- Complement: 230 crew + 13 aircrew
- Sensors & processing systems: 1 Thales Nederland SMART-L long-range air and surface surveillance radar (D band); 1 Thales Nederland APAR air and surface search, tracking and guidance radar (I band); 1 Thales Nederland Sirius IRST long-range infrared surveillance and tracking system (fitted for but not with); 2 STN Atlas 9600-M multi-function I/J band ARPA radars; 1 STN Atlas MSP 500 electro-optical fire control system; 1 STN Atlas DSQS-24B bow sonar
- Electronic warfare & decoys: 1 FL 1800 S II ECM suite; 6 Sippican Hycor SRBOC launcher
- Armament: 1 OTO-Melara 76 mm dual-purpose gun; 2 Mauser MLG 27 27 mm autocannons; 1 MK. 41 VLS Tactical with 32 cells for 24 SM-2 Block IIIA and 32 RIM-162 ESSM (quad-packs per cell) surface-to-air missiles; 2 RAM launchers with 21 surface-to-air/CIWS-missiles each; 2 quadruple Harpoon anti-ship missile launchers; 2 triple torpedo launchers with EuroTorp MU90 Impact torpedoes
- Aircraft carried: 2 Sea Lynx Mk.88A or 2 NH90 helicopters equipped with torpedoes, air-to-surface missiles Sea Skua, and/or heavy machine gun.

Hamburg is a Sachsen-class frigate of the German Navy.

== Construction and commissioning ==
Built by Howaldtswerke-Deutsche Werft, Kiel, Hamburg was the second of the Sachsen class to be launched and then commissioned into the German Navy. She is based at Wilhelmshaven, initially as part of 1. Fregattengeschwader with the other ships of the Sachsen class, and from 9 January 2005 as part of the 2. Fregattengeschwader, which itself became part of the new Einsatzflottille 2 on 27 June 2005.

== Service ==
Hamburg joined Operation Atalanta, the EU-led anti-piracy mission, in November 2010. She was on deployment with EUNAVFOR until March 2011. Between 24 March and 3 June 2013 Hamburg deployed with the USS Dwight D. Eisenhower carrier combat group, and was tasked with co-ordinating all flight movements within a radius of 180 km, including all take-offs and landings on the carrier. Hamburg was the first German ship to fully integrate into an American Strike group, and it was the first time in the history of the US Navy that a German frigate was entrusted with the sole protection of an American aircraft carrier.

On 11 February 2014 Hamburg deployed from Wilhelmshaven with the frigates Mecklenburg-Vorpommern and Augsburg, the corvette Oldenburg and the storeship Frankfurt am Main to take part in the navy's annual training and exercises. These concluded at Kiel on 20 June 2014, during which time the ships carried out manoeuvrers as far north as the Arctic Circle and as far south as the Equator, visiting 13 ports in nine countries. During this time she participated in the celebrations marking the 825th birthday of Hamburg Harbour from 9 to 11 May 2014, when she led a parade of ships into the harbour. From 20 August to 4 September 2014, Hamburg escorted the MV Cape Ray, carrying Syrian chemical weapons to be disposed of. Hamburg escorted Cape Ray through the Northeast Atlantic, across the North and Baltic Seas, to Finland and Germany.

Hamburg later became the flagship of Standing NATO Maritime Group 2, and on 8 June 2015 sailed from Wilhelmshaven for a Mediterranean deployment. She took part in the NATO exercise "Trident Juncture" and in Operation Active Endeavour, returning to Wilhelmshaven on 20 December 2015.

On 4 August 2020 Hamburg sailed for 5-month deployment with Operation Irini, the EU operation enforcing the United Nations arms embargo on Libya. The ship is expected to remain almost entirely at sea during the operation, so her personnel are not exposed to the coronavirus.
