= German frigate Sachsen =

German Navy vessel

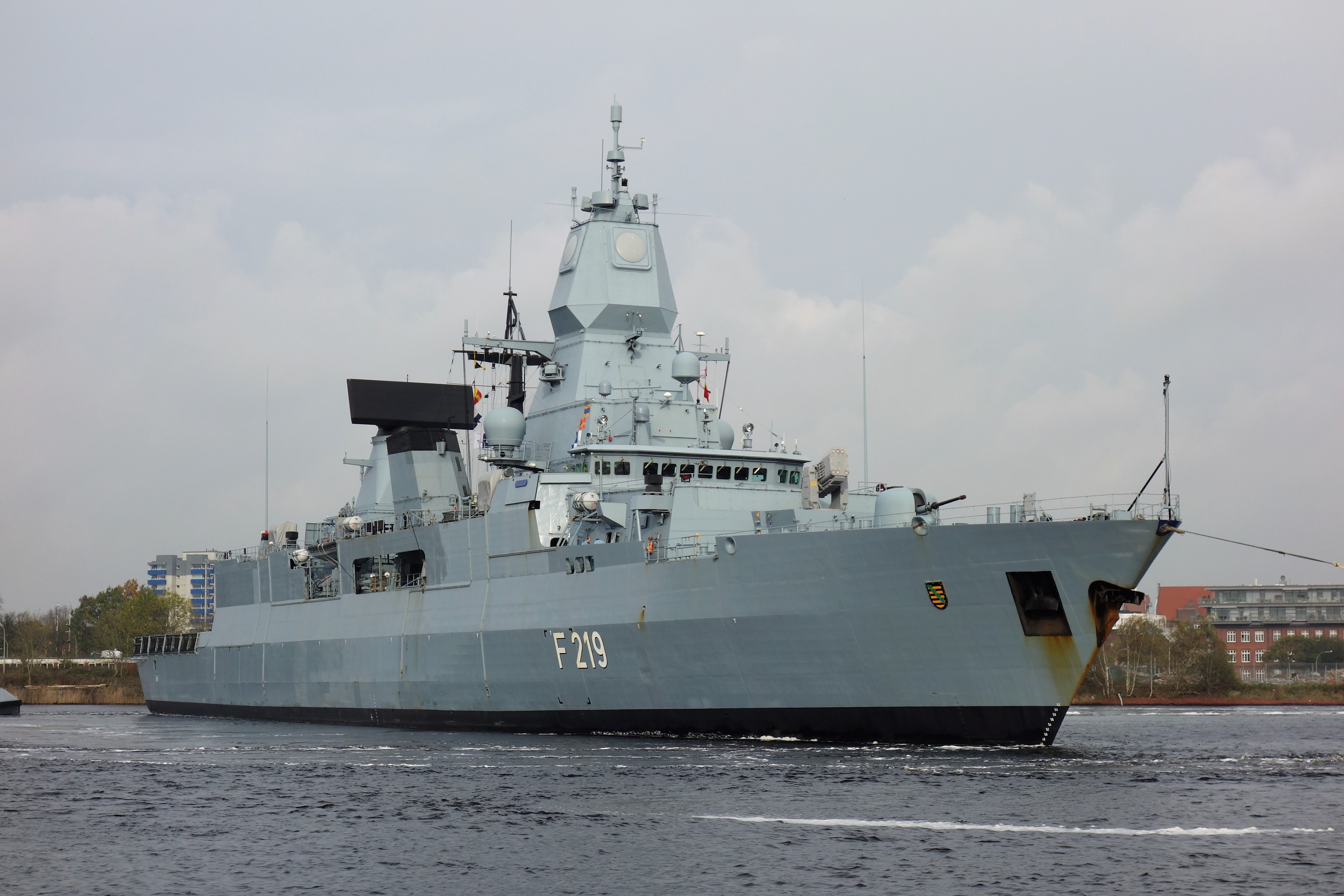
- Sachsen at Wilhelmshaven in 2017

History

Germany
- Name: Sachsen
- Builder: Blohm+Voss, Hamburg
- Laid down: 1 February 1999
- Launched: 20 January 2001
- Commissioned: 4 November 2004
- Identification: Pennant number: F219; MMSI number: 211210150; Call sign: DRAA
- Status: Active

General characteristics
- Class & type: Sachsen-class frigate
- Displacement: 5,800 tonnes
- Length: 143 m (469 ft)
- Beam: 17.44 m (57.2 ft)
- Draught: 6 m (20 ft)
- Propulsion: CODAG (combined diesel and gas); 2 propeller shafts, controllable-pitch propellers; 2 MTU V20 diesel engines, 7.4 MW each; 1 General Electric LM2500 gas turbine
- Speed: 29 knots (54 km/h; 33 mph)
- Range: 4,000 nmi (7,400 km; 4,600 mi)+ at 18 kn (33 km/h; 21 mph)
- Complement: 230 crew + 13 aircrew
- Sensors & processing systems: 1 Thales Nederland SMART-L long-range air and surface surveillance radar (D band); 1 Thales Nederland APAR air and surface search, tracking and guidance radar (I band); 1 Thales Nederland Sirius IRST long-range infrared surveillance and tracking system (fitted for but not with); 2 STN Atlas 9600-M multi-function I/J band ARPA radars; 1 STN Atlas MSP 500 electro-optical fire control system; 1 STN Atlas DSQS-24B bow sonar
- Electronic warfare & decoys: 1 FL 1800 S II ECM suite; 6 Sippican Hycor SRBOC launcher
- Armament: 1 × 76/62 Compact dual-purpose gun; 2 × Mauser MLG 27 27 mm autocannons; 1 MK. 41 VLS Tactical with 32 cells for 24 SM-2 Block IIIA and 32 RIM-162 ESSM (quad-packs per cell) surface-to-air missiles; 4 × SMG Heavy Machine Gun 12.7 mm; 2 × RAM launchers with 21 surface-to-air/CIWS-missiles each; 2 × quadruple Harpoon anti-ship missile launchers; 2 × triple torpedo launchers with EuroTorp MU90 Impact torpedoes; 4 × decoy thrower MASS
- Aircraft carried: 2 Sea Lynx Mk.88A or 2 NH90 helicopters equipped with torpedoes, air-to-surface missiles Sea Skua, and/or heavy machine gun.

Sachsen is a Sachsen-class frigate of the German Navy, the lead ship of her class.

== Construction and commissioning ==
Built by Blohm+Voss, Hamburg, Sachsen was the first of the Sachsen class to be launched and then commissioned into the German Navy. She is based at Wilhelmshaven, initially as part of 1. Fregattengeschwader with the other ships of the Sachsen class, and from 9 January 2005 as part of the 2. Fregattengeschwader, which itself became part of the new Einsatzflottille 2 on 27 June 2005.

== Service ==
In August 2004, Sachsen completed a series of live missile firings at the Point Mugu missile launch range off the coast of California that included a total of 11 ESSM and 10 SM-2 Block IIIA missiles. The tests included firings against target drones such as the BQM-74E Chukar III and BQM-34S Firebee I, as well as against missile targets such as the AQM-37C Jayhawk and air-launched Kormoran 1 anti-ship missiles. While serving in Standing NATO Maritime Group 1 in 2004, Sachsen took part in training operations with the United States' aircraft carrier USS Enterprise. She was part of Standing NATO Maritime Group 1 in 2007, and in 2009 participated in the UNITAS Gold exercises, during which she took part in the sinking of a target ship, the former destroyer USS Conolly. In July 2012 she deployed as part of Operation Atalanta, combatting piracy off the coast of Somalia. From 26 August 2013 to 14 December 2013 Sachsen was part of Standing NATO Maritime Group 2.

Sachsen deployed from Wilhelmshaven on 9 October 2015 to participate in the NATO exercise "Trident Juncture". Sachsen replaced the Dutch frigate HNLMS De Ruyter in Standing Nato Maritime Group 2 on 12 December 2016, serving as the flagship of Admiral Axel Deertz during this time. The frigate Brandenburg replaced her as flagship of the taskforce in early April 2017. On 5 January 2018 Sachsen was assigned to EU Navfor Med, replacing the frigate Mecklenburg-Vorpommern.

On 21 June 2018, Sachsen was operating with Lübeck near the Arctic Circle when it attempted to fire a SM-2 Block IIIA missile, and it exploded above the ship. The explosion scorched the paint off the bridge and the vertical launch cells battery. Two German sailors suffered minor injuries. After a brief port call in Harstad, Norway, both frigates returned to their homeport of Wilhelmshaven, Germany.

In June 2022, Sachsen was fitted with an experimental laser weapon manufactured by Rheinmetall and MDBA to test the effectiveness of the weapon. In the first year of evaluation, which was managed by the Federal Office of Bundeswehr Equipment, Information Technology and In-Service Support, the weapon was fired more than 100 times. Testing lasted for more than a year, and included tests during cruises in the Baltic and Mediterranean Seas. The ship fired the laser around a thousand times at air, sea, and land targets. The weapon was later moved ashore to the Bundeswehr Technical Centre for Weapons and Ammunition in Meppen, where further tests were carried out, including a demonstration in March 2026 for senior government officials. In July 2026, the government signed contracts with the two firms to acquire an improved version of the weapon, which is to enter service by 2029.

In 2026, the frigate sailed as the lead ship of Standing NATO Maritime Group 1, commanded by an embarked British Commodore.
