= German frigate Hessen =

Sachsen-class frigate of the German Navy

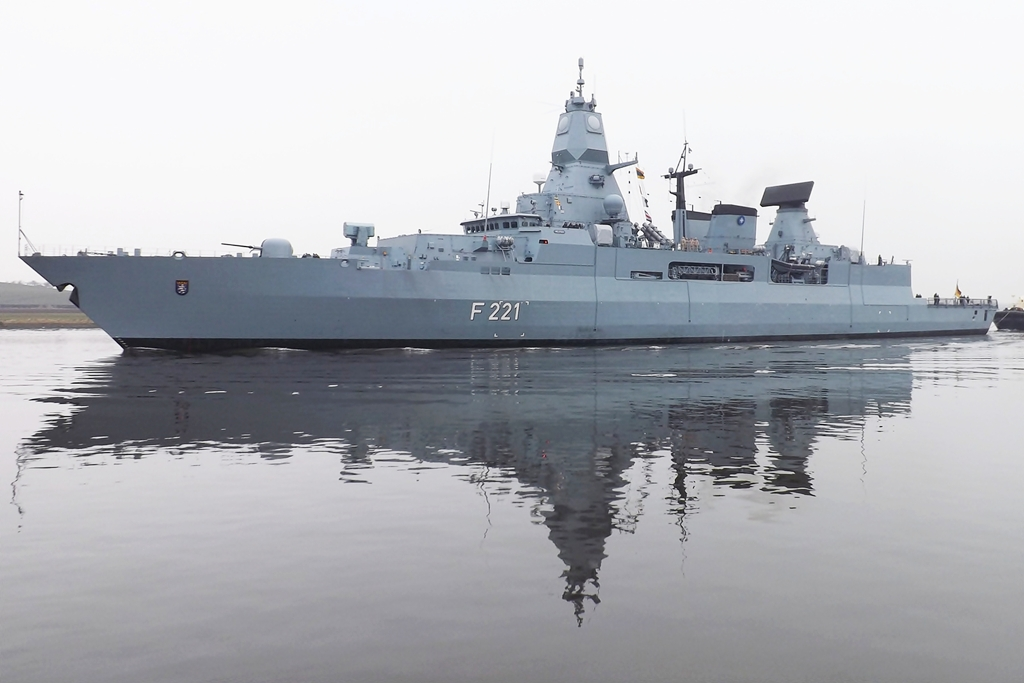
- Hessen in 2013

History

Germany
- Name: Hessen
- Builder: Nordseewerke, Emden
- Laid down: 14 September 2001
- Launched: 26 July 2003
- Commissioned: 21 April 2006
- Identification: Pennant number: F221; MMSI number: 211906000; Call sign: DRAC
- Status: Active

General characteristics
- Class & type: Sachsen-class frigate
- Displacement: 5,800 tonnes
- Length: 143 m (469 ft 2 in)
- Beam: 17.44 m (57 ft 3 in)
- Draught: 6 m (19 ft 8 in)
- Propulsion: CODAG (combined diesel and gas); 2 propeller shafts, controllable-pitch propellers; 2 MTU V20 diesel engines, 7.4 MW each; 1 General Electric LM2500 gas turbine
- Speed: 29 knots (54 km/h; 33 mph)
- Range: 4,000 nmi (7,400 km; 4,600 mi)+ at 18 kn (33 km/h; 21 mph)
- Complement: 230 crew + 13 aircrew
- Sensors & processing systems: 1 Thales Nederland SMART-L long-range air and surface surveillance radar (D band); 1 Thales Nederland APAR air and surface search, tracking and guidance radar (I band); 1 Thales Nederland Sirius IRST long-range infrared surveillance and tracking system (fitted for but not with); 2 STN Atlas 9600-M multi-function I/J band ARPA radars; 1 STN Atlas MSP 500 electro-optical fire control system; 1 STN Atlas DSQS-24B bow sonar
- Electronic warfare & decoys: 1 FL 1800 S II ECM suite; 6 Sippican Hycor SRBOC launcher
- Armament: 1 OTO-Melara 76 mm dual-purpose gun; 2 Mauser MLG 27 27 mm autocannons; 1 MK. 41 VLS Tactical with 32 cells for 24 SM-2 Block IIIA and 32 RIM-162 ESSM (quad-packs per cell) surface-to-air missiles; 2 RAM launchers with 21 surface-to-air/CIWS-missiles each; 2 quadruple Harpoon anti-ship missile launchers; 2 triple torpedo launchers with EuroTorp MU90 Impact torpedoes
- Aircraft carried: 2 Sea Lynx Mk.88A or 2 NH90 helicopters equipped with torpedoes, air-to-surface missiles Sea Skua, and/or heavy machine gun.

Hessen is a Sachsen-class frigate of the German Navy.

== Construction and commissioning ==
Built by Nordseewerke, Emden, Hessen was the third and final ship of the Sachsen class to be launched and then commissioned into the German Navy. She is based at Wilhelmshaven with the other ships of the Sachsen class as part of 2. Fregattengeschwader, which itself forms part of the Einsatzflottille 2.

== Service ==
Shortly after her commissioning in 2006, Hessen was deployed with other ships of the German Navy to guard the Mecklenburg coastline during the 33rd G8 summit in 2007, which was being held in the region. In 2008 she was part of the Maritime Task Force deployed in support of the United Nations Interim Force in Lebanon. In late 2009 Hessen was involved in a Composite Training Unit Exercise off the east coast of the US, in company with the USS Dwight D. Eisenhower. In March the following year she was part of the USS Harry S. Truman combat group. In June the Hessen transited the Suez Canal with the US force and deployed with the US Fifth Fleet.

From January to June 2013 Hessen was part of Standing NATO Maritime Group 1, as the flagship of Flotilla Admiral Georg von Maltzan. She also participated in Operation Active Endeavour during this period. From December 2013 to April 2014, Hessen was deployed with EUNAVFOR in Operation Atalanta, tackling piracy off the coast of Somalia. From May to June 2015, Hessen deployed in the Mediterranean alongside the replenishment ship Berlin. Together the two vessels saved several hundred migrants from shipwrecks and other incidents.

In 2017 Hessen was responsible for securing the airspace at the G20 summit in Hamburg. On 28 January 2018 Hessen arrived at Naval Station Norfolk. She and the Norwegian frigate HNoMS Roald Amundsen took part in Composite Training Unit Exercises with the aircraft carrier USS Harry S. Truman, after which Hessen accompanied the combat group on the first half of its deployment to the Mediterranean. In October 2022, Hessen was assigned to the Carrier Strike Group of the aircraft carrier USS Gerald R. Ford for the carrier's maiden deployment. In 2023, "Hessen" took part in the UK NATO exercise "Joint Warrior 23-2", which started from King George V dock, Glasgow.

In February 2024, the frigate departed from the port of Wilhelmshaven for the Red Sea with about 240 people on board in order to assist the EU mission Aspides, which aims to protect shipping from Houthi attacks. During the mission it succeeded in shooting down two unmanned aerial vehicles, one with her 76mm cannon and another with her CIWS system. while also failing to shoot down an American MQ-9 Reaper drone in a friendly fire incident, expending two SM-2 missiles in the process. The frigate's Sea Lynx helicopter sank a surface drone on 21 March 2024, presumably with its 12.7 mm heavy machine gun. Hessen's weapons destroyed "an incoming missile" while escorting a merchant vessel on 6 April.

=== Sabotage 2025 ===
An act of sabotage was discovered on the frigate in its home port at the naval arsenal in Wilhelmshaven in February 2025. Several dozen liters of used oil were to be poured into the drinking water system during a scheduled maintenance flush.

However, the attempt was discovered in time to prevent contamination of the ship. Such contamination would have necessitated a costly and extensive cleaning of the entire system, which is essential for the survival of the crew on board.

This incident is part of a hybrid attack on the German Navy involving several acts of sabotage in January and February 2025, including against the corvette Emden and the Frankenthal-class minehunter Weilheim. According to the Inspector of the Navy, in addition to sabotage attempts from land and sea, there were cases of intrusions into naval bases and "attempts to make contact" with soldiers in uniform on their way home.

Observers see these cases as Russian intelligence services using "disposable agents".
