= German frigate Augsburg (F213) =

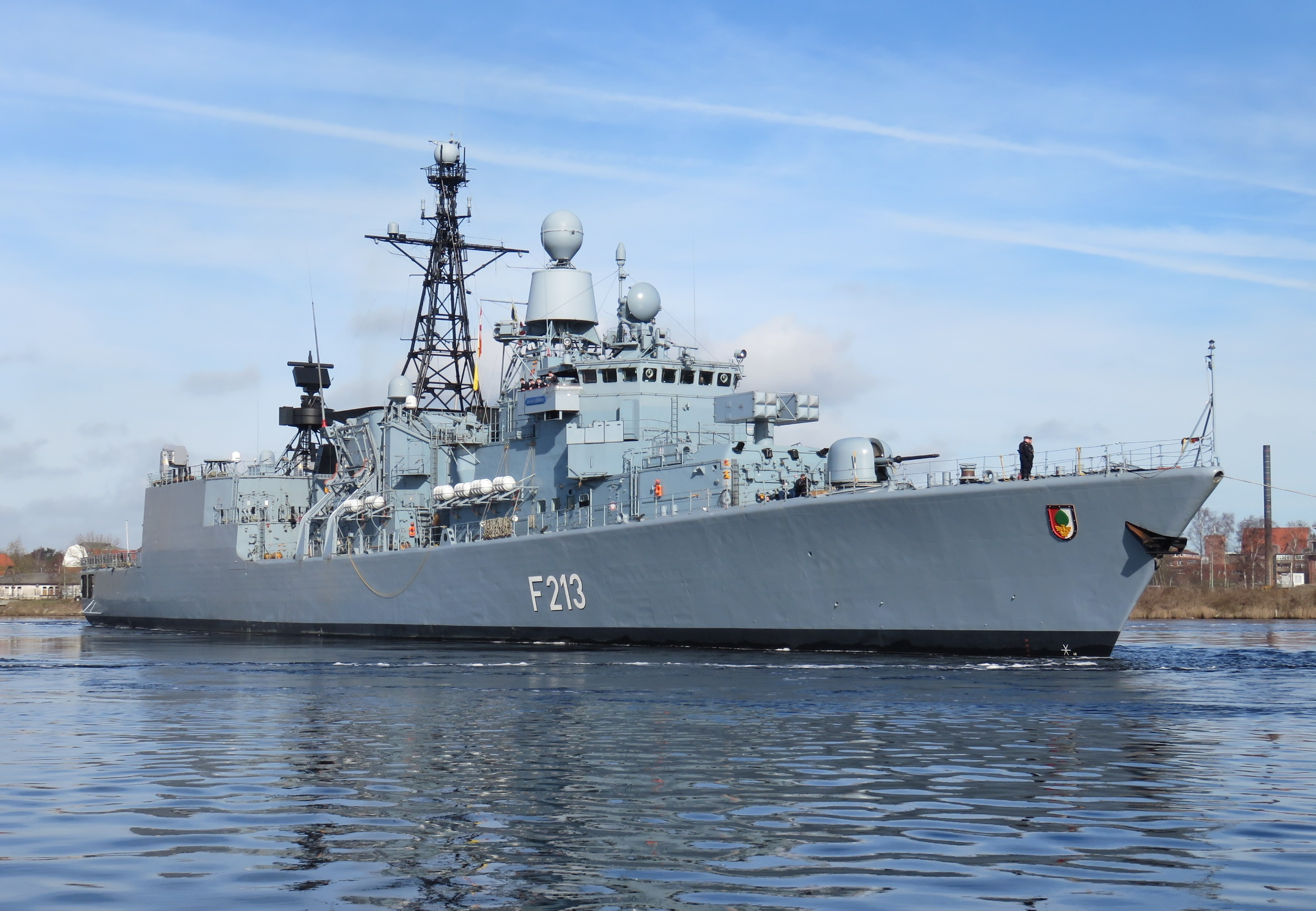
- Augsburg in 2015

History

Germany
- Name: Augsburg
- Builder: Bremer Vulkan, Bremen
- Laid down: 4 April 1987
- Launched: 17 September 1987
- Commissioned: 3 October 1989
- Decommissioned: 30 June 2019
- Identification: MMSI number: 211210200; Pennant number: F213; Call sign: DRAN
- Status: decommissioned

General characteristics
- Class & type: Bremen-class frigate
- Displacement: 3,680 tonnes (3,620 long tons)
- Length: 130.50 m (428 ft 2 in)
- Beam: 14.60 m (47 ft 11 in)
- Draft: 6.30 m (20 ft 8 in)
- Installed power: CODOG (Combined diesel or gas); 2 × MTU 20V956 TB92 diesel engines, 8.14 MW (10,920 hp) total; 2 × General Electric LM2500 gas turbines, 38 MW (51,000 hp) total; 2 × Renk STG 150-50 gearboxes, 10:1 (diesel) and 720:47 (turbine); 4 × Deutz MWM diesel-generators, 750 kW (1,010 hp)
- Propulsion: 2 × propeller shafts, controllable pitch, five-bladed Sulzer-Escher propellers
- Speed: 30 knots (56 km/h; 35 mph)
- Range: more than 4,000 nmi (7,400 km; 4,600 mi) at 18 knots (33 km/h; 21 mph)
- Complement: 202 crew plus 20 aviation
- Sensors & processing systems: 1 × EADS TRS-3D air search radar (three-dimensional); 1 × WM 25 combined surface search and fire control radar I/J band; 1 × Thales Nederland STIR 180 fire-control radar I/J/K band; 1 × Kelvin Hughes Nucleus 5000 I band navigation radar; 1 × STN Atlas DSQS-23BZ hull-mounted sonar
- Electronic warfare & decoys: ESM/ECM EADS FL 1800S; 2 × SCLAR decoys; SLQ-25 Nixie torpedo decoy
- Armament: Naval guns: 1 × OTO-Melara 76 mm dual-purpose gun; 2 × Mauser MLG27 27 mm autocannons; Antiaircraft warfare: 1 × 8-cell launch system, 16 × Sea Sparrow surface to air missiles; CIWS: 2 × MK 49 launcher, 21 × RAM each; Anti-ship missiles: 2 × quadruple Harpoon anti-ship missile launchers; Anti-submarine warfare: 2 × Mark 32 324 mm twin torpedo launchers, 8 × DM4A1 or Mark 46 torpedo
- Aircraft carried: Place for 2 Sea Lynx Mk.88A helicopters equipped with torpedoes, air-to-surface missiles Sea Skua, and/or heavy machine gun.

Augsburg is a Bremen-class frigate of the German Navy. The vessel was laid down in April 1987 by Bremer Vulkan, in Bremen, Germany and launched on 17 September 1987. The vessel was commissioned on 3 October 1989. The ship has been deployed as part of Operation Enduring Freedom – Horn of Africa and Operation Atalanta in the Middle East and Indian Ocean and has seen service in the Mediterranean Sea. The vessel is currently based at Wilhelmshaven, Germany.

== Construction and commissioning ==
Augsburg was laid in April 1987 at the yards of Bremer Vulkan, Bremen and launched on 17 September 1987. After undergoing trials Augsburg was commissioned on 3 October 1989. She is currently based at Wilhelmshaven as part of 4. Fregattengeschwader, forming a component of Einsatzflottille 2. She has the nickname "Wilde 13", a reference to her pennant number, and the German children's story Jim Button and the Wild 13, which was turned into a production by the marionette theatre Augsburger Puppenkiste.

== Service ==
After commissioning Augsburg was initially assigned to 2. Fregattengeschwader, being transferred to 4. Fregattengeschwader on 9 January 2006. She has deployed several times as part of Operation Enduring Freedom – Horn of Africa, including service in the Mediterranean Sea. From 3 April 2013 to 30 August 2013 Augsburg, commanded by Fregattenkapitän Bernhard Veitl, spent five and a half months supporting Operation Atalanta. On 11 February 2014 Augsburg deployed from Wilhelmshaven with the frigates Mecklenburg-Vorpommern and Hamburg, the corvette Oldenburg and the storeship Frankfurt am Main to take part in the navy's annual training and exercises. These concluded at Kiel on 20 June 2014, during which time the ships carried out manoeuvres as far north as the Arctic Circle and as far south as the Equator, visiting 13 ports in nine countries.

On 9 April 2014 Augsburg was released from the training exercises in order to serve as an escort for the US special purpose vessel MV Cape Ray in the eastern Mediterranean. Cape Ray was transporting Syrian chemical weapons for destruction. On 20 November 2015, Augsburg sailed from Wilhelmshaven with the replenishment ship Berlin to take part in Operation Sophia in the Mediterranean. She was relieved from this duty on 3 December by the minehunter Weilheim.

On 6 December 2015 Augsburg deployed as an escort for the French aircraft carrier Charles de Gaulle during its operations against the military group Islamic State of Iraq and the Levant. She was released from her escort duties on 11 March, her crew being awarded the French Overseas Medal for their service, and returned to Wilhelmshaven on 24 March. On 30 August 2016 Augsburg redeployed in the Mediterranean with the Charles De Gaulle carrier group on anti-ISIL operations. She left the carrier group on 14 November to carry out patrols. She spent four days participating in NATO's maritime surveillance Operation Sea Guardian, before returning to Wilhelmshaven on 25 November 2016. On 17 September 2018 she sailed from Wilhelmshaven to replace the tender Mosel in Operation Sophia.
