= German frigate Schleswig-Holstein =

Brandenburg-class frigate, Germany, 1995

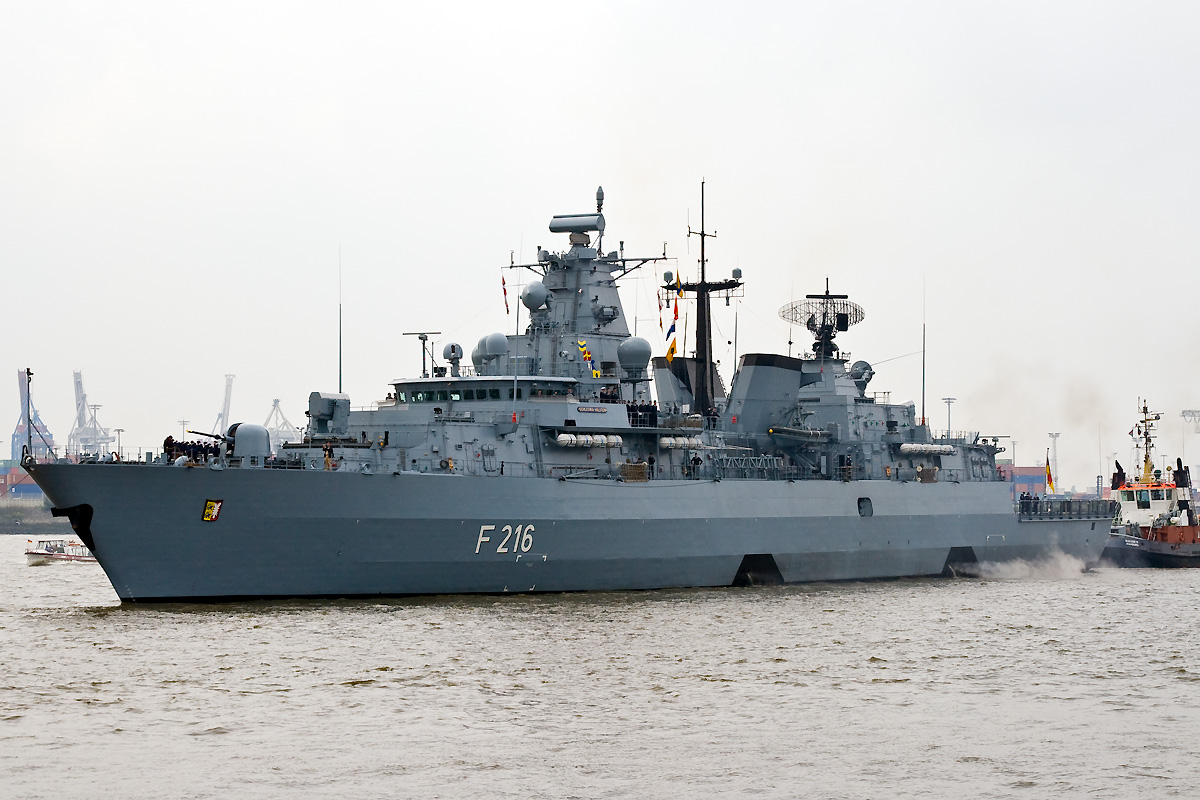
- Schleswig-Holstein in Hamburg Harbour, 2008

History

Germany
- Name: Schleswig-Holstein
- Namesake: Schleswig-Holstein
- Builder: Howaldtswerke-Deutsche Werft, Kiel
- Laid down: 1 July 1993
- Launched: 8 June 1994
- Commissioned: 24 November 1995
- Identification: Pennant number: F216; MMSI number: 211210170; Call sign: DRAI
- Status: Active

General characteristics
- Class & type: Brandenburg-class frigate
- Displacement: 3,600 tons (4,490t full load)
- Length: 138.85 metres (455.5 ft)
- Beam: 16.7 metres (55 ft)
- Draught: 4.35 metres (14.3 ft) (6.3 metres (21 ft) over sonar)
- Propulsion: CODOG (combined diesel or gas); two propeller shafts, controllable pitch propellers; two MTU 20V 956 TB92 diesel-engines, 8.14 MW each; two General Electric LM2500 gas turbines, 38 MW total; two Renk BGS 178 Lo gearboxes
- Speed: >29 knots (54 km/h; 33 mph)
- Range: 4,000 nautical miles (7,400 km; 4,600 mi)at 18 knots (33 km/h; 21 mph)
- Complement: 26 officers, 193 enlisted
- Sensors & processing systems: One Thales LW08 air search D band radar; one Thales SMART-S air/surface surveillance F band radar; two Thales STIR 180 fire-control radar; two Raytheon Redpath I band navigation radar; one STN Atlas DSQS-23BZ hull-mounted sonar; one STN Atlas TASS 6-3 (LFTASS) towed array sonar (Bayern only)
- Electronic warfare & decoys: 1 EADS FL 1800S ECM suite; two OTO-Melara SCLAR launcher; four TKWA/MASS (Multi Ammunition Softkill System) decoy launcher (currently under procurement)
- Armament: Naval guns: One OTO-Melara 76 mm/62Mk-75 multi-purpose naval gun; Two Mauser BK-27 27 mm rapid-fire cannons; Antiaircraft warfare: One Mk 41 Mod 3 vertical launch system for 16 Sea Sparrow antiaircraft missiles (ESSM planned); CIWS: Two x Mk 49 launcher for 21 x Rolling Airframe Missiles; Anti-ship missiles: Four x MM38 Exocet anti-ship missiles (To be replaced by 8 Harpoon missiles); Antisubmarine warfare: Four 324 mm torpedo tubes, Mk 46 torpedoes
- Aircraft carried: Two Sea Lynx helicopters equipped with ASW torpedoes, or air-to-surface missiles Sea Skua, and a heavy machine gun.

Schleswig-Holstein is a Brandenburg-class frigate of the German Navy.

== Construction and commissioning ==
Schleswig-Holstein and the three other frigates of the Brandenburg class were designed as replacements for the Hamburg-class destroyers. She was laid in 1993 at the yards of Howaldtswerke-Deutsche Werft, Kiel and launched in June 1994. After undergoing trials, she was commissioned on 24 November 1995, and assigned to 6. Fregattengeschwader. After the naval structure was reorganised, Schleswig-Holstein was assigned to 2. Fregattengeschwader, based at Wilhelmshaven.

== Service ==
Schleswig-Holstein was deployed as part of the Maritime Task Force of the United Nations Interim Force in Lebanon between September and December 2009, serving as the flagship of the taskforce commander, Flotilla Admiral Jürgen Mannhardt. On 19 May 2010 she replaced the frigate Emden on deployment with Operation Atalanta off the Horn of Africa. She spent 124 days with the taskforce there, and together with the EUNAVFOR flagship De Grasse, was involved in escorting ships from the World Food Programme and the African Union Mission in Somalia. Schleswig-Holstein was replaced in this task by the frigate Köln in September 2010.

From June to December 2014 Schleswig-Holstein deployed on behalf of the Organisation for the Prohibition of Chemical Weapons, escorting the MV Cape Ray across the Mediterranean, replacing the previous escort, the frigate Augsburg. The Cape Ray was carrying out the destruction of Syrian chemical weapons. On the completion of this mission Schleswig-Holstein then deployed on the Cougar 2014 exercises in the Mediterranean and Persian Gulf, in which she escorted a British amphibious combat group consisting of HMS Ocean, HMS Bulwark, RFA Lyme Bay and RFA Wave Knight.

From June to November 2015 Schleswig-Holstein was deployed with the EU Navfor Med mission in the Mediterranean, assisting in rescuing migrants from shipwrecks and other dangerous situations. On 22 July she rescued 111 people. On 24 August a pregnant Somali woman rescued from a refugee boat by HMS Enterprise gave birth to a child aboard the ship, the first to ever be born aboard a ship of the German Navy. At the suggestion of the attending medical personnel, the child was named Sophia. This was a name associated with German naval ships named Schleswig-Holstein, as the earlier destroyer Schleswig-Holstein had used the radio call sign "Sophie X". This was itself a reference to the early battleship SMS Schleswig-Holstein, which had been dedicated to Princess Louise Sophie of Schleswig-Holstein-Sonderburg-Augustenburg, as have later ships of the name. EUNAVFORMED was subsequently renamed "Operation Sophia", after the baby born aboard Schleswig-Holstein. After participating in the rescue of a total of 4,224 shipwrecked refugees Schleswig-Holstein returned to her home port of Wilhelmshaven on 9 November 2015.
