= German frigate Bayern =

German Navy frigate

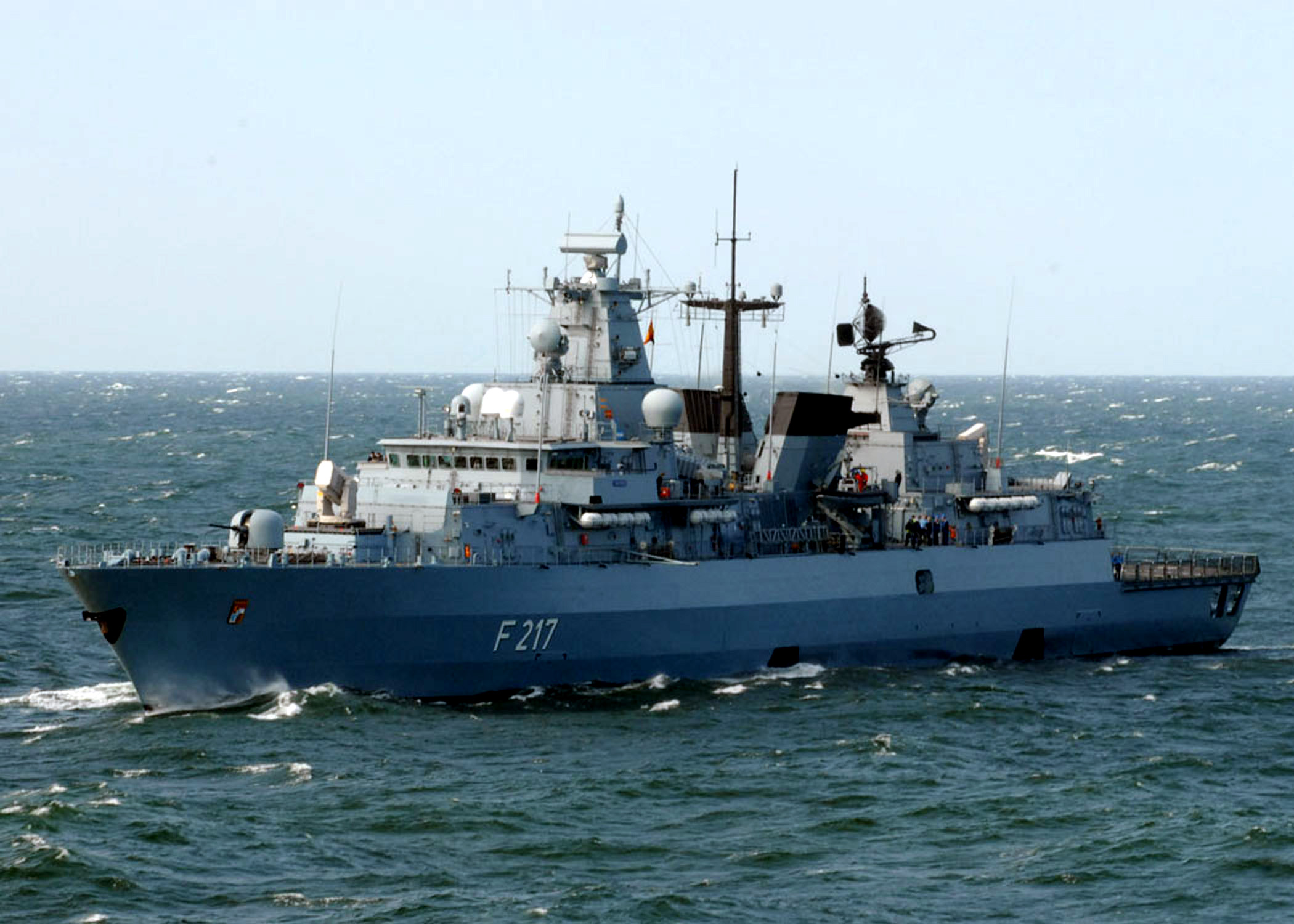
- Bayern in 2008

History

Germany
- Name: Bayern
- Namesake: Bavaria
- Builder: Nordseewerke, Emden
- Laid down: 16 December 1993
- Launched: 30 June 1994
- Commissioned: 15 June 1996
- Identification: MMSI number: 211210180; Pennant number: F217; Call sign: DRAJ
- Status: Active

General characteristics
- Class & type: Brandenburg-class frigate
- Displacement: 3,600 tons (4,490t full load)
- Length: 138.85 metres (455.5 ft)
- Beam: 16.7 metres (55 ft)
- Draught: 4.35 metres (14.3 ft) (6.3 metres (21 ft) over sonar)
- Propulsion: CODOG (combined diesel or gas); two propeller shafts, controllable pitch propellers; two MTU 20V 956 TB92 diesel-engines, 8.14 MW each; two General Electric LM2500 gas turbines, 38 MW total; two Renk BGS 178 Lo gearboxes
- Speed: >29 knots (54 km/h; 33 mph)
- Range: 4,000 nautical miles (7,400 km; 4,600 mi)at 18 knots (33 km/h; 21 mph)
- Complement: 26 officers, 193 enlisted
- Sensors & processing systems: One Thales LW08 air search D band radar; one Thales SMART-S air/surface surveillance F band radar; two Thales STIR 180 fire-control radar; two Raytheon Redpath I band navigation radar; one STN Atlas DSQS-23BZ hull-mounted sonar; one STN Atlas TASS 6-3 (LFTASS) towed array sonar
- Electronic warfare & decoys: 1 EADS FL 1800S ECM suite; two OTO-Melara SCLAR launcher; four TKWA/MASS (Multi Ammunition Softkill System) decoy launcher (currently under procurement)
- Armament: Naval guns: One OTO-Melara 76 mm/62Mk-75 multi-purpose naval gun; Two Mauser BK-27 27 mm rapid-fire cannons; Antiaircraft warfare: One Mk 41 Mod 3 vertical launch system for 16 Sea Sparrow antiaircraft missiles (ESSM planned); CIWS: Two x Mk 49 launcher for 21 x Rolling Airframe Missiles; Anti-ship missiles: Four x MM38 Exocet anti-ship missiles (To be replaced by 8 Harpoon missiles); Antisubmarine warfare: Four 324 mm torpedo tubes, Mk 46 torpedoes
- Aircraft carried: Two Sea Lynx helicopters equipped with ASW torpedoes, or air-to-surface missiles Sea Skua, and a heavy machine gun.

Bayern is a Brandenburg-class frigate of the German Navy.

== Construction and commissioning ==
Bayern and the three other frigates of the Brandenburg class were designed as replacements for the Hamburg-class destroyers. She was laid down in 1993 at the yards of Nordseewerke, Emden and launched in June 1994. She was christened by Karin Stoiber, the wife of the then Minister-President of Bavaria Edmund Stoiber. After undergoing trials she was commissioned on 15 June 1996, and assigned to 6. Fregattengeschwader. After the naval structure was reorganised, Bayern was assigned to 2. Fregattengeschwader, based at Wilhelmshaven.

== Service ==
Bayern has been involved in several foreign missions since her commissioning, including deploying in the Adriatic in 1999 during Operation Allied Force, the NATO bombing of Yugoslavia. Between April and November 2005 she served as the flagship for Wolfgang Kalähne, Commander-in-Chief of Standing NATO Maritime Group 2. Bayern was deployed with the Group in various manoeuvres, and to support Operation Active Endeavour. Between September 2007 to March 2008 Bayern was the flagship of Hans-Christian Luther, Commander-in-Chief of the Maritime Task Force of the United Nations Interim Force in Lebanon. In late January 2008 Bayern came to the assistance of the container ship Gevo Victory, which was in distress off the Lebanese coast. Bayern rescued 14 crew members.

On 18 July 2011 Bayern left Wilhelmshaven to join Operation Atalanta, the anti-piracy mission off the Horn of Africa. She arrived on station on 13 August, with Thomas Jugel taking over command of the taskforce, with Bayern as his flagship. Bayern was deployed in support of the operation until 6 December, and then returned to Wilhelmshaven, arriving on 22 December 2011. Her next deployment was as flagship of Thorsten Kähler, commander of Standing NATO Maritime Group 2. This lasted until 1 June 2012, after which she took part in exercises, and manoeuvres related to Operation Active Endeavour.

Bayern deployed once more, on 26 January 2015, to join Operation Atalanta, remaining on station until returning to her home port on 3 July 2015. She returned to Operation Atalanta on 23 March, serving as the flagship of Flotilla Admiral Jan Christian Kaack. This deployment lasted for five months, Bayern sailing some 32,000 nautical miles, before returning home on 8 August 2016. On 7 March 2018, Bayern sailed from Wilhelmshaven to rejoin Standing NATO Maritime Group 2 in the Aegean Sea, replacing the replenishment ship Frankfurt am Main. Bayern was expected to complete this deployment at the end of August 2018.

In August 2021, Bayern was deployed to the South China Sea in an effort to "show more presence in the Indo-Pacific region". The Bayern arrived in Fremantle Harbour on 28 September 2021 for a long-pre-planned one-week visit, thereby becoming the first German navy ship to visit Australia since the Gorch Fock berthed in Sydney in 1988. After China had denied the ship permission to dock in Shanghai, the Bayern's visit to Australia had been extended to a second port, with the ship scheduled to head to Darwin from Fremantle.
