= Brandenburg-class frigate =

Class of anti-submarine frigates in service with German navy

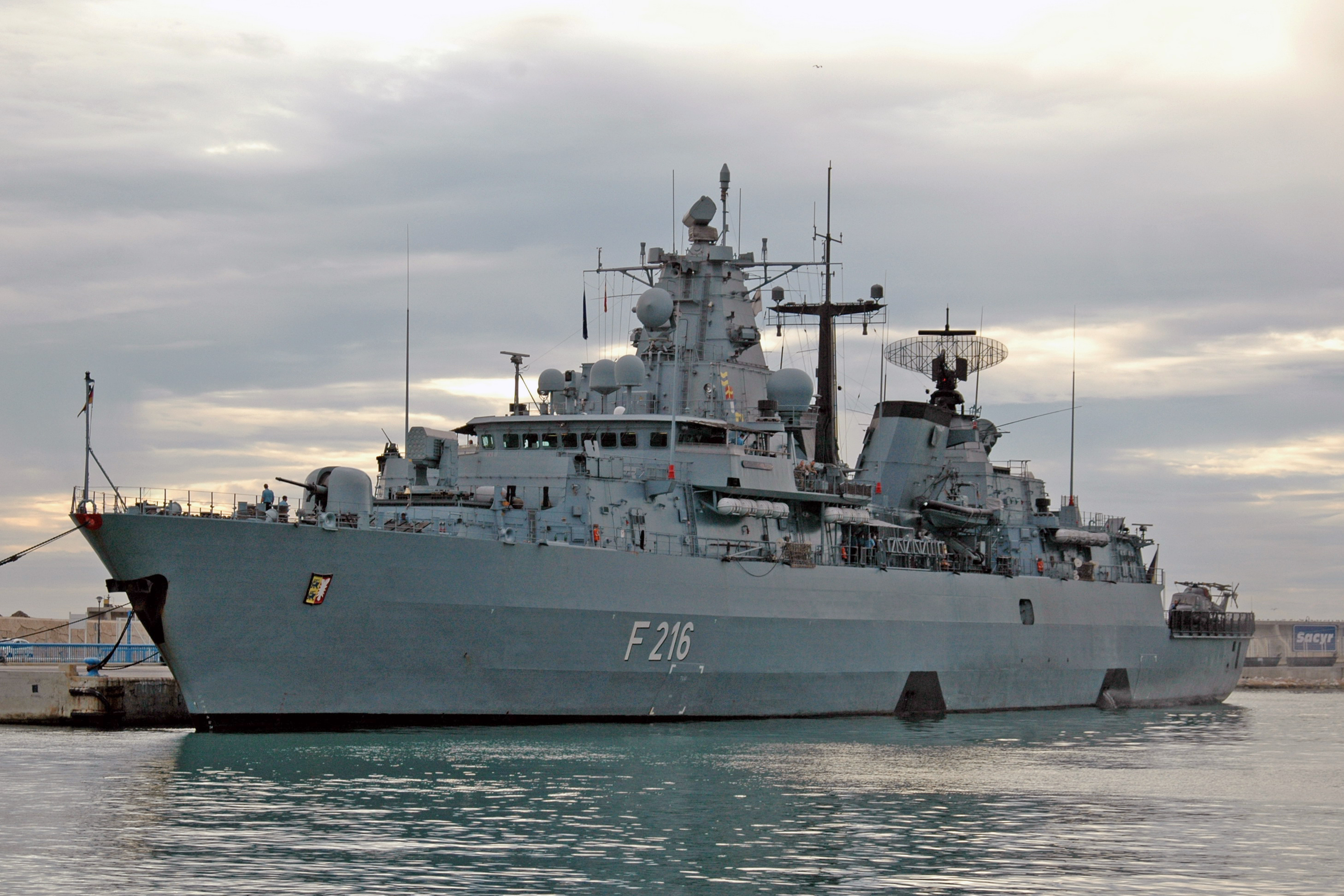
- Schleswig-Holstein on 26 September 2010

Class overview
- Name: Brandenburg class
- Builders: Blohm + Voss; Howaldtswerke; Nordseewerke; Bremer Vulkan
- Operators: German Navy
- Preceded by: Hamburg class
- Succeeded by: Niedersachsen class (cancelled); MEKO A-200 DEU class (actual)
- Cost: €303 million per unit
- Built: 1992–1996
- In commission: 1994–present
- Completed: 4
- Active: 4

General characteristics
- Type: Frigate
- Displacement: 3,600 tons (4,490 t full load)
- Length: 138.85 m (455 ft 7 in)
- Beam: 16.7 m (54 ft 9 in)
- Draught: 4.35 m (14 ft 3 in) (6.3 m (20 ft 8 in) over sonar)
- Propulsion: CODOG (combined diesel or gas); two propeller shafts, controllable pitch propellers; two MTU 20V 956 TB92 diesel-engines, 8.14 MW each; two General Electric LM2500 gas turbines, 38 MW total; two Renk BGS 178 Lo gearboxes
- Speed: >29 knots (54 km/h; 33 mph)
- Range: 4,000 nmi (7,400 km; 4,600 mi) at 18 knots (33 km/h; 21 mph)
- Complement: 26 officers, 193 enlisted
- Sensors & processing systems: One Thales LW08 air search D band radar; one Thales SMART-S air/surface surveillance F band radar; two Thales STIR 180 fire-control radar; two Raytheon Redpath I band navigation radar; one STN Atlas DSQS-23BZ hull-mounted sonar; one STN Atlas TASS 6-3 (LFTASS) towed array sonar (Bayern only)
- Electronic warfare & decoys: 1 EADS FL 1800S ECM suite; four TKWA/MASS (Multi Ammunition Softkill System) decoy dispenser (replaced two OTO-Melara SCLAR dispensers in 2009)
- Armament: Naval guns: One OTO-Melara 76 mm/62 Mk 75 multi-purpose naval gun; Two Mauser BK-27 27 mm rapid-fire cannons; Anti-aircraft warfare: One Mk 41 Mod 3 vertical launch system for 16 Sea Sparrow antiaircraft missiles (ESSM planned); CIWS: Two Mk 49 launchers for 21 x Rolling Airframe Missiles; Anti-ship missiles: Two quadruple launchers for 8 x Harpoon anti-ship missiles) (replaced two twin launchers for 4 x MM38 Exocet missiles); Anti-submarine warfare: Four 324 mm torpedo tubes, Mk 46 torpedoes
- Aircraft carried: Two Sea Lynx helicopters equipped with ASW torpedoes, or air-to-surface missiles Sea Skua, and a heavy machine gun.

The F123 Brandenburg class is a class of German frigate. They were ordered by the German Navy in June 1989 and completed and commissioned between 1994 and 1996, replacing the Hamburg-class destroyers. The ships primarily carry out anti-submarine warfare (ASW), but they also contribute to local anti-aircraft defenses, the tactical command of squadrons, and surface-to-surface warfare operations. Together with the F124 Sachsen-class frigates, they are the mainstay of the German surface fleet.

== Project history ==
Despite having undergone a limited modernisation, the four Hamburg-class destroyers intended for escort duties in the North Sea and North Atlantic were technologically obsolete by the 1980s, lacking assets such as an on-board helicopter capable of searching for submarines and still relying on steam turbines and boilers for propulsion. A replacement was considered overdue.

Blohm + Voss was contracted to develop and build the ships to a clean-sheet design in 1989. Not taken up was the option of ordering a variant of the Bremen class modified with new systems, as offered by Bremer Vulkan, the lead contractor for that class of ships. Blohm + Voss and Bremer Vulkan had previously cooperated on a new F123 design to offer to the German Navy. At the time Vulkan director Friedrich Hennemann felt that Blohm + Voss had afterwards illegitimately presented the jointly developed design as their own.

The lead ship, Brandenburg was laid down in Hamburg in February 1992 and commissioned in October 1994. The last ship, Mecklenburg-Vorpommern was commissioned in December 1996.

== Design ==
=== General characteristics and machinery ===
The frigates are 138.85 meters (455 ft 7 in) long, have a maximum draft of 6.3 meters (20 ft 8 in) and a beam of 16.7 meters (54 ft 9 in). A combined diesel or gas propulsion system is used, combining two MTU diesel engines and two General Electric LM2500 gas turbines for a total installed power of 38 megawatts (51,000 hp). The ship achieves a maximum speed of more than 29 knots (54 km/h; 33 mph).

Signature reduction measures influenced the design, reducing the ships radar signature to a tenth of that of the Bremen-class frigates.

=== Armament ===
The primary anti-submarine weapons are Mark 46 torpedoes carried by the Sea Lynx helicopters stationed on board of the frigates. The torpedoes can also be launched from two twin launchers located behind the ships' funnels.

For defense against anti-ship missiles and aircraft, two Mark 41 vertical launching system modules with 8 cells each, 16 in total are located in front of the bridge. They can accommodate 16 NATO Sea Sparrow missiles or up to 64 of the more modern Sea Sparrow-derived ESSM with a range of more than 50 km. Four ESSM can be packaged in a single cell. Space is reserved for two additional Mk 41 modules, however it has not been utilised. Two Mark 49 rolling airframe missile (RAM) launchers with 21 missiles each are dedicated to short range air defense against missiles. They are located in the ships' fore and aft.

Two quadruple launchers for eight Harpoon anti-ship missiles are located between main mast and funnels. They replaced two double launchers for four MM38 Exocet missiles.

An OTO Melara 76 mm compact naval gun is located in front of the frontal RAM launcher. The ships also feature two MLG27 autocannons which replaced the previous Rh-202, as well as four machine guns.

=== Sensors and countermeasures ===
The radar suite consists of Thales Nederland 2D air search (LW 08), 3D multi function (SMART-S) and two STIR 180 fire control radars in addition to two Raytheon navigation radars. The SMART-S tracks aerial and surface objects and can cue targets to the STIR fire control radars tasked with illuminating the tracked object for the semi-active (Evolved) Sea Sparrow missiles. The STIR radars are located below the SMART-S and in front of the LW 08 radars.

Electronic countermeasures are provided by an EADS FL-1800S ECM suite.

The class is fitted with an Atlas Elektronik DSQS-23BZ bow sonar. The ships were to receive low-frequency active sonars under the Franco-German LFTASS programme but France withdrew in 2000 and is now using a derivative of the British Sonar 2087; Bayern received the prototype TASS 6-3 sonar but it seems unlikely that more units will be ordered in the current budget environment.

=== Modernisation ===
From 2010 on, the F123 class underwent an upgrade under the auspices of the Fähigkeitsanpassung FüWES (FAF) project. The primary component of this program concerns the combat management system, for which SABRINA 21, a version of the Thales Nederland TACTICOS system has been installed. At the same time, the ships received an IFF upgrade to the EADS/Hensoldt MSSR 2000 I secondary radar system. However, its primary radars, specifically its long-range 2D search radar, the LW 08, and its medium-range 3D surveillance radar, the SMART-S, were excluded at the time.

In July 2021, Swedish defense company Saab was awarded a contract over the delivery and installation of their Sea Giraffe 4A (replacing the LW 08), Sea Giraffe 1X (replacing the SMART-S) and CEROS 200 Fire Control Radar as well as the 9LV combat management system and an IFF system replacement. The work is to be carried out at the facilities of German shipyard Abeking & Rasmussen, with logistical support by ESG.

== Ships ==
All ships of the class are named after German Bundesländer and are based in Wilhelmshaven as 2. Fregattengeschwader (2nd Frigate Squadron) of the German Navy.

Pennant number	Name	Call sign	Laid down	Shipyard	Launched	Commissioned
F215	Brandenburg	DRAH	11 February 1992	Blohm + Voss	28 August 1992	14 October 1994
F216	Schleswig-Holstein	DRAI	1 July 1993	Howaldtswerke	8 June 1994	24 November 1995
F217	Bayern	DRAJ	16 December 1993	Nordseewerke	30 June 1994	15 June 1996
F218	Mecklenburg-Vorpommern	DRAK	23 November 1993	Bremer Vulkan	23 February 1995	6 December 1996

== Service history ==
On the morning of 9 December 2015, Mecklenburg-Vorpommern was transiting the Kiel Canal when she was involved in a collision with the container ship Nordic Bremen causing damage to both vessels. Mecklenburg-Vorpommern suffered a 4-meter (13 ft) gash along her bow at the level of the main deck, whilst Nordic Bremen fared better, having only to offload two damaged containers before continuing its voyage.

From August 2021 to February 2022, Bayern was traversing the Horn of Africa, Australia, and Japan on an Indo-Pacific deployment, engaging in numerous port calls on the way. The Japanese foreign minister Nobuo Kishi had previously called on Germany to send a warship to East Asia and exercise with Japan Maritime Self-Defense Force forces.

== See also ==
- List of frigate classes in service

Equivalent frigates of the same era

- Karel Doorman class
- Halifax class
- Anzac class
- Type 23
- Vasco da Gama class
- Neustrashimy class
- G class
- Kang Ding class

== Images ==
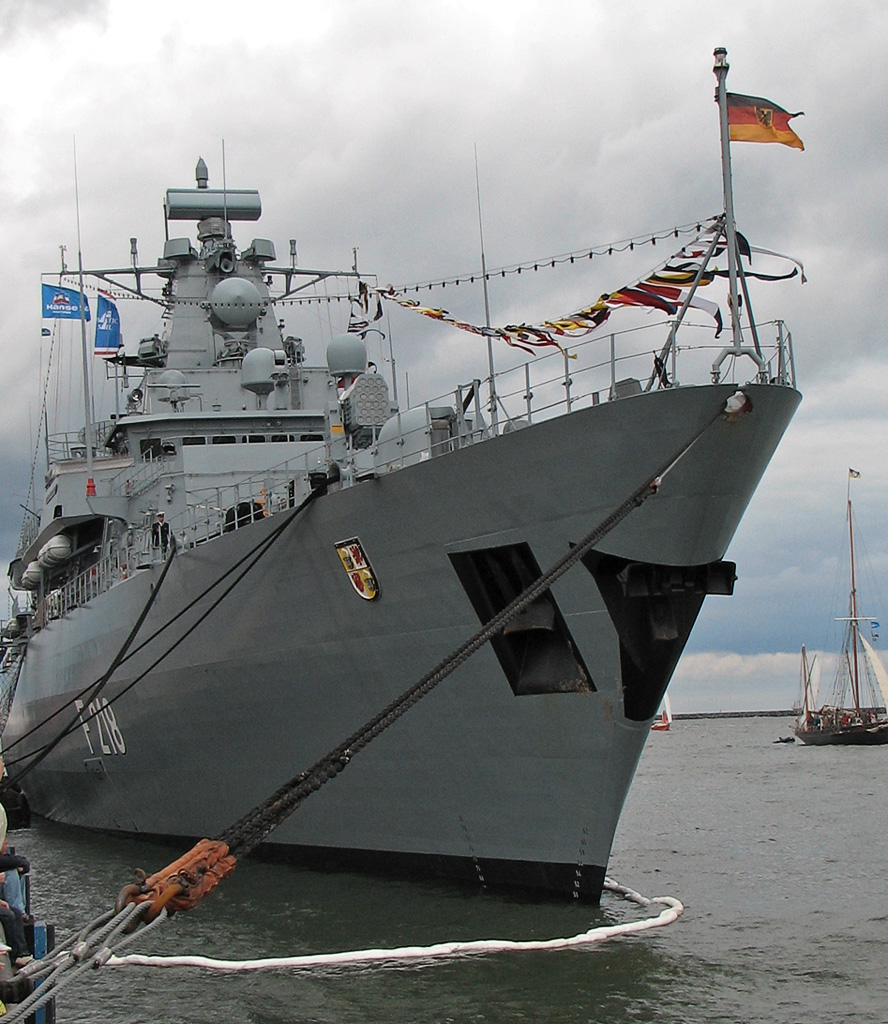
Mecklenburg-Vorpommern

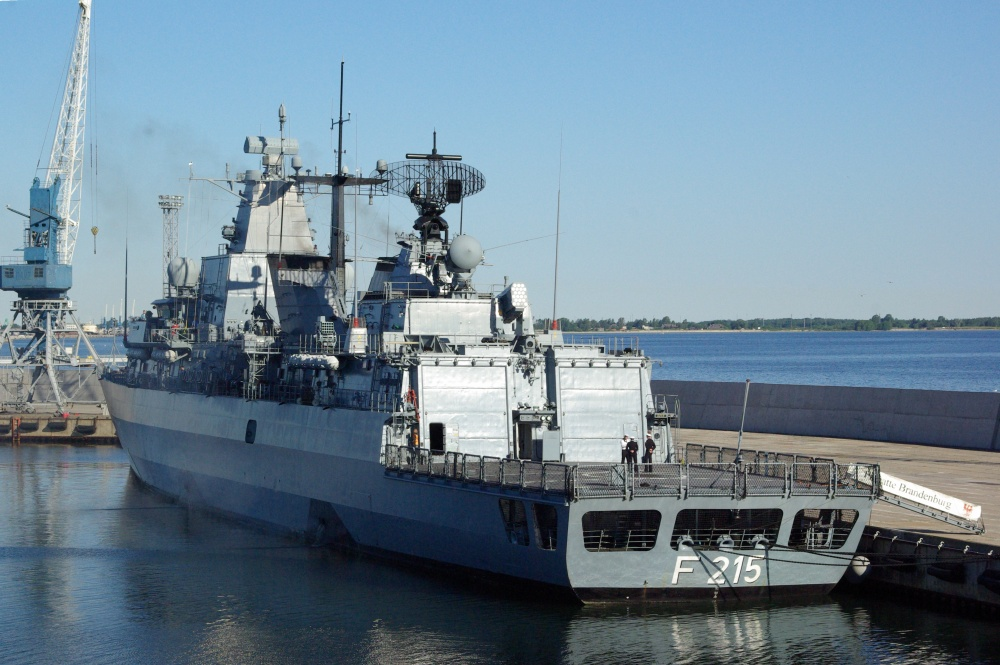
Brandenburg

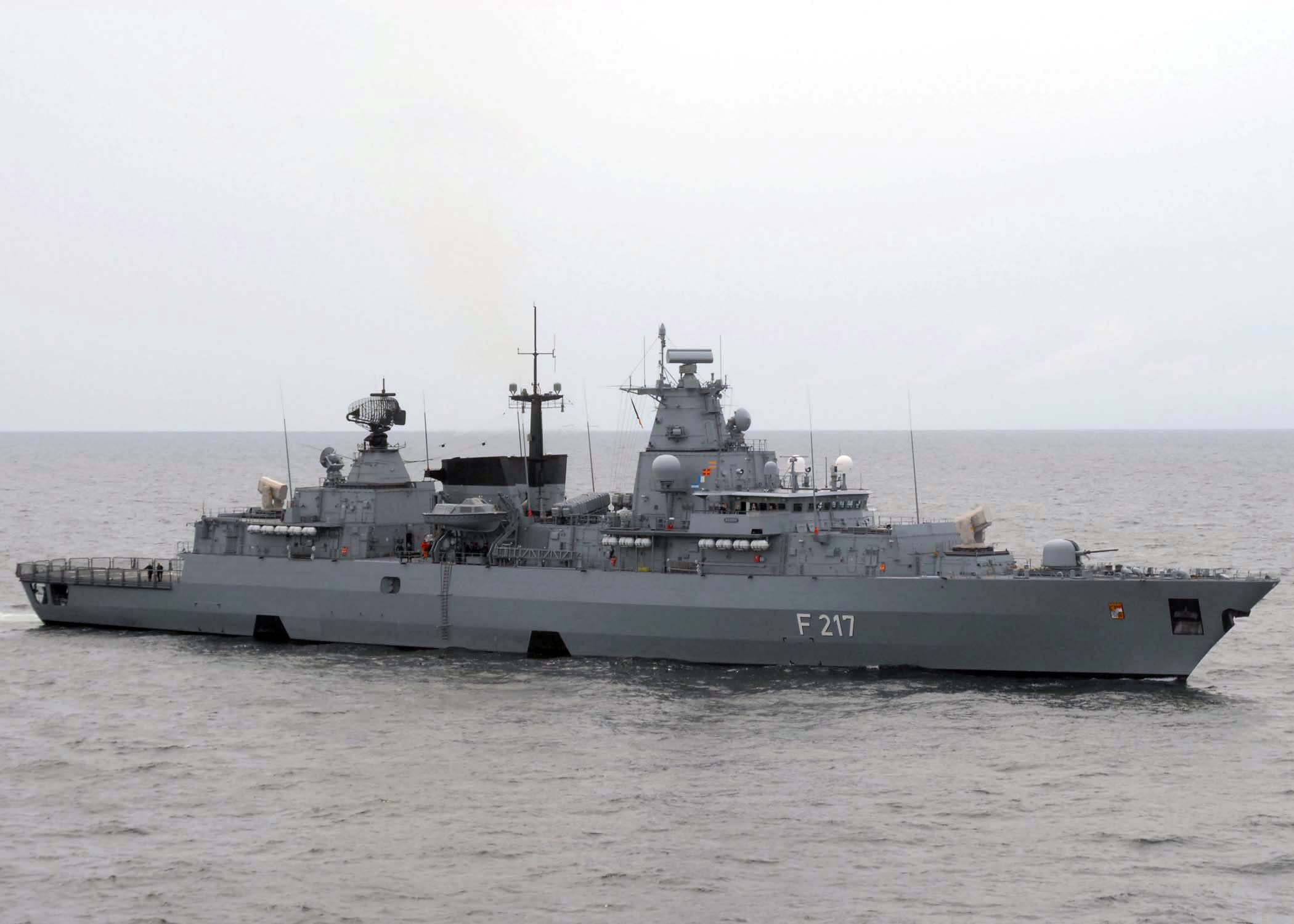
Bayern

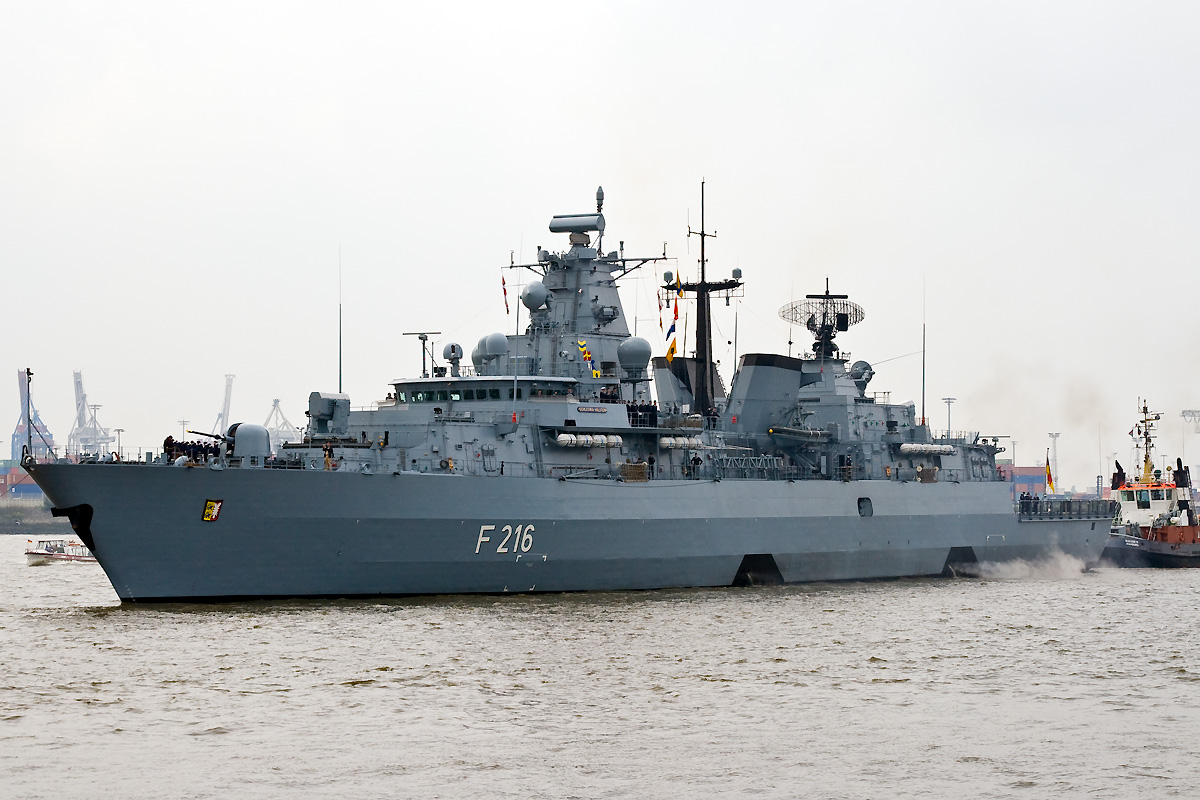
Schleswig-Holstein in Hamburg Harbor
