= German frigate Mecklenburg-Vorpommern =

1995 Brandenburg-class frigate

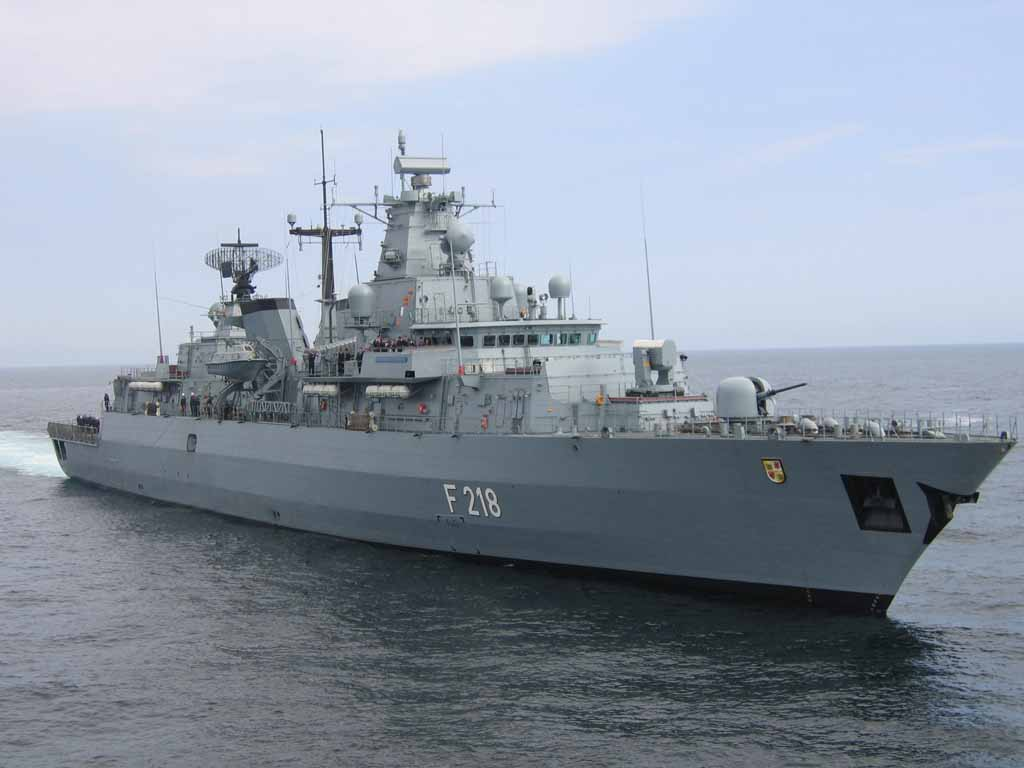
- Mecklenburg-Vorpommern in the German Bight, 2004

History

Germany
- Name: Mecklenburg-Vorpommern
- Namesake: Mecklenburg-Vorpommern
- Builder: Bremer Vulkan, Bremen-Vegesack
- Laid down: 23 November 1993
- Launched: 23 February 1995
- Commissioned: 6 December 1996
- Identification: Pennant number: F218; MMSI number: 211210190; Call sign: DRAK
- Status: Active

General characteristics
- Class & type: Brandenburg-class frigate
- Displacement: 3,600 tons (4,490t full load)
- Length: 138.85 metres (455.5 ft)
- Beam: 16.7 metres (55 ft)
- Draught: 4.35 metres (14.3 ft) (6.3 metres (21 ft) over sonar)
- Propulsion: CODOG (combined diesel or gas); two propeller shafts, controllable pitch propellers; two MTU 20V 956 TB92 diesel-engines, 8.14 MW each; two General Electric LM2500 gas turbines, 38 MW total; two Renk BGS 178 Lo gearboxes
- Speed: >29 knots (54 km/h; 33 mph)
- Range: 4,000 nautical miles (7,400 km; 4,600 mi)at 18 knots (33 km/h; 21 mph)
- Complement: 26 officers, 193 enlisted
- Sensors & processing systems: One Thales LW08 air search D band radar; one Thales SMART-S air/surface surveillance F band radar; two Thales STIR 180 fire-control radar; two Raytheon Redpath I band navigation radar; one STN Atlas DSQS-23BZ hull-mounted sonar; one STN Atlas TASS 6-3 (LFTASS) towed array sonar (Bayern only)
- Electronic warfare & decoys: 1 EADS FL 1800S ECM suite; two OTO-Melara SCLAR launcher; four TKWA/MASS (Multi Ammunition Softkill System) decoy launcher (currently under procurement)
- Armament: Naval guns: One OTO-Melara 76 mm/62Mk-75 multi-purpose naval gun; Two Mauser BK-27 27 mm rapid-fire cannons; Antiaircraft warfare: One Mk 41 Mod 3 vertical launch system for 16 Sea Sparrow antiaircraft missiles (ESSM planned); CIWS: Two x Mk 49 launcher for 21 x Rolling Airframe Missiles; Anti-ship missiles: Four x MM38 Exocet anti-ship missiles (To be replaced by 8 Harpoon missiles); Antisubmarine warfare: Four 324 mm torpedo tubes, Mk 46 torpedoes
- Aircraft carried: Two Sea Lynx helicopters equipped with ASW torpedoes, or air-to-surface missiles Sea Skua, and a heavy machine gun.

Mecklenburg-Vorpommern (F218) is a Brandenburg-class frigate of the German Navy.

== Construction and commissioning ==
Mecklenburg-Vorpommern and the three other frigates of the Brandenburg class were designed as replacements for the Hamburg-class destroyers. She was laid in 1993 at the yards of Bremer Vulkan, Bremen-Vegesack and launched in February 1995. Her sponsor was Annemarie Seite, wife of the then Minister-President of Mecklenburg-Vorpommern Berndt Seite. After undergoing trials she was commissioned on 6 December 1996, and assigned to 6. Fregattengeschwader. After the naval structure was reorganised, Mecklenburg-Vorpommern was assigned to 2. Fregattengeschwader, based at Wilhelmshaven.

== Service ==
Mecklenburg-Vorpommern deployed several times as part of NATO's Standing Naval Force Atlantic, in 1998 and in 2000. During her early service Mecklenburg-Vorpommern took part in two Destroyer Exercises (DESEX), DESEX 1999, involving the circumnavigation of South America, and DESEX 2002, a five-month training cruise with port visits to Souda Bay in Crete, Karachi in Pakistan, Mormugao and Cochin in India, Manila in the Philippines, Qingdao in China, Inchon in South Korea, Tokyo in Japan and Málaga in Spain. During her visit to Tokyo Mecklenburg-Vorpommern hosted a reception given aboard by German President Johannes Rau, and attended by the Japanese imperial couple, Emperor Akihito and Empress Michiko. On her return voyage to Europe Mecklenburg-Vorpommern participated in a missile exercise off Crete. In late 2002 she began a six-month deployment as part of Operation Enduring Freedom – Horn of Africa, which lasted into 2003.

Mecklenburg-Vorpommern resumed her work with Operation Enduring Freedom between November 2004 and April 2005, serving as the flagship for Flotilla Admiral Henning Hoops as commander of Combined Task Force 150. From November 2005 to May 2006 Mecklenburg-Vorpommern was part of in the Standing NATO Maritime Group 1, and for a time was the flagship of the Group's commander, German Commodore Wolfgang Kalahl and his international staff until the end of January 2006. SNMG 1 was integrated into Operation Active Endeavour at this time. In 2006 Mecklenburg-Vorpommern became the flagship of Andreas Krause, Commander in Chief of the Maritime Task Force supporting the United Nations Interim Force in Lebanon off the Lebanese coast. Mecklenburg-Vorpommern redeployed with Operation Enduring Freedom off the Horn of Africa once more between November 2008 and May 2009. From January to April she served as flagship of the Combined Task Force 150 under Flotilla Admiral Rainer Brinkmann.

On 28 November 2008, Mecklenburg-Vorpommern dispatched a helicopter to rescue three crew members from a Liberian-registered chemical tanker MV Biscaglia who had jumped overboard during a successful pirate attack in the Gulf of Aden. Later that day she came to the assistance of the cruise ship MS Astor, which was transiting the Gulf of Oman en route from Sharm-al-Sheikh in Egypt to Dubai. Mecklenburg-Vorpommern detected pirate speedboats apparently attempting to attack Astor, and manoeuvred into their path while they were three miles from the Astor. Warning bursts of machine gun fire were used to ward off the threat without those on the cruise ship becoming aware of the situation.

On 11 February 2014 Mecklenburg-Vorpommern deployed from Wilhelmshaven with the frigates Hamburg and Augsburg, the corvette Oldenburg and the storeship Frankfurt am Main to take part in the navy's annual training and exercises. These concluded at Kiel on 20 June 2014, during which time the ships carried out manoeuvrers as far north as the Arctic Circle and as far south as the Equator, visiting 13 ports in nine countries. In December 2015 the ship was awarded the flag band of the state of Mecklenburg-Vorpommern by the Minister-President of Mecklenburg-Vorpommern Erwin Sellering in Warnemünde. While transiting the Kiel Canal near Schülp bei Rendsburg on 9 December 2015 Mecklenburg-Vorpommern was involved in a collision with the Cypriot-flagged container ship Nordic Bremen. The frigate's bow was badly damaged.

On 16 August 2016 Mecklenburg-Vorpommern left Wilhelmshaven to participate in the EU Navfor Med mission in the Mediterranean from mid-September. She returned to Wilhelmshaven on 23 December, having briefly been part of the NATO's Operation Sea Guardian. She deployed again with EU Navfor Med on 7 August 2017. Mecklenburg-Vorpommern arrived at the Sicilian port of Augusta on 16 August 2017, taking over from the replenishment ship Rhein. Leadership of the force transferred at this time from Captain Marco Reinisch, to Mecklenburg-Vorpommern's commander Christian Schultze. Over the next few months Mecklenburg-Vorpommern gave assistance several times to migrant boats in distress, as part of Operation Sophia. On 13 September 2017 she rescued 134 people, on 25 October 158 people and on 2 November 323 people. A woman from Nigeria gave birth to a boy on 3 November 2017, with the support of the ship's medical team. On 1 November 2017, a patrol boat of the Libyan Coast Guard carried out aggressive manoeuvres near the Mecklenburg-Vorpommern. The head of the Libyan Coast Guard, Commodore Abdalh Toumia, later apologized. After five months on station Mecklenburg-Vorpommern was relieved by the frigate Sachsen in mid-January 2018. She arrived back in Wilhelmshaven on 26 January 2018, having sailed 29,000 nautical miles and rescued 700 people.
