= German frigate Brandenburg =

German frigate, launched 1992

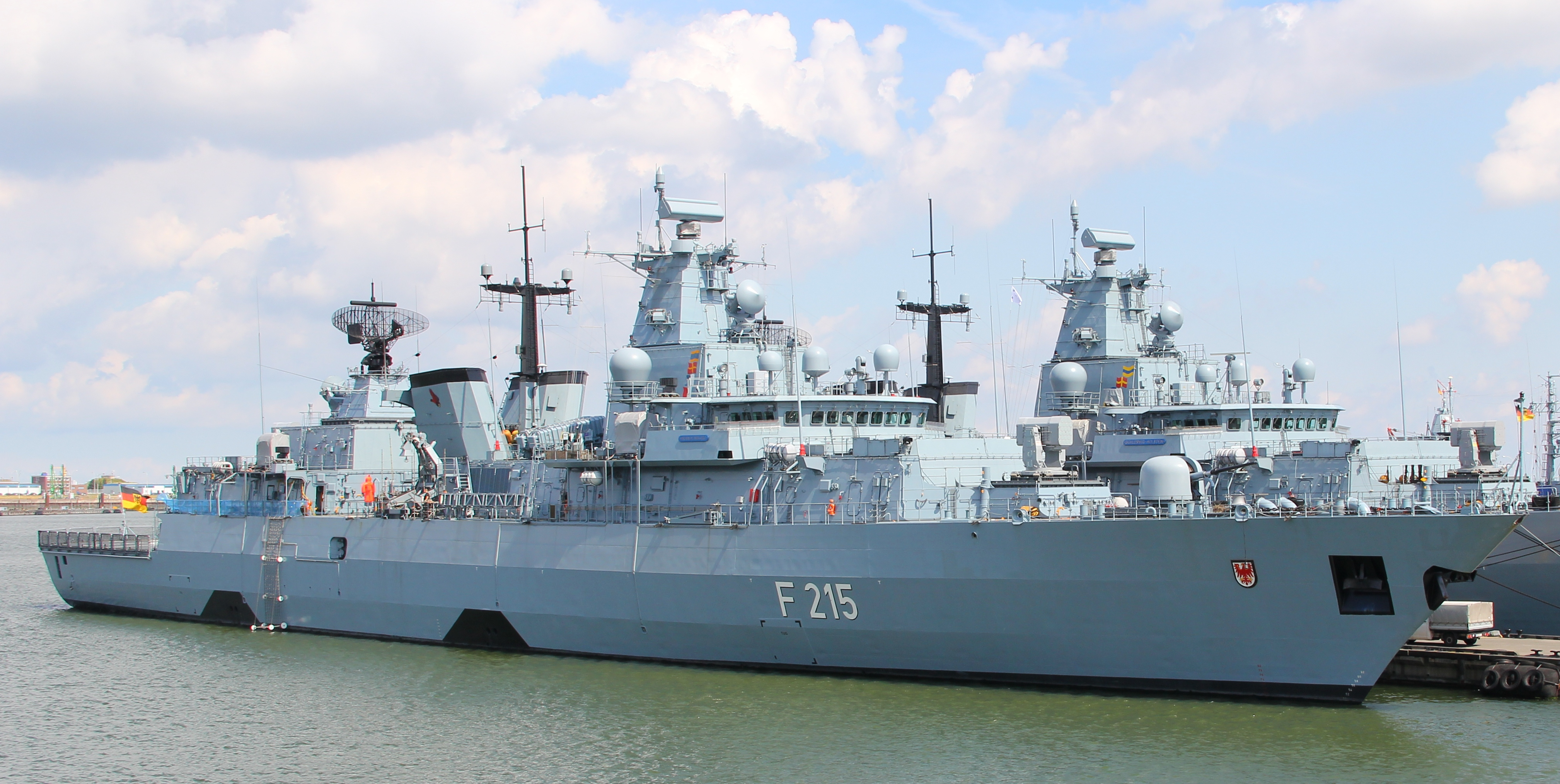
- Brandenburg in 2013

History

Germany
- Name: Brandenburg
- Builder: Blohm+Voss, Hamburg
- Laid down: 11 February 1992
- Launched: 28 August 1992
- Commissioned: 14 October 1994
- Identification: Pennant number: F215; MMSI number: 211210160; Call sign: DRAH
- Status: Active

General characteristics
- Class & type: Brandenburg-class frigate
- Displacement: 3,600 tons (4,490t full load)
- Length: 138.85 metres (455.5 ft)
- Beam: 16.7 metres (55 ft)
- Draught: 4.35 metres (14.3 ft) (6.3 metres (21 ft) over sonar)
- Propulsion: CODOG (combined diesel or gas); two propeller shafts, controllable pitch propellers; two MTU 20V 956 TB92 diesel-engines, 8.14 MW each; two General Electric LM2500 gas turbines, 38 MW total; two Renk BGS 178 Lo gearboxes
- Speed: >29 knots (54 km/h; 33 mph)
- Range: 4,000 nautical miles (7,400 km; 4,600 mi)at 18 knots (33 km/h; 21 mph)
- Complement: 26 officers, 193 enlisted
- Sensors & processing systems: One Thales LW08 air search D band radar; one Thales SMART-S air/surface surveillance F band radar; two Thales STIR 180 fire-control radar; two Raytheon Redpath I band navigation radar; one STN Atlas DSQS-23BZ hull-mounted sonar
- Electronic warfare & decoys: 1 EADS FL 1800S ECM suite; two OTO-Melara SCLAR launcher; four TKWA/MASS (Multi Ammunition Softkill System) decoy launcher (currently under procurement)
- Armament: Naval guns: One OTO-Melara 76 mm/62Mk-75 multi-purpose naval gun; Two Mauser BK-27 27 mm rapid-fire cannons; Antiaircraft warfare: One Mk 41 Mod 3 vertical launch system for 16 Sea Sparrow antiaircraft missiles (ESSM planned); CIWS: Two x Mk 49 launcher for 21 x Rolling Airframe Missiles; Anti-ship missiles: Four x MM38 Exocet anti-ship missiles (To be replaced by 8 Harpoon missiles); Antisubmarine warfare: Four 324 mm torpedo tubes, Mk 46 torpedoes
- Aircraft carried: Two Sea Lynx helicopters equipped with ASW torpedoes, or air-to-surface missiles Sea Skua, and a heavy machine gun.

Brandenburg is a Brandenburg-class frigate of the German Navy, and the lead ship of her class.

== Construction and commissioning ==
Brandenburg and the three other frigates of the Brandenburg class were designed as replacements for the Hamburg-class destroyers. She was laid in 1992 at the yards of Blohm+Voss, Hamburg and launched in August 1992. She was christened by Ingrid Stolpe, the wife of the then Minister-President of Brandenburg Manfred Stolpe. After undergoing trials she was commissioned on 14 October 1994, and assigned to 6. Fregattengeschwader. After the naval structure was reorganised, Brandenburg was assigned to 2. Fregattengeschwader, based at Wilhelmshaven.

== Service ==
Brandenburg spent some time in 2006 assigned to the maritime element of the United Nations Interim Force in Lebanon, serving as the flagship of the maritime taskforce commander Flotilla Admiral Andreas Krause. On 30 November 2006 she was visited by Foreign Minister Frank-Walter Steinmeier while docked in Larnaca, Cyprus. In 2009 she was deployed with Operation Atalanta, the anti-piracy patrols off the Horn of Africa. On 3 August 2009 the captured merchant vessel MV Hansa Stavanger was released from pirate control, with Brandenburg and the frigate Rheinland-Pfalz escorting her into port in Mombasa, Kenya. On 7 September Brandenburg launched a Sea Lynx helicopter to perform a reconnaissance mission on a suspected skiff just south of Mukalla, Yemen. Five suspects were observed throwing ladders and weapons overboard. Brandenburg fired warning shots across the skiff's bow after she refused to stop, and then disabled the skiff with gunfire. A team was sent aboard using a rigid-hulled inflatable boat, took control of the crew and seized a number of weapons. One of the suspects was injured by gunfire during the incident, and later died of his wounds onboard Brandenburg while receiving medical treatment. This was the first fatality caused by the Bundeswehr in the course of Operation Atalanta. The weaponry found on board the skiff was later destroyed, and the four surviving suspects released.

In 2010 Brandenburg, the frigate Niedersachsen, the replenishment ship Frankfurt am Main and the ammunition transport ship Westerwald carried out exercises together as part of the Einsatzausbildungsverband (Operational Training Association), with Brandenburg also participating in the German-South African missile exercises Good Hope IV. The following year Brandenburg and the other ships of the Einsatzausbildungsverband were temporarily involved in Operation Active Endeavour. In late February 2011 Brandenburg, Rheinland-Pfalz and the replenishment ship Berlin were ordered to the Libyan coast to assist in the evacuation of German citizens during the Libyan Civil War. They assisted in the evacuation of several hundred people, and also transported Egyptian citizens from the port of Gabes, Tunisia to Alexandria, Egypt.

From March to August 2014 Brandenburg was again deployed with Operation Atalanta, serving as the flagship of the Force Commander, Flotilla Admiral Jürgen Mills. On 20 March 2017 Brandenburg left Wilhelmshaven to replace the frigate Sachsen in Standing NATO Maritime Group 2, taking over from the Sachsen in early April at Souda, Crete. During her time with the Group she served as the flagship of the force's commander, Flotilla Admiral Axel Deertz. While leaving Piraeus on 17 April 2017, Brandenburg collided with a pier, damaging her steering gear and a propeller. The Greek tug Christos XVII escorted the damaged frigate to the floating dock at Paloukia, Salamis Naval Base. On 22 May 2017 Brandenburg was able to resume her patrol activity after repairs. On 4 July 2017, Deertz handed command of the Group over to a British commodore, and the Brandenburg ceased to be the flagship. As of 14 July 2025, the Brandenburg has returned to United Nations peacekeeping duties and is docked in Limassol, Cyprus.
