= List of ship commissionings in 2013 =

The list of ship commissionings in 2013 includes a chronological list of all ships commissioned in 2013.

	Operator	Ship	Flag	Class and type	Pennant	Other notes
21 January	German Navy	Oldenburg		Braunschweig-class corvette	F263	
28 February	German Navy	Erfurt		Braunschweig-class corvette	F262	
1 March	Royal Navy	Ambush		Astute-class submarine	S120	
21 March	Royal Navy	Defender		Type 45 destroyer	D36	
21 March	German Navy	Ludwigshafen am Rhein		Braunschweig-class corvette	F264	
6 April	United States Navy	Arlington		San Antonio-class amphibious transport dock	LPD-24	
4 May	United States Navy	Anchorage		San Antonio-class amphibious transport dock	LPD-23	
14 May	Russian Navy	Boikiy		Steregushchy-class corvette		
29 May	Marina Militare	Carlo Bergamini		Bergamini-class frigate	F590	
7 September	United States Navy	Minnesota		Virginia-class submarine	SSN-783	
26 September	Royal Navy	Duncan		Type 45 destroyer	D37	
16 November	Indian Navy	Vikramaditya		Modified Kiev class aircraft carrier	R33	
19 December	Marina Militare	Virginio Fasan		Bergamini-class frigate	F591	
