= German corvette Emden =

Braunschweig-class corvette

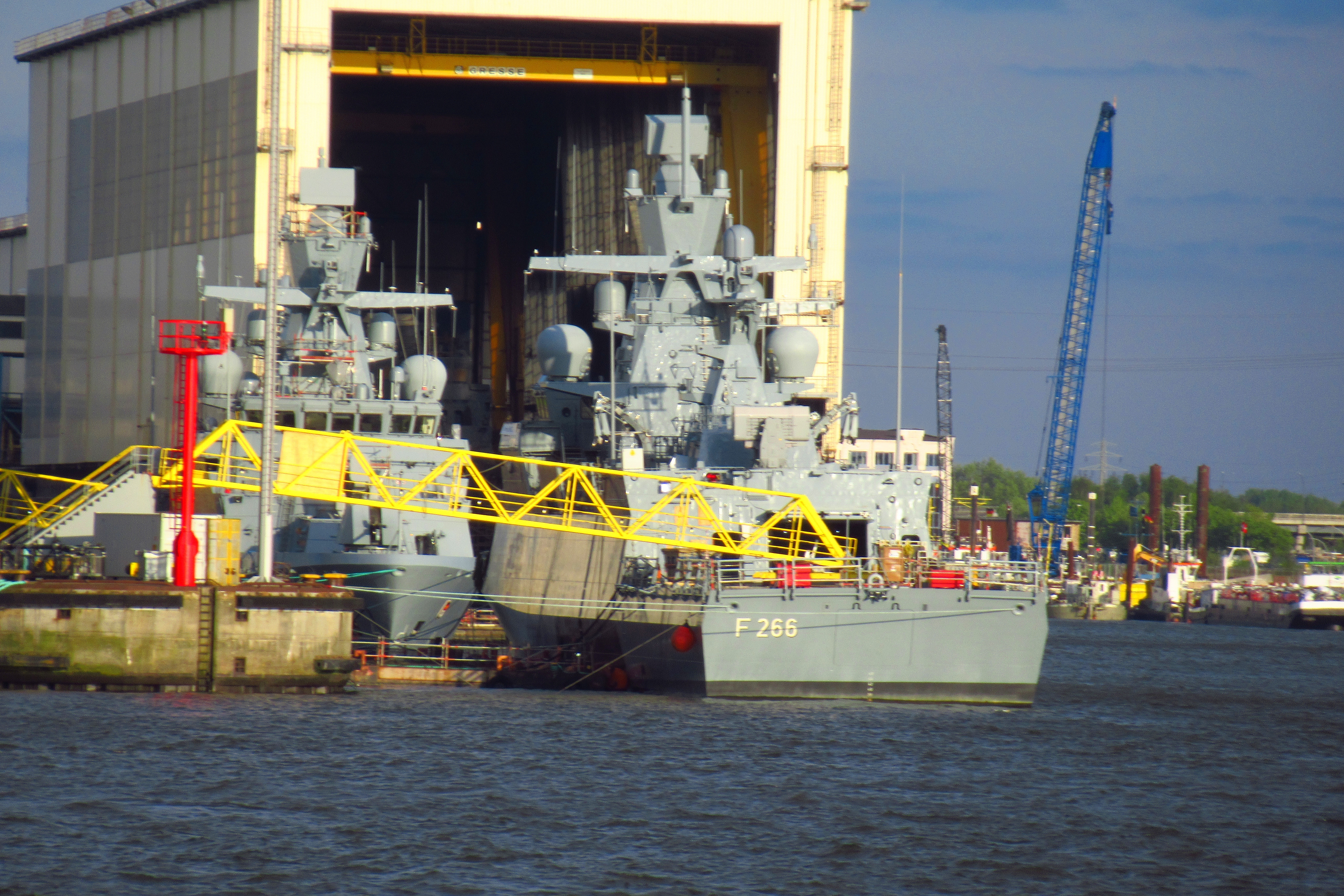
- Emden at the Blohm+Voss shipyard in Hamburg, 2023

History

Germany
- Name: Emden
- Namesake: Emden
- Ordered: September 2017
- Builder: Lürssen-Werft, Bremen
- Cost: €400 million
- Laid down: 30 January 2020
- Launched: 4 May 2023
- Commissioned: Expected, 2025
- Identification: Pennant number: F266
- Status: Under construction

General characteristics
- Type: Braunschweig-class corvette
- Displacement: 1,840 tonnes (1,810 long tons)
- Length: 89.12 m (292 ft 5 in)
- Beam: 13.28 m (43 ft 7 in)
- Draft: 3.4 m (11 ft 2 in)
- Propulsion: 2 MTU 20V 1163 TB 93 diesel engines producing 14.8MW, driving two controllable-pitch propellers.
- Speed: 26 knots (48 km/h; 30 mph)
- Range: 4,000 nmi (7,400 km) at 15 kn (28 km/h; 17 mph)
- Endurance: 7 days; 21 days with tender
- Complement: 65 : 1 commander, 10 officers, 16 chief petty officers, 38 enlisted
- Sensors & processing systems: Cassidian TRS-3D multifunction Passive electronically scanned array C-Band radar; 2 navigation radars; MSSR 2000 i IFF system; MIRADOR electro-optical sensors; UL 5000 K ESM suite; Link 11 and Link 16 communications
- Electronic warfare & decoys: 2 × TKWA/MASS (Multi Ammunition Softkill System) decoy launcher; UL 5000 K ECM suite
- Armament: Guns; 1 × OTO Melara 76 mm gun; 2 × Mauser BK-27 autocannons; Anti-ship; 4 × RBS-15 Mk.3 anti-ship missiles; Close-In Weapon System: 2 × RAM Block II launchers, 21 missiles each; Mine laying capability; 2 mine racks of 34 naval mines Mk 12
- Aircraft carried: Helicopter pad and hangar for two Saab Skeldar

Emden (F266) is the seventh ship of the Braunschweig-class corvette of the German Navy.

== Developments ==
The Braunschweig class is Germany's newest class of ocean-going corvettes. Five ships have replaced the Gepard-class fast attack craft of the German Navy.

They feature reduced radar and infrared signatures ("stealth" beyond the Sachsen-class frigates) and will be equipped with two helicopter UAVs for remote sensing. Recently, the German Navy ordered a first batch of two UMS Skeldar V-200 systems for the use on the Braunschweig-class corvettes. The hangar is too small for standard helicopters, but the pad is large enough for Sea Kings, Lynx, or NH-90s, the helicopters of the German Navy.

The German Navy has ordered the RBS-15 Mk4 in advance, which will be a future development of the Mk3 with increased range —400 km (250 mi)— and a dual seeker for increased resistance to electronic countermeasures. The RBS-15 Mk3 has the capability to engage land targets.

In October 2016 it was announced that a second batch of five more corvettes is to be procured from 2022 to 2025. The decision was in response to NATO requirements expecting Germany to provide a total of four corvettes at the highest readiness level for littoral operations by 2018, and with only five corvettes just two can be provided.

In September 2017, the German Navy commissioned the construction of five more corvettes in a consortium of North German shipyards. Lürssen will be the main contractor in the production of the vessels. The contract is worth around 2 billion euros. In April 2018, the German government announced the specific arrangements under which the five new K130s would be built.

== Construction and career ==
Emden's construction started in late 2019 and later laid down on 30 January 2020 by Lürssen-Werft in Bremen. Her forecastle was built by Blohm+Voss and towed to Bremen to be assembled. She had been expected to be commissioned in 2025. However, in September 2022 it was reported that increasing difficulties in integrating the command and control systems for the Batch 2 ships had resulted in a cost growth of 401 million Euros and at least a two year delay for the completion of the lead Batch 2 vessel, and potentially cascading delays for the next two ships in the Batch 2 program (including Emden) as well.

On 13 October 2020, she started being towed to Hamburg for assembly with her aft section. She arrived on 17 at Hamburg and on 21 of the same month her assembly started to take place.

In early January 2025, dozens of kilograms of metal shavings were discovered in the gearbox of the ship. The presence of the shavings is suspected as sabotage. The discovery of the shavings occurred during an inspection prior to the ship's maiden voyage. In an Eurojust operation in early 2026 a 54 year old Greek and a 37 year old Romanian citizen were arrested. They are suspected to have sabotaged Emden while they were working at Hamburg harbor in 2025, where the ship was moored before being handed over to the German Navy.
