= German ship Augsburg =

A number of German ships have been named Augsburg for the city of Augsburg:

- German corvette Augsburg of the Braunschweig class.
- German frigate Augsburg (F213) of the Bremen class.
- German frigate Augsburg (F222) of the Köln class.
- SMS Augsburg, a Kolberg-class cruiser of the Imperial German Navy.
- SS Augsburg, a cargo steamship that disappeared at sea in 1912.
