= German corvette Magdeburg =

Braunschweig-class corvette

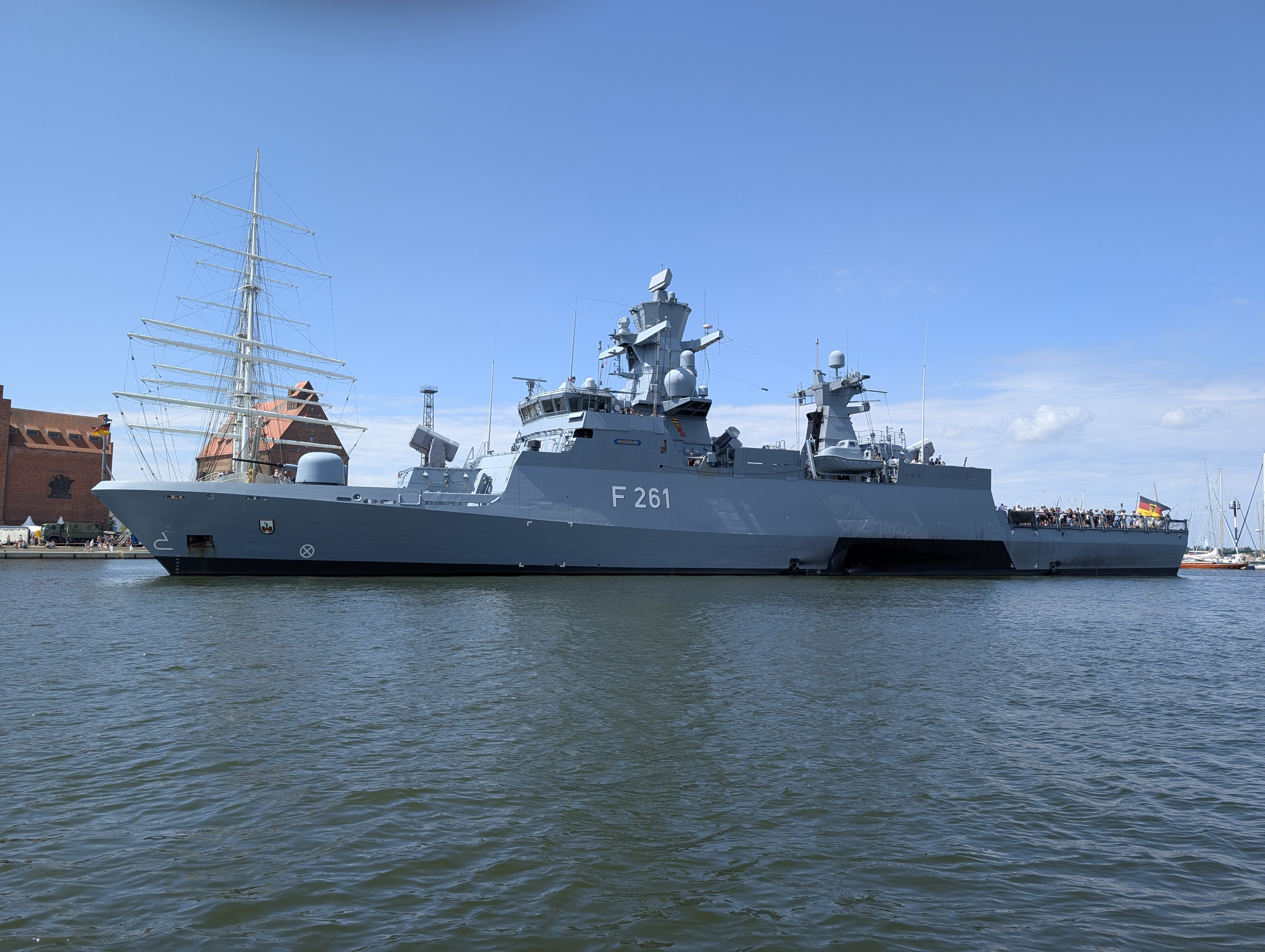
- Magdeburg on 28 June 2025 in Stralsund

History

Germany
- Name: Magdeburg
- Namesake: Magdeburg
- Port of registry: Hamburg, Germany
- Ordered: December 2001
- Builder: Lürssen-Werft, Hamburg
- Cost: €240 million
- Laid down: 19 May 2005
- Launched: 6 September 2006
- Commissioned: 22 September 2008
- Home port: Rostock, Germany
- Identification: MMSI number: 211911000; Callsign: DRBB; Pennant number: F261
- Status: Active

General characteristics
- Type: Braunschweig-class corvette
- Displacement: 1,840 tonnes (1,810 long tons)
- Length: 89.12 m (292 ft 5 in)
- Beam: 13.28 m (43 ft 7 in)
- Draft: 3.4 m (11 ft 2 in)
- Propulsion: 2 MTU 20V 1163 TB 93 diesel engines producing 14.8MW, driving two controllable-pitch propellers.
- Speed: 26 knots (48 km/h; 30 mph)
- Range: 4,000 nmi (7,400 km) at 15 kn (28 km/h; 17 mph)
- Endurance: 7 days; 21 days with tender
- Complement: 65 : 1 commander, 10 officers, 16 chief petty officers, 38 enlisted
- Sensors & processing systems: Cassidian TRS-3D multifunction Passive electronically scanned array C-Band radar; 2 navigation radars; MSSR 2000 i IFF system; MIRADOR electro-optical sensors; UL 5000 K ESM suite; Link 11 and Link 16 communications
- Electronic warfare & decoys: 2 × TKWA/MASS (Multi Ammunition Softkill System) decoy launcher; UL 5000 K ECM suite
- Armament: Guns; 1 × OTO Melara 76 mm gun; 2 × Mauser BK-27 autocannons; Anti-ship; 4 × RBS-15 Mk.3 anti-ship missiles; Close-In Weapon System: 2 × RAM Block II launchers, 21 missiles each; Mine laying capability; 2 mine racks of 34 naval mines Mk 12
- Aircraft carried: Helicopter pad and hangar for two Saab Skeldar

Magdeburg (F261) is the second ship of the Braunschweig-class corvette of the German Navy.

== Developments ==
The K130 Braunschweig class (sometimes Korvette 130) is Germany's newest class of ocean-going corvettes. Five ships have replaced the Gepard-class fast attack craft of the German Navy.

They feature reduced radar and infrared signatures ("stealth" beyond the Sachsen-class frigates) and will be equipped with two helicopter UAVs for remote sensing. Recently, the German Navy ordered a first batch of two UMS Skeldar V-200 systems for the use on the Braunschweig-class corvettes. The hangar is too small for standard helicopters, but the pad is large enough for Sea Kings, Lynx, or NH-90s, the helicopters of the German Navy.

The German Navy has ordered the RBS-15 Mk4 in advance, which will be a future development of the Mk3 with increased range —400 km (250 mi)— and a dual seeker for increased resistance to electronic countermeasures. The RBS-15 Mk3 has the capability to engage land targets.

In October 2016 it was announced that a second batch of five more frigates is to be procured from 2022 to 2025. The decision was in response to NATO requirements expecting Germany to provide a total of four corvettes at the highest readiness level for littoral operations by 2018, and with only five corvettes just two can be provided.

== Construction and career ==
Magdeburg was laid down on 19 May 2005 and launched on 6 September 2006 in Hamburg. She was commissioned on 22 September 2008.

7 May 2018,Magdeburg and KRI Usman Harun conducted a towing exercise in the Mediterranean Sea. Usman Harun act as the disabled ship while Magdeburg will be towing her. Magdeburg conducted a UAV Saab Skeldar V-200 trial on her flight deck on 24 August 2018.

== Gallery ==
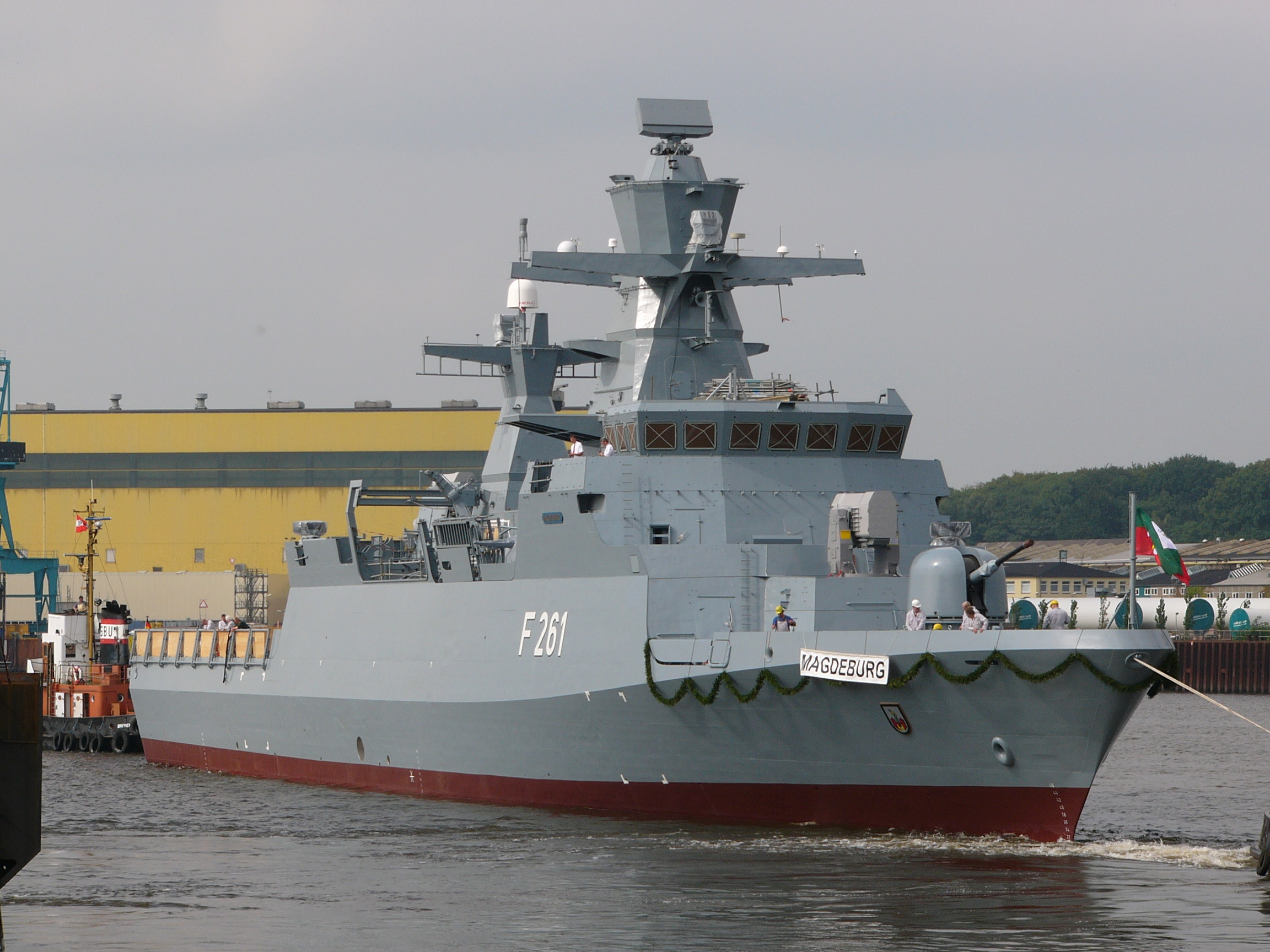
Magdeburg being towed by tugs on 6 September 2006.

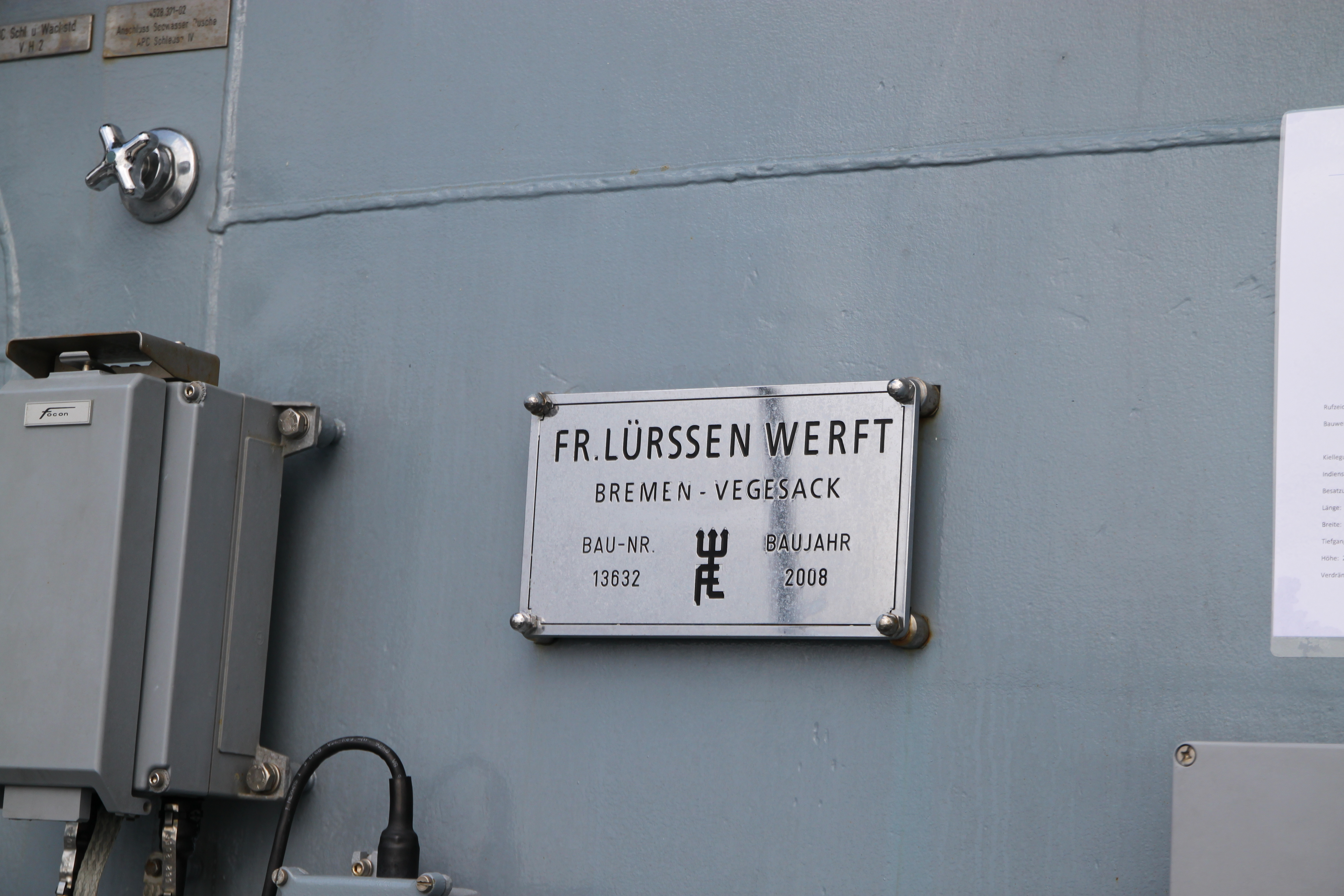
Magdeburg's builders plaque.

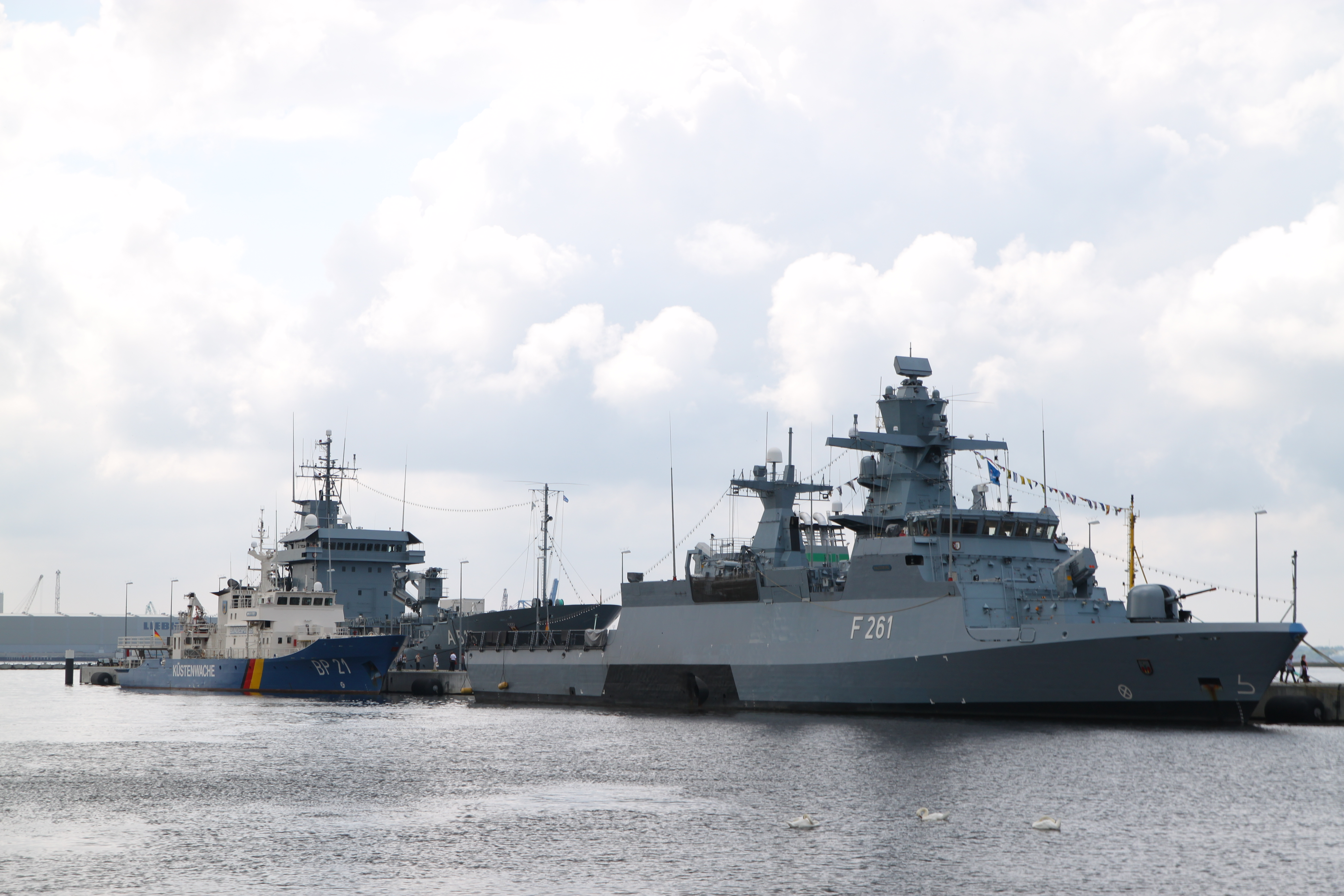
Magdeburg moored on 13 August 2011.

== Bibliography ==
- Warship International Staff (2007). "First of the German K 130 Class". Warship International. XLIV (4): 364–365. ISSN 0043-0374.
