= German ship Oldenburg =

Several naval ships of Germany were named Oldenburg after the city of Oldenburg, Germany:

- SMS Oldenburg (1884): 5,250-ton unique coastal armored ship
- SMS Oldenburg (1910): 23,000-ton Helgoland-class battleship
- Oldenburg (F263): Braunschweig-class (Type 130) corvette, commissioned 2013

== See also ==
- MS Oldenburg
