= German ship Magdeburg =

Several naval ships of Germany were named Magdeburg after the city of Magdeburg, Germany:

- SMS Magdeburg, a Magdeburg-class light cruiser, launched 1911
- SMS Magdeburg (1917) a Cöln-class cruiser, launched 1917, but not completed
- German corvette Magdeburg (F261): Braunschweig-class (Type 130) corvette, launched 2006
