= German ship Lübeck =

A number of German vessels have been named Lübeck for the city of Lübeck:

- German ship Lübeck (1841), an armed steamer of the Reichsflotte
- SMS Lübeck, a Bremen-class cruiser of the Imperial German Navy.
- German frigate Lübeck (F224) of the Köln class.
- German frigate Lübeck (F214) of the Bremen class.
- German corvette Lübeck (F269) of the Braunschweig class.
