= Class 143 =

Class 143 may refer to:

- Albatros-class fast attack craft, also known as Type 143
- British Rail Class 143
- DR Class 243, also known as Class 143
