= Albatros-class fast attack craft =

Military ship in Tunisia and Ghana

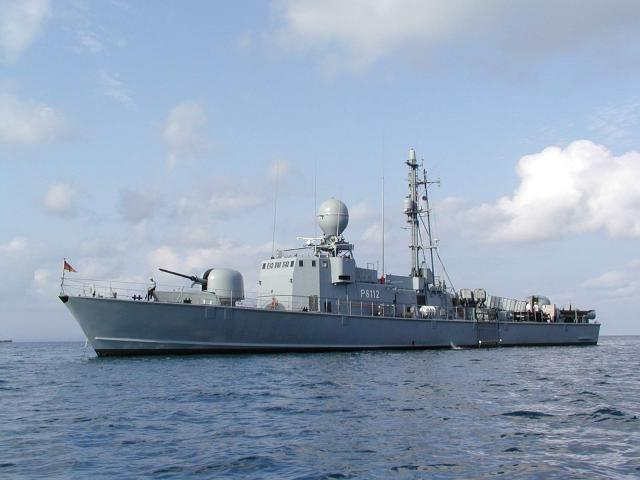
- Falke in May 2002

Class overview
- Name: Type 143 Albatros class
- Builders: Lürssen Werft; Kröger
- Operators: German Navy; Ghana Navy; Tunisian National Navy
- Preceded by: Tiger class
- Succeeded by: Gepard class
- In commission: 1976–2005
- Completed: 10
- Retired: 10

General characteristics
- Type: Fast attack craft
- Displacement: 398 long tons (404 t)
- Length: 57.80 m (189 ft 8 in)
- Beam: 7.80 m (25 ft 7 in)
- Draught: 2.60 m (8 ft 6 in)
- Propulsion: 4 shafts, 4 MTU 16V 956 TB91 diesels 17,700 hp (13,200 kW)
- Speed: 40 knots (74 km/h; 46 mph)
- Range: 1,300 nmi (2,400 km; 1,500 mi) at 30 knots (56 km/h; 35 mph)
- Complement: 40
- Sensors & processing systems: 1 × SMA 3 RM 20 navigation radar; 1 × WM27 search and fire-control radar
- Electronic warfare & decoys: Decoy launcher HOT DOG; Chaff launcher DAG 2200 Wolke
- Armament: 2 × OTO-Melara 76 mm guns; 4 × MM38 Exocet anti-ship missiles; 2 × 533 mm (21 in) torpedo tubes (not used)

The Type 143 Albatros class was a class of missile bearing fast attack craft. Each vessel is named after a bird of prey including the albatross, condor and cormorant. Constructed by German shipbuilders Lürssen and Kröger, the vessels were intended to replace the Type 141 Seeadler class. The German Navy retired the class in 2005 and sold the boats off to Tunisia and Ghana.

== Design ==
=== General characteristics ===
The requirements for the design were finalized in October 1966 and the order placed in July 1972. The Type 143s were constructed of composite hulls, designed by Lürssen, displacing 398 tonnes. They were 57.80 metres (189 ft 8 in) long with a beam of 7.80 m (25 ft 7 in) and a draught of 2.60 m (8 ft 6 in). They had a complement of 40.

The craft were powered by four MTU 16V 956 TB91 diesels creating 17,700 horsepower (13.2 MW) driving four shafts. This gave the craft a maximum speed of 40 knots (74 km/h; 46 mph) and a range of 1,300 nautical miles (2,400 km; 1,500 mi) at 30 knots (56 km/h; 35 mph).

=== Armament and electronics ===
The class was armed with two OTO-Melara 76 mm guns for anti-ship and anti-air warfare. They were placed in single mounts fore and aft. The vessels were also armed with four MM38 Exocet anti-ship missiles situated in two dual mounts aft but forward of the rear 76 mm gun. The class was also equipped with two 533 mm (21 in) torpedo tubes that fired Seal wire-guided torpedoes. The tubes were aft-launching.

The class is equipped with SMA 3 RM 20 navigational radar and WM27 surface search and fire-control radar. For countermeasures, they are provided with a Buck-Wegmann Hot Dog decoy launcher and a DAG 2200 Wolke chaff launcher.

== List of ships ==
NATO pennant number	German pennant number	Name	Call sign	Com- missioned	Decom- missioned	Status
P6111	S61	Albatros	DRBU	1 November 1976	24 March 2005	Sold to Ghana, Naa Gbewaa
P6112	S62	Falke	DRBV	13 April 1976	16 December 2004	
P6113	S63	Geier	DRBW	2 July 1976	29 September 2005	Sold to Tunisia, 507 Himilcon
P6114	S64	Bussard	DRBX	14 August 1976	24 March 2005	Sold to Ghana, Yaa Asantewa
P6115	S65	Sperber	DRBY	27 September 1976	4 July 2005	Sold to Tunisia, 505 Hamilcar
P6116	S66	Greif	DRBZ	25 November 1976	4 July 2005	Sold to Tunisia, 506 Hannon
P6117	S67	Kondor	DRCA	17 December 1976	16 December 2004	
P6118	S68	Seeadler	DRCB	28 March 1977	29 September 2005	Sold to Tunisia 508 Hannibal
P6119	S69	Habicht	DRCC	23 December 1977	13 December 2005	Sold to Tunisia, 509 Hasdrubal
P6120	S70	Kormoran	DRCD	18 July 1977	13 December 2005	Sold to Tunisia, 510 Giscon

== Service history ==
S61—S65 were part of the 2. Schnellboot Geschwader (Fast attack craft squadron), and S66—S70 belonged to the 7. Schnellbootgeschwader. Both squadrons were based in Warnemünde.

== Export ==
Tunisia acquired six boats from Germany in 2005. The six craft had their Exocet missile launchers removed before transfer but retained their guns and torpedo launchers. In July 2010, it was reported that Ghana had purchased two vessels from Germany for €28 million.
