= CybAero =

Swedish helicopter manufacturer

CybAero AB
- Type: Public
- Traded as: First North:CBA
- Industry: Aerospace and Defence
- Founded: 2003
- Headquarters: Linköping, Sweden
- Area served: Worldwide
- Key people: Rolf Schytt (CEO); Claes Drougge (Chairman)
- Products: Remotely piloted aircraft systems (RPAS)
- Revenue: ▲55.591 million SEK (2014)
- Operating income: ▼ -34.202 million SEK (2014)
- Net income: ▼ -34.202 million SEK (2014)
- Number of employees: 55 (2015)
- Website: cybaero.se

CybAero was an aerospace company industry based in Sweden. CybAero developed and manufactured remotely piloted helicopters. The company was publicly traded on First North on the Stockholm Stock Exchange.

In June 2018, the firm filed for bankruptcy.

== History ==
The company was founded in 2003, based on research initiated in 1992 by FOA (later FOI) and Linköping University. The company developed, manufactured and sold unmanned aerial vehicles systems consisting of helicopters, ground stations, sensors and data links.

CybAero was headquartered at Mjärdevi Science Park in the Nordic region's leading aeronautics town, Linköping. Research and development was conducted in part with other companies and research institutions. CybAero at one point had approximately 55 employees and was listed on the NASDAQ OMX First North since 2007.

On January 8, 2008, the APID 55 unmanned helicopter performed the first flight of a UAV in Stockholm.

In February, 2008 the first flight with the NRL Cybaero joint venture UAV called Vantage was performed near Washington DC.

In October, 2009 CybAero signed a teaming agreement with Spanish defense and security group Indra Sistemas. A teaming agreement is an interim agreement between partners which commits them to their roles during the development and marketing stage of a project. It would generally be transformed into a formal sub-contracting agreement once an order for delivery has been placed.

In June 2018, the firm filed for bankruptcy.

== Products ==
The company made remotely piloted aircraft systems (RPAS). The main products were:

- APID One
