= Braunschweig-class corvette =

Stealth warship class of the German Navy

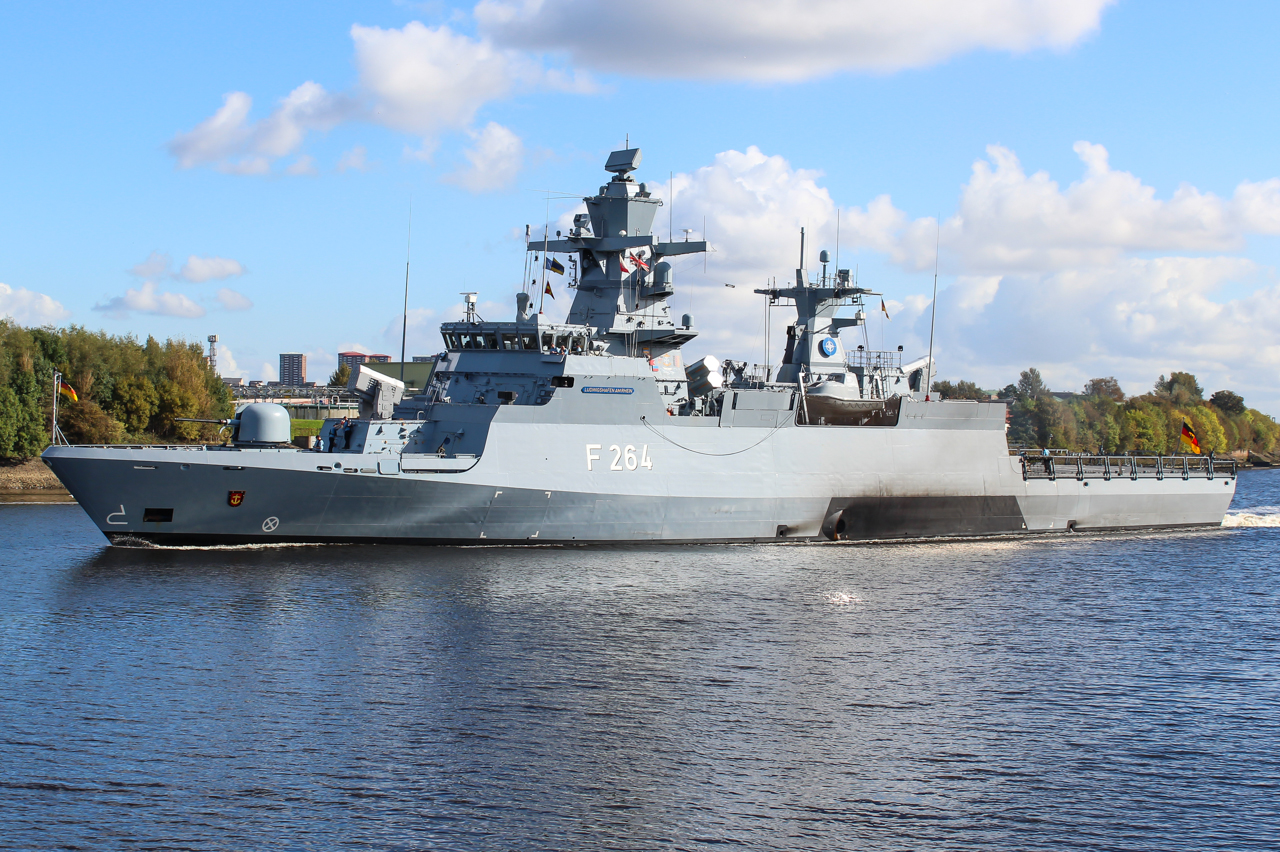
- Ludwigshafen am Rhein in 2016

Class overview
- Builders: Blohm and Voss; Lürssen Werft; Nordseewerke Emden; German Naval Yards Kiel
- Operators: German Navy; Israeli Navy
- Preceded by: Gepard class
- Subclasses: Sa'ar 6 class
- Cost: €240 million (2001) (equivalent to €166.5 million in 2021) per ship (Batch 1); €400 million (2017) (equivalent to €427.84 million in 2021) per ship (Batch 2)
- Built: 2004–present
- In commission: 2008–present
- Planned: 10
- Building: 4
- Completed: 6
- Active: 6

General characteristics
- Type: Corvette
- Displacement: 1,840 t (1,810 long tons)
- Length: 89.12 m (292 ft 5 in)
- Beam: 13.28 m (43 ft 7 in)
- Draft: 3.4 m (11 ft 2 in)
- Installed power: Electric generator: 4 × MTU 12V 1600 DS550 (4 × 550 kW (740 hp))
- Propulsion: 2 × MTU 20V 1163 TB 93 (2 × 7.4 MW (9,900 hp) diesel engines), each driving a controllable-pitch propeller; 1 × bow thruster; Machinery control: CAE IMCS
- Speed: 26 knots (48 km/h; 30 mph)
- Range: 4,000 nmi (7,400 km; 4,600 mi) at 15 kn (28 km/h; 17 mph)
- Endurance: 7 days; 21 days with tender
- Complement: 65 : 1 commander, 10 officers, 16 chief petty officers, 38 enlisted
- Sensors & processing systems: Cassidian TRS-3D (Batch 1) Passive electronically scanned array Hensoldt TRS-4D (Batch 2) multifunction NATO C-band AESA radar; 2 navigation radars; MSSR 2000 i IFF system; MIRADOR electro-optical sensors; UL 5000 K ESM suite; Link 11 and Link 16 communications
- Electronic warfare & decoys: 2 × TKWA/MASS (Multi Ammunition Softkill System) decoy launcher; UL 5000 K ECM suite
- Armament: Guns: 1 × OTO Melara 76 mm gun; 2 × Mauser BK-27 autocannons; Anti-ship: 4 × RBS-15 Mk.3 anti-ship missiles; Close-in weapon system: 2 × RAM Block II launchers, 21 missiles each; Mine laying capability; 2 mine racks of 34 naval mines Mk 12
- Aircraft carried: Helicopter pad and hangar for two drones

The K130 Braunschweig class (sometimes Korvette 130) is Germany's newest class of ocean-going corvettes. Five ships have replaced the Gepard-class fast attack craft of the German Navy.

In October 2016 it was announced that a second batch of five more corvettes, originally to be procured from 2022–2025 but now reportedly delayed. The decision was in response to NATO requirements expecting Germany to provide a total of four corvettes at the highest readiness level for littoral operations by 2018, and with only five corvettes just two can be provided.

== Technical details ==
They feature reduced radar and infrared signatures ("stealth" beyond the capabilities of those of the Sachsen-class frigates), and will be equipped with two helicopter UAVs for remote scouting. The German Navy ordered a first batch of two UMS Skeldar V-200 systems for use on the Braunschweig-class corvettes, but the project was cancelled because the drones did not meet the required milestones. The hangar is too small for standard helicopters, but the pad is large enough for Sea Kings, Lynx, or NH-90s, the helicopters of the German Navy.

Originally, the K130 class was supposed to be armed with the naval version of the Polyphem missile, an optical fiber-guided missile with a range of 60 km (37 mi), which at the time was under development. The Polyphem program was cancelled in 2003 and instead the designers chose to equip the class with the RBS-15. While the RBS-15 has a much greater range of 250 km (160 mi), the current version mounted on the ships, Mk3, lacks the ECM-resistant video feedback of the Polyphem. The German Navy had ordered the RBS-15 Mk4 in advance, which is a development of the Mk3 with increased range —400 km (250 mi)— and a dual seeker for increased resistance to electronic countermeasures. The RBS-15 Mk3 has the capability to engage land targets.

=== Difficulty of classification ===
Vessels of this class do not have an executive officer (German: Erster Offizier). Traditionally, in the German Navy, this was used as a rule to classify a vessel as a boat, not a ship. In a press release, the German Navy stated that these corvettes will be called ships nonetheless because of their size, armament, and endurance. The commanding officer wields the same disciplinary power as a German Army company commander, not that of a battalion commander as is the case with the larger German warships such as frigates. However, in size, armament, protection, and role, these corvettes resemble modern antisurface warfare light frigates, the main difference being the total absence of any antisubmarine warfare related sensors or weapons.

== Contracting ==
The contract for first five ships was awarded in December 2001 Blohm+Voss, at that time owned by ThyssenKrupp Marine Systems, Nordseewerke, and Friedrich Lurssen Werft. The first ship, the Braunschweig, built at Blohm+Voss, was launched in April 2006 and was commissioned in April 2008. The second ship was commissioned in 2008. The final three ships in Batch I were commissioned in 2013. Severe problems with the gearing provided by MAAG GmbH of Winterthur, Switzerland, delayed the commissioning of the corvettes. Further issues occurred with the air-conditioning system and exposure to toxins from exhaust and missile systems.

In May 2015, the Israeli government ordered four Sa'ar 6-class corvettes, whose design by ThyssenKrupp Marine Systems will be loosely based on that of the Braunschweig-class corvette, but with engineering changes to render the baseline platform more militarily robust.

In April 2017, the German government announced a contract for a further five ships to the same group as before, but the process under which it had been awarded was challenged at the German Federal Cartel Office by the German Naval Yards and the contract was voided in May.

In September 2017, the German Navy commissioned the construction of five more corvettes in a consortium of North German shipyards. Lürssen will be the main contractor in the production of the vessels. The contract is worth around 2 billion euros. In April 2018, the German government announced the specific arrangements under which the five new K130s would be built.

Plans to build a third batch (i.e. ships 11–15) are under consideration, ships from the first batch (i.e. ships 1–5) would be decommissioned from 2025 and sold to a NATO ally in order to avoid modernization costs.

In September 2022 it was reported that increasing difficulties in integrating the command and control systems for the Batch 2 ships had resulted in a cost growth of 401 million Euros and at least a two year delay for the completion of the lead Batch 2 vessel, and potentially cascading delays for the next two ships in the Batch 2 program as well.

== Sabotage ==
In February 2025, German media reported an incident aboard Emden. During a routine maintenance check on the yet to complete corvette, significant amounts of metal shavings were found in the main gear. If the engine had been started, these objects would have caused significant damage, further delaying the programme. The Hamburg State Criminal Police Office and the German Military Counterintelligence Service BAMAD are conducting an investigation, suspecting sabotage.

== Ships in class ==
The ships were not built at a single shipyard; sections were constructed at different locations at the same time and later married together. The table lists the yard where the keel-laying ceremonies were held. Due to the decommissioning of the Gepard class, five additionally being constructed from 2019–2025.

Pennant no.	Name	Builder (final assembly shipyard)	Contract	Status	Laid down	Launched	Comm.	Notes
Batch 1 (5 ships)
F260	Braunschweig	Blohm+Voss (shipyard Hamburg)	Dec 2001	In service	3 Dec 2004	19 Apr 2006	16 Apr 2008	
F261	Magdeburg	Lürssen-Werft (shipyard Bremen)	Dec 2001	In service	19 May 2005	6 Sep 2006	22 Sep 2008	
F262	Erfurt	Nordseewerke (shipyard Emden)	Dec 2001	In service	22 Sep 2005	29 Mar 2007	28 Feb 2013	
F263	Oldenburg	Blohm+Voss (shipyard Hamburg)	Dec 2001	In service	16 Jan 2006	28 Jun 2007	21 Jan 2013	
F264	Ludwigshafen am Rhein	Lürssen-Werft (shipyard Bremen)	Dec 2001	In service	14 Apr 2006	26 Sep 2007	21 Mar 2013	
Batch 2 (5 ships)
F265	Köln	Blohm+Voss (NVL Group) (shipyard Hamburg)	12 Sep 2017	Sea trial (constructor)	25 Apr 2019	30 Oct 2020	–	–
F266	Emden	Peene-Werft (Lürssen group) (shipyard Wolgast)	12 Sep 2017	Sea trial (constructor)	30 Jan 2020	4 May 2023	–	
F267	Karlsruhe	Blohm+Voss (NVL Group) (shipyard Hamburg)	12 Sep 2017	Sea trial (German Navy)	6 Oct 2020	4 May 2024	–	–
F268	Augsburg	Lürssen-Werft (shipyard Bremen)	12 Sep 2017	Under construction	13 Jul 2021	8 May 2025	–	–
F269	Lübeck	Blohm+Voss (Rheinmetall group) (shipyard Hamburg)	12 Sep 2017	Under construction	15 Mar 2022	30 Apr 2026	–	–

== Images ==
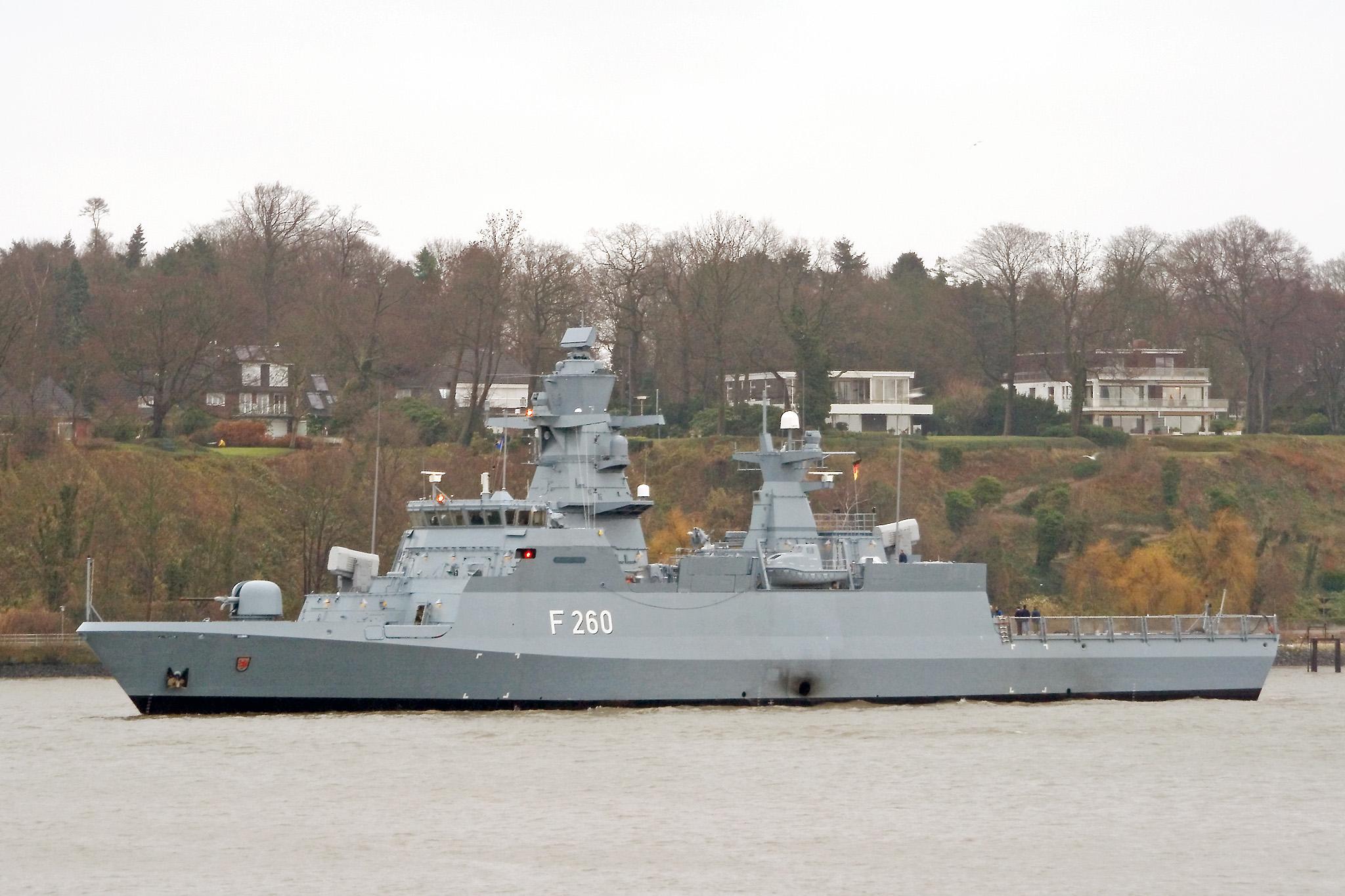
Braunschweig

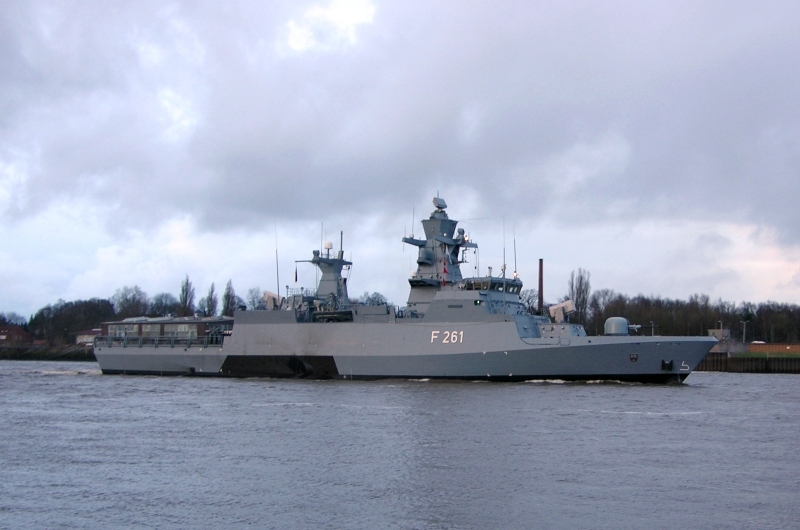
Magdeburg

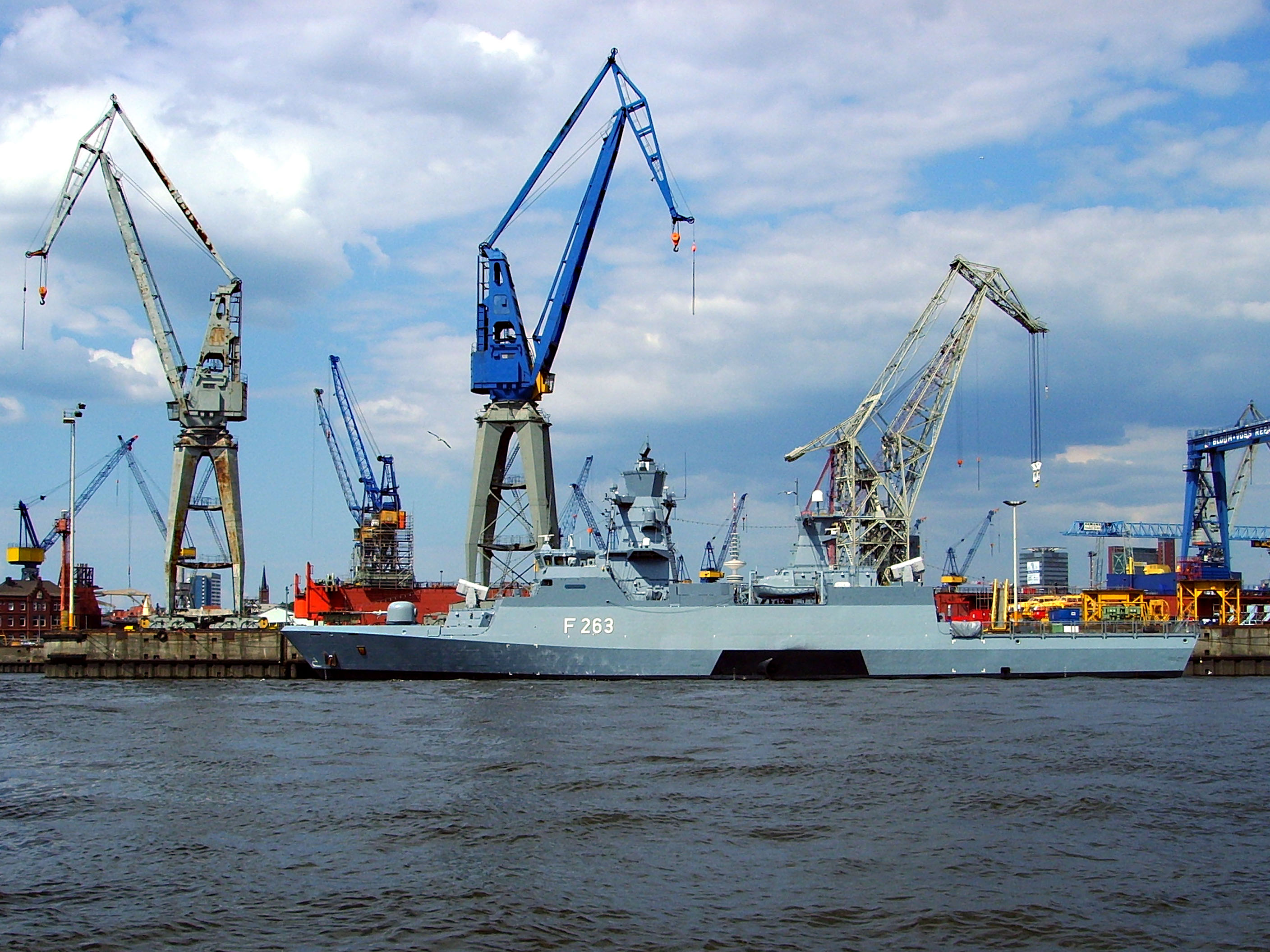
Oldenburg

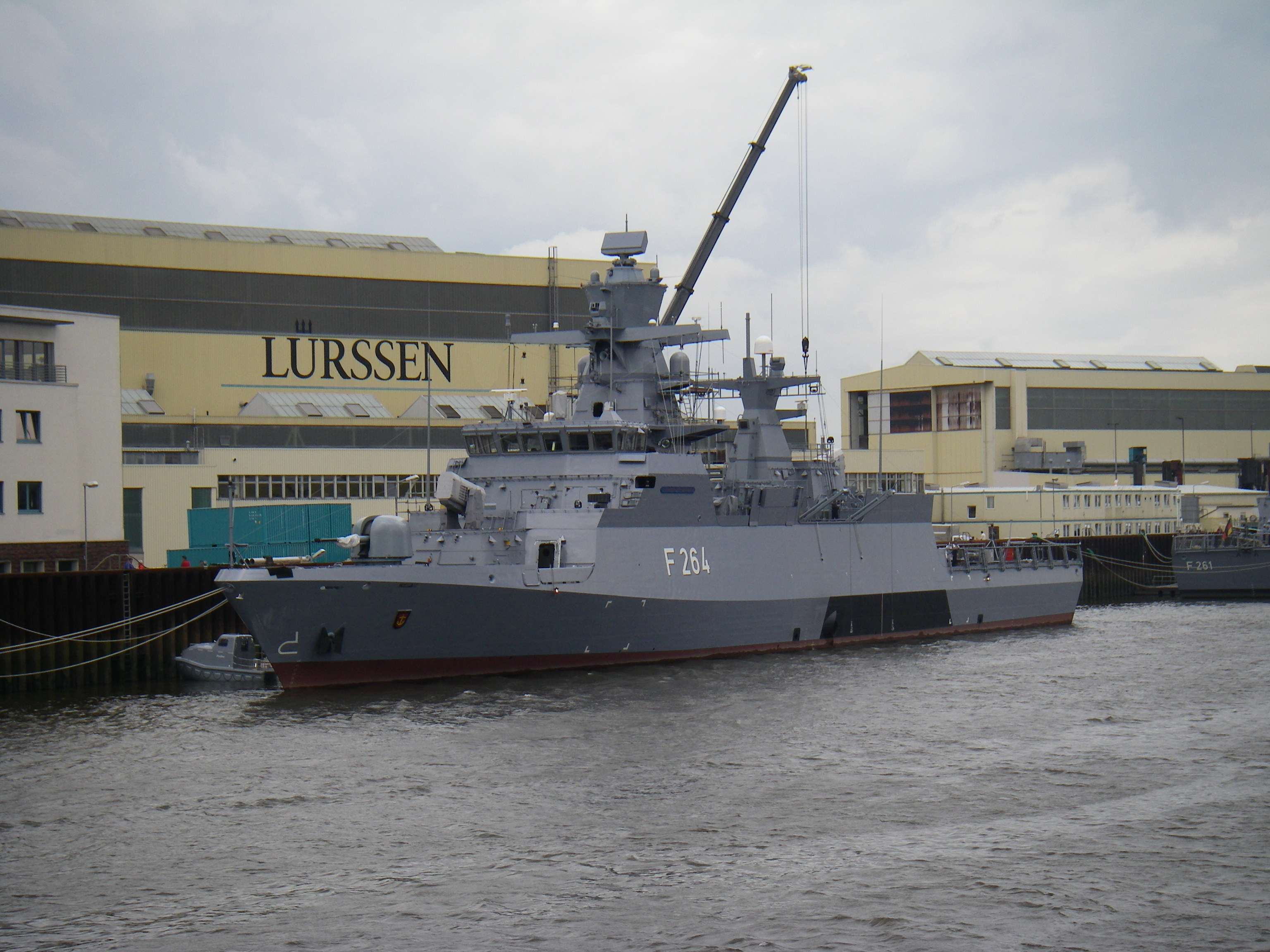
Ludwigshafen am Rhein

== See also ==
- List of corvette classes in service

Equivalent modern corvettes

- Diponegoro-class – (Netherlands)
- Steregushchiy-class – (Russia)
- Kamorta-class – (India)
- Ada-class – (Turkey)
- Sa'ar 6-class – (Israel)
- Pohjanmaa-class – (Finland)

== Bibliography ==
- Warship International Staff (2007). "First of the German K 130 Class". Warship International. XLIV (4): 364–365. ISSN 0043-0374.
