= UMS Skeldar V-200 =

Medium-range Vertical Take Off and Landing Unmanned Aerial Vehicle

Skeldar V-200
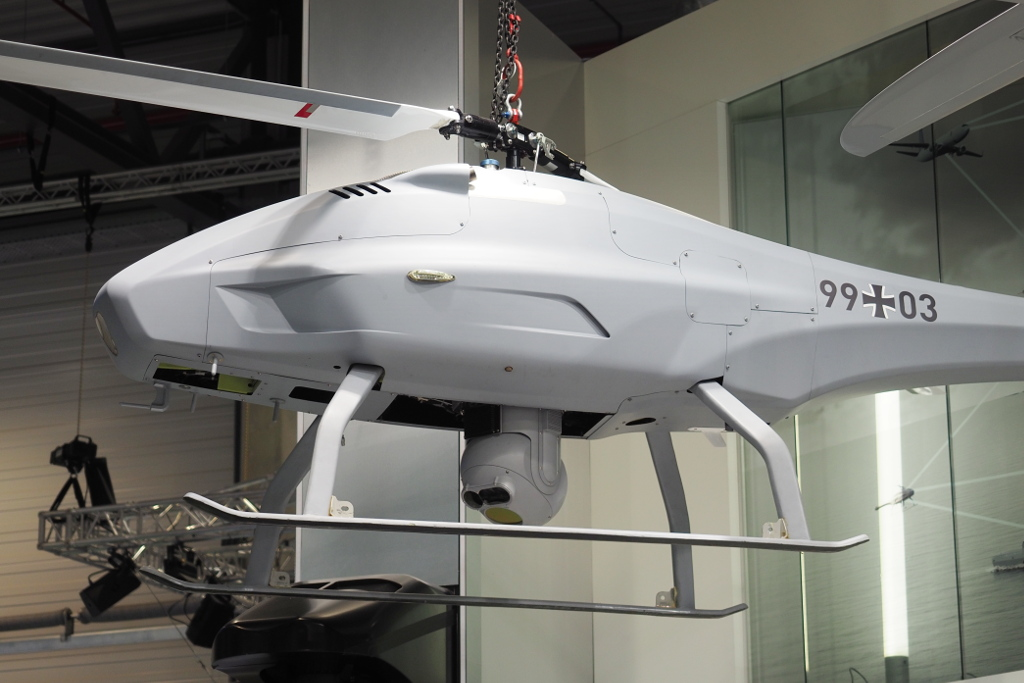
- V-200

General information
- Type: UAV helicopter
- Manufacturer: UMS Skeldar

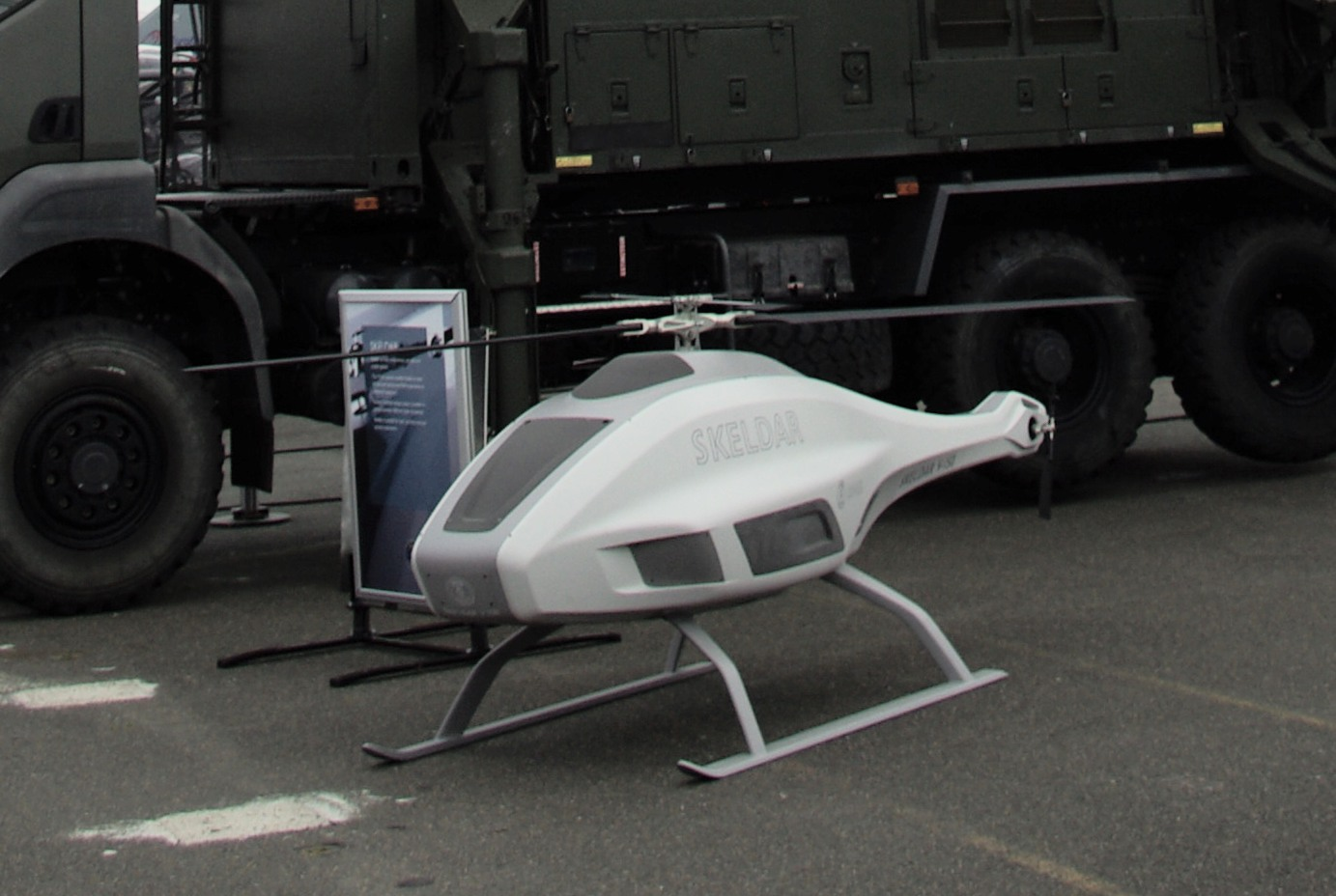
V-150

The UMS Skeldar V-200 is a medium-range helicopter and UAV (Unmanned aerial vehicle) developed by the Swedish aerospace company Saab. The Skeldar can be used for surveillance, intelligence gathering, light cargo transportation, and electronic warfare.

== Development ==
The Skeldar is a derivative of CybAero’s APID 55 UAV system, and its development started in 2005. In June 2006 the Skeldar V-150 was unveiled at the Eurosatory exhibition in Paris, France. The Skeldar V-200 is the designation for the developed version of the system.

== Design ==
The Skeldar V-200 can take-off and land on an area of 15×15 meters. Take-off and landings can be made autonomously.

Skeldar V-200 is modular in the sense that payloads can be changed depending on the mission characteristics, for example it can be equipped with laser pointers, range finders, electro-optical & infrared (EO/IR) 3D mapping, a light cargo hook and SIGINT (Signals Intelligence).

The Skeldar V-200 can be operated in both land and naval operations, by 2–4 people. A UAS Control Station can be integrated into a ground-vehicle such as an APC or truck.

For naval operations the control station can be integrated into a ship's normal operator consoles and combat management systems.

In 2009 Saab partnered with Swiss UAV to jointly develop and market three VTOL (Vertical Take Off and Landing) designs: the Skeldar V-200 and Swiss UAV's Neo S-300 and Koax X 240. The three systems can be controlled from a Saab common ground control station.

In the end of 2015 Saab partnered with UMS and created the company UMS Skeldar.

In September 2018, UMS Skeldar V-200B was selected by the German Navy for use on board K130 Braunschweig class corvettes. After multiple delays, the project was cancelled in July 2024.

The Royal Netherlands Navy and Belgian Navy will use the V-200 on their future MCMV's (mine countermeasure vessels), of which the first will be operational in 2024.

== Operators ==
Belgium

- Belgian Navy

Canada

- Royal Canadian Navy known as CU-176 Gargoyle in Canadian Service

Germany

- German Navy
  - Marineflieger

Indonesia

- Ministry of Defence

Netherlands

- Royal Netherlands Navy

Spain

- Spanish Navy (on trials)

== Specifications (V-200) ==
Source: Saab Skeldar V-200 Technical specifications

Length: 4.031 m (13.23 ft)
Width: 1.2 m (3 ft 11 in)
Height: 1.3 m (4 ft 3 in)
Main Rotor Diameter: 4.6 m (15 ft)
Max takeoff weight: 245 kg (540 lb)
Max takeoff altitude: 2,400 m (7,900 ft)
Payload: 40 kg (88 lb)

Maximum speed: 140 km/h (87 mph)
Mission radius: 100 km (62 mi)
Endurance: +6 hours
Power rating: 55 hp (41 kW)
Service ceiling: 3,000 m (9,800 ft)
Takeoff preparation time: <15 min
