= Gepard-class fast attack craft =

Class of German attack craft

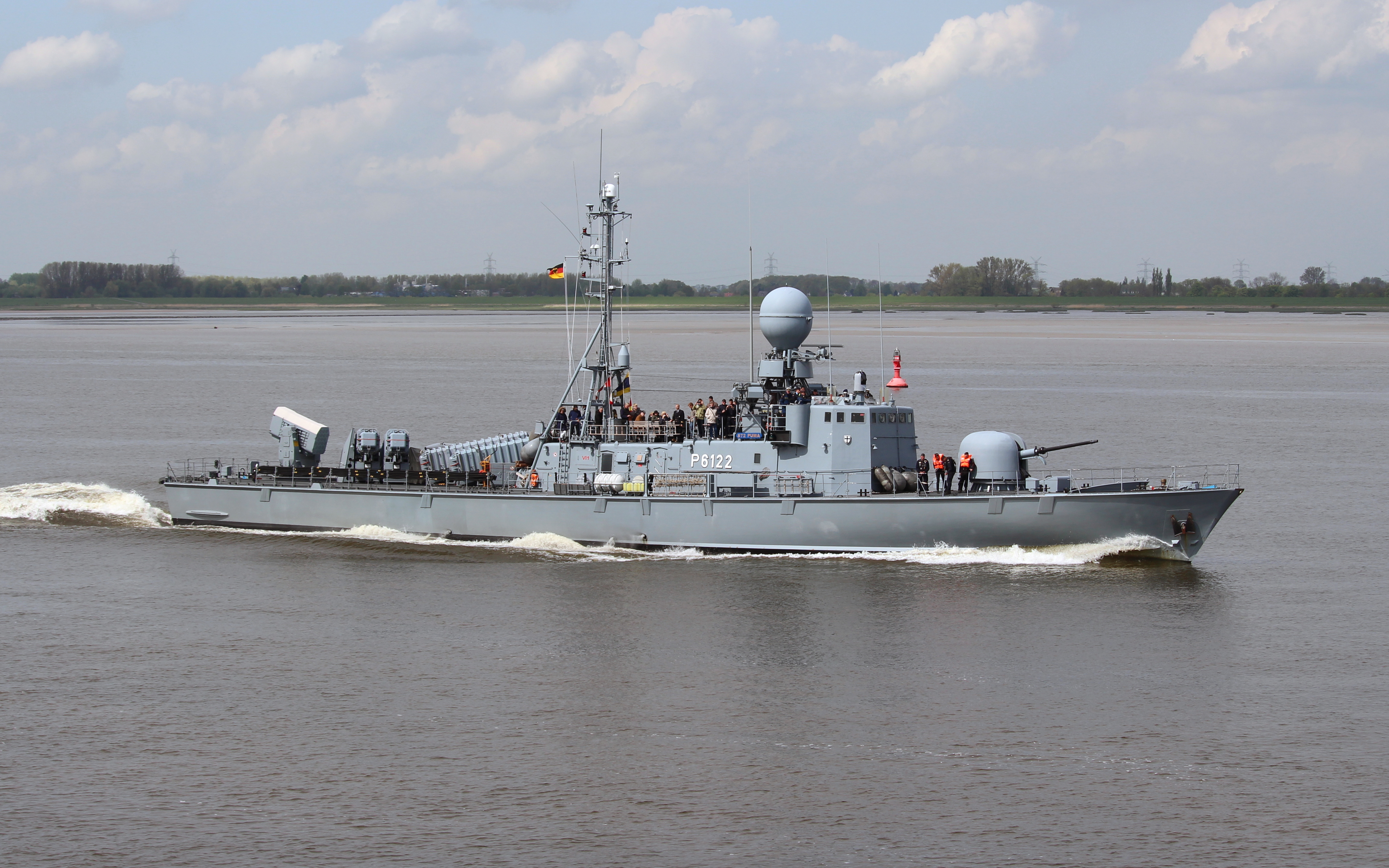
- Puma

Class overview
- Operators: German Navy
- Preceded by: Albatros class
- Succeeded by: Braunschweig-class corvette
- In commission: 1982 - 2016
- Planned: 10
- Completed: 10
- Active: 0
- Retired: 10
- Preserved: 1

General characteristics
- Type: Fast attack craft
- Displacement: 390 t (380 long tons)
- Length: 57.6 m (189 ft)
- Beam: 7.8 m (25 ft 7 in)
- Draught: 2.6 m (8 ft 6 in)
- Propulsion: 4 × diesel engines, totalling 13,235 kW (17,748 hp)
- Speed: 40 knots (74 km/h; 46 mph)
- Complement: 5 officers, 31 enlisted
- Electronic warfare & decoys: Decoy launcher HOT DOG; Chaff launcher DAG 2200 Wolke
- Armament: 1 × Otobreda 76 mm gun; 4 × MM38 Exocet anti-ship missiles; 1 × GDC RAM launcher, 21 cells; 2 × MG50-1 machine guns; Minelaying capability

The Type 143A Gepard class was a class of missile bearing fast attack craft (German: Schnellboot) and the last one in service with the German Navy before the remaining four operational ships were decommissioned on 16 November 2016.

It is an evolution of the Albatros class, the main difference being the replacement of the second 76 mm gun by the RAM system. The Gepard-class vessels were gradually supplemented by Braunschweig-class corvettes and later replaced completely by them.

The ships in class were named after small to medium-sized predatory animals; Gepard is German for "cheetah".

== List of ships ==
NATO pennant number	German pennant number	Name	Call sign	Commissioned	Decommissioned	Status
P6121	S 71	Gepard	DRCE	7 December 1982	12 December 2014	Museum ship in Wilhelmshaven
P6122	S 72	Puma	DRCF	17 February 1983	14 December 2015	
P6123	S 73	Hermelin	DRCG	28 April 1983	16 November 2016	
P6124	S 74	Nerz	DRCH	14 July 1983	31 March 2012	Transferred to Ghana Navy
P6125	S 75	Zobel	DRCI	28 September 1983	16 November 2016	
P6126	S 76	Frettchen	DRCJ	16 December 1983	16 November 2016	
P6127	S 77	Dachs	DRCK	22 March 1984	31 March 2012	Transferred to Ghana Navy
P6128	S 78	Ozelot	DRCL	25 May 1984	18 December 2014	
P6129	S 79	Wiesel	DRCM	12 July 1984	14 December 2015	
P6130	S 80	Hyäne	DRCN	13 November 1984	16 November 2016	

The "S" and the number are part of the ship's full name. When the ships were first commissioned, their designation included only the number; however, the crews petitioned for full names, and the decision was made to combine the original names with the additional animal name.

Since 1 July 2006, all ships had formed part of the 7. Schnellbootgeschwader (7th Fast Patrol Boat Squadron), whereas for the eight years prior the flotilla was split into (hulls S 76–S 80) 2. Schnellbootgeschwader (2nd Fast Patrol Boat Squadron), and (hulls S 71–S 75) 7. Schnellbootgeschwader. The squadron was stationed in Warnemünde, where both predecessor squadrons had been based.

== Gallery ==
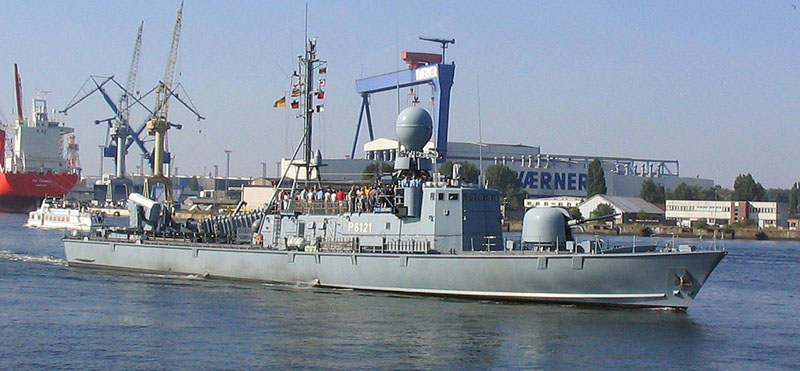
S71 Gepard

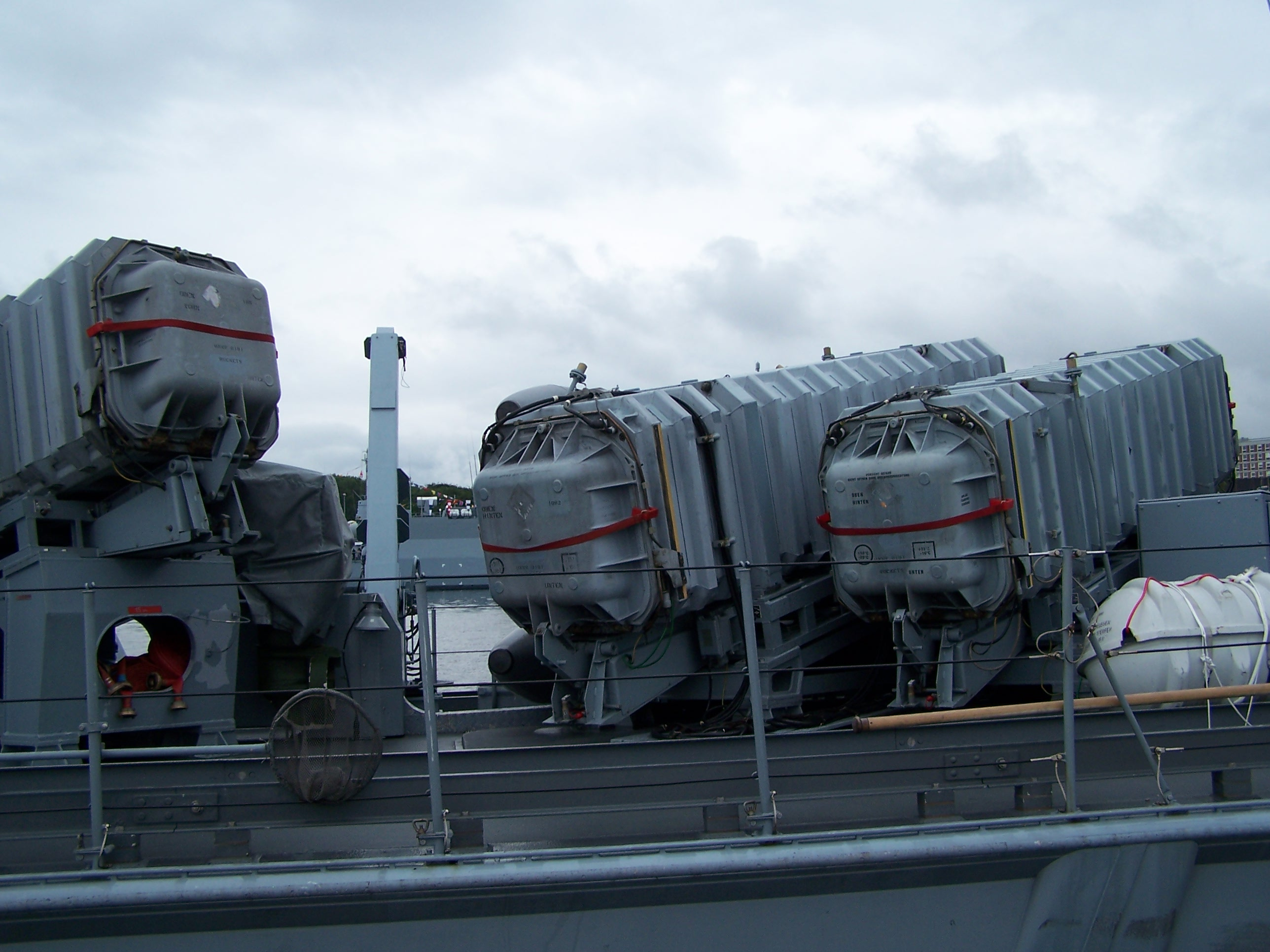
Exocet launchers onboard S74 Nerz

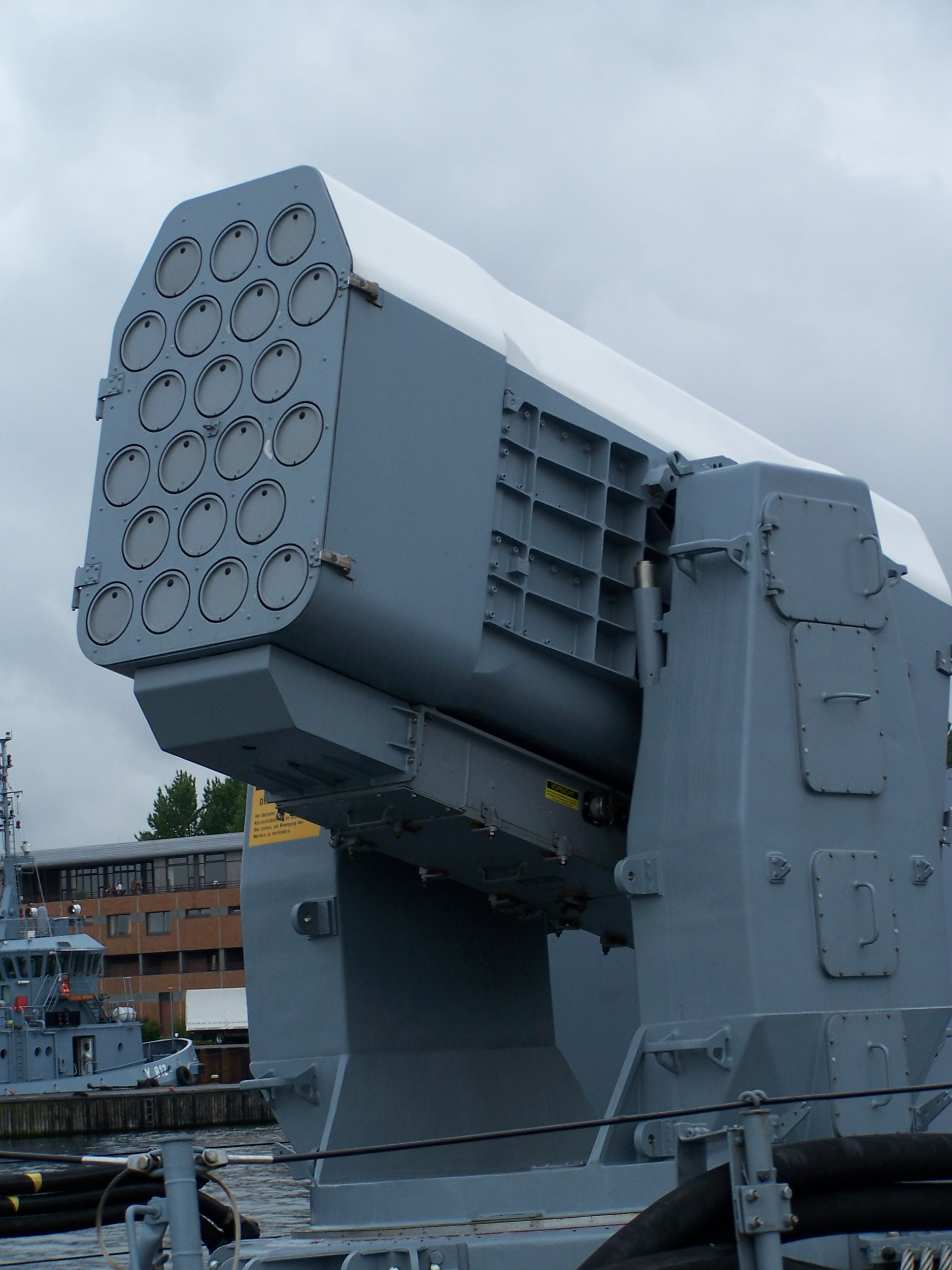
RAM launcher onboard S74 Nerz

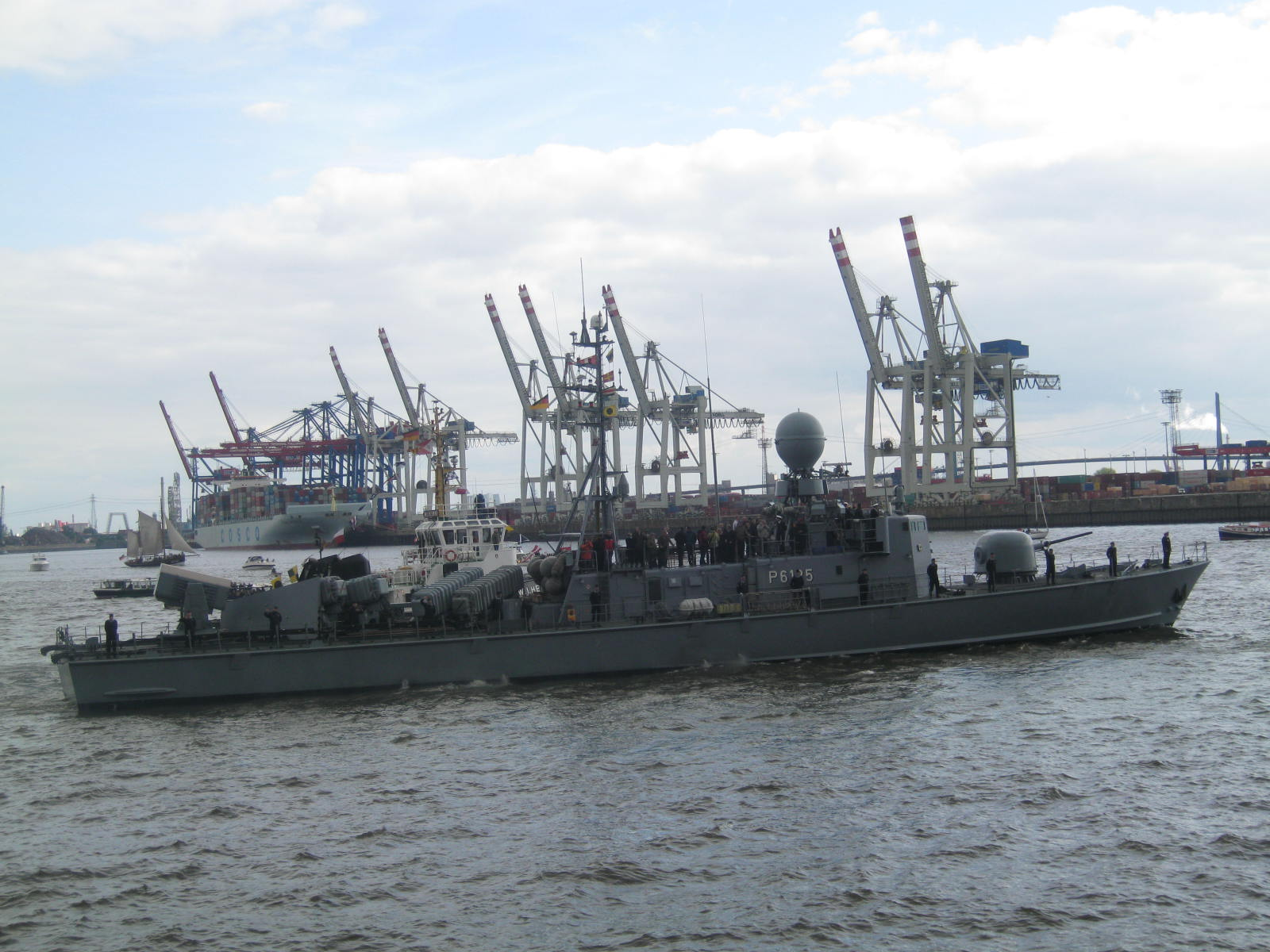
S 75 Zobel
