= Multi Ammunition Softkill System =

Military technology

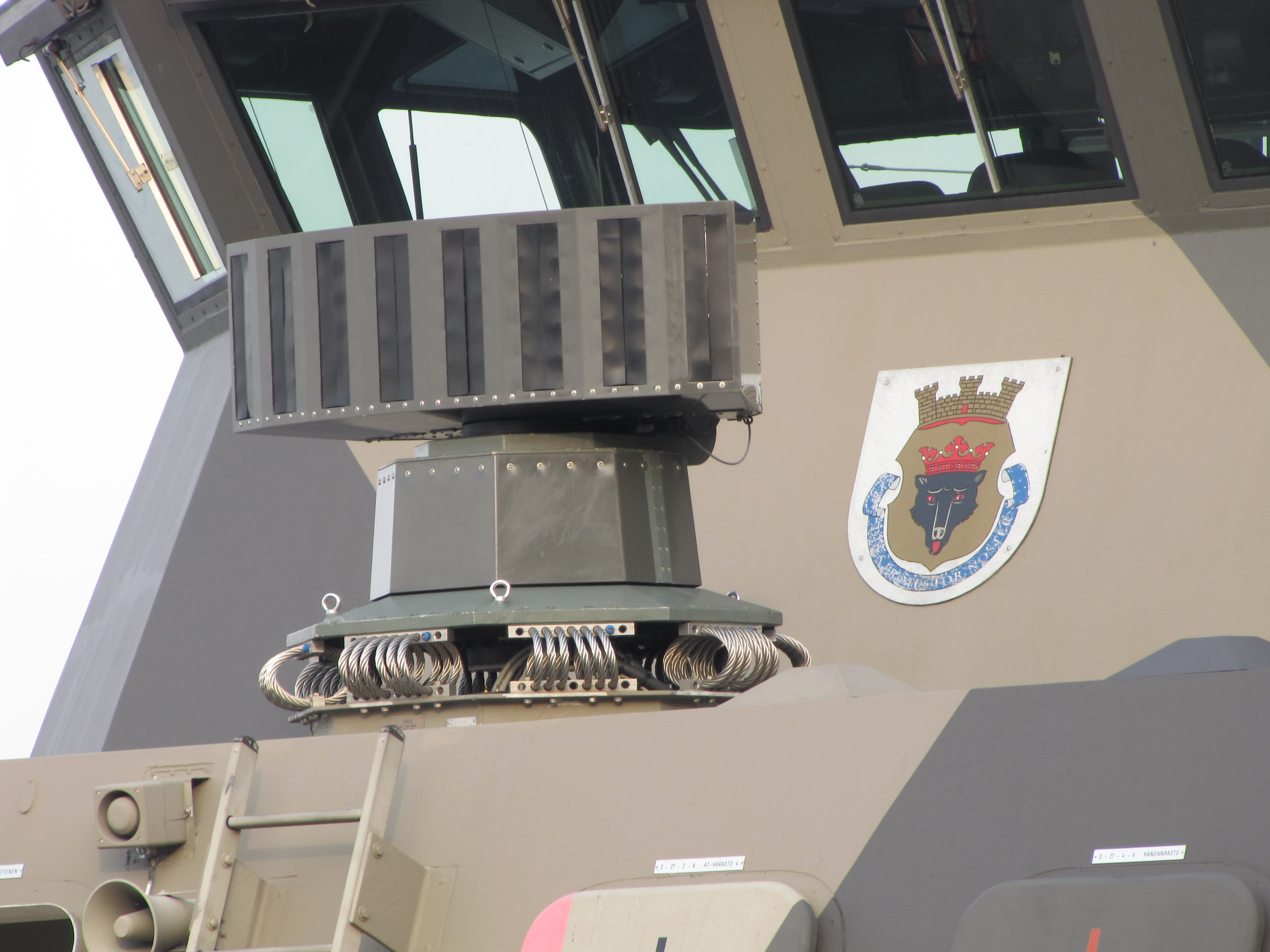
MASS decoy launcher of a Hamina-class missile boat.

Multi Ammunition Softkill System (MASS) is a naval self-defence system produced by Rheinmetall of Germany. It is connected to the ship's sensors and protects ships from attacks by advanced sensor-guided missiles by launching decoys that operate in all relevant wavelengths of the electromagnetic spectrum: ultraviolet, electro-optical, laser, infrared and radar. MASS can either be integrated with the command and control system of a warship, or can operate autonomously.

Rheinmetall Defence stated that "MASS has attracted orders from 9 nations, for 130 launchers, on 15 different classes of naval vessels" as of 31 March 2009. As of 3 March 2011, this has been expanded to a total order of at least 172 units. Roughly one year later, on 17 April 2012, the total was 186 launchers for 22 different classes of vessels in 11 different nations.

== Customers ==
- Germany: Brandenburg-class frigates, Braunschweig-class corvettes, Frankenthal-class minehunters, Kulmbach-class mine hunters, Baden-Württemberg-class frigates and the future F126 frigates
- Australia: Hobart-class destroyers and Anzac-class frigates
- Canada: Halifax-class frigates
- Denmark: Absalon-class frigate and Iver-Huitfeldt-class (after update)
- Finland: Hamina-class missile boats, Hämeenmaa-class minelayers, Rauma-class missile boats, Pohjanmaa-class corvettes
- New Zealand: Anzac-class frigates, as part of the ANZAC modernization programme.
- Norway: Skjold-class corvettes
- Oman: Khareef-class corvettes
- Pakistan: Tariq-class destroyers
- Peru: Lupo-class frigate
- South Korea: LST-II-class landing ships
- Sweden: Göteborg-class corvettes, Stockholm-class corvettes, and Visby-class corvettes
- United Arab Emirates: Baynunah-class corvettes, Abu Dhabi-class corvettes, Falaj 2-class patrol vessels

== Future operators ==
- Bulgaria: The Bulgarian Navy's New Multi-Purpose Corvettes are going to Utilize the MASS system.
