= List of active German Navy ships =

Naval ensign of Germany

This is a list of active German Navy ships as of 2022. There are approximately 65 ships in commission including; 11 frigates, 5 corvettes, 2 minesweepers, 10 minehunters, 6 submarines, 11 replenishment ships, and 20 miscellaneous auxiliary vessels.

== Current fleet ==
=== Submarine fleet ===
Class	In service	Origin	Picture	Type	Builder	Boats	No.	Comm.	Disp.	Notes
Type 212A; U-Boot-Klasse 212 A	6	Germany		Attack submarine	HDW	U-31	S181	2005	1,830 tonnes	Part of 1 Submarine Squadron of Einsatzflottille 1.
Type 212A; U-Boot-Klasse 212 A	6	Germany		Attack submarine	HDW	U-32	S182	2005	1,830 tonnes	Part of 1 Submarine Squadron of Einsatzflottille 1.
Type 212A; U-Boot-Klasse 212 A	6	Germany		Attack submarine	HDW	U-33	S183	2006	1,830 tonnes	Part of 1 Submarine Squadron of Einsatzflottille 1.
Type 212A; U-Boot-Klasse 212 A	6	Germany		Attack submarine	HDW	U-34	S184	2007	1,830 tonnes	Part of 1 Submarine Squadron of Einsatzflottille 1.
Type 212A; U-Boot-Klasse 212 A	6	Germany		Attack submarine	HDW	U-35	S185	2015	1,830 tonnes	Part of 1 Submarine Squadron of Einsatzflottille 1.
Type 212A; U-Boot-Klasse 212 A	6	Germany		Attack submarine	HDW	U-36	S186	2016	1,830 tonnes	Part of 1 Submarine Squadron of Einsatzflottille 1.

=== Surface fleet ===
Class	In service	Origin	Picture	Type	Builder	Ships	No.	Comm.	Disp.	Notes
Frigates (11)
Brandenburg class Type F123	4	Germany		General-purpose frigate	Blohm + Voss; HDW; Nordseewerke; Bremer Vulkan	Brandenburg	F215	1994	4,900 tonnes	Forms 2 Frigate Squadron of Einsatzflottille 2.
Brandenburg class Type F123	4	Germany		General-purpose frigate	Blohm + Voss; HDW; Nordseewerke; Bremer Vulkan	Schleswig-Holstein	F216	1994	4,900 tonnes	Forms 2 Frigate Squadron of Einsatzflottille 2.
Brandenburg class Type F123	4	Germany		General-purpose frigate	Blohm + Voss; HDW; Nordseewerke; Bremer Vulkan	Bayern	F217	1995	4,900 tonnes	Forms 2 Frigate Squadron of Einsatzflottille 2.
Brandenburg class Type F123	4	Germany		General-purpose frigate	Blohm + Voss; HDW; Nordseewerke; Bremer Vulkan	Mecklenburg-Vorpommern	F218	1996	4,900 tonnes	Forms 2 Frigate Squadron of Einsatzflottille 2.
Sachsen class Type F124	3	Germany		Air-defence frigate	Blohm + Voss; HDW; Nordseewerke	Sachsen	F219	2004	5,800 tonnes	Forms 2 Frigate Squadron of Einsatzflottille 2.
Sachsen class Type F124	3	Germany		Air-defence frigate	Blohm + Voss; HDW; Nordseewerke	Hamburg	F220	2004	5,800 tonnes	Forms 2 Frigate Squadron of Einsatzflottille 2.
Sachsen class Type F124	3	Germany		Air-defence frigate	Blohm + Voss; HDW; Nordseewerke	Hessen	F221	2006	5,800 tonnes	Forms 2 Frigate Squadron of Einsatzflottille 2.
Baden-Württemberg class Type F125	4	Germany		Frigate, low intensity operations	TKMS; Blohm + Voss; Lürssen	Baden-Württemberg	F222	2019	7,200 tonnes	Forms 4 Frigate Squadron of Einsatzflottille 2.
Baden-Württemberg class Type F125	4	Germany		Frigate, low intensity operations	TKMS; Blohm + Voss; Lürssen	Nordrhein-Westfalen	F223	2020	7,200 tonnes	Forms 4 Frigate Squadron of Einsatzflottille 2.
Baden-Württemberg class Type F125	4	Germany		Frigate, low intensity operations	TKMS; Blohm + Voss; Lürssen	Sachsen-Anhalt	F224	2021	7,200 tonnes	Forms 4 Frigate Squadron of Einsatzflottille 2.
Baden-Württemberg class Type F125	4	Germany		Frigate, low intensity operations	TKMS; Blohm + Voss; Lürssen	Rheinland-Pfalz	F225	2022	7,200 tonnes	Forms 4 Frigate Squadron of Einsatzflottille 2.
Corvettes (6)
Braunschweig class Type K130 batch 1	5	Germany		General-purpose corvette	Blohm + Voss; Lürssen; Nordseewerke	Braunschweig	F260	2008	1,840 tonnes	Part of 1 Corvette squadron of Einsatzflottille 1.
Braunschweig class Type K130 batch 1	5	Germany		General-purpose corvette	Blohm + Voss; Lürssen; Nordseewerke	Magdeburg	F261	2008	1,840 tonnes	Part of 1 Corvette squadron of Einsatzflottille 1.
Braunschweig class Type K130 batch 1	5	Germany		General-purpose corvette	Blohm + Voss; Lürssen; Nordseewerke	Erfurt	F262	2013	1,840 tonnes	Part of 1 Corvette squadron of Einsatzflottille 1.
Braunschweig class Type K130 batch 1	5	Germany		General-purpose corvette	Blohm + Voss; Lürssen; Nordseewerke	Oldenburg	F263	2013	1,840 tonnes	Part of 1 Corvette squadron of Einsatzflottille 1.
Braunschweig class Type K130 batch 1	5	Germany		General-purpose corvette	Blohm + Voss; Lürssen; Nordseewerke	Ludwigshafen am Rhein	F264	2013	1,840 tonnes	Part of 1 Corvette squadron of Einsatzflottille 1.
Braunschweig class Type K130 batch 2	1 (+4 under construction)	Germany		General-purpose corvette	Blohm + Voss; Lürssen; Nordseewerke	Köln	F265	2025	1,840 tonnes	Part of the 1 Corvette squadron of Einsatzflottille 1.
Mine countermeasure ships (12)
Ensdorf class Type 352	2	Germany		Minesweeper	Lürssen; Abeking & Rasmussen	Pegnitz	M1090	1990	650 tonnes	3 retired (in 2014, 2015). Part of the 3rd Mine Countermeasures Squadron of Einsatzflottille 1.
Ensdorf class Type 352	2	Germany		Minesweeper	Lürssen; Abeking & Rasmussen	Siegburg	M1098	1990	650 tonnes	3 retired (in 2014, 2015). Part of the 3rd Mine Countermeasures Squadron of Einsatzflottille 1.
Frankenthal class Type 332	10	Germany		Minehunter	Lürssen; Abeking & Rasmussen; Krögerwerft	Fulda	M1058	1998	650 tonnes	2 retired. Part of the 3rd Mine Countermeasures Squadron Einsatzflottille 1.
Frankenthal class Type 332	10	Germany		Minehunter	Lürssen; Abeking & Rasmussen; Krögerwerft	Weilheim	M1059	1998	650 tonnes	2 retired. Part of the 3rd Mine Countermeasures Squadron Einsatzflottille 1.
Frankenthal class Type 332	10	Germany		Minehunter	Lürssen; Abeking & Rasmussen; Krögerwerft	Rottweil	M1061	1993	650 tonnes	2 retired. Part of the 3rd Mine Countermeasures Squadron Einsatzflottille 1.
Frankenthal class Type 332	10	Germany		Minehunter	Lürssen; Abeking & Rasmussen; Krögerwerft	Sulzbach-Rosenberg	M1062	1996	650 tonnes	2 retired. Part of the 3rd Mine Countermeasures Squadron Einsatzflottille 1.
Frankenthal class Type 332	10	Germany		Minehunter	Lürssen; Abeking & Rasmussen; Krögerwerft	Bad Bevensen	M1063	1993	650 tonnes	2 retired. Part of the 3rd Mine Countermeasures Squadron Einsatzflottille 1.
Frankenthal class Type 332	10	Germany		Minehunter	Lürssen; Abeking & Rasmussen; Krögerwerft	Grömitz	M1064	1994	650 tonnes	2 retired. Part of the 3rd Mine Countermeasures Squadron Einsatzflottille 1.
Frankenthal class Type 332	10	Germany		Minehunter	Lürssen; Abeking & Rasmussen; Krögerwerft	Dillingen	M1065	1995	650 tonnes	2 retired. Part of the 3rd Mine Countermeasures Squadron Einsatzflottille 1.
Frankenthal class Type 332	10	Germany		Minehunter	Lürssen; Abeking & Rasmussen; Krögerwerft	Bad Rappenau	M1067	1994	650 tonnes	2 retired. Part of the 3rd Mine Countermeasures Squadron Einsatzflottille 1.
Frankenthal class Type 332	10	Germany		Minehunter	Lürssen; Abeking & Rasmussen; Krögerwerft	Datteln	M1068	1994	650 tonnes	2 retired. Part of the 3rd Mine Countermeasures Squadron Einsatzflottille 1.
Frankenthal class Type 332	10	Germany		Minehunter	Lürssen; Abeking & Rasmussen; Krögerwerft	Homburg	M1069	1995	650 tonnes	2 retired. Part of the 3rd Mine Countermeasures Squadron Einsatzflottille 1.
Electronic surveillance (3)
Oste class Type 423	3	Germany		Electronic surveillance	Flensburger Schiffbau-Gesellschaft	Oste	A52	1988	3,200 tonnes	Replacement planned from 2029 to 2031. Three Type 424 ships were ordered in July 2023 for €3.26 billion.
Oste class Type 423	3	Germany		Electronic surveillance	Flensburger Schiffbau-Gesellschaft	Oker	A53	1988	3,200 tonnes	Replacement planned from 2029 to 2031. Three Type 424 ships were ordered in July 2023 for €3.26 billion.
Oste class Type 423	3	Germany		Electronic surveillance	Flensburger Schiffbau-Gesellschaft	Alster	A50	1989	3,200 tonnes	Replacement planned from 2029 to 2031. Three Type 424 ships were ordered in July 2023 for €3.26 billion.
Light boats
Boomeranger Speedboat	–	Finland		Multi-role rigid hull inflatable mission boat	Boomeranger	–	–	–	–	Operated on the Type F123 Brandenburg class and with the Sea Battalion for search and rescue, light patrol, person transfer, mine divers, coastal operations.
Fassmer SFB 10.1; Special Force Boat	16	Germany		Rigid hull inflatable mission boat	Fassmer	–	–	–	–	Used on the Type F125 Baden-Württemberg class
–	10	–		Rigid hull inflatable mission boat	–	–	–	–	–	Used on the Type K130 Braunschweig class.
Zodiac Hurricane H1010	4	France		Special forces rigid hull inflatable boat	Zodiac Milpro	–	–	–	–	Used by the Kommando Spezialkräfte Marine.
11M NSWRIB; Naval Special Warfare Rigid Inflatable Boat	4	United States		Special forces rigid hull inflatable boat	United States Marine Inc.	–	–	–	–	Interim replacement of the Zodiac Hurricane H1010.

=== Auxiliary fleet ===
Class	In service	Origin	Picture	Type	Builder	Ships	No.	Comm.	Disp.	Notes
Replenishment ships (11)
Berlin class Type 702	3	Germany		Replenishment oiler	Flensburger Schiffbau-Gesellschaft; Abeking & Rasmussen; Peene-Werft	Berlin	A1411	2001	20,240 tonnes	
Berlin class Type 702	3	Germany		Replenishment oiler	Flensburger Schiffbau-Gesellschaft; Abeking & Rasmussen; Peene-Werft	Frankfurt am Main	A1412	2002	20,240 tonnes	
Berlin class Type 702	3	Germany		Replenishment oiler	Flensburger Schiffbau-Gesellschaft; Abeking & Rasmussen; Peene-Werft	Bonn	A1413	2013	20,240 tonnes	
Rhön class Type 704	2	Germany		Replenishment oiler	Kröger-Werft	Rhön	A1443	1977	14,169 tonnes	Replacement planned for 2025–2026.
Rhön class Type 704	2	Germany		Replenishment oiler	Kröger-Werft	Spessart	A1442	1977	14,169 tonnes	Replacement planned for 2025–2026.
Elbe class Type 404	6	Germany		Tender	Bremer Vulkan	Elbe	A511	1993	3,586 tonnes	
Elbe class Type 404	6	Germany		Tender	Bremer Vulkan	Mosel	A512	1993	3,586 tonnes	
Elbe class Type 404	6	Germany		Tender	Bremer Vulkan	Rhein	A513	1993	3,586 tonnes	
Elbe class Type 404	6	Germany		Tender	Bremer Vulkan	Werra	A514	1993	3,586 tonnes	
Elbe class Type 404	6	Germany		Tender	Bremer Vulkan	Main	A515	1994	3,586 tonnes	
Elbe class Type 404	6	Germany		Tender	Bremer Vulkan	Donau	A516	1994	3,586 tonnes	
Tugboats (9)
UT722L class	1	Norway	–	Ocean-going tugboat	Vard shipyard	Rügen	A1453	2023	2,760 tonnes	Second-hand, commissioned initially in 2003, commercial tugboat, formerly known was Rota Endurance.
ABS class	1	China	–	Ocean-going tugboat	Guangdong Yuexin Ocean Engineering	Borkum	A1454	1 October 2024	2,888 tonnes	Second-hand, commissioned initially in 2022, commercial tugboat, formerly known was Britoil Guardian.
Nordstrand class Type 725A	6	Germany		Harbour tugboat	Orenstein & Koppel	Nordstrand	Y817	1987	278 tonnes	
Nordstrand class Type 725A	6	Germany		Harbour tugboat	Orenstein & Koppel	Langeness	Y819	1987	278 tonnes	
Nordstrand class Type 725A	6	Germany		Harbour tugboat	Orenstein & Koppel	Vogelsand	Y816	1987	278 tonnes	
Nordstrand class Type 725B	6	Germany		Harbour tugboat	Husumer Schiffswerft	Lütje Hörn	Y812	1990	278 tonnes	
Nordstrand class Type 725B	6	Germany		Harbour tugboat	Husumer Schiffswerft	Scharhörn	Y815	1990	278 tonnes	
Nordstrand class Type 725B	6	Germany		Harbour tugboat	Husumer Schiffswerft	Knechtsand	Y814	1990	278 tonnes	
Warnow class Type 660	1	Germany		Tugboat	VEB Yachtwerft Berlin	Warnow	Y1659	1990	22 tonnes	
Miscellaneous (4)
Schwedeneck class Type 748	2	Germany		Trial ship	Lürssen; Kröger-Werft; Elsflether Werft; Abeking & Rasmussen; Nobiskrug	Kronsort	Y861	1987	1,000 tonnes	4 planned initially, 1 cancelled, 1 retired.
Schwedeneck class Type 748	2	Germany		Trial ship	Lürssen; Kröger-Werft; Elsflether Werft; Abeking & Rasmussen; Nobiskrug	Helmsand	Y862	1988	1,000 tonnes	4 planned initially, 1 cancelled, 1 retired.
Planet class	1	Germany		Research ship	Thyssen Nordseewerke	Planet	A1437	2005	3,500 tonnes	
Gorch Fock class	1	Germany		Sail training ship	Blohm + Voss	Gorch Fock	A60	1958	1,760 tonnes	

== Future German Navy ships ==
=== Ships ordered ===
Class	Ordered	Origin	Picture	Type	Builder	Boats/Ships	No.	Comm.	Disp.	Notes
Submarines (6)
Type 212CD class	6	Germany	–	Attack submarine	TKMS	U-37	S193	2032	2,500 tonnes	
Type 212CD class	6	Germany	–	Attack submarine	TKMS	U-38	S194	2034	2,500 tonnes	
Type 212CD class	6	Germany	–	Attack submarine	TKMS	U-39	S195	–	2,500 tonnes	4 approved by parliament for order in December 2024.
Type 212CD class	6	Germany	–	Attack submarine	TKMS	U-40	S196	–	2,500 tonnes	4 approved by parliament for order in December 2024.
Type 212CD class	6	Germany	–	Attack submarine	TKMS	U-41	S197	–	2,500 tonnes	4 approved by parliament for order in December 2024.
Type 212CD class	6	Germany	–	Attack submarine	TKMS	U-42	S198	–	2,500 tonnes	4 approved by parliament for order in December 2024.
Frigates (8)
MEKO A-200 DEU class Type F128	8	Germany	–	Multi-purpose frigate	TKMS; Stahlbau Nord GmbH shipyard	–	–	2029	3,950 tonnes	F126 purchase cancelled in June 2026. Development contract and purchase approved for the F128: 4 ships in July 2026 (+ 4 in option); 4 ships in October 2026.
MEKO A-200 DEU class Type F128	8	Germany	–	Multi-purpose frigate	TKMS; Stahlbau Nord GmbH shipyard	–	–	–	3,950 tonnes	F126 purchase cancelled in June 2026. Development contract and purchase approved for the F128: 4 ships in July 2026 (+ 4 in option); 4 ships in October 2026.
MEKO A-200 DEU class Type F128	8	Germany	–	Multi-purpose frigate	TKMS; Stahlbau Nord GmbH shipyard	–	–	–	3,950 tonnes	F126 purchase cancelled in June 2026. Development contract and purchase approved for the F128: 4 ships in July 2026 (+ 4 in option); 4 ships in October 2026.
MEKO A-200 DEU class Type F128	8	Germany	–	Multi-purpose frigate	TKMS; Stahlbau Nord GmbH shipyard	–	–	–	3,950 tonnes	F126 purchase cancelled in June 2026. Development contract and purchase approved for the F128: 4 ships in July 2026 (+ 4 in option); 4 ships in October 2026.
MEKO A-200 DEU class Type F128	8	Germany	–	Multi-purpose frigate	TKMS; Stahlbau Nord GmbH shipyard	–	–	–	3,950 tonnes	F126 purchase cancelled in June 2026. Development contract and purchase approved for the F128: 4 ships in July 2026 (+ 4 in option); 4 ships in October 2026.
MEKO A-200 DEU class Type F128	8	Germany	–	Multi-purpose frigate	TKMS; Stahlbau Nord GmbH shipyard	–	–	–	3,950 tonnes	F126 purchase cancelled in June 2026. Development contract and purchase approved for the F128: 4 ships in July 2026 (+ 4 in option); 4 ships in October 2026.
MEKO A-200 DEU class Type F128	8	Germany	–	Multi-purpose frigate	TKMS; Stahlbau Nord GmbH shipyard	–	–	–	3,950 tonnes	F126 purchase cancelled in June 2026. Development contract and purchase approved for the F128: 4 ships in July 2026 (+ 4 in option); 4 ships in October 2026.
MEKO A-200 DEU class Type F128	8	Germany	–	Multi-purpose frigate	TKMS; Stahlbau Nord GmbH shipyard	–	–	–	3,950 tonnes	F126 purchase cancelled in June 2026. Development contract and purchase approved for the F128: 4 ships in July 2026 (+ 4 in option); 4 ships in October 2026.
Corvettes (4)
Braunschweig class Type K130 - Batch 2	4	Germany		General-purpose corvette	* Lürssen (lead); TKMS; German Naval Yards	Emden	F266	2026	1,840 tonnes	Order of the second batch in September 2017.
Braunschweig class Type K130 - Batch 2	4	Germany		General-purpose corvette	* Lürssen (lead); TKMS; German Naval Yards	Karlsruhe	F267	–	1,840 tonnes	Order of the second batch in September 2017.
Braunschweig class Type K130 - Batch 2	4	Germany		General-purpose corvette	* Lürssen (lead); TKMS; German Naval Yards	Augsburg	F268	–	1,840 tonnes	Order of the second batch in September 2017.
Braunschweig class Type K130 - Batch 2	4	Germany		General-purpose corvette	* Lürssen (lead); TKMS; German Naval Yards	Lübeck	F269	–	1,840 tonnes	Order of the second batch in September 2017.
Intelligence ships (3)									1,840 tonnes	Order of the second batch in September 2017.
Type 424	3	Germany	–	SIGINT / ELINT vessel	NVL Group	–	–	2029	–	Replacement of the Type 423 Oste class, ordered in July 2023.
Type 424	3	Germany	–	SIGINT / ELINT vessel	NVL Group	–	–	2030	–	Replacement of the Type 423 Oste class, ordered in July 2023.
Type 424	3	Germany	–	SIGINT / ELINT vessel	NVL Group	–	–	2031	–	Replacement of the Type 423 Oste class, ordered in July 2023.
Light boats (12)
Watercat M18 AMC	15	Finland		Multi-purpose combat boats / landing craft	Marine Alutech	–	–	2029 - 2031	32 tonnes	Contract signed in October 2026.
MST FRISC; Fast Raiding Interception and Special Forces Craft	12	Netherlands		Rigid hull inflatable mission boat	Marine Specialised Technology Ltd.	–	–	2028	7 tonnes	Purchased to equip the F126 Niedersachsen. This class of frigates was cancelled, it will likely equip the F128.
Replenishment ships (2)
Type 707	2	Germany		Combat support ship	NVL Group (design); Meyer Werft; Neptun Werft	–	–	2026	20,000 tonnes	Successor of the Type 704 Rhön class.
Type 707	2	Germany		Combat support ship	NVL Group (design); Meyer Werft; Neptun Werft	–	–	–	20,000 tonnes	Successor of the Type 704 Rhön class.
Miscellaneous (4)
Seebasierte Ausbildung und Seeversuche See	4	Germany	–	Training ships / sea trials	Fassmer GmbH & Co. KG	–	–	2028	–	
Seebasierte Ausbildung und Seeversuche See	4	Germany	–	Training ships / sea trials	Fassmer GmbH & Co. KG	–	–	2029	–	
Seebasierte Ausbildung und Seeversuche See	4	Germany	–	Training ships / sea trials	Fassmer GmbH & Co. KG	–	–	2029	–	
Seebasierte Ausbildung und Seeversuche See	4	Germany	–	Training ships / sea trials	Fassmer GmbH & Co. KG	–	–	2029	–	

=== Planned investments ===
Class	Planned	Origin	Type	Builder	Ships	No.	Comm.	Disp.	Notes
Submarines
Type 212CD	3 to 6 additional	Germany	Attack submarine	TKMS	–	–	2035 +	2,500 tonnes	Total of 9 to 12 submarines planned.
Large unmanned underwater vehicle	Up to 12	–	Unmanned underwater vehicle	–	–	–	2035+	–	
Frigates
MEKO A-400 AMD class Type F127 frigate	8	Germany	Air defense frigate	TKMS / NVL	–	F233	–	10,000 tonnes	Planned to replace the F124 Sachsen class.
MEKO A-400 AMD class Type F127 frigate	8	Germany	Air defense frigate	TKMS / NVL	–	F234	–	10,000 tonnes	Planned to replace the F124 Sachsen class.
MEKO A-400 AMD class Type F127 frigate	8	Germany	Air defense frigate	TKMS / NVL	–	F235	–	10,000 tonnes	Planned to replace the F124 Sachsen class.
MEKO A-400 AMD class Type F127 frigate	8	Germany	Air defense frigate	TKMS / NVL	–	F236	–	10,000 tonnes	Planned to replace the F124 Sachsen class.
MEKO A-400 AMD class Type F127 frigate	8	Germany	Air defense frigate	TKMS / NVL	–	F235	–	10,000 tonnes	Planned to replace the F124 Sachsen class.
MEKO A-400 AMD class Type F127 frigate	8	Germany	Air defense frigate	TKMS / NVL	–	F236	–	10,000 tonnes	Planned to replace the F124 Sachsen class.
Unmanned surface combat vessels
LRMV; Large Remote Multi-purpose Vessel	3	Germany	Unmanned surface vessel	–	–	–	–	–	Unmanned vessel in complement to frigates, supporting with anti-air defence and maritime strikes.
LRMV; Large Remote Multi-purpose Vessel	3	Germany	Unmanned surface vessel	–	–	–	–	–	Unmanned vessel in complement to frigates, supporting with anti-air defence and maritime strikes.
LRMV; Large Remote Multi-purpose Vessel	3	Germany	Unmanned surface vessel	–	–	–	–	–	Unmanned vessel in complement to frigates, supporting with anti-air defence and maritime strikes.
Corvettes
Future Combat Surface System	18+	Germany	General-purpose corvette	–	–	–	2035+	–	Plan beyond 2035.
Mine counter-measures
MJ334 Minenabwehr Plattform	12+	Germany	Minehunter	–	–	–	2035+	–	Successor of the Type 332 Frankenthal class as per the Zielbild Marine 2035+ plan.
Minenabwehr Toolbox	To be defined	–	Unmanned mine counter-measure system	–	–	–	2035+	–	Unmanned tool to be used by the Minenabwehr Plattform as per the Zielbild Marine 2035+ plan.
Light boats
MZKB	40+	–	Multi-role rigid hull inflatable mission boat	–	–	–	2029 - 2035	–	
Intelligence ships (3)
Type 424	1	Germany	SIGINT / ELINT vessel	NVL Group	–	–	2032	–	A fourth ship is planned to be purchased.
Replenishment ships
Unterstützung platform	6	Germany	Logistic, operation support and reconnaissance	NVL Group (NTV 130 offer, 14,000 tonnes).	–	–	From 2030s	–	Successor of the Type 404 Elbe class as per the Zielbild Marine 2035+ plan.
Tugboats (up to 20)
Type 724	10 (+10 in option)	Germany	Harbour tugboats	–	–	–	–	–	Tender process opened in October 2026. The requirements are for an existing serial produced tugboat, with container and working decks, with towing and salvage equipment.

== See also ==
- German Navy:
  - List of active aircraft of the German Navy
  - List of active weapons of the German Navy
  - List of ship classes of the Bundesmarine and Deutsche Marine
  - List of ships of the German navies
  - Kommando Spezialkräfte Marine (German Navy special forces)
- German Army:
  - List of modern equipment of the German Army
- German Air Force:
  - List of active equipment of the German Air Force
- German Army equipment pages in German:
  - List of small arms of the Bundeswehr
  - List of Bundeswehr ammunition
  - List of wheeled vehicles of the Bundeswehr
  - List of tracked vehicles of the Bundeswehr
  - List of aircraft of the Bundeswehr
