= List of active weapons of the German Navy =

This is a list of active German Navy weapons as of 2025. These weapons are operated by the ships, submarines and aircraft of the German Navy.

== Weapons for submarines ==
=== Sea mines ===
Model	Image	Origin	Type	Used with	Quantity	Notes
FG.1 (Faun-Werke) DM 41 - G1	—	Germany	Sea floor mine	Type 212A class	—	
DM51 - G4 (AEG / Telefunken)	—	Germany Denmark	Sea floor mine (anti-invasion)	Type 212A class	—	
SGM 80 (STN Atlas) Seegrundmine 80, DM 61 - G2	—	Germany	Sea floor mine	Type 212A class	—	

=== Torpedoes ===
Model	Image	Origin	Type	Calibre	Used with	Quantity	Notes
DM2A4 Seehecht (Atlas Elektronik)		Germany	Heavyweight torpedo	533 mm (21.0 in)	Type 212A class	—	Used with the Type 212A class, entered service in 2008. Pre-serie of 10 DM2A4. Some of the equipment of 69 DM2A4 have been modernised and tested since 2020.

== Weapons for surface vessels ==
=== Anti-mine drones ===
Model	Image	Origin	Type	Used with	Quantity	Notes
SeeFuchs drone		Germany	Mine reconnaissance, identification and destruction	Frankenthal class (Type 332)	—	

=== Sea mines ===
Model	Image	Origin	Type	Used with	Quantity	Notes
FG.1 (Faun-Werke) DM 41 - G1	—	Germany	Sea floor mine	Braunschweig class (Type K130 - batfch 1) Ensdorf class (Type 352) Frankenthal class (Type 332)	—	
DM51 - G4 (AEG / Telefunken)	—	Germany Denmark	Sea floor mine (anti-invasion)	Braunschweig class (Type K130 - batfch 1) Ensdorf class (Type 352) Frankenthal class (Type 332)	—	
SGM 80 (STN Atlas) Seegrundmine 80, DM 61 - G2	—	Germany	Sea floor mine	Braunschweig class (Type K130 - batfch 1) Ensdorf class (Type 352) Frankenthal class (Type 332)	—	

=== Torpedoes ===
Model	Image	Origin	Type	Used with	Quantity	Notes
Torpedo launchers
Mark 32 Mod 9 SVTT Surface vessel torpedo tubes		United States	Twin torpedo launching system	Brandenburg class (Type F123)	8 (2 × 2 cells per ship)	
Eurotorp B515		France Italy	Triple torpedo launching system	Sachsen class (Type F124)	6 (2 × 3 cells per ship)	
Torpedoes
Mark 46 Mod 5 torpedo		United States	Lightweight torpedo (anti-submarine)	Brandenburg class (Type F123)	—	
MU90 Impact		France Italy	Lightweight torpedo (anti-submarine)	Sachsen class (Type F124)	—	

=== Anti-air weapons ===
Model	Image	Origin	Type	Used with	Quantity	Notes
Anti-air missile launchers
Mark 41 VLS (Mod 4)		United States	VLS Vertical launching system	Brandenburg class (Type F123)	8 (2 × 8 cells per ship)	Used to launch the RIM-7 and the RIM-162 missiles, 16 cells per ship in total.
Mark 41 VLS (Mod 10)		United States	VLS Vertical launching system	Sachsen class (Type F124)	12 (4 × 8 cells per ship)	Used to launch the SM-2 and the RIM-162 missiles, 32 cells per ship in total.
Mk 49 GMLS Guided Missile Launching System		Germany United States	Close-in defence missile launcher	Brandenburg class (Type F123) Sachsen class (Type F124) Baden-Württemberg class (Type F125) Braunschweig class (Type K130 - batfch 1)	32	Each launcher has 21 cells, 2 launchers are used on each ship.
Anti-air missiles
SM-2 Block IIIA RIM-66 Standard Missile 2		United States	Surface-to-air missile (long range)	Sachsen class (Type F124)	~ 70	Launched from Mk41 VLS (1 missile per cell). 108 missiles received between 2003 and 2005. With the operations and exercises, 70 seem to remain in the German Navy.
RIM-162 ESSM		United States	Surface-to-air missile (medium range)	Brandenburg class (Type F123) Sachsen class (Type F124)	—	Launched from Mk41 VLS (4 missiles per cell).: 175 RIM-162B (Block I) originally ordered for the F124 class.; RIM-162 (block II) ordered in 2023.; RIM-162 (block II) approved for order in October 2025 (€480 million).
RIM-7M Sea Sparrow (NSSM)		United States	Surface-to-air missile (short range)	Brandenburg class (Type F123)	—	Launched from Mk41 VLS (1 missile per cell).
RIM-116 RAM Rolling Airframe Missile		Germany United States	Surface-to-air missile (very short range)	Brandenburg class (Type F123) Sachsen class (Type F124) Baden-Württemberg class (Type F125) Braunschweig class (Type K130 - batfch 1)	—	Variants used by the German Navy: RIM-116B (Block 1A); RIM-116C (Block 2); 600 RIM-116E (Block 2B) ordered in 2022; 400 RIM-116E (Block 2B) ordered in 2024
FIM-92 Stinger		United States	MANPADS Man Portable Air Defence System	Ensdorf class (Type 352) Frankenthal class (Type 332) Berlin class (Type 702) Rhön class (Type 704) Elbe class (Type 404)	—	

=== Cruise missiles ===
Model	Image	Origin	Type	Used with	Quantity	Notes
Cruise missile launchers
Mk 141		United States	Side quad anti-ship missile launcher	Brandenburg class (Type F123) Sachsen class (Type F124) Baden-Württemberg class (Type F125)	22	To be replaced by the RBS 15 Mk3 on the F123 class, and the NSM on the F124 and F125 classes.
RBS15 Mk3		Sweden Germany	Dual cruise missile launcher	Braunschweig class (Type K130 - Batch 1) Brandenburg class (Type F123)	18 (+ 10 to enter service)	The Brandenburg class is being modernised, and the RBS 15 replaces the Harpoon missiles. And it will equip the second batch of 5 K130 corvettes.
Cruise missiles
RGM-84A Harpoon		United States	Anti-ship cruise missile	Brandenburg class (Type F123)	—	The Harppon replaced the MM38 Exocet missile, and being replaced by the RBS-15 Mk3 on the Brandenburg class. The Harpoon used on the F123 come from the Bremen class (Type F122).
RGM-84D Harpoon		United States	Anti-ship cruise missile	Sachsen class (Type F124) Baden-Württemberg class (Type F125)	—	To be replaced by the NSM missiles on the F124 and F125 classes.
RBS15 Mk3		Sweden Germany	Anti-ship cruise missile / Land attack cruise missile	Braunschweig class (Type K130 - Batch 1) Brandenburg class (Type F123)	100	The Brandenburg class is being modernised, and the RBS 15 replaces the Harpoon missiles. It will also equip the second batch of 5 K130 corvettes. Orders: 25 in 2012.; 75 in 2020 out of a framework agreement for up to 160 missiles

=== Naval guns ===
Model	Image	Origin	Type	Calibre	Used with	Quantity	Notes
Naval guns
OTO 127/64 LW - VULCANO System		Italy	Naval gun	127×835mmR	Baden-Württemberg class (Type F125)	5	1 training gun used purchased with the 4 of the F125 class. Further orders: 6 ordered for the F126; Planned to be used with the F127
OTO Melara 76 L/62 Super Rapid		Italy	Naval gun	76×636mmR	Brandenburg class (Type F123) Sachsen class (Type F124) Braunschweig class (Type K130 - Batch 1)	12	Further orders: 5 more with the K130 - Batch 2 (with stealthy cupola)
MLG 27		Germany	Naval remote control self-defense gun	27×145mm	Brandenburg class (Type F123)	8 (2 × per ship)	
MLG 27		Germany	Naval remote control self-defense gun	27×145mm	Sachsen class (Type F124)	6 (2 × per ship)	
MLG 27		Germany	Naval remote control self-defense gun	27×145mm	Baden-Württemberg class (Type F125)	8 (2 × per ship)	
MLG 27		Germany	Naval remote control self-defense gun	27×145mm	Braunschweig class (Type K130 - Batch 1)	10 (2 × per ship)	
MLG 27		Germany	Naval remote control self-defense gun	27×145mm	Ensdorf class (Type 352)	4 (2 × per ship)	
MLG 27		Germany	Naval remote control self-defense gun	27×145mm	Frankenthal class (Type 332)	8 (1 × per ship)	
MLG 27		Germany	Naval remote control self-defense gun	27×145mm	Berlin class (Type 702)	12 (4 × per ship)	
MLG 27		Germany	Naval remote control self-defense gun	27×145mm	Elbe class (Type 404)	12 (2 × per ship)	
Shells for naval guns
Vulcano 127 mm GLR Guided Long Range	—	Italy Germany	Guided long range artillery shell	127×835mmR	Baden-Württemberg class (Type F125)	—	Qualified in 2022. Guided by GPS + IMU and it has an IR sensor for terminal guidance.
Vulcano 127 mm BER Ballistic Extended Range	—	Italy Germany	Unguided long-range artillery shell	127×835mmR	Baden-Württemberg class (Type F125)	—	Qualified in 2022, 60 km range, with multifunction fuse.
Diehl training 127 mm shells	—	Germany	Training artillery shells	127×835mmR	Baden-Württemberg class (Type F125)	7,000	Framework agreement in 2020 for up to 13,000 training shells with propellant, and firm order of 7,000 shells in December 2020.

=== Small arms ===
This section lists small arms installed on the German Navy vessels.

Model	Image	Origin	Type	Calibre	Used with	Quantity	Notes
Leonardo Hitrole NT Naval Tilting		Italy	RCHMG Remote Controlled Heavy Machine Gun)	12.7×99mm NATO	Baden-Württemberg class (Type F125)	15 (5 × per ship)	
M2 Browning		Belgium	Heavy Machine Gun	12.7×99mm NATO	Brandenburg class (Type F123)	16 (4 × per ship)	
M2 Browning		Belgium	Heavy Machine Gun	12.7×99mm NATO	Sachsen class (Type F124)	12 (4 × per ship)	
M2 Browning		Belgium	Heavy Machine Gun	12.7×99mm NATO	Braunschweig class (Type K130 - Batch 1)	20 (4 × per ship)	
M2 Browning		Belgium	Heavy Machine Gun	12.7×99mm NATO	Frankenthal class (Type 332)	20 (2 × per ship)	
M2 Browning		Belgium	Heavy Machine Gun	12.7×99mm NATO	Oste class (Type 423)	12 (4 × per ship)	
M2 Browning		Belgium	Heavy Machine Gun	12.7×99mm NATO	Berlin class (Type 702)	12 (4 × per ship)	
M2 Browning		Belgium	Heavy Machine Gun	12.7×99mm NATO	Elbe class (Type 404)	24 (4 × per ship)	

== Weapons for aircraft ==
This is the list of weapons used by the Marineflieger.

=== Anti-submarine weapons ===
Model	Image	Origin	Type	Calibre	Used with	Quantity	Notes
Mark 46 Mod 5 torpedo		United States	Lightweight torpedo (anti-submarine)	323.7 mm (12.74 in)	Westland Sea Lynx Mk 88A Lockheed P-3C CUP+ Orion	—	Both aircraft to be retired soon, and the use of this torpedo in aerial anti-submarine warfare will end.
MU90 Impact		France Italy	Lightweight torpedo (anti-submarine)	323.7 mm (12.74 in)	Westland Sea Lynx Mk 88A	—	Torpedo to be used in the future with the 31 NH90 NFH "Sea Tiger", the successor of the Sea Lynx.

=== Small arms ===
Model	Image	Origin	Type	Calibre	Used with	Quantity	Notes
FN Herstal M3M		Belgium	Door helicopter machine gun	12.7×99 mm NATO	Westland Sea Lynx Mk 88A NH90 NTH "Sea Lion"	—	1 can be installed on the Sea Lynx, 2 on the Sea Lion.

== Future weapons ==
=== Weapons for submarines ===
==== Torpedoes ====
Model	Image	Origin	Type	Calibre	To be used with	Quantity	Notes
CHWT / DM2A5 Common Heavy Weight Torpedo	—	Germany	Heavyweight torpedo	533 mm (21.0 in)	Type 212CD class	—	Successor of the DM2A4 Seehecht currently in development for the Type 212CD. The financing of its development was approved in December 2025.
Atlas Elektronik SeaSpider ATT Anti-Torpedo Torpedo	—	Germany Canada	Anti-torpedo torpedo	—	Type 212CD class	—	

==== Anti-air weapons ====
Model	Image	Origin	Type	To be used with	Quantity	Notes
IDAS Interactive Defence and Attack System for Submarines		Germany Norway Turkey	Anti-air missile (underwater launch, also usable against small vessels)	Type 212A class Type 212CD class	—	Derived from IRIS-T missile.

=== Weapons for surface vessels ===
==== Anti-air weapons ====
Model	Image	Origin	Type	To be used with	Quantity	Notes
Anti-air missile launchers
Mark 41 VLS		United States	VLS Vertical launching system	Niedersachsen class (Type F126)	12 (2 × 8 cells per ship)	2 modules with each 8 cells per ship. Mk 41 capable of "Any weapon / any cell".
Mk 49 GMLS Guided Missile Launching System		Germany United States	Close-in defence missile launcher	Braunschweig class (Type K130 - Batch 2)	10 (2 × per ship)	
Mk 49 GMLS Guided Missile Launching System		Germany United States	Close-in defence missile launcher	Niedersachsen class (Type F126)	12 (2 × per ship)	
IRIS-T SLM		Germany	Missile launcher Transporter Erector Launcher	Baden-Württemberg class (Type F125)	8 (2 × per ship)	Integration of two launcher of 16 missiles each on the Type F125 fleet.
Anti-air missiles
IRIS-T SLM		Germany	Surface-to-air missile (short range)	Baden-Württemberg class (Type F125)	—	Integration of two launcher of 16 missiles each on the Type F125 fleet.
RIM-162 ESSM		United States	Surface-to-air missile (short range)	Niedersachsen class (Type F126)	—	
Anti-air missile launchers
ARGE HEL (consortium with MBDA Deutschland / Rheinmetall Waffe Munition GmbH)	—	Germany	High energy laser system (short range)	Baden-Württemberg class (Type F125) Niedersachsen class (Type F126)	—	Development for an active system in 2029, based on R&D from a 2021 contract.

==== Cruise missiles ====
Model	Image	Origin	Type	To be used with	Quantity	Notes
Cruise missile launchers
NSM Launcher		Norway	Side quad anti-ship missile launcher	Sachsen class (Type F124) Baden-Württemberg class (Type F125) Meko A200 DEU class (Type F128)	26	Two quad-launchers per ship.
Cruise missiles
NSM (Block 1A) Naval Strike Missile		Norway	Anti-ship cruise missile / Land attack cruise missile	Sachsen class (Type F124) Baden-Württemberg class (Type F125) Meko A200 DEU class (Type F128)	—	Successor of the RGM-84 Harpoon on the F124 and F125 classes.
3SM Tryfing Super Sonic Strike Missile	—	Germany Norway	Anti-ship cruise missile / Land attack cruise missile	Sachsen class (Type F124) Baden-Württemberg class (Type F125)	—	To be launched from Mk41 VLS.

==== Naval guns ====
Model	Image	Origin	Type	Calibre	To be used with	Quantity	Notes
OTO 127/64 LW - VULCANO System		Italy	Naval gun	127×835mmR	Niedersachsen class (Type F126)	6 (1 × per ship)	
OTO Melara 76 L/62 Super Rapid - Stealth cupola		Italy	Naval gun	76×636mmR	Braunschweig class (Type K130 - Batch 1)	5	
MSI-DS Seahawk DS30M A2		United Kingdom	Naval remote control self-defense gun	30×173mm	Brandenburg class (Type F123 - MLU)	3 (1 × per ship)	
MSI-DS Seahawk DS30M A2		United Kingdom	Naval remote control self-defense gun	30×173mm	Meko A200 DEU class (Type F128)	12 (3 × per ship)	
MLG 27 4.0		Germany	Naval remote control self-defense gun	27×145mm	Braunschweig class (Type K130 - Batch 1)	10 (2 × per ship)	

=== Weapons for aircraft ===
This is the list of weapons that will be used by the Marineflieger.

==== Anti-submarine weapons ====
Model	Image	Origin	Type	Calibre	To be used with	Quantity	Notes
Mark 54 mod 0 - torpedo		United States	Lightweight torpedo (anti-submarine)	323.7 mm (12.74 in)	Boeing P-8A Poseidon	36	36 combat torpedoes approved for order in June 2024.
Mark 54 mod 0 - training torpedo		United States	Lightweight training torpedo	323.7 mm (12.74 in)	Boeing P-8A Poseidon	12	12 training torpedoes approved for order in June 2024.
Sting Ray Mod 2		United Kingdom	Lightweight torpedo (anti-submarine)	323.7 mm (12.74 in)	Boeing P-8A Poseidon	—	Selected in May 2025 for the German Navy.

== Potential and planned weapons ==
=== Weapons for submarines ===
==== Cruise missiles ====
Model	Image	Origin	Type	To be potentially used with	Quantity	Notes
3SM Tryfing Super Sonic Strike Missile	—	Germany Norway	Anti-ship cruise missile / Land attack cruise missile	Type 212CD class	—	Both being considered, likely only one will be selected.
NSM-SL Naval Strike Missile - Submarine Launched		Norway	Anti-ship cruise missile / Land attack cruise missile	Type 212CD class	—	Both being considered, likely only one will be selected.

=== Weapons for surface vessels ===
==== Anti-air weapons ====
Model	Image	Origin	Type	To be potentially used with	Quantity	Notes
Mark 41 VLS		United States	VLS Vertical launching system	MEKO A-400 AMD class (Type F127)	12 (2 × 32 cells per ship)	2 groups of 32 cells for the 6 ships. The Mk 41 will be capable of "Any weapon / any cell".
Mk 49 GMLS Guided Missile Launching System		Germany United States	Close-in defence missile launcher	MEKO A-400 AMD class (Type F127)	12 (2 × per ship)	Almost certainly 2 on each of the F127 frigates.
Anti-air missiles
SM-2 Block IIIA RIM-66 Standard Missile 2		United States	Surface-to-air missile (long range)	MEKO A-400 AMD class (Type F127)	—	Very likely to be used with the F127.
SM-6 RIM-174 Standard Missile 6		United States	Surface-to-air missile (long range)	MEKO A-400 AMD class (Type F127)	—	Very likely to be used with the F127.
SM-3 RIM-161 Standard Missile 3		United States	Surface-to-air missile (exo-atmospheric, anti-ballistic missile / anti-satellite)	MEKO A-400 AMD class (Type F127)	—	Potential air-defence weapons.
Patriot PAC-3 MSE		United States Germany	Surface-to-air missile (medium range)	MEKO A-400 AMD class (Type F127)	—	Potential air-defence weapons.
RIM-162 ESSM		United States	Surface-to-air missile (short range)	MEKO A-400 AMD class (Type F127)	—	Potential air-defence weapons. Quad-pack in Mk41.
IRIS-T SLX	—	Germany	Surface-to-air missile (medium range)	MEKO A-400 AMD class (Type F127)	—	Potential air-defence weapons.
IRIS-T SLM		Germany	Surface-to-air missile (short range)	MEKO A-400 AMD class (Type F127)	—	Potential air-defence weapons. Quad-pack in Mk41.

==== Cruise missiles ====
Model	Image	Origin	Type	To be potentially used with	Quantity	Notes
RGM-109E Tomahawk Block V LACM		United States	Land attack cruise missile	Brandenburg class (Type F123) Sachsen class (Type F124) Niedersachsen class (Type F126) MEKO A-400 AMD class (Type F127)	—	

==== Naval guns ====
Model	Image	Origin	Type	Calibre	To be potentially used with	Quantity	Notes
Seahawk		United Kingdom	Naval remote control self-defense gun	30×173mm	MEKO A-400 AMD class (Type F127)Type 424	75 (+100 in option)	Programme qNFMLG (querschnittliche Nachfolgelösung für das Marineleichtgeschütz).
Rheinmetall Air Defence SeaSnake 30	—	Switzerland Germany	Naval remote control self-defense gun	30×173mm	MEKO A-400 AMD class (Type F127)Type 424	75 (+100 in option)	Programme qNFMLG (querschnittliche Nachfolgelösung für das Marineleichtgeschütz).
Rheinmetall Air Defence AG - 20kW laser	—	Switzerland Germany	Laser gun	—	MEKO A-400 AMD class (Type F127)	—	

=== Weapons for aircraft ===
This is the list of weapons that might get purchased for the Marineflieger.

==== Cruise missiles ====
The German Navy is considering a missile for the NH90 NFH Sea Tiger. The table includes the potential missiles.

Model	Image	Origin	Type	To be potentially used with	Quantity	Notes
NSM-AL Naval Standard Missile - Air-Launched		Norway	Anti-ship cruise missile	NH90 NFH "Sea Tiger"	—	A variant of the NSM-AL is being studied by Spain for the naval NH90, and could interest Germany.
MBDA Marte ER		Italy	Anti-ship cruise missile	NH90 NFH "Sea Tiger"	—	Missile tested and qualified on the Sea Tiger variant of the NH90.
Sea Venom / ANL Anti-Navire Léger		United Kingdom France	Anti-ship cruise missile	NH90 NFH "Sea Tiger"	—	

=== Naval mines ===
The sea mines can usually be operated from ships, submarines or even aircraft and land vehicles.

Model	Image	Origin	Type	To be potentially used with	Quantity	Notes
Forcit Blocker PM16	—	Finland Germany	Sea mines	Type 212A class Type 212CD class (also surface vessels)	—	Letter of intent signed in 2024 for the purchase of mines, unclear which one yet. Forcit collaborates with TDW for its German offer. Two mine models offered RWM Italia SpA.
Asteria and / or Murena	—	Italy	Sea mines	Type 212A class Type 212CD class (also surface vessels)	—	Letter of intent signed in 2024 for the purchase of mines, unclear which one yet. Forcit collaborates with TDW for its German offer. Two mine models offered RWM Italia SpA.

== See also ==
- German Navy:
  - List of active German Navy ships
  - List of active aircraft of the German Navy
  - List of ship classes of the Bundesmarine and Deutsche Marine
  - List of ships of the German navies
  - Kommando Spezialkräfte Marine (German Navy special forces)
- German Army:
  - List of modern equipment of the German Army
- German Air Force:
  - List of active equipment of the German Air Force
- German Army equipment pages in German:
  - List of small arms of the Bundeswehr
  - List of Bundeswehr ammunition
  - List of wheeled vehicles of the Bundeswehr
  - List of tracked vehicles of the Bundeswehr
  - List of aircraft of the Bundeswehr
