= RNAS Portland =

Former Royal Naval Air Station in Dorset, England

RNAS Portland (HMS Osprey)
- Near Portland, Dorset in England
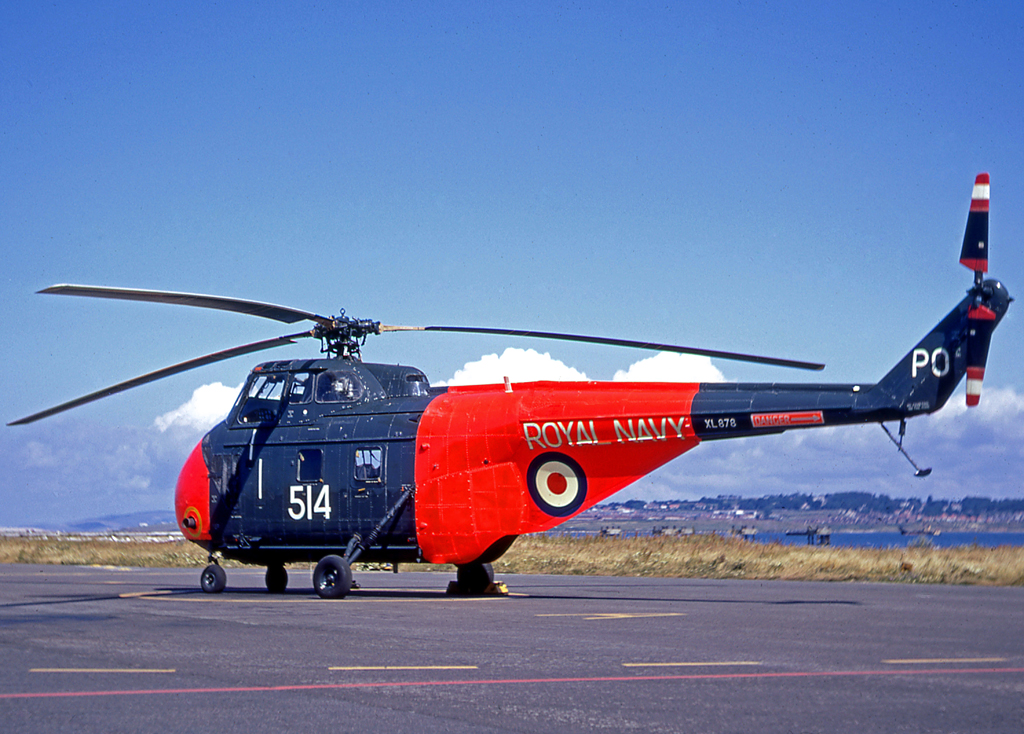
- Westland Whirlwind HAS.7 XL878 of 771 Naval Air Squadron at RNAS Portland Dorset in 1967

Site information
- Type: Royal Naval Air Station
- Owner: Ministry of Defence
- Operator: Royal Navy

Location
- Shown within Dorset
- Coordinates: 50°34′08″N 002°27′02″W

Site history
- Built: 1917
- In use: 1917–1999

Airfield information
- Elevation: 1 metre (3 ft 3 in) AMSL
Helipads
Number	Length and surface
03/21	230 metres (755 ft) Asphalt

RNAS Portland (ICAO: EGDP) was an air station of the Royal Navy, situated at the Isle of Portland, Dorset, England. It was established in 1917 on the western edge of Portland Harbour as HMS Sarepta. From 1959 the station shared the name HMS Osprey, the anti-submarine establishment based at Portland, with helicopters used for research and development in anti-submarine techniques. RNAS Portland remained operational until 1999.

== History ==
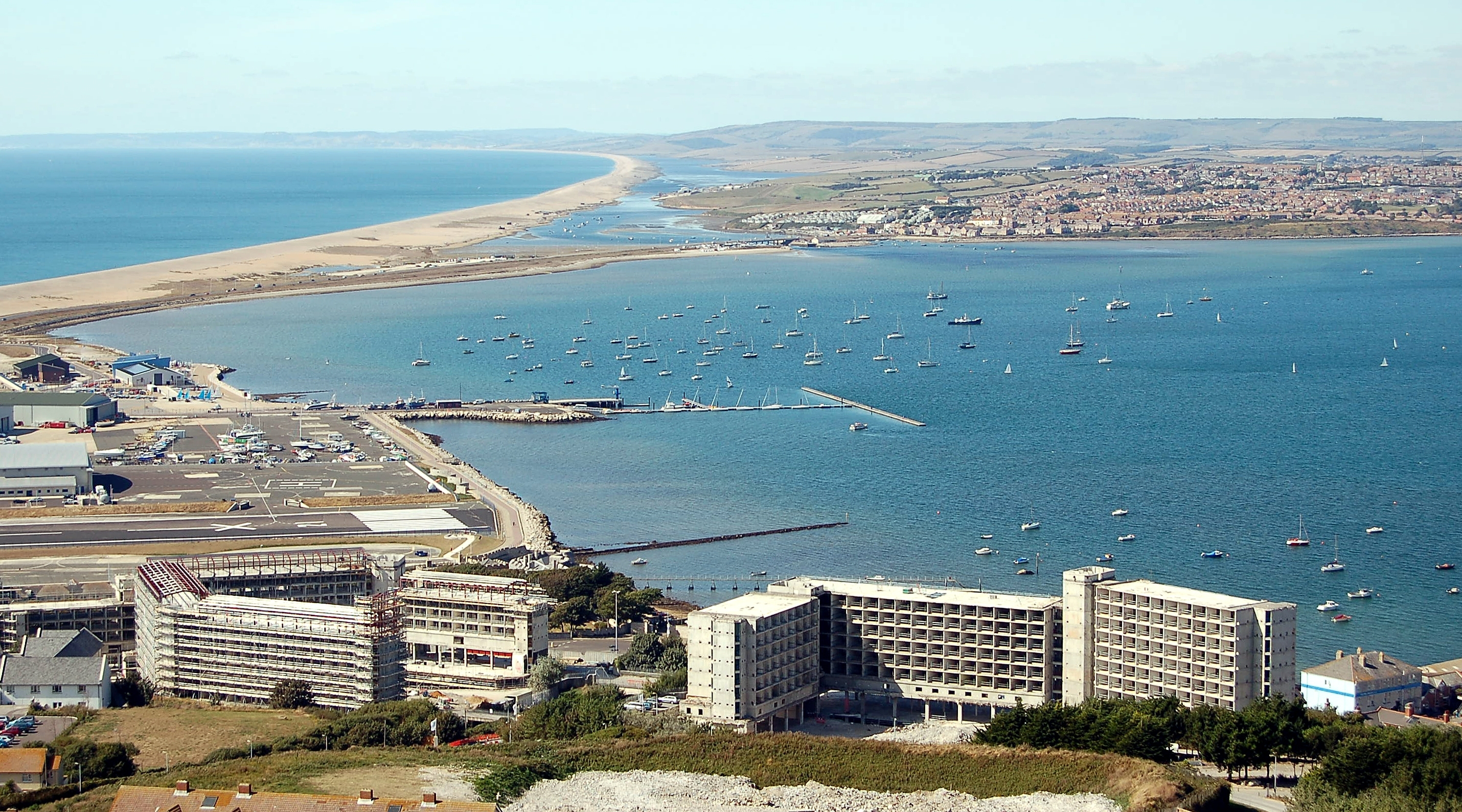
Osprey Quay, the site of the former RNAS Portland, seen in 2006.

The original seaplane base was established during World War I, in 1917, as HMS Sarepta. The station used floatplanes, which flew coastal patrols to protect shipping from German U-boat attacks. In August 1918 HMS Sarepta was taken over by the RAF, and a larger unit of 12 aircraft was formed as No. 241 Squadron RAF. Following the Armistice in November 1918, the squadron was disbanded and aviation operations ceased at Portland in 1919.

Following the inter-war period, a Fleet Requirements Unit, 772 Squadron, arrived at Portland in September 1939 and stayed until July 1940. With the fall of France early in the war, the Naval Base at Portland became a prime target for the Luftwaffe. As a result, HMS Osprey was moved to Campbeltown in July 1940, taking 772 Squadron with it, and leaving Portland's base to remain under Care and Maintenance.

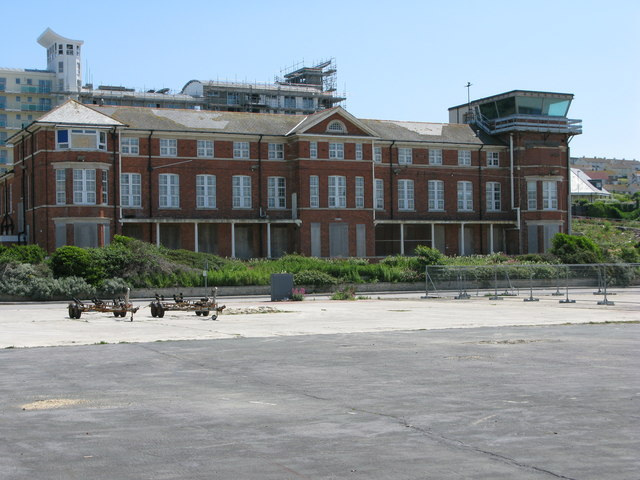
The former headquarters building, operations centre and control tower.

After the war HMS Osprey returned to Portland and a helicopter base became an important centre for the school to perform experiments and development. In 1946 Sikorsky R-4Bs moved in and the success of their trials at Portland led the Admiralty to replace fixed-wing aircraft with helicopters for use in the fleet. A major building programme followed at Portland, with the base's playing fields taken over as a landing ground, while the old fleet canteen was converted into a headquarters building, containing the operations centre, a workshop and control tower.

During the late 1950s the marshy area known as the Mere was filled in and built over, and later expansion meant that this tidal lagoon was completely covered. This created a large concreted area to produce the modern, large helicopter facility. Upon the completion of the work, 815 Naval Air Squadron flew its 12 Westland Whirlwinds to the new Portland Heliport on 14 April 1959. The station was formally commissioned as HMS Osprey on 24 April 1959.

For the next 40 years RNAS Portland was one of the busiest air stations on the south coast. As a helicopter development and training base, it was largely responsible for training aircrew in anti-submarine operations. The site of the base was gradually improved over the years, with considerable expansion in the 1960s and 1970s, notably between 1967 and 1970, with new hangars.

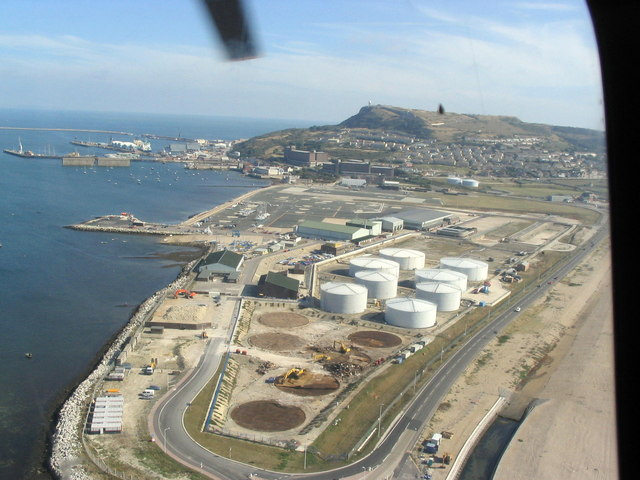
The former RNAS, seen in September 2003, when much of the site was being redeveloped for academy, and a new hangar planned for the adjacent coastguard helicopter.

With the reduction of armed forces, Portland's naval base closed on 29 March 1996, with Flag Officer Sea Training (FOST) moving to Plymouth. With this RNAS Portland became surplus to requirements, leading to its eventual closure on 31 March 1999. RNAS Portland held its final open day for the public on 17 October 1998.

Following the closure of the base, the 80-acre site was renamed Osprey Quay in 2001, as part of the site's regeneration project. The Weymouth and Portland National Sailing Academy was established there in 1999 and began redevelopment in 2003. A SAR helicopter operated by Bristow Helicopters for the MCA (Maritime and Coastguard Agency) was also based at the quay until 2017.

By 2012 Osprey Quay had been transformed into a mixed use site. Aside from the academy, the site offered over 11 hectares of business space, along with a new Dean & Reddyhoff Marina, Portland Marina. The redevelopment of the station's former Helicopter Control Tower has also been announced.

With the removal of the Coastguard Helicopter Service from Portland on 1 July 2017 the site once again become surplus to requirements and in October 2016 the formal process for the disposal of the site was commenced by the Homes & Communities Agency. With much support from the local MP (Richard Drax) and the local population the company who provided the aircrew that fly the Coastguard helicopters at Portland, HeliOperations, has purchased the site. The company now provides training services for Search & Rescue aircrew.

== Squadrons (1959–1999) ==
- 737 Naval Air Squadron (August 1959 – February 1983)
- 771 Naval Air Squadron (July 1961 – December 1964 and June 1967 – September 1974)
- 829 Naval Air Squadron (December 1964 – March 1993)
- 703 Naval Air Squadron (January 1972 – January 1981)
- 772 Naval Air Squadron (September 1974 – September 1995)
- 702 Naval Air Squadron (July 1982 – January 1999)
- 810 Naval Air Squadron (Detached regularly 1982–1999)
- 815 Naval Air Squadron (April 1959 – August 1959 and July 1982 – February 1999)

== See also ==
- List of air stations of the Royal Navy
