= Marineflieger =

German naval aviation

Naval Aviation Command
- Marinefliegerkommando
- Insignia of the Marinefliegerkommando
- Founded: 1956; 70 years ago
- Country: Germany
- Branch: German Navy
- Type: Naval aviation
- Size: 2,500 personnel 57 aircraft
- Part of: German Navy
- Garrison/HQ: Nordholz Naval Airbase

Commanders
- Kommandeur des Marinefliegerkommandos: Kapitän zur See Broder Nielsen

Insignia
- Roundel

- Fin flash

Aircraft flown
- Attack: Sea Lynx Mk 88 A P-3C Orion
- Patrol: Sea King Mk 41; Sea Lynx Mk 88 A P-3C Orion
- Reconnaissance: P-3C Orion; Dornier 228 LM
- Trainer: H135
- Transport: Sea King Mk 41; Sea Lynx Mk 88 A

The Marinefliegerkommando (Naval Aviation Command) is the naval air arm of the German Navy. It is aircraft flown by the Navy of Germany, and mostly consists of helicopters and fixed-wing maritime patrol aircraft, as well as types of drones. Naval helicopters can operate from ships, and some of their roles include utility and supply tasks, search and rescue, and ASW or naval warfare. The fixed-wing aircraft operate from land bases but will patrol over open water. The Navy also operates training aircraft and unmanned drones. Naval aviation is subordinate to the German Navy, separate from the German Air Force.

== History ==
During the First World War, naval aviators were part of the Kaiserliche Marine. After the war Germany was no longer allowed to maintain a military aviation capability. Heer and Marine both attempted to nevertheless maintain theoretical and practical knowledge of air warfare through concealed activities such as pilot training efforts. After the National Socialists had risen to power, these activities intensified until Nazi Germany unilaterally declared its withdrawal from armament limitations in 1935. The nascent rump naval air arm was quickly absorbed by Hermann Göring's newly established Luftwaffe.

However, as a component of the air force, the Seeflieger maintained their organisational structure. A carrier-based aviation component was planned for the aircraft carrier Graf Zeppelin, laid down in 1936, but lack of suitable aircraft, coupled with the reluctance of the Luftwaffe to support the Kriegsmarine in the carrier's construction, culminated in its eventual cancellation in 1943.

After the Second World War, it was not until West Germany's entry into NATO in the 1950s and the establishment of the Bundesmarine, that a naval aviation force (Marineflieger) was formed.

The United Kingdom was instrumental in the creation of the Marineflieger, supplying training and aircraft. A number of Royal Navy Fleet Air Arm (FAA) officers operated as part of the German Navy in the process. The first aircraft included Hawker Sea Hawks, which were used by Marinefliegergeschwader 1 and 2, and Fairey Gannets. Until the new bases were ready, pilots were trained with the FAA in the UK.

The first Kommando der Marineflieger was created in July 1956 in Kiel-Holtenau and elevated to divisional level in 1964, renamed to Marinefliegerkommando in 1967 and to Marinefliegerdivision in 1969 as it grew in size. This Naval Aviation Division commanded five wings and several supporting units in total before 1990, including two combat aircraft wings equipped with Lockheed Starfighter fighter aircraft and then the Panavia Tornado. The Fairey Gannet maritime patrol aircraft (MPA) was replaced with the Bréguet Atlantic.

After the Cold War, the unit was renamed to Flotille der Marineflieger in 1994 and reduced to a brigade-level command. Its last combat aircraft were handed over to the German Air Force in 2005 before the flotilla was dissolved on 30 June 2006. Afterwards, the remaining wings were directly assigned to fleet command until 8 October 2012, when the current Marinefliegerkommando was created in Nordholz under Kapitän zur See Andreas Horstmann, who had already been charged with naval aviation at fleet command in Rostock from 2006 to 2009. At the same time the remaining naval aviation aircraft were largely consolidated at Nordholz Naval Airbase.

== Subordinate units ==
Apart from the staff, two—the 3rd and 5th—wings are currently assigned to the unit.

=== Naval Air Wing 3 (MFG 3) "Graf Zeppelin" ===
Emblem of MFG 3

The German Navy's fixed-wing aircraft, namely eight Lockheed P-3C Orion MPA taken over from the Royal Netherlands Navy and two modified Dornier 228LM pollution control aircraft are assigned to the 3rd wing, Marinefliegergeschwader 3 "Graf Zeppelin". The unit is also responsible for handling flight operations in Nordholz. It was established in 1964.

The wings tasks include surveillance and control of large sea areas as well as maritime warfare against targets above (ASuW) and below water (ASW). Pollution control patrols are carried out implementing the MARPOL 73/78 convention on behalf of and in cooperation with German civilian authorities, namely the German coastal states and agencies under the Federal Ministry of Transport, who do not maintain the appropriate aircraft themselves.

The P-3Cs are to be replaced with eight P-8 Poseidon MPAs from 2024 on in order to avoid a looming capability gap caused by bringing forward the out-of-service date of the P-3Cs to 2025. A prior attempt to extensively refurbish the aircraft and extend their service time to 2035 was abandoned due to cost and technical issues.

A technical support group (Gruppe) and a flying group, each with two flights (Staffeln) make up the unit along with an airbase group which is responsible for logistics, command infrastructure and air traffic:

- Staff
  - Flying Group
    - 1st Flight (P-3C)
    - 2nd Flight (P-3C, Do-228LM)
  - Technical Group
    - Technical Flight (P-3C)
    - Technical Flight (general purpose)
  - Air Base Group

=== Naval Air Wing 5 (MFG 5) ===
Emblem of MFG 5

Marinefliegergeschwader 5 commands the navies rotorcraft fleet of Westland Sea Lynx MK 88 A and Sea King Mk 41 helicopters, tasked with ship-based anti-submarine warfare, anti-surface warfare, transport and special forces support duties and is responsible for search and rescue (SAR) duty in the North and Baltic seas. The Sea King fleet is currently transitioning to the NH90 Sea Lion. Sea Lion operations began during June 2020 and the wing will eventually have 20 in service. The NH90 in its Sea Tiger version will also replace the Sea Lynx from 2025 on as the navies frigate-based helicopter.

The unit redeployed in 2012-2013 to Nordholz from Kiel-Holtenau where it had been stationed since its creation in 1958.

- Staff
  - Flying Group
    - 1st Flight (Sea Lynx Mk 88 A)
    - 2nd Flight (Sea King Mk 41)
    - ? Flight (Sea Lion)
    - Instruction Flight
  - Technical Group
    - Technical Flight (Sea Lynx Mk 88 A)
    - Technical Flight (Sea King Mk 41)
    - Technical Flight (Sea Lion)
    - Technical Instruction Flight

== Aircraft ==
The command had 2,500 personnel on active duty in 2020. As of 2025, it operates 47 aircraft.

=== Current fleet ===
Model	Image	Origin	Role	Ordered	Introduced	Operational	Notes
Airplane
Boeing P-8A Poseidon		United States	Maritime patrol	8	2025	3	Selected to replace the P-3C Orion in 2021: 5 ordered in 2021; 3 additional ordered in 2023; First arrived in Germany in October 2025. 4 more might be purchased by 2035.
Dornier 228 LM		Germany	Pollution control	2	1991	2	
Rotorcraft
Westland Sea Lynx Mk 88 A		United Kingdom	ASW, ASuW	26	1981	17	To be replaced by the NH90 NFH Sea Tiger from 2025 to 2030. Equipment: Depth-variable sonar (active and passive detection); Anti-submarine torpedoes Mk46 and MU90 Impact; FN Herstal M3M door mount machine gun12.7×99 mm NATO
NH90 NTH "Sea Lion"		Germany; France; Italy; Netherlands	Multi-role helicopter (utility, SAR, vertical replenishment)	18	2018	18	
NH90 NFH "Sea Tiger"		Germany; France; Italy; Netherlands	Multi-role helicopter (ASW, ASuW, reconnaissance, transport)	31	2025	2	Ordered in 2020, to be delivered from 2025 to 2030. Qualifications trials started in 2023. Equipment: Thales European navy radar (ENR) 360; Safran Euroflir 410NG Electro-Optical System; Improved Electronic Support Measures (ESM); Thales FLASH active dipping sonar; Thales BlueTracker sonobuoy; Armament: MBDA MARTE MK2/S; MU90 Impact anti-submarine torpedoes; On option, NSM (Naval Standard Missile) from Kongsberg; First delivery in December 2025.
UAV
DJI Phantom IV		China	ISR; Intelligence, surveillance, and reconnaissance	5	2017	5	Commercial UAV multicopter
Aerovironment RQ-20B Puma AE II "LARUS"		United States	ISR; Intelligence, surveillance, and reconnaissance	6	2019	6	3 systems with 2 drones each. The systems were ordered in 2018.
Saab Skeldar V-200 "Sea Falcon"		Sweden	ISR; Intelligence, surveillance, and reconnaissance	2	2020	2	Ordered in 2017 as part of an urgent research programme VorMUAS to equip the K130 Braunschweig class 8 additional Sea Falcon are eventually planned.

=== Future fleet ===
Model	Image	Origin	Type	Role	Ordered	Introduction	Notes
UAV
MQ-9B SeaGuardian		United States	UAS	Maritime patrol	8	2028	UAS in support of the P-8 Poseidon. The purchase was approved in December 2025. 8 ordered in January 2026.
VTOL UAV		—	UAV	Reconnaissance and support of frigates and corvettes	22+	By 2035	

=== Contractors ===
Model	Image	Origin	Type	Role	Ordered	Introduction	Notes
AW139		Italy	Multi-role helicopter	Training rotorcraft	—	2025	HeliOperations will train the German Navy helicopter pilots for 7 years in Dorset (UK).
Beechcraft B300 King Air 350			Turboprop	Maritime surveillance	-	before 2025	At least one machine leased from Atlas Air Service, equipped with a surveillance package. Used for EU-missions IRINI and ASPIDES after operational withdrawal of the Lockheed P-3 Orion from oversea missions.

=== Former fleet ===
The Marineflieger previously operated the following aircraft:

- Panavia Tornado
- F-104 G Starfighter
- Hawker Sea Hawk
- Fairey Gannet
- Breguet Atlantic
- Dornier Do 28
- Westland Sea King Mk.41
- Lockheed P-3 Orion

== See also ==
- German Navy:
  - List of active German Navy ships
  - List of active weapons of the German Navy
  - List of ship classes of the Bundesmarine and Deutsche Marine
  - List of ships of the German navies
  - Kommando Spezialkräfte Marine (German Navy special forces)
- German Army:
  - List of modern equipment of the German Army
- German Air Force:
  - List of active equipment of the German Air Force
- German Army equipment pages in German:
  - List of small arms of the Bundeswehr
  - List of Bundeswehr ammunition
  - List of wheeled vehicles of the Bundeswehr
  - List of tracked vehicles of the Bundeswehr
  - List of aircraft of the Bundeswehr
