= Super Sonic Strike Missile (3SM) Tyrfing =

3SM Tyrfing
- Type: Anti-ship missile
- Place of origin: Norway; Germany

Service history
- In service: Planned for 2035 with the German Navy

Production history
- Designer: Kongsberg Defence & Aerospace; Subcontractors: Diehl Defence; MBDA Deutschland GmbH; Nammo
- Designed: 2024 to 2033

Specifications
- Muzzle velocity: Mach 2 to 3
- Effective firing range: 800–1,000 km (500–620 mi)
- Engine: Ramjet THOR-ER derived engine
- Launch platform: Special launch anti-ship missiles containers, or Mk41 VLS

Super Sonic Strike Missile (3SM) Tyrfing is a supersonic anti-ship missile under development by the Norwegian firm Kongsberg Defense & Aerospace (KDA).

The missile is expected to be delivered from 2035 and is planned to be used on Norwegian and German naval vessels. The missile will complement the Naval Strike Missile.

== Name ==
The name Tyrfing originates from Norse mythology, where it was a sword that always hit what it was swung at, could never rust and could cut through stone and iron as easily as through clothing.

== Development ==
In 2021 the Norwegian and German governments declared that a new anti-ship missile would become a collaborative project. The missile was initially called the Future Naval Strike Missile.

In November 2023 the Norwegian Ministry of Defense and KDA proposed that a decision was to be made to initiate the first initial design phase of the project. Germany also plans to consider a decision on commissioning in the new year.

In May 2024 Kongsberg announced they had teamed up with the German partners Diehl Defence and MBDA Deutschland GmbH for development of the missile. In June 2024, the German parliament approved BMVg to invest €650 million for the development of the missile between 2024 and 2033.

=== First phase ===
The contract for the first phase of the development was signed between the Norwegian Defence Materiel Agency (NDMA) and Kongsberg D&A in July 2024 for a value of NOK 1.5 billion (€ 130 million)

== Planned operators ==
Norway

- Royal Norwegian Navy

Germany

- German Navy – planned for:
  - F126 (Niedersachsen class)
  - F127

== See also ==
- Naval Strike Missile – (Norway)
