= HeliOperations =

British helicopter company

- Industry: Helicopter Services
- Founded: 2008
- Headquarters: Isle of Portland, United Kingdom
- Key people: Stephen Gladston (CEO)
- Website: https://helioperations.co

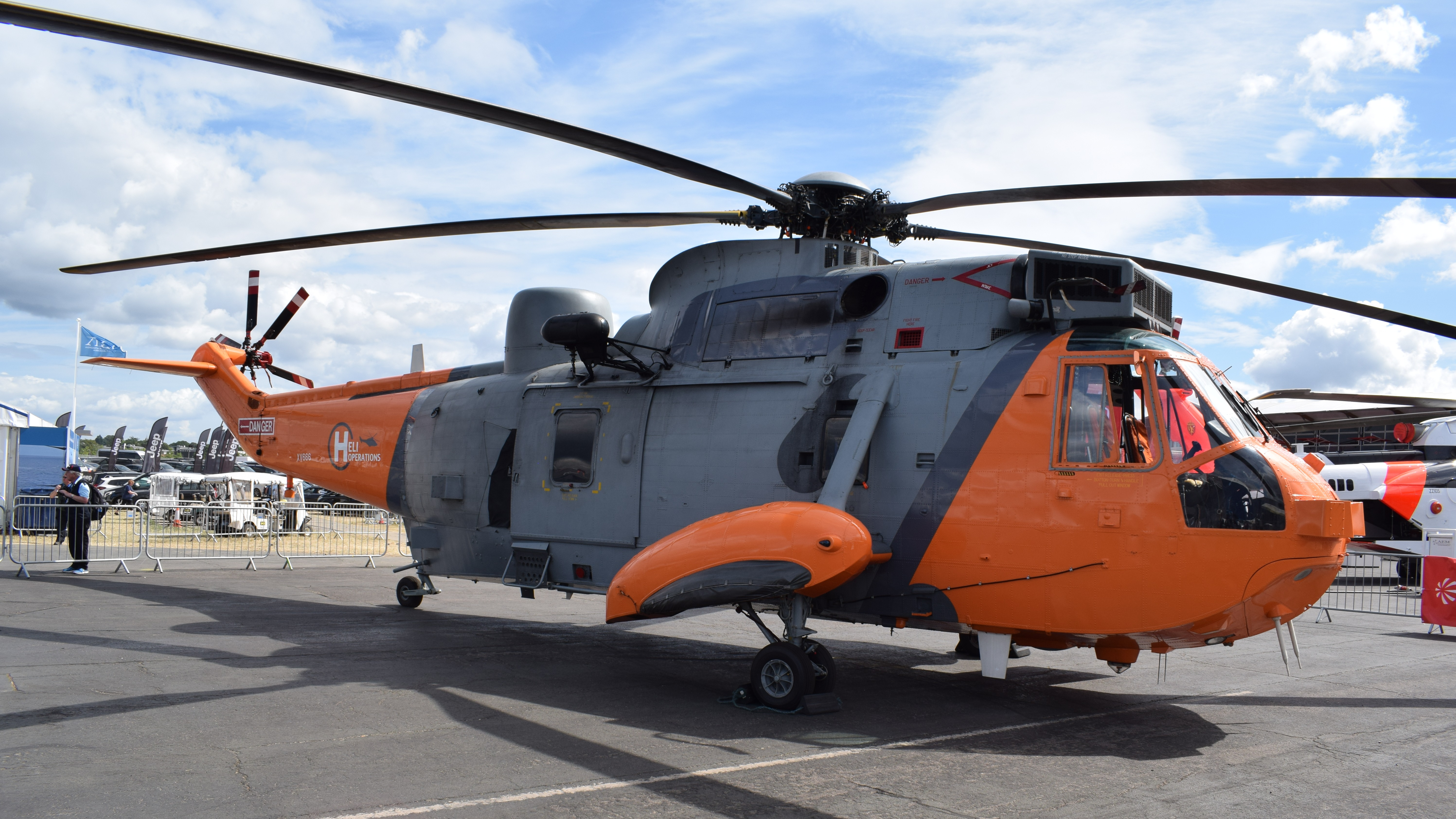
HeliOperations Westland Sea King at Farnborough Air Show in 2018

HeliOperations is a British helicopter company (Note: HeliOperations is a trading name of Developing Assets (UK) Limited) based on the Isle of Portland, Dorset, England, at the old Naval Air Station of RNAS Portland (HMS Osprey). It offers training for aircrew and groundcrew, including live flying training conducted from its own heliport in Portland as well as overseas; in addition, it provides synthetic training at its simulator facility located in Culdrose. Furthermore, it supplies equipment, regulatory assistance, and operational management services to governments, significant aviation operators, and private individuals.

== History ==
From 2017 HeliOperations primarily operated three former Royal Navy Fleet Air Arm Westland Sea King helicopters. Operations took place at the former RNAS Portland (HMS Osprey). The aircraft were owned by the Ministry of Defence, but were leased to the company to provide training services to the German Navy Marineflieger and other private customers. Following the retirement of the helicopters from the Fleet Air Arm, HeliOperations is the last operator of Westland Sea King helicopters in the United Kingdom.

In May 2022, the company acquired an AgustaWestland AW139 SAR helicopter.

In late 2022, two of the companies Sea King helicopters were transferred to the Ukrainian Air Force.

On 8 August 2025, it was announced that HeliOperations has been awarded a five-year contract valued at £41 million. The Fleet Helicopter Support Unit (FHSU) contract will involve HeliOperations providing training support for UK and NATO global operations by delivering two AgustaWestland AW139 helicopters, along with technical support, maintenance, pilots, and crew to Navy Command. These new helicopters will replace a single Dauphin N2. Set to operate from Portland starting in spring 2026, the contract, which has the potential for extension until 2036 and could be worth up to £68 million, will facilitate the transfer of personnel and equipment to warships and vessels at sea, thereby offering maritime rotary wing support to Fleet Operational Standards and Training (FOST).

In summer 2025, HeliOperations began constructing a new hanger on their premises. The construction also includes the installation of a new air traffic control tower and a flight simulator, as well as better facilities for employees and flight crew. The aim is to have the hanger fully complete by 2027.

== Fleet ==
=== Current fleet ===
- 3 x AgustaWestland AW139 (Airframe number G-GSAR, G-ESAR, and G-YSAR)
- 2 x Westland Sea King (Airframe number XV666) and ZA137 - Leased from the Ministry of Defence under CFAOS.

=== Former fleet ===
- 2 x Westland Sea King (Airframe numbers ZA166 and XZ920) - Formerly leased from the Ministry of Defence under CFAOS.

== Locations ==
HeliOperations is currently dispersed across three distinct locations:

- Portland, Dorset, - the former Royal Navy air station is currently used to deliver the training of Search and Rescue (SAR) pilots to the Federal German Navy (FGN).
- RNAS Culdrose (HMS Seahawk), Cornwall, - HeliOperations are the owners and operators of the former Royal Navy Sea King helicopter simulator situated at RNAS Culdrose.
- Somerton, Somerset, - Maintenance & Storage facility in the town of Somerton. The facility encompasses more than 3000 square meters dedicated to maintenance, logistics, and office functions, and it is equipped to accommodate a Merlin sized aircraft.
