= German auxiliary Alster =

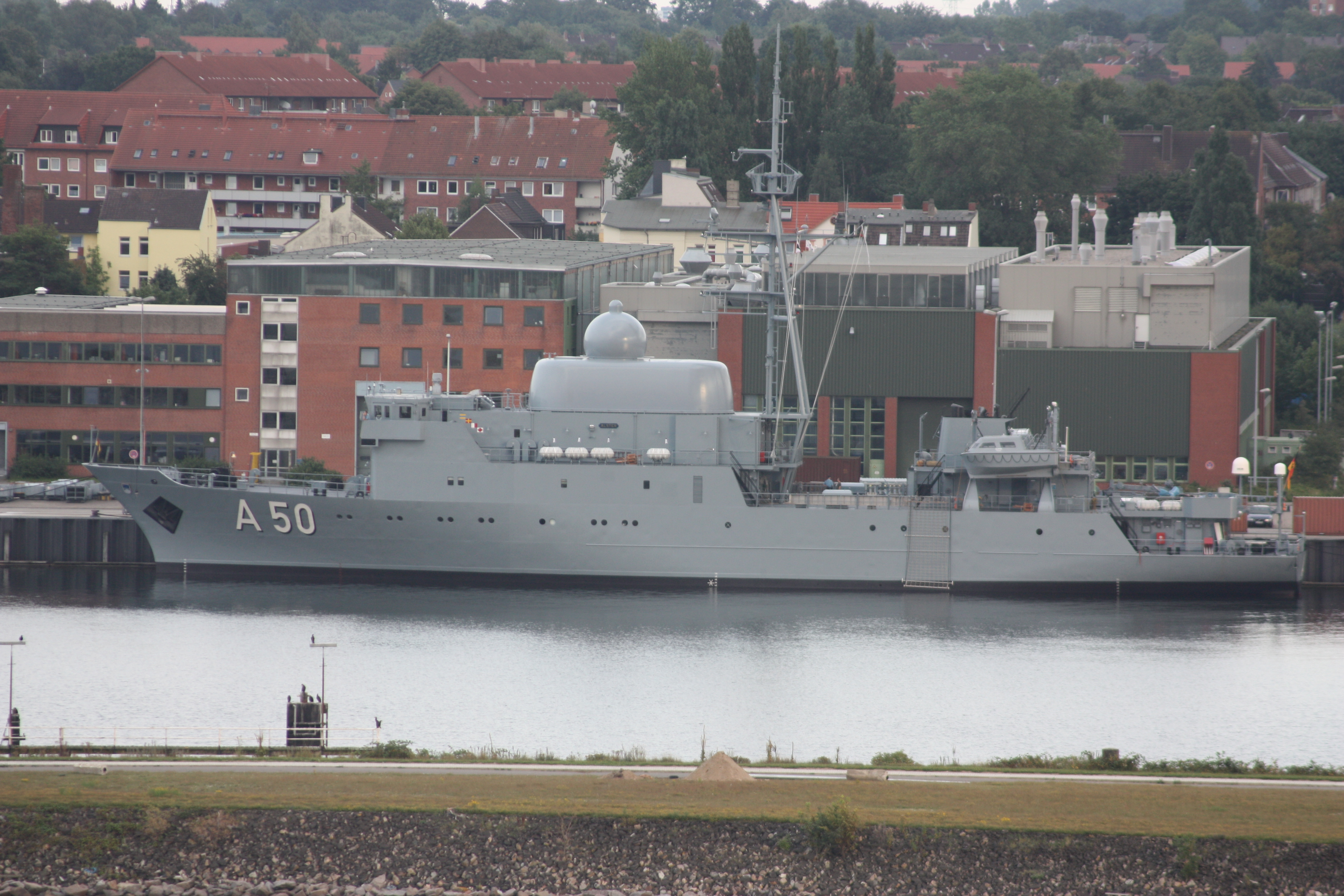
- Alster in Kiel, August 2009.

History

Germany
- Name: Alster
- Namesake: River Alster
- Builder: Flensburger Schiffbau-Gesellschaft, Flensburg
- Laid down: 1987
- Launched: 4 November 1988
- Commissioned: 1988
- Home port: Eckernförde, Schleswig-Holstein
- Identification: MMSI number: 211211450; Callsign: DRHF
- Status: In active service

General characteristics
- Class & type: Oste-class fleet service ship
- Displacement: 3,200 tonnes
- Length: 83.5 m (274 ft)
- Beam: 14.6 m (48 ft)
- Draft: 4.2 m (14 ft)
- Propulsion: 2 diesel engines, 3,300 kW (4,400 hp) each
- Speed: 21 knots (39 km/h)
- Range: More than 5,000 nautical miles (9,300 km)
- Complement: 36 + up to 40 mission specialists
- Sensors & processing systems: ELINT/COMINT sensors
- Electronic warfare & decoys: Electronic countermeasures
- Armament: None

Alster (A 50) is an intelligence ship of the German Navy. She is the lead ship of the German Navy's Type 423. The vessel is named for the river Alster located in Hamburg and Schleswig-Holstein.

== Design ==
Alster is a reconnaissance ship, which was originally intended to gather data on Soviet ships. She has a wide array of modern electromagnetic, hydroacoustic, and electro-optic sensors for strategic intelligence gathering. Her sensitive antennas can identify radar locations, monitor flights, and can also listen in on radio and phone conversations. She can be used as an advance warning unit. Her crew is a mixture of German Navy sailors and German Bundesnachrichtendienst (Federal Intelligence Agency) officers.

== Service history ==
On 26 October 2006, Israeli planes flew over Alster while she was serving with the UNIFIL peacekeeping forces off the coast of Lebanon, stirring an international incident. German authorities declared that the planes had fired shots at the ship and evaded from the scene launching flares. The Israeli side, though denying that firing had occurred, acknowledged the incident and declared that no aggression was meant. Diplomatic activity resulted in a settlement, though none of the parties backed from its position.

Since 26 February 2022 Alster is patroling the eastern part of Baltic sea as a result of the Ukrain-Russian war. It aimed to collect data of Russian activities in the baltic region. In 2026 also sister-ship Oste was send to Fehmarn belt searegion without an AIS tracking to monitor Russian destroyer Severomorsk.
