= German auxiliary Oste =

German naval vessel

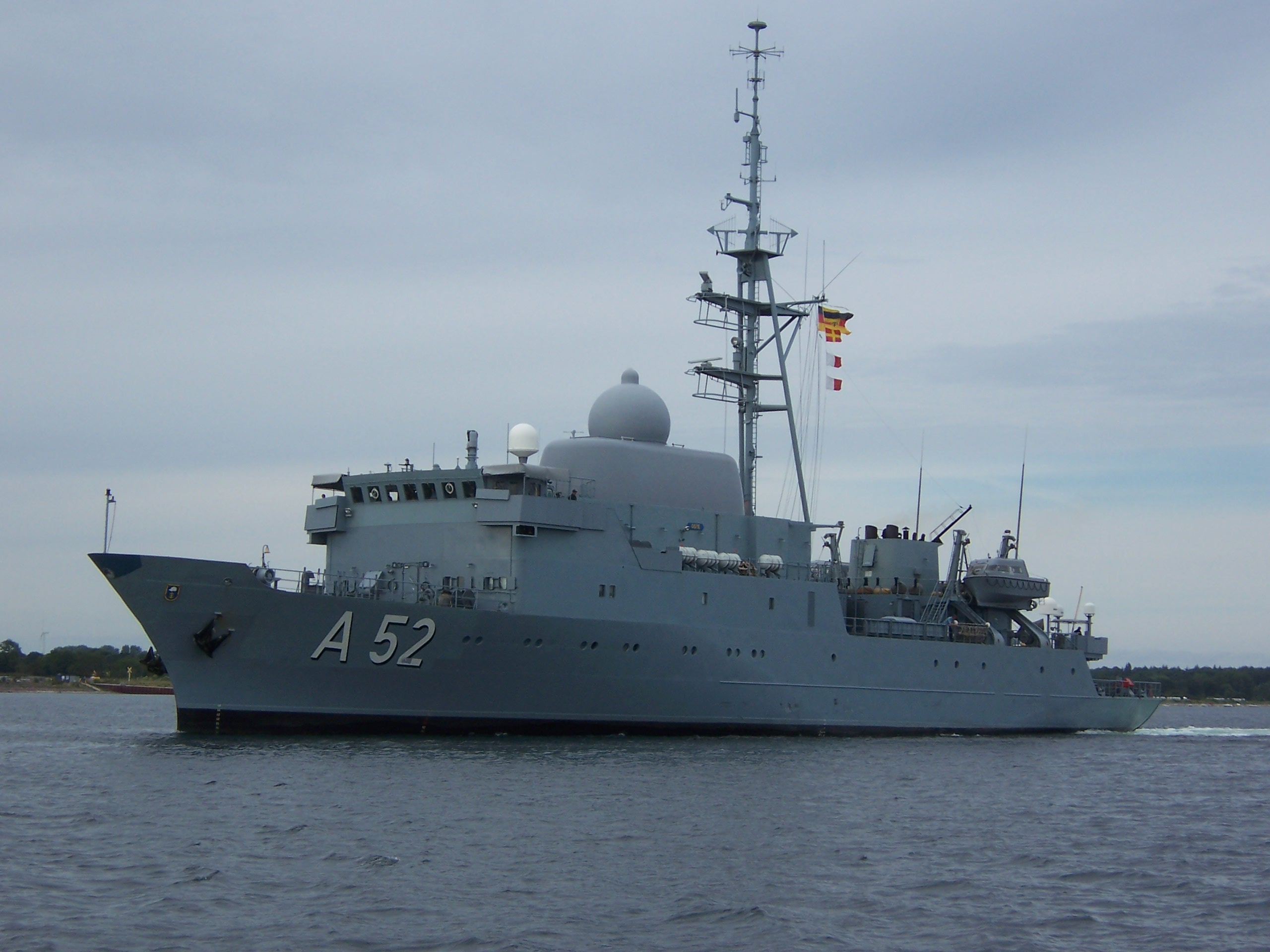
- Oste in Eckernförde, June 2017.

History

Germany
- Name: Oste
- Namesake: River Oste
- Builder: Flensburger Schiffbau-Gesellschaft, Flensburg
- Launched: 30 June 1988
- Commissioned: 30 July 1988
- Home port: Eckernförde, Schleswig-Holstein
- Identification: MMSI number: 211211470; Callsign: DRHH

General characteristics
- Class & type: Oste-class fleet service ship
- Displacement: 3,200 tonnes
- Length: 83.5 m (274 ft)
- Beam: 14.6 m (48 ft)
- Draft: 4.2–6.4 m (14–21 ft)
- Propulsion: 2 diesel engines, 3,300 kW (4,400 hp) each
- Speed: 20 knots (37 km/h)
- Range: More than 5,000 nautical miles (9,300 km)
- Complement: 48 + up to 39 mission specialists
- Sensors & processing systems: ELINT/COMINT sensors

Oste (A 52) is a fleet service ship of the Germany Navy in the Oste class. It is named after the river Oste which flows throughout northern Lower Saxony.

In 2021, it was approved by the Bundestag, that three new ships would be contracted by Lürssen to be in service by 2027, replacing the class 423.

== Service history ==
During the Balkan crisis and the Kosovo War in the 1990s, the Oste-class fleet service vessels were deployed in the Mediterranean and Adriatic Seas to collect vital radio and radar data for NATO forces; Oste was among the vessels involved.

Amidst international tensions in the Middle East, the Oste repeatedly conducted missions in the Eastern Mediterranean off the coasts of Syria and Lebanon up from 2010. These operations focused on gathering intelligence in the context of the Syrian Civil War and in support of the UNIFIL mission off the Lebanese coast.

Later Oste was active in Indian Ocean and at the Horn of Africa to support anti-piracy missions of EU and German Navy.

In 2026 also sister-ship Oste was send to Fehmarn belt searegion without an AIS tracking to monitor Russian destroyer Severomorsk.
