= Type 424 fleet service ship =

German Navy signals and recon ship class

Type 424
Class overview
- Builders: NVL Group
- Operators: German Navy
- Preceded by: Oste class
- Cost: €3.3 billion (2023) (equivalent to €3.4 billion in 2025) for 3 ships + training centre
- Planned: 3
- Building: 3

General characteristics
- Type: Signals intelligence gathering vessel
- Length: 132 m (433 ft 1 in)
- Complement: 50 sailors (ship operation); + 50 operators (electronic reconnaissance soldiers)
- Sensors & processing systems: Antennas; Rohde & Schwarz ADD-557 for geo-location of communications and radar emitters (20 MHz to 8 GHz)
- Electronic warfare & decoys: ELINT: Rohde & Schwarz Kora ESM (waveband 2 GHz to 40 GHz); COMINT: Supplied by PLATH GmbH

The Type 424 fleet service ship is a new class of three signals intelligence (SIGINT/ELINT) and reconnaissance ships for the German Navy. Officially designated as "fleet service ships", they will replace the three Oste class shipsw, which has been in service since the late 1980s.

== History ==
The Type 424 was first announced in June 2021 when a contract was awarded to the NVL Group for the design phase. Bundestag approved the development and procurement of three auxiliary ships as well as a training and reference reconnaissance facility (ARAA) for sea-based signal detection reconnaissance (ssA).

As the main contractor, NVL was commissioned to develop the systems by February 2023. All services should be completed by 2029. The first of the three boats is scheduled to be put into service in 2027.

When concluding the contract with Naval Vessels Lürssen (NVL) in June 2021, the Federal court of Audit, Bundesrechnungshof reported “significant concerns”. It criticized the fact that the Ministry of Defense only wanted to discuss with the shipyard after the contract had been signed how exactly the ships should be built. "Billions were awarded blindly and a very bad negotiating situation," wrote the Süddeutsche Zeitung. The Federal Audit Office feared "additional expenditure in the medium term."

In 2023, the ships only existed vaguely and sketchily on paper.The new building increased in price from 2.1 billion euros to 3.3 billion euros (2023). The Federal cort of Audit, Bundesrechnungshof intervened in 2023 and stated that there were significant risks arising from the contract structure with Lürssen.

In 2023 BAAINBw and Lürssen announced that delivery will be postponed to a period between 2029 and 2031.

The construction of the first ship started in November 2024.

In September 2026, Germany mentioned the possibility of purchasing a fourth ship.

== Ships in class ==
| Name | No. | Builder | Status | Contract | Steel cutting | Laid down | Launched | Comm. | Notes |
Deutsche Marine (3 ordered)
| TBA | — | NVL Group: Lürssen Werft, Bremen (aft hull + hull joining); Peene-Werft, Wolgast (forewing hull); Blohm & Voss, Hamburg (fitting out) | In construction | Design: 23 Jun 2021 Build: 8 Jul 2023 | 21 Nov 2024 | Feb 2025 | — | 2029 | |
| TBA | — | NVL Group: Lürssen Werft, Bremen (aft hull + hull joining); Peene-Werft, Wolgast (forewing hull); Blohm & Voss, Hamburg (fitting out) | In construction | Design: 23 Jun 2021 Build: 8 Jul 2023 | 5 Sep 2025 | Nov 2025 | — | 2030 | |
| TBA | — | NVL Group: Lürssen Werft, Bremen (aft hull + hull joining); Peene-Werft, Wolgast (forewing hull); Blohm & Voss, Hamburg (fitting out) | — | Design: 23 Jun 2021 Build: 8 Jul 2023 | 16 Apr 2026 | 14 Sep 2026 | — | 2031 | |

Planned commissioning
