= MEKO A-200 DEU-class frigate =

Future class of Frigate

Class overview
- Name: MEKO A-200 DEU
- Builders: TKMS; Stahlbau Nord GmbH shipyard
- Operators: German Navy (planned)
- Preceded by: Brandenburg class
- Subclasses: MEKO 200 (parent)
- Cost: €1.66 billion per ship (€6.63 billion, 4 ships); €1.33 billion per ship (€5.3 billion, 4 ships in option)
- In service: Planned for 2029
- Planned: 8
- Building: 1

General characteristics
- Type: Anti-submarine frigate
- Displacement: 3,950 tonnes
- Length: 121 m (397 ft 0 in)
- Beam: 16.4 m (53 ft 10 in)
- Draft: 4.4 m (14 ft 5 in)
- Propulsion: CODAG-WARP: 1 × gas-turbine engine (20 MW (27,000 hp)) with a pumpjet (centerline); 2 × diesel engine with 2 × refined propellers (low noise, variable-pitch) (6 MW (8,000 hp))
- Speed: ≤ 29 kn (54 km/h; 33 mph)
- Range: 6,500 nmi (12,000 km)
- Complement: 125 (core crew) + 49 additional personnel
- Sensors & processing systems: Combat systems: Saab 9LV combat management system; Sonars: Atlas Elektronik variable depth towed sonar; Hull sonar to be selected; Radars: Saab composite superstructure with: Sea Giraffe 4A FF (4 × fixed faces) (S-band (IEEE), 3D, AESA, GaN, naval, multifunction, long range surveillance radar); Sea Giraffe 1X (X-band (IEEE), 3D, AESA, GaN, sea and air surveillance, medium range self-defence radar); 2 × Saab CEROS 200 radar and optronic tracking fire control director; To be selected; Communications: To be selected; Navigation: To be selected
- Electronic warfare & decoys: ESM: Saab R-ESM; ECM: 2 × Rafael DIGITAL SHARK R-ECM; Countermeasures: 4 × Rheinmetall MASS; 4 × 4 Lacroix CANTO anti-torpedo countermeasures
- Armament: ASW lightweight torpedoes: MU90; Anti-air missiles: 2 × 8 Mk41 VLS planned for 64 × RIM-162 ESSM Block 2; 1 × Mk 49 GMLS with 21 × RIM-116 RAM; Anti-ship missiles: 4 × 4 side-launchers for the NSM; Naval Guns: 1 × OTO 76/62 SR; 3 × MSI-DS Seahawk DS30M A2 (12 ordered); Small arms: 2 × RCWS
- Aircraft carried: NH90 Sea Tiger (ASW) /; NH90 Sea Lion (SAR / transport); UMS Skeldar V-200
- Aviation facilities: Aircraft hangar with 1 NH90 or 2 lighter helicopters, and UAVs (note: the hangar can be shared with 2 TEU-sized mission modules)
- Notes: Stealth hull shape (X-shape) with a reduced infrared signature

The MEKO A-200 DEU class program (also known as the F128) is a planned class of frigates ordered by the German Navy.

The program is based on the TKMS MEKO A-200 DEU anti-submarine frigate design, which replaces the 2026 cancelled F126 frigate program. Germany has approved an initial batch of four F128 frigates for roughly €6.3 billion, with an option for four additional ships valued at €5.3 billion. The frigates are being built by TKMS and Stahlbau Nord GmbH (Rönner-Group).

The first ship is planned to be in service in 2029

== History ==
=== Background ===
The Niedersachsen-class frigate (F126 / MKS180) was designed as a successor to the Brandenburg-class frigate (F123), and was intended to be used as a multi-role frigate with a focus on the anti-submarine warfare mission. In June 2020, the BAAINBw signed a contract with Damen for the design and the construction of four F126 ships. The contract was later extended to six ships, and with an entry in service in 2028.

By early 2026, the project was being delayed by problems with software compatibility between Damen (the designer and general contractor) and the shipyards (Blohm + Voss in Hamburg, and Peene-shipyard in Wolgast).

The F126 programme was officially cancelled in June 2026.

=== Development ===
The German government and the German parliament prepared an interim solution that came into fruition in February 2026, when the BAAINBw signed a preliminary agreement with TKMS for the preparation of the development of the project. In February 2026, the objective is to deliver the first frigate in 2029. As part of the agreement, there is a budget of €50 million that cover initial procurement and work on the project, but no production contract was signed yet.

In March 2026, the Budget Committee of the Bundestag approved a budget increase to €240 million for this early acquisition of materials and project work for four F128 MEKO A-200 DEU.

In June 2026, the Bundeswehr officially announced that the F126 Niedersachsen-class frigate program was cancelled and that four F128 would be acquired, with a potential for four additional F128 to be purchased.

In July 2026, the Bundestag’s Budget Committee approved the procurement of four ships under strict conditions. And the purchase of four additional ships was approved in October 2026.

== Design ==
The design has been initiated in February 2026, without details on the technical choices.

On 16 July 2026, Saab signed a contract with TKMS, valued at approximately SEK 8.7 billion, to equip the first 4 frigates. Under the agreement, scheduled for delivery between 2029 and 2032.

Saab will provide and integrate composite superstructures, 9LV Naval Combat Management Systems, and advanced sensor arrays to enhance the fleet's warfare capabilities. The Sea Giraffe 4A FF radar is used both for long-range air surveillance and surface target surveillance, with a full horizon coverage.

German Atlas Elektronik is delivering a variable-depth towed sonar. Rheinmetall Defence is delivering Naval guns SeaSnake 30 and Norwegian Kongsberg a set of Naval Strike Missiles.

== Operators ==
=== Future operators ===
The ship is being designed to answer the needs of the German Navy. As of March 2026, no other nation has shown interest in this specific variant of the MEKO family.

== Ships ==
No.	Name	Builder	Status	Contract	Steel cutting	Laid down	Launched	Comm.	Notes
German Navy - 8 ordered
TBA	TBA	Stahlbau Nord GmbH shipyard, Bremerhaven, Germany (steel construction); TKMS (fitting out)	In construction	3 Feb 2026	Feb 2026	May 2026	-	Dec 2029	
TBA	TBA	Stahlbau Nord GmbH shipyard, Bremerhaven, Germany (steel construction); TKMS (fitting out)	On order	3 Feb 2026	-	-	-	Sep 2030	
TBA	TBA	Stahlbau Nord GmbH shipyard, Bremerhaven, Germany (steel construction); TKMS (fitting out)	On order	3 Feb 2026	-	-	-	Jun 2031	
TBA	TBA	Stahlbau Nord GmbH shipyard, Bremerhaven, Germany (steel construction); TKMS (fitting out)	On order	3 Feb 2026	-	-	-	Mar 2032	
TBA	TBA	Stahlbau Nord GmbH shipyard, Bremerhaven, Germany (steel construction); TKMS (fitting out)	On order	17 Nov 2026	-	-	-	Dec 2032	
TBA	TBA	Stahlbau Nord GmbH shipyard, Bremerhaven, Germany (steel construction); TKMS (fitting out)	On order	17 Nov 2026	-	-	-	Sep 2033	
TBA	TBA	Stahlbau Nord GmbH shipyard, Bremerhaven, Germany (steel construction); TKMS (fitting out)	On order	17 Nov 2026	-	-	-	Jun 2034	
TBA	TBA	Stahlbau Nord GmbH shipyard, Bremerhaven, Germany (steel construction); TKMS (fitting out)	On order	17 Nov 2026	-	-	-	Mar 2035	

Planned dates
