= Oste-class fleet service ship =

Class of German fleet service ships

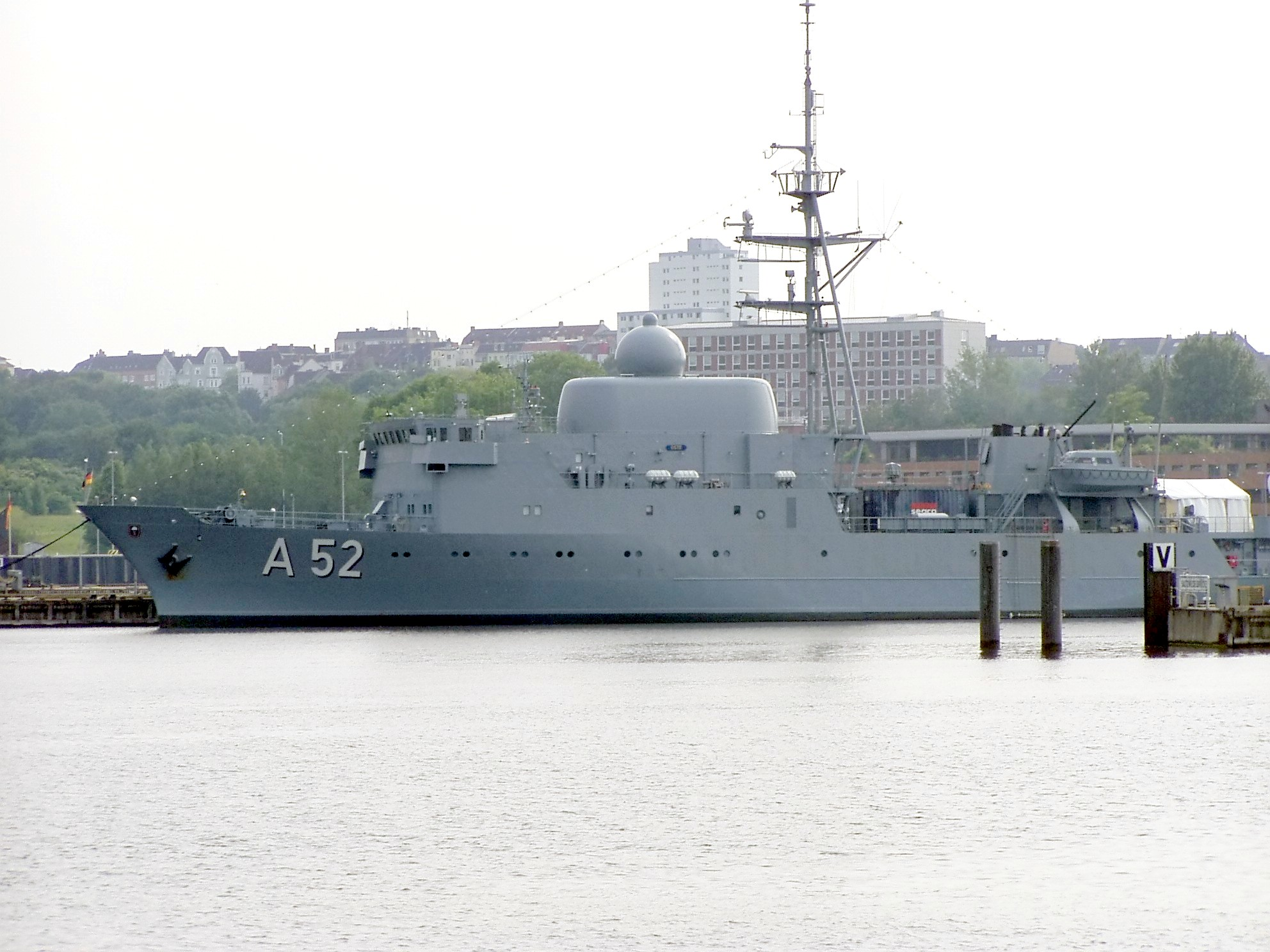
- Oste in 2006

Class overview
- Builders: Flensburger Schiffbau-Gesellschaft, Flensburg
- Operators: German Navy
- Preceded by: Type 422
- Succeeded by: Type 424
- In commission: 1988–present
- Completed: 3
- Active: 3

General characteristics
- Displacement: 3,200 t (3,100 long tons)
- Length: 83.5 m (273 ft 11 in)
- Beam: 14.6 m (47 ft 11 in)
- Draught: 4.2 m (13 ft 9 in)
- Propulsion: 2 diesel engines, 3,300 kW (4,400 hp) each
- Speed: 21 knots (39 km/h)
- Range: More than 5,000 nautical miles (9,300 km)
- Complement: 36 + up to 40 mission specialists
- Sensors & processing systems: ELINT/COMINT sensors
- Electronic warfare & decoys: Electronic countermeasures

The Type 423 Oste class are purpose built signals intelligence (SIGINT/ELINT) and reconnaissance ships of the German Navy. Officially designated as "fleet service ships", they replaced the Type 422 class and will be replaced by Type 424.

The Oste-class ships were designed as reconnaissance units during the Cold War. From the 1990s, the tasks were expanded to early warning and telecommunications reconnaissance in cooperation with other units of German and international armed forces. Civil officers of BND are working on the ships on a regular basis.

The ships are set to be replaced from 2029-2031 when the new Type 424 is planned to come into service. The three new ships will cost €3.3 billion (2023).

== List of ships ==
Ship	Pennant number	Launched	Commissioned	Status
Oste	A52	30 June 1988	30 July 1988	In service
Oker	A53		10 November 1988	In service
Alster	A50	14 November 1988	5 October 1989	In service

== Construction ==
The ships were built at Flensburger Schiffbau-Gesellschaft in Flensburg. All ships are currently based in Eckernförde and belong to the 1st Ubootgeschwader (1st Submarine Squadron) stationed in Eckernförde. The vessels received the same name and pennant numbers as the three Type 422 vessels they replaced. To avoid confusion, the ship names are sometimes suffixed with "II".

Accommodation for the crew was designed to meet civil standards, and the Oste class offers much more comfort for the crew than other ships in the German Navy.

== Service history ==
During the Balkan crisis and the Kosovo War in the 1990s, the Oste-class fleet service vessels were deployed in the Mediterranean and Adriatic Seas to collect vital radio and radar data for NATO forces.

By the early 2010s, the German Navy kept a rotative presence of its three Type 423 vessels for both supporting UNIFIL peacekeeping mission in Lebanon and gathering intelligence about the situation in Syria during the civil war. Oker was reportedly spotted near the Syrian coast in August 2012; early in that year, she had a near-collision with a Syrian Navy patrol boat. Later Oker was seen at Greenwich, United Kingdom, in February 2017.

Later Oste-class ships were active in the Indian Ocean and at the Horn of Africa to support anti-piracy missions of EU and German Navy.

Since 26 February 2022 Alster is patroling the eastern part of Baltic sea as a result of the Ukrain-Russian war. It aimed to collect data of Russian activities in the baltic region. In 2026 also sister-ship Oste was send to Fehmarn belt searegion without an AIS tracking to monitor Russian destroyer Severomorsk.

== Replacement ==
In June 2021, the Bundestag approved the development and procurement of three fleet service boats as well as a training and reference reconnaissance facility (ARAA) for sea-based signal detection reconnaissance (ssA). As the main contractor, Lürssen was commissioned to develop the systems by February 2023. All services should be completed by 2029. The first of the three boats is scheduled to be put into service in 2027 and will mark the replacement of the fleet service boats Oker, Alster and Oste, which have been in use for over 30 years.

The new building increased in price from 2.1 billion euros to 3.3 billion euros (2023).

Ship	Pennant number	Keeled	Price by 2025	Commissioned	Status
Oker	n.n.	25 February 2025	€1,08 billion	planned in 2029	in build
Isar	n.n.	19 November 2025	€1,08 billion	planned in 2029	in build
Saale	n.n.	14 September 2026	€1,08 billion	planned in 2029	in build

== Bibliography ==
- "Flottendienstboot OSTE-Klasse" (in German). Deutsche Marine.
