= Type F127 frigate =

German naval frigate

Class overview
- Name: F127 - MEKO A-400 AMD
- Builders: TKMS; NVL
- Operators: German Navy
- Preceded by: Sachsen class
- In service: Planned for around 2034
- Planned: Initially: 5 planned with 1 option, as of September 2025: 8 planned

General characteristics
- Type: Frigate/destroyer
- Displacement: 12,000 tonnes
- Length: 178 m (584 ft 0 in)
- Beam: 24 m (78 ft 9 in)
- Draught: 7.8 m (25 ft 7 in)
- Ice class: ICE 1C/E1
- Speed: 32 kn (59 km/h; 37 mph)
- Range: 4,000 nmi (7,400 km; 4,600 mi)
- Endurance: 30 days
- Sensors & processing systems: Combat systems; Lockheed Martin Canada CMS330 - Germanised (used for ASW, EW, ASuW, light guns, lasers and their sensors); Air-defence combat system: AEGIS Integrated Combat System (Mk6); Sonars: Atlas Elektronik towed sonar; Atlas Elektronik bow sonar; Radars: 4 × Raytheon AN/SPY-6 (V)1 (3D AESA radars with GaN TRM modules); Hensoldt Spexer-2000 (for naval guns and lasers); Potential 4 × X-band (IEEE) AESA radars modules; Electro-optical sensors: To be selected; Communications: To be selected; Navigation: To be selected
- Armament: Missiles: 96-cell Mk 41 VLS for air defence missiles and land-attack missiles (64 cells in the bow, 32 amidship); Tomahawk cruise missile; SM-6 Block I (RIM-174A); SM-2 Block IIIC (RIM-66P); ESSM Block II (RIM-162B); HYDEF; 2 × 21-cell Mk 49 Mod. 5 GMLS launchers with RIM-116 missiles; Anti-ship missiles: 2 × 4-cell Kongsberg NSM Block 1a cruise missiles (ASM / LAM); 2 × 4-cell Kongsberg 3SM Tyrfing (successor of the NSM); Torpedoes: SeaSpider anti-torpedo torpedo; 2 × 3 MU90 Impact; Directed-energy weapon: 100 kW laser; Naval Guns: 1 × BAE MK45 Mod. 4; 2 × 30mm MK 38 Mod. 4 naval light guns; Machine guns; To be selected
- Aircraft carried: 2 × NH90 Sea Tiger (ASW / ASuW)
- Aviation facilities: Aircraft hangar for 2 helicopters and UAV

The Type F127 frigate is an ongoing procurement programme of the German Navy for the timely replacement of the previous three frigates of the Type F124 Sachsen class.

== History ==
Originally, a cooperation with the Royal Netherlands Navy was planned under the programme Future Air Defender, with a letter of intent for a common ship design, radars, command systems and deployment systems signed on 17 December 2020. The joint cooperation was later cancelled as the requirement and timelines of both navies diverged.

The programme, is now known under the working name of "Projekt Next Generation Frigate – Air Defence" (NGFrig-AD) was initiated by the BMVg in 2018 and is currently in the analysis phase 2 under the leadership of the BAAINBw (Federal Office of Bundeswehr Equipment, Information Technology and In-Service Support). A selection decision by the Inspector General of the Bundeswehr is scheduled for the beginning of 2025.

The plans currently call for six ships which are to arrive from 2033/34, which requires a construction contract and the procurement of the relevant operational systems by 2026 at the latest.

On 2 September 2024, the Federal Cartel Office approved the formation of a joint venture between TKMS) and NVL. The project company intends to jointly apply for the design and construction of 5 ships (+1 option) of the F127. The BAAINBw intends to award the contract in mid-2025.

The ship design is expected to be the MEKO A-400AMD.

On 18 December 2025, it was reported that the capacity was to be expanded to 96 VLS cells. In this context, questions arose as to whether the classification of this class of ship as a frigate still applied, or whether it was already a destroyer design.

== Requirements ==
The main mission of the F127 will be to protect an operational group or area against threats from the air (Air-and-Missile-Defence (AMD)), including in the future against ballistic missiles and hypersonic glide vehicles. The ships of the F127 class are intended to be able to integrate into the effective network of ground and air-based air defence and also make a contribution to territorial missile defence for homeland security.

In addition to their primary task of air defense, the frigates will also be capable of conducting surface and underwater naval warfare, long-range combat against land targets and operating in cyber and information space.

== Ship design ==
=== Preliminary expectations ===
The design of the ship will be determined primarily by the weapon systems and missile launch systems and the extensive sensor technology. In terms of size and capabilities, the F127 will be comparable to the Arleigh Burke class (FLT III).

==== Dimensions ====
In terms of dimensions, it will likely reach over 12,000 tonnes.

==== Systems ====
The combat system is known in the German Navy as the FüWES-M (Standardisierung maritimer Führungs- und Waffeneinsatzsysteme). The budget to develop the system was approved in November 2025. A total of €250 million is budgeted, with a first phase of €90 million expected. This contract is expected to extend until 2029. The budget includes licenses, the training, and the integration of additional sensors.

The combat management system will be a Canadian variant of the Aegis system, which is an ITAR-Free system. The agreement between the German and the Canadian government was signed the 14 November 2025. The variant will be the Lockheed Martin Canada's CMS 330 tactical interface, a derivative of the system used on the Canadian River-class destroyers. Hensoldt, after the acquisition of ESG is expected to perform the integration.

Notes:

- Rheinmetall made an offer to counter the one made by Lockheed Martin Canada.
- The system is expected to be installed on all surface ship of the German Navy (long-term project).

==== Sensors ====
For the radar, the RTX AN/SPY-6(V)1 was selected in October 2025. Each ship will be equipped with four planar arrays, providing a 360° situational awareness. Each of those arrays are made of 37 modules.

== Operators ==
=== Future operators ===
Germany
The initiation of the purchase of some equipment and design works for the ships was approved in December 2024. At least four, up to eight ships are expected.
