= Ensdorf-class minesweeper =

Type of minesweeper

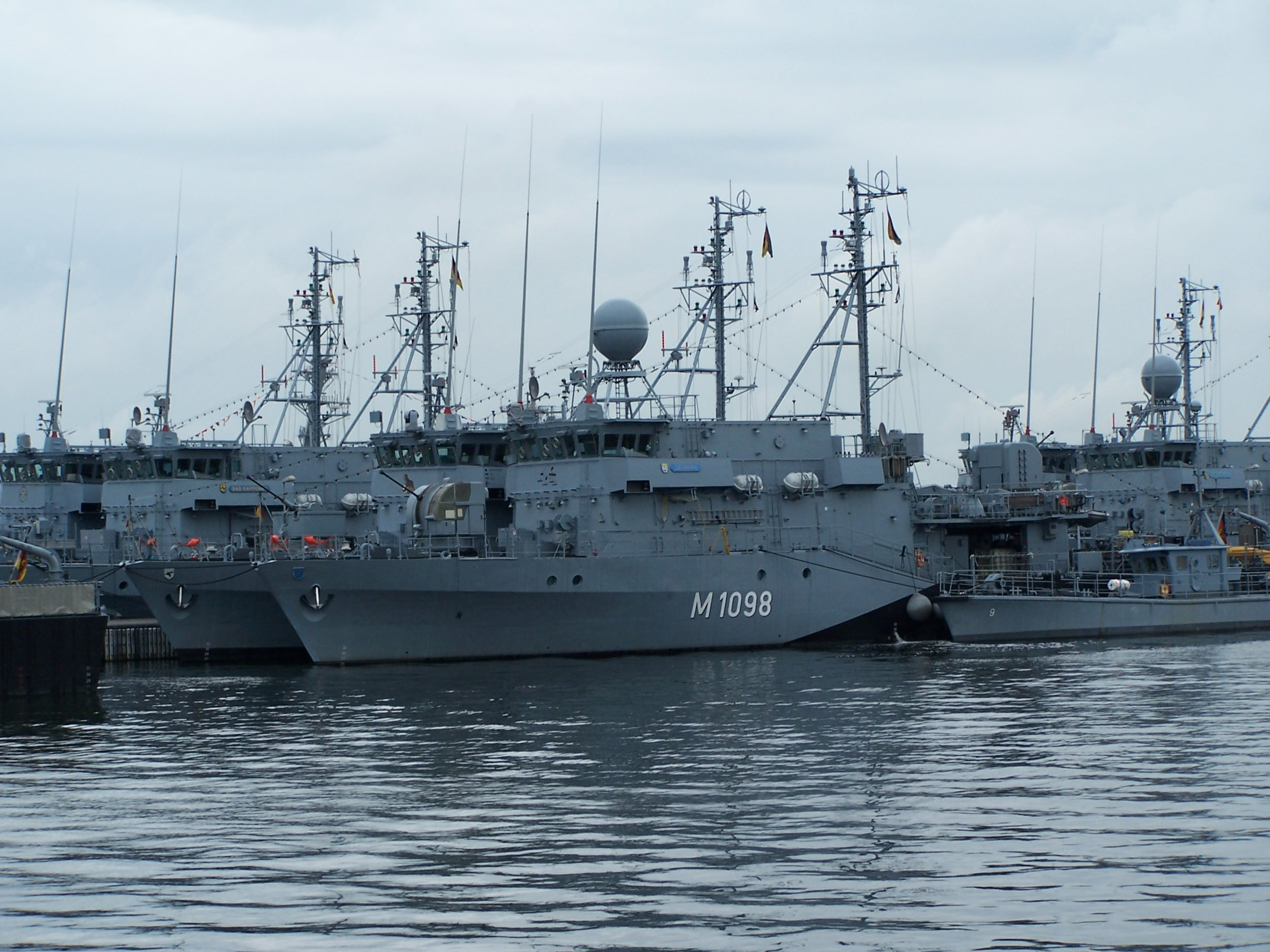
- M1098 Siegburg, at the Kiel Week 2007

Class overview
- Name: Type 352 Ensdorf class
- Builders: Lürssen; Abeking & Rasmussen
- Operators: German Navy
- Preceded by: Hameln class
- Built: 1999-2001
- Completed: 5
- Laid up: 5

General characteristics
- Type: Minesweeper
- Displacement: 650 tonnes
- Length: 54.40 m (178.5 ft)
- Beam: 9.20 m (30.2 ft)
- Draft: 2.84 m (9 ft 4 in)
- Propulsion: 2 × MTU 16V 538 TB91 diesel engines, 2240 kW each; 2 × Renk PLS 25 gearboxes; 2 × propeller shafts driving controllable pitch propellers
- Speed: 18 knots (33 km/h; 21 mph)
- Complement: 45
- Sensors & processing systems: Navigation radar; Hull-mounted DSQS-11 mine-detection sonar
- Armament: 2 × Bofors 40mm/L70 dual-purpose gun (to be upgraded to 2 Mauser MLG27 27 mm remote-controlled autocannons); FIM-92 Stinger surface-to-air missiles (MANPADS); Mine-laying capabilities (60 mines)

Type 352 Ensdorf-class minesweepers are a class of five minesweepers of the German Navy. They are Type 343 Hameln-class minesweepers that have been upgraded with the Troika Plus system of minesweeping drones

== Design ==
The Ensdorf class have three modes to clear mine fields:

- Troika Plus: This system employs up to four remote controlled Seehund ("seal") drones which perform the sweep. The drones are small unmanned boats that can simulate the acoustic and magnetic signatures of bigger ships to trigger mines. Their small size and special construction let them survive the effects of exploding mines unharmed.
- Mine hunting: Mines detected with the hull-mounted sonar can be identified and exploded with expendable Seefuchs (Seafox) ROVs.
- Classical minesweeping: Against moored mines the classical minesweeping using towed wire cutters to cut the anchors of mines can be conducted.

The Ensdorf class replaced the Type 351 Lindau-class minesweepers in service with the German Navy.

=== Seehund ===
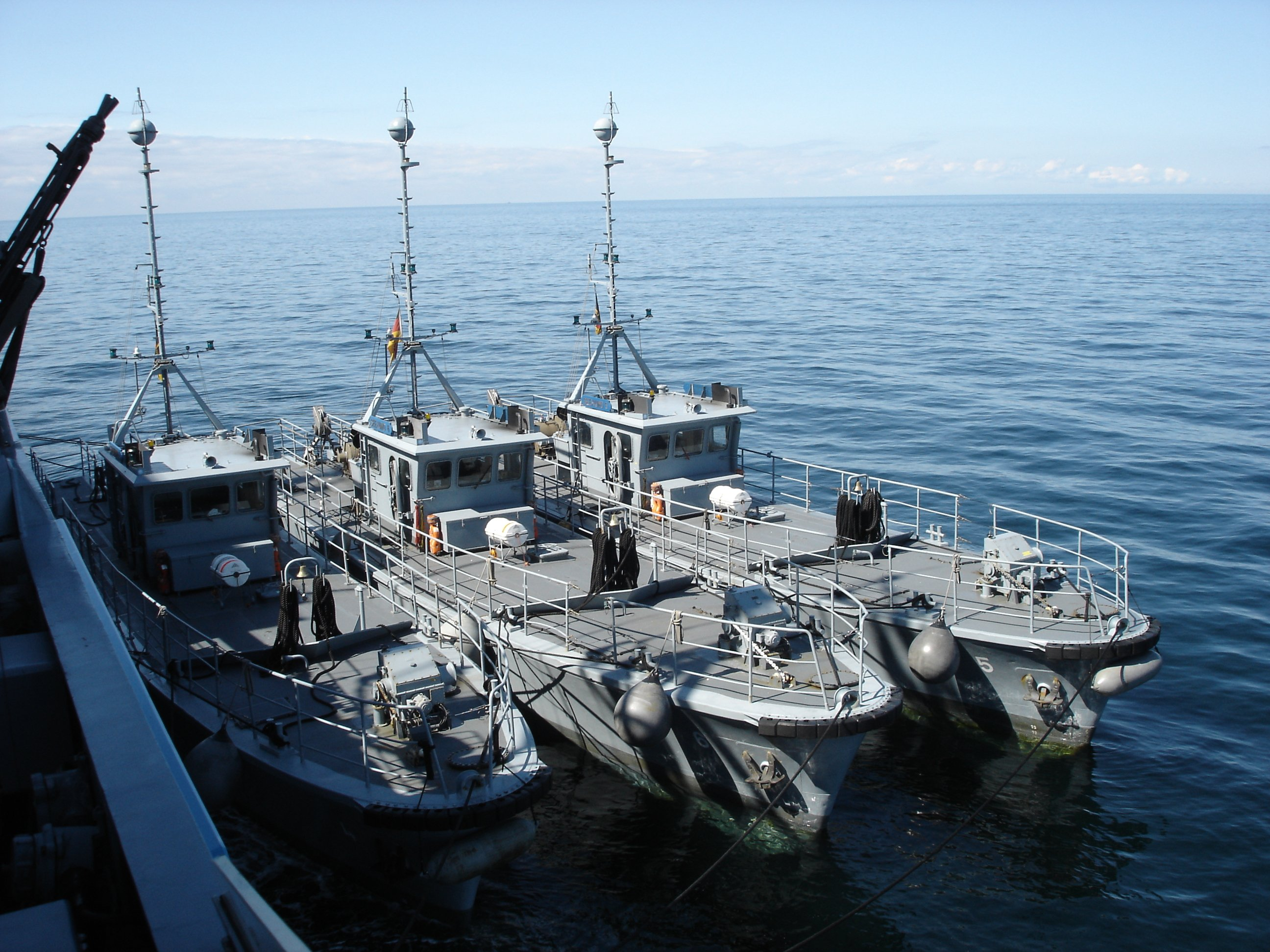
Three Seehund ROVs

The Seehund unmanned surface vehicles can be controlled remotely or manually by an onboard crew (usually three) for maneuvering in harbours or in training (the Seehund is too large to be carried by Ensdorf-class vessels). A life raft is carried for this reason. Seehunds are 25 m (82 ft) long with a displacement of 99 t. They are propelled by a Schottel Z-drive which gives them a maximum speed of 9–10 kn (17–19 km/h; 10–12 mph).

== Ship list ==
Pennant number	Name	Call sign	Commissioned	Decommissioned
M1094	Ensdorf	DRFN	16 October 1990	31 July 2014
M1093	Auerbach/Oberpfalz	DRFR	7 May 1991	17 December 2015
M1092	Hameln	DRFO	29 June 1989	11 December 2014
M1090	Pegnitz	DRFT	8 March 1990	
M1098	Siegburg	DRFL	26 July 1990	

=== Notes ===
- The ships were not decommissioned for their rebuilding to Type 352, so the listed dates are the ones of their commission as Type 343.
- Auerbach/Oberpfalz is one single name.
- The ships currently belong to the 5. Minensuchgeschwader (5th Mine Sweeping Squadron) based in Kiel at the Baltic Sea.

=== ROVs ===
Number	Commissioned	Mothership
1	5 May 1981	M1092 Hameln
2	5 May 1981	M1092 Hameln
3	5 May 1981	M1092 Hameln
4	4 March 1982	M1093 Auerbach/Oberpfalz
5	4 March 1982	M1093 Auerbach/Oberpfalz
6	4 March 1982	M1093 Auerbach/Oberpfalz
7	17 September 1981	M1098 Siegburg
8	17 September 1981	M1098 Siegburg
9	17 September 1981	M1098 Siegburg
10	11 November 1981	M1098 Siegburg
11	11 November 1981	M1092 Hameln
12	11 November 1981	M1090 Pegnitz
13	24 May 1982	M1090 Pegnitz
14	24 May 1982	M1090 Pegnitz
15	24 May 1982	M1090 Pegnitz
16	7 November 1983	M1094 Ensdorf
17	7 November 1983	M1094 Ensdorf
18	7 November 1983	M1094 Ensdorf

The Seehunde ROVs were taken from the six decommissioned Type 351 class, which means that they are older than their motherships.
