= Niedersachsen-class frigate =

Planned and cancelled class of German Navy frigates

- Preliminary CGI of the final design by Damen

Class overview
- Builders: Damen Group; Rheinmetall; German Naval Yards
- Operators: German Navy
- Preceded by: Brandenburg class
- Succeeded by: MEKO A-200 DEU class
- Cost: €5.47 billion (2020) (equivalent to €5.64 billion in 2021) for 4 units including training facilities; €2.88 billion (2024) for 2 units; €1.39 billion (2020) (equivalent to €1.43 billion in 2021) per unit
- Built: 2023-2026
- Planned: 6
- Building: 0
- Completed: 0
- Canceled: 6

General characteristics
- Type: Frigate
- Displacement: 10,550 tonnes
- Length: 166 m (544 ft 7 in)
- Beam: 21.7 m (71 ft 2 in)
- Height: < 39 m (127 ft 11 in)
- Draft: 5.9 m (19 ft 4 in)
- Ice class: ICE 1C / E1
- Installed power: ~ 32 MW (43,000 hp)
- Propulsion: CODLAD: 4 × MTU 20V 4000 M65L gensets; 2 × Everllence 32/44CR diesel engines; Renk gearbox system; Renk electric drive motors; ABB transformers and integrated DC grid; 4 × ABB lithium-ion battery modules
- Speed: Over 26 kn (48 km/h; 30 mph) (maximum sustained speed); 11.5 kn (21.3 km/h; 13.2 mph) (electric propulsion cruise speed)
- Range: > 4,000 nmi (7,400 km; 4,600 mi) at 18 kn (33 km/h; 21 mph) speed
- Endurance: 21 days
- Boats & landing craft carried: At least 2 × 10 m rigid-hull inflatable boat), with space in the rear for 1 × additional one depending on mission
- Capacity: Accommodation for 84 additional crew, e.g. special forces or signals intelligence specialists
- Complement: 114
- Sensors & processing systems: Combat management system: Thales Tacticos; Radars: 4 × Hensoldt TRS-4D NR multi-function surveillance radar; 1 × Thales X-band APAR Block 2 multi-function fire radar; Electro-optical systems: Thales Mirador MK2 EO tracking and observation system; Thales Gatekeeper 360° IR/TV system; Sonar: ATLAS ELEKTRONIK anti-submarine warfare mission modules with an active/passive low frequency variable depth towed sonar; Communication: Thales SurfSAT-L satellite communication; Navigation suite: OSI Maritime Systems: Integrated Bridge Management Systems (IBMS)
- Electronic warfare & decoys: Decoys (radar, IR, laser); Rohde & Schwarz KORA 40 communications and radar ESM; ELINT systems and facilities
- Armament: Missiles: 16 × cells Mk 41 VLS for up to 64 ESSM Block 2B medium-range air defence missiles; 2 × RIM-116 RAM CIWS launchers for up to 21 × short-range air-defence missiles each; 2 × Kongsberg Naval Strike Missile launchers, for up to 8 NSM Block 1a cruise missiles each (anti-ship and land attack missiles); Cannons: 1 × OTO 127/64 LW Vulcano naval gun with Vulcano guided ammunition; 2 × Rheinmetall MLG27-4.0 SeaSnake 27×145 mm RCWS; 2 × Leonardo LIONFISH 12.7 Top 12.7×99mm NATO RCWS; 12.7 mm Leonardo heavy machine guns; Water guns and long range acoustic device
- Aircraft carried: 2 × NH90 Sea Tiger (ASW / ASuW); Saab Skeldar unmanned aerial vehicle (UAV)
- Aviation facilities: Aircraft hangar for 2 helicopters and UAV
- Notes: Designed to be continuously deployed with minimal maintenance for up to two years and operate for 5000 hours per year

The F126 Niedersachsen-class frigate (Fregatte 126) (formely Multi-Purpose Combat Ship 180) was a planned German frigate class intended to replace the F123 Brandenburg-class frigates in the German Navy. The ships were to be the largest surface warships to join the German Navy since World War II. The first ship, Niedersachsen, was planned to be commissioned in 2028, with Saarland, Bremen, and Thüringen to follow, but first delivery was later delayed to 2032. On 8 April 2024, Germany exercised its option to purchase an additional two frigates. The contract for two additional F126 frigates was signed on 19 June 2024. In June 2026, the project was stopped and abandoned due to cost overruns.

The project was originally estimated to cost around 10 billion euros for the new ships. However, due to massive delays and technical problems, the total cost for the six ships that were definitely planned threatened to skyrocket to as much as 18.8 billion euros before the project was halted.

The project was cancelled on 24 June 2026. By then, the project had cost the federal budget 2.3 billion euros, which corresponds to the order of magnitude of the entire German annual budget for culture. In addition, the contracted Dutch Damen shipyard group is claiming 4.68 billion euros for contractually agreed payment and indemnification claims, as the contract was terminated unilaterally.

The German Navy instead procure six MEKO A-200 DEU.

Until 1 January 2021, the project was known under the working title MKS 180 or Multi-Purpose Combat Ship 180 (Mehrzweckkampfschiff 180), with 180 indicating the class’s planned complement.

== Characteristics ==
The class was to be capable of so-called ‘mission modules’ which include devices, space, sensors and weapons for carrying out a given task optimally. If not in use, the modules can be maintained and replaced separate from the ship and also be exchanged between different ships in the class.

The ships were planned to replace the Brandenburg class in their anti-submarine warfare (ASW) role if fitted with a modular towed array sonar (the ASW module).

Similar to the Baden-Württemberg class however, they would also have been able to stay at sea for up to two years without requiring maintenance at port, with crews rotating to and from the deployed ship every four months. This capability was expected to allow for a more efficient use of hulls by reducing the time spent during transfer from Germany to conflict zones such as the sea off the Horn of Africa where German ships repeatedly took part in counter-piracy missions such as Operation Atalanta, patrolling large areas for a long time. In this case, the "detention module" enables the crew to detain suspects and if need be quarantine them in a purpose-built medical facility.

Other intended uses are the enforcement of embargoes, escorting merchant shipping or commanding maritime task forces. In 2015, modules for mine countermeasures (MCM) and a diving chamber were planned as well.

== Project history ==
=== Competitive evaluation and design selection ===
First studies for a class of future surface ships were initiated in 2009. At the time, the goal was to develop a replacement for the 143A Gepard-class fast attack craft. In reference to the five K130-class corvettes which were set to replace the older 143 Albatros class, the project was termed MÜKE (Mittlere Überwasserkampfeinheit) or K131. Eight ships were planned to join the navy by the early 2020s and then be available into the 2050s.

The ships were to be mission modular. The Navy, increasingly tasked with conducting long overseas deployments with an aging fleet of ships influenced by Cold War requirements, wished to obtain flexible ships that could be rapidly modified depending on need. This design driver, also influencing the Baden-Württemberg-class frigates at the time, caused the projected design to increase in displacement and complement compared to a typical corvette. By early 2011, the project was therefore expected to result in a "Multi-Role Combat Ship" (Mehrzweckkampfschiff). On 25 March 2013, the detailed requirements were formally decided on.

During the following analysis phase, three designs were suggested, one fulfilling all requirements and two other less expensive ones fulfilling them partially. On 8 June 2015, the fully compliant design was selected. By 2015 the number of ships had been cut to four with the first hull entering service by 2023 at a planned total cost of around 4 billion Euros and two more ships in a potential second batch. Crucially, the MKS 180 project had now grown to be the replacement for the four aging F123 Brandenburg-class frigates, representing the Navy's primary ASW capability.

The 2015 tender was open for bids from European companies, with Minister of Defence Ursula von der Leyen deciding not to prevent foreign bidders from participating under national security reasons. Several companies participated, among them:

- BAE Systems and German Naval Yards
- Damen Group and Blohm + Voss
- Thyssenkrupp Marine Systems and Lürssen

In mid 2017, BAE Systems, offering a ship based on the Type 26, withdrew from the tender and in March 2018 the German government excluded the Thyssenkrupp/Lürssen consortium. Thyssenkrupp Marine Systems then partnered as a subcontractor to German Naval Yards, while Lürssen effectively became a partner to Damen, having acquired Blohm + Voss in 2016.

In January 2020 after a five year long bidding process the Dutch Damen Group won the tender, although the ships will be constructed at the Blohm + Voss shipyard in Hamburg, Germany and at the Peene-shipyard in Wolgast, Germany, both owned by Lürssen Group. German Naval Yards protested the award, delaying the required legally binding contract signature. However, the company withdrew its protest when it and Lürssen announced they would pool their naval shipbuilding in a joint venture and that the Kiel shipyard would participate in construction.

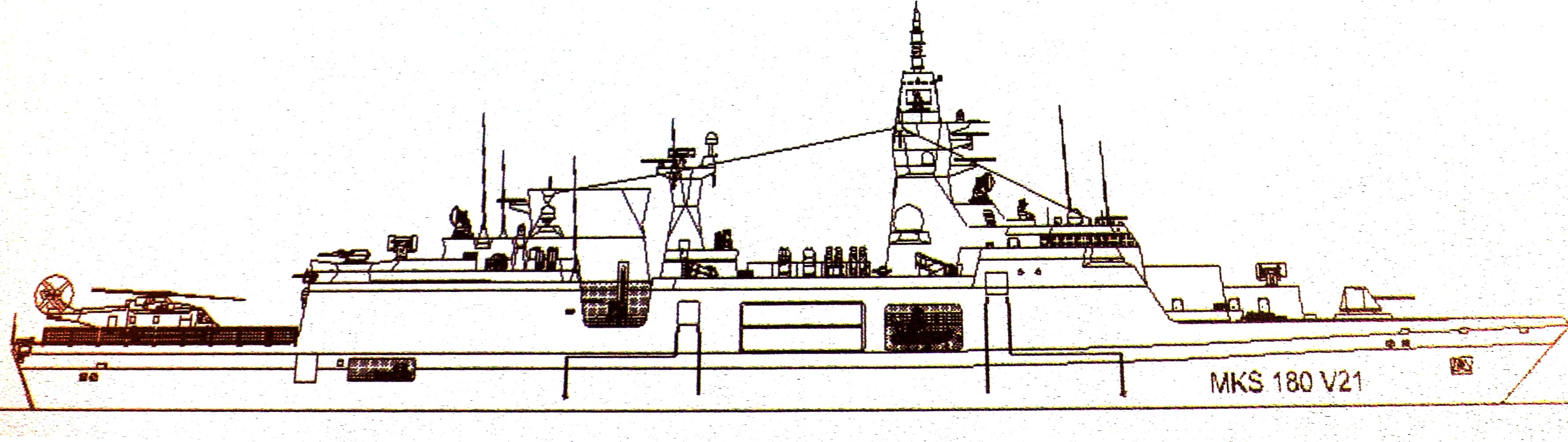
An earlier MKS 180/F126 working design

=== Contract award ===
The contract was signed on 17 June 2020. In June 2020 the German parliaments budgetary committee officially cleared 6 billion Euros for the first four ships and two options with the first ship planned to be commissioned by 2027. The contract awarded to Damen covered the ships, training facilities as well as two ASW and two detention modules and amounts to 5.48 billion Euros while weapons were contracted separately. Initial operating capability for the ships - to be based in Wilhelmshaven - was expected in 2028, later estimated as 2032.

Thales at its facilities in the Netherlands and Germany were to provide radar, IT and fire control systems, in particular the "Tacticos" combat management system and the AWWS ("above water warfare system") fire control solution. In November 2020, the provider of the underwater warfare suite had not been decided.

Wärtsila SAM Electronics in Hamburg would integrate the ships electrical systems while Canadian company OSI Maritime would deliver the navigation suite and Rolls-Royce unit Power Systems was responsible for the ship platform management and automation systems. ABB was awarded a contract to supply the ships DC power system. Electric drive motors and the gearbox were to be provided by Renk. The frigates would also be equipped with systems to handle CBRN threats, which includes multiple ChemProX-DS chemical detectors and RanidX radiation detectors.

=== Construction ===
The design passed a critical design review in early 2022, after which construction of the first ship began in December 2023, with the first steel-cutting in Wolgast while keel laying was intended for 2024.

While the fore section of the ships were to be constructed in Wolgast, the aft sections would be built in Kiel, then joined and towed to Hamburg. Fitting, tests and trials were to take place in Hamburg. The Hamburg Ship Model Basin (HSVA) conducted model-based flow testing. On 3 June 2024 the keel for the first F126 frigate, Niedersachsen, was laid down.

In January 2026 it was reported that the design data of the F126 was successfully transferring from Damen to Naval Vessels Lürssen (NVL), which is a prerequisite for ramping up production.

=== Cancellation ===
On 24 June 2026, Bundeswehr officially announced that the project was cancelled due to "enormous cost increases and incalculable risks". The Ministry of Defense stated that the general contractor, Damen Schelde Naval Shipbuilding (DSNS) could not guarantee the scheduling and financial parameters for the F126 project. The planned six F126 frigates are to be replaced by eight MEKO A-200 DEU frigates.

By then, the project had cost the federal budget 2.3 billion euros. In addition, the contracted Dutch Damen shipyard group is claiming 4.68 billion euros via its lawyers for contractually agreed payment and indemnification claims, as the contract was terminated unilaterally by minister of defence Boris Pistorius. In that case the loss for public found would be nearly 7 billion euros, more than two thirds of the planned budget without having a single ship.

As part of the overall project, expensive major technical components—such as engines, transmissions, and specific radar systems—have already been manufactured by suppliers or secured through contracts.

The ship parts that have already been manufactured are being scrapped and will not be used further.

| Pennant number | Name | Construction start | Laid down | Launched | Commissioning plan | Status |
|---|---|---|---|---|---|---|
| F227 | Niedersachsen | 5 December 2023 | 3 June 2024 | — | Planned for 2032 | Cancelled |
| F228 | Saarland | — | — | — | Planned for April 2030 | Cancelled |
| F229 | Bremen | — | — | — | Planned for April 2031 | Cancelled |
| F230 | Thüringen | — | — | — | Planned for January 2032 | Cancelled |
| | | — | — | — | Planned for 2033 | Cancelled |
| | | — | — | — | Planned for 2034 | Cancelled |

== Controversy over contract award ==
Daniel Günther, Minister President of the state of Schleswig-Holstein where Kiel is located, complained in public over the decision to engage in a European tender, considering German know-how and jobs to be threatened by the government's decision. He reiterated that the construction of surface warfare ships ought to be listed as a "key technology" (Schlüsseltechnologie) which would formalise the government's ability (but not obligation) to exclude tenders on surface ships from EU competition law. According to Schleswig-Holstein's Minister of the Economy, Bernd Buchholz (FDP), this is a common practice in other European countries where government can even directly own stakes in national shipyards. He especially criticized that knowledge-intensive activities such as research and development would be occurring in the Netherlands.

The union of metalworkers (IG Metall) and labour councils in shipyards and maritime subcontractors also criticized the decision, considering 15.000 jobs to be threatened in a call on the government to protect shipyards, jobs and engage with industry to bring about a "restructurization" of shipbuilding in Germany.

On 12 February 2020, the cabinet decided to include the construction of surface ships among key technologies. The intention to do so had already been formalized during negotiations between the governing parties SPD and CDU/CSU in 2018. This has no impact on the MKS 180 tender, which had already been conducted Europe-wide.
