= Kartal-class fast attack craft =

Class overview
- Name: Kartal class
- Builders: Lürssen Werft, Bremen-Vegesack
- Operators: Turkish Naval Forces
- In commission: 1977–
- Completed: 8
- Active: 4
- Retired: 4

General characteristics
- Type: Fast attack craft
- Displacement: 206 long tons (209 t)
- Length: 42.5 m (139 ft 5 in)
- Beam: 7 m (23 ft 0 in)
- Draught: 2.4 m (7 ft 10 in)
- Propulsion: 4 × Mercedes-Benz diesel engines; 12,000 hp (8.9 MW); 4 shafts
- Speed: 42 knots (78 km/h; 48 mph)
- Range: 700 nmi (1,300 km; 810 mi) at 35 kn (65 km/h; 40 mph)
- Complement: 39
- Sensors & processing systems: Decca 1226 navigation radar
- Armament: 2 × quad Penguin Mk.2 SSM launchers; 2 × Bofors 40 mm autocannon; 2 × single G-7A 21 in (533 mm) torpedo launchers; 4 × Mines

The Kartal class is a class of fast attack missile and torpedo boats of the Turkish Navy.

The vessels of this class were built by Lürssen Werft in Germany, and were based on the Zobel class. However, unlike the Zobel class, which were armed with only torpedoes, the Kartal class are armed with missiles and torpedoes, and can carry up to four mines.

TCG Kartal was the first vessel of the class to be launched, but TCG Denizkuşu was the first to be delivered and commissioned. TCG Meltem sank after colliding with the Soviet training ship Khasan in 1985. Meltem was salvaged, but never repaired.

== List of boats ==
| Pennant number | Name | Commissioned | Fate |
|---|---|---|---|
| P-321 | Denızkuşu | 15 June 1968 | |
| P-322 | Atmaca | 28 July 1967 | |
| P-323 | Şahın | 19 July 1966 | |
| P-324 | Kartal | 25 July 1966 | |
| P-325 | Meltem | 25 October 1968 | Sunk in collision 1985, salvaged |
| P-326 | Pelıkan | 17 December 1969 | |
| P-327 | Albatros | 7 February 1968 | |
| P-328 | Şımşek | 22 July 1970 | |
| P-329 | Kasirga | 23 October 1970 | |

== See also ==
- List of Turkish Navy ships
