= Lürssen (surname) =

Lürssen or Luerssen is a surname. Notable people with the surname include:

- Christian Luerssen (1843–1916), German botanist
- Friedrich Lürssen (1851–1916), German shipbuilder and company founder of Lürssen
- Otto Lürssen (1889–1932), German shipbuilder and businessman
