= Class 142 =

Class 142 may refer to:

- British Rail Class 142
- DR Class 130 family
- Zobel-class fast attack craft, also known as Type 142
