= Seeadler-class fast attack craft =

German naval ship class (1958–1976)

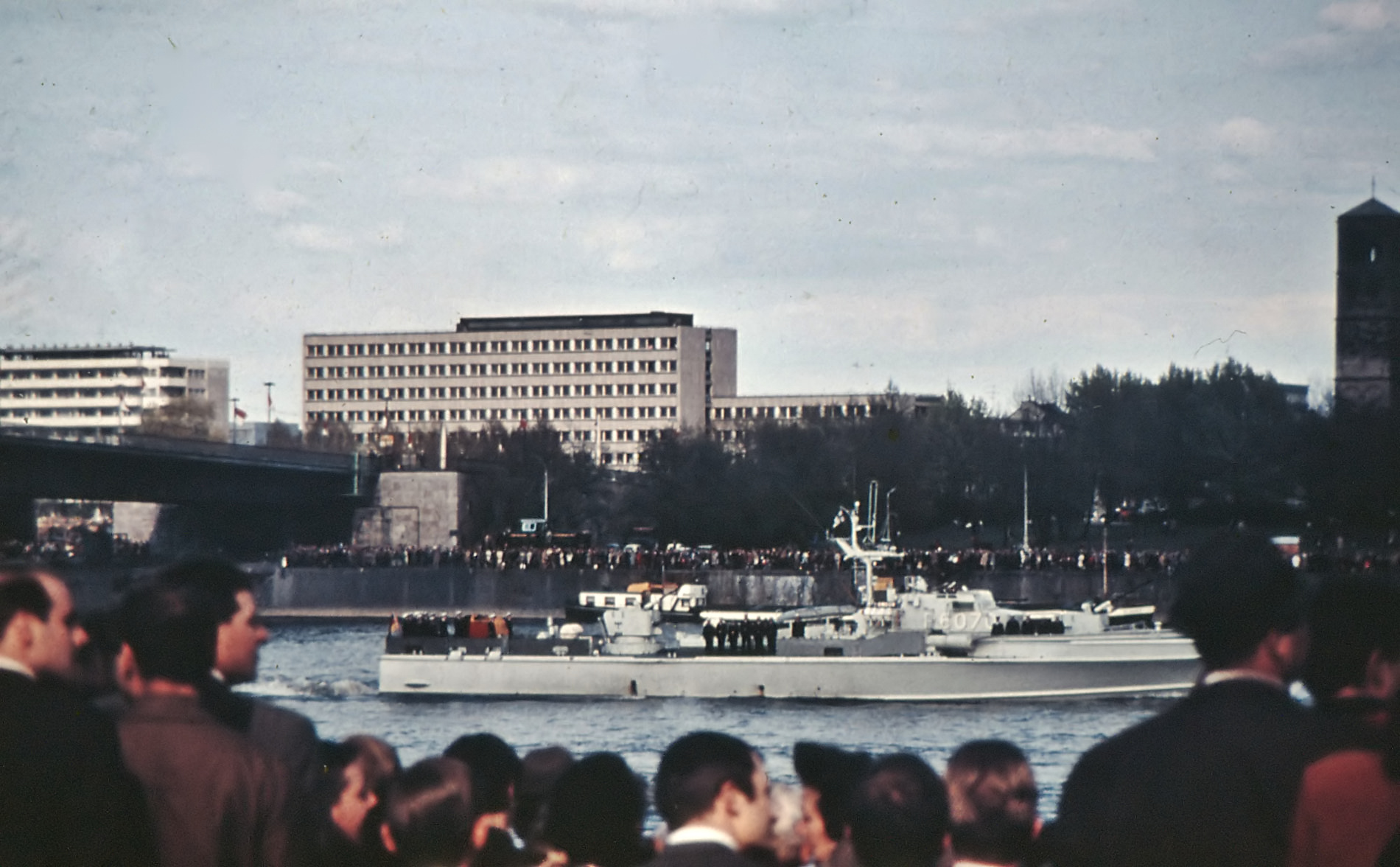
- Kondor in 1967

Class overview
- Name: Seeadler class
- Builders: Lürssen, Bremen-Vegesack
- Operators: German Navy; Hellenic Navy
- Preceded by: Jaguar class
- Succeeded by: Zobel class
- In commission: 1958–1976
- Completed: 10
- Retired: 10

General characteristics
- Type: Torpedo boat (fast attack craft)
- Displacement: 183.4 tonnes standard, 210 tonnes full load
- Length: 42.6 m (139 ft 9 in)
- Beam: 7.1 m (23 ft 4 in)
- Draught: 2.3 m (7 ft 7 in)
- Propulsion: 4 Maybach MD 871 diesel engines, 3000 PS each (replaced by MD 872 engines with 3600 PS in the late 1960s); 4 propeller shafts, driving three-bladed propellers of 1.15 m diameter; Bunker: 30 t diesel, 1.12 t lubricants, 2 t fresh water
- Speed: 30 knots (56 km/h; 35 mph) cruise; 36 knots (67 km/h; 41 mph) max (later around 43.5kts )
- Range: 700 nautical miles (1,300 km; 810 mi) at 35 knots (65 km/h; 40 mph)
- Complement: 39 officers and enlisted
- Sensors & processing systems: Navigation radar, Surveillance radar
- Armament: 2 Bofors 40 mm guns, 3168 rounds of ammunition; 4 533 mm torpedo tubes, 4 torpedoes; Minelaying capabilities: The aft 2 torpedo tubes can be exchanged with 2 ramps for 23 naval mines Mk 2; 4 depth charges

The Type 141 Seeadler-class fast attack craft was a class in the German Navy. It differs from the earllier Type 140 Jaguar-class fast attack craft only in the installation of other, later more powerful diesel engine. The Seeadler class was replaced in service with the Bundesmarine by the Type 143 Albatros class.

== List of boats ==
NATO pennant number	German pennant number	Name	Callsign	Shipbuilder	Launched	Com- missioned	Decom- missioned	Fate
P6068	S6	Seeadler	DBWE	Lürssen	1 February 1958	29 August 1958	30 July 1976	To Hellenic Navy as Esperos (decommissioned 21 December 2004)
P6069	S7	Albatros				27 January 1959	19 December 1975	To Hellenic Navy, for cannibalization
P6070	S8	Kondor				24 February 1959	25 July 1976	To Hellenic Navy as Lailaps
P6071	S9	Greif				3 March 1959	30 April 1976	To Hellenic Navy as Kyklos
P6072	S10	Falke				14 April 1959	26 August 1975	To Hellenic Navy as Kataigis
P6073	S11	Geier				3 June 1959	27 June 1975	To Hellenic Navy as Tyfon
P6074	S25	Bussard				21 March 1959	28 November 1975	To Hellenic Navy, for cannibalization
P6075	S26	Habicht				21 May 1959	24 August 1976	To Hellenic Navy as Kataurus
P6076	S27	Sperber				1 July 1959	27 December 1976	To Hellenic Navy, for cannibalization
P6077	S28	Kormoran				9 November 1959	26 November 1976	To Hellenic Navy as Scorpius

== See also ==
- List of German Federal Navy ships
- List of naval ships of Germany
