= Lemwerder =

Municipality in Lower Saxony, Germany

- Municipality
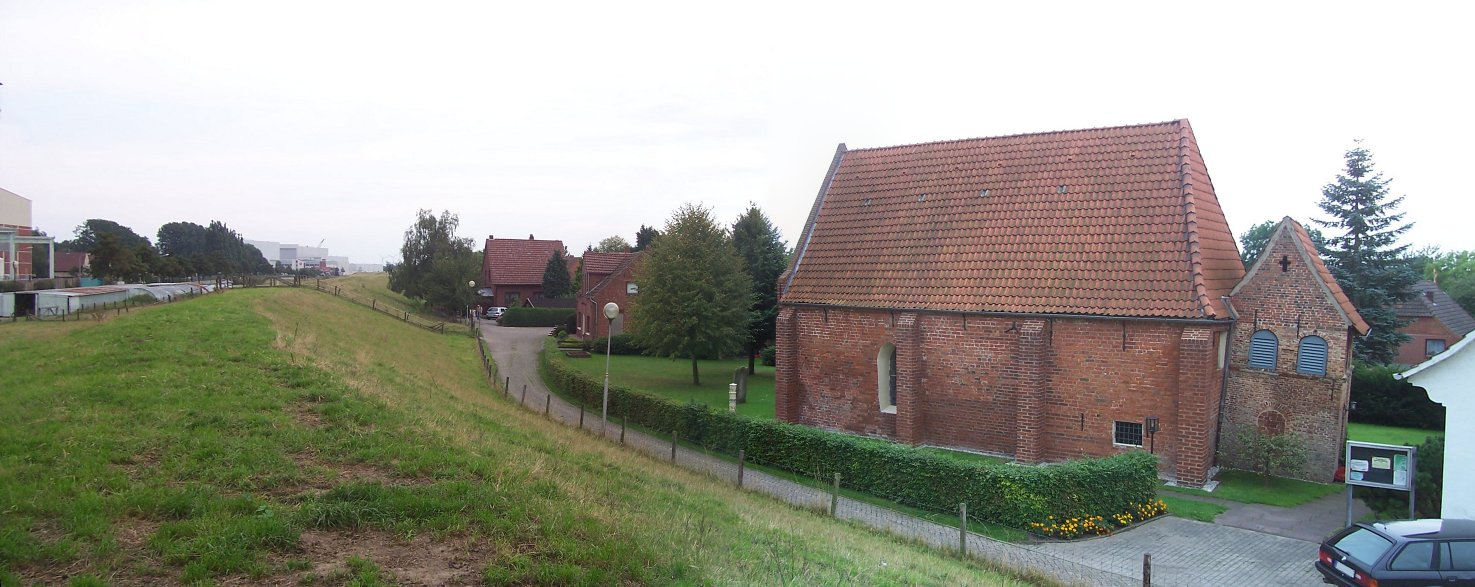
- Chapel at the dyke

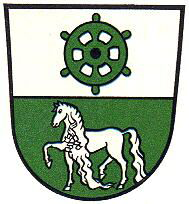
- Coat of arms

- Location of Lemwerder within Wesermarsch district
- Interactive map of Lemwerder
- Location within Germany Location within Lower Saxony
- Coordinates: 53°10′N 8°37′E
- Country: Germany
- State: Lower Saxony
- District: Wesermarsch
- Subdivisions: 19 districts

Government
  - Mayor (2021–26): Christina Winkelmann (Ind.)

Area
  - Total: 36.39 km^{2} (14.05 sq mi)
- Elevation: 1 m (3.3 ft)

Population (2025-12-31)
  - Total: 6,980
  - Density: 192/km^{2} (497/sq mi)
- Time zone: UTC+01:00 (CET)
  - Summer (DST): UTC+02:00 (CEST)
- Postal codes: 27809
- Dialling codes: 0421
- Vehicle registration: BRA
- Website: www.lemwerder.de

Lemwerder (German pronunciation: [ˈlɛmvɛʁdɐ]) is a municipality in the district of Wesermarsch, in Lower Saxony, Germany. It is on the left bank of the Weser, approximately 27 kilometres (17 mi) east of Oldenburg, and 17 kilometres (11 mi) northwest of the centre of Bremen.

Since April 2021, Lemwerder has been governed by Mayor Christina Winkelmann.

The shipbuilding companies Lürssen and Abeking & Rasmussen both have shipyards in Lemwerder that specialise in the construction of superyachts.

== People ==
- Friedrich Lürssen (1851–1916), German shipbuilder, company founder and entrepreneur
- Carl Röver (1889–1942), German Nazi Party official
