= Jaguar-class fast attack craft =

1957 class of Germany Navy fast attack craft

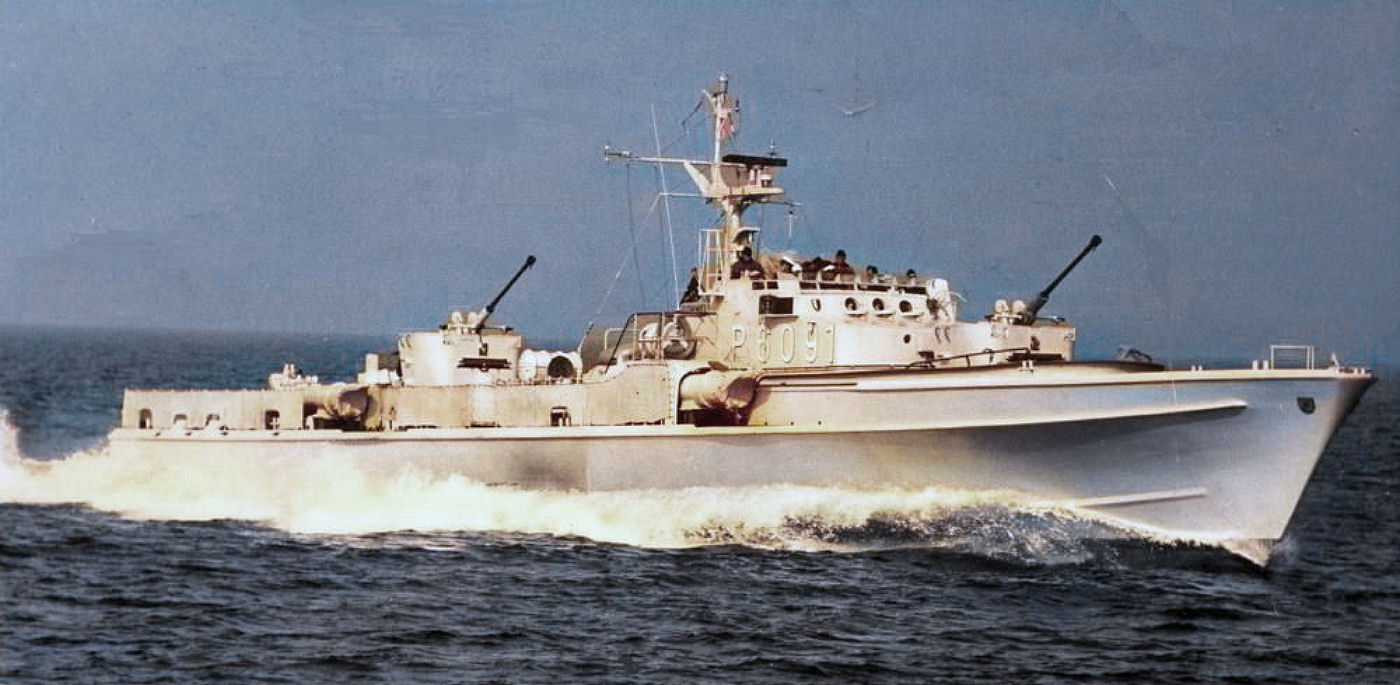
- Dommel in the late 1960s, showing her 40 mm guns

Class overview
- Builders: Lürssen, Bremen-Vegesack
- Operators: German Navy; Turkish Naval Forces; Royal Saudi Navy; Indonesian Navy
- Succeeded by: Seeadler class
- In commission: 1957–1975
- Completed: 20
- Retired: 20

General characteristics
- Type: Torpedo boat (fast attack craft)
- Displacement: 183.4 t (180.5 long tons) standard; 210 t (207 long tons) full load
- Length: 42.60 m (139 ft 9 in)
- Beam: 7.10 m (23 ft 4 in)
- Draught: 2.30 m (7 ft 7 in)
- Propulsion: 4 Mercedes-Benz MB 518 B diesel engines, 3000PS each; 4 propeller shafts, driving three-bladed propellers of 1.15 m (3 ft 9 in) diameter; Bunker: 25t fuel, 1.12t lubricants, 2t fresh water
- Speed: 42 knots (78 km/h; 48 mph) max; 39 knots (72 km/h; 45 mph) max sustained
- Range: 700 nmi (1,300 km; 810 mi)s at 35 knots (65 km/h; 40 mph)
- Complement: 39 officers and enlisted
- Sensors & processing systems: Navigation radar, surveillance radar
- Armament: 2 Bofors 40 mm/70 Model 1958 guns, 3168 rounds of ammunition; 4 533 mm torpedo tubes; Minelaying capabilities: The aft 2 torpedo tubes can be supplemented with 2 ramps for 23 naval mines Mk 12; 14 depth charges

The Type 140 Jaguar-class fast attack craft is an evolution of the German torpedo boats (E-boats) of World War II. The design was developed by Lürssen and designated Schnellboot 55. The 20 boats that were built for the German Navy were in service from 1957 to 1975. Then the Jaguar-class boats were replaced in service with the Bundesmarine by the Tiger class.

The Jaguar-class boats were relatively well suited for high sea action. In NATO strategy it was their duty to intercept landing operations in the Baltic Sea, prevent transfers of ships of the Soviet Union and to keep the transatlantic supply lines open through the North Sea.

The Seeadler class differs from the Type 140 only in the model of engine.

== List of boats ==
NATO pennant number	German pennant number	Name	Commissioned	Decommissioned	Fate
P6059	S1	Jaguar	16 November 1957	22 June 1973	sold to private shipyard
P6058	S2	Iltis	19 December 1957	31 January 1975	Used as target ship, then to Turkish Navy for cannibalization
P6062	S3	Wolf	12 February 1958	21 March 1975	To Turkish Navy as P335 Kalkan; retired
P6061	S4	Luchs	27 March 1957	1 December 1972	sold to private company
P6060	S5	Leopard	20 May 1958	28 May 1973	sold to private shipyard
P6065	S12	Löwe	5 February 1959	25 April 1975	To Turkish Navy as P332 Kiliç; retired
P6066	S13	Fuchs	17 March 1959	13 July 1973	sold to private shipyard
P6067	S14	Marder	7 July 1959	22 June 1972	sold to private shipyard
P6082	S15	Weihe	28 October 1959	5 July 1972	To France as target ship, sunk
P6083	S16	Kranich	19 December 1959	2 November 1973	Museum ship in Bremerhaven, scrapped 2006
P6085	S17	Storch	12 March 1960	29 March 1974	To Turkish Navy as P331 Tufan; retired
P6087	S18	Häher	5 April 1960	15 December 1974	To Turkish Navy as P333 Mizrak; retired
P6088	S19	Elster	8 July 1960	19 July 1974	sold to private shipyard
P6089	S20	Reiher	15 August 1960	21 August 1973	To Turkish Navy for cannibalization (?)
P6091	S21	Dommel	4 February 1961	22 March 1974	converted by Eberhard-Werft, Arnis to private yacht Lina III, later El Chris
P6090	S22	Pinguin	28 March 1961	14 December 1972	To Turkish Navy as P336 Karayel, possibly converted to private yacht Sea Star in 2007
P6063	S23	Tiger	15 October 1958	20 December 1974	To Turkish Navy as P334 Yildiz; retired
P6064	S24	Panther	12 December 1958	1 March 1973	sold to private shipyard
P6084	S29	Alk	14 January 1960	6 August 1974	To Turkish Navy for cannibalization (?)
P6086	S30	Pelikan	30 March 1960	31 May 1974	To Turkish Navy as P330 Firtina; retired
