= Rising Sun (yacht) =

Motor yacht built by Lürssen

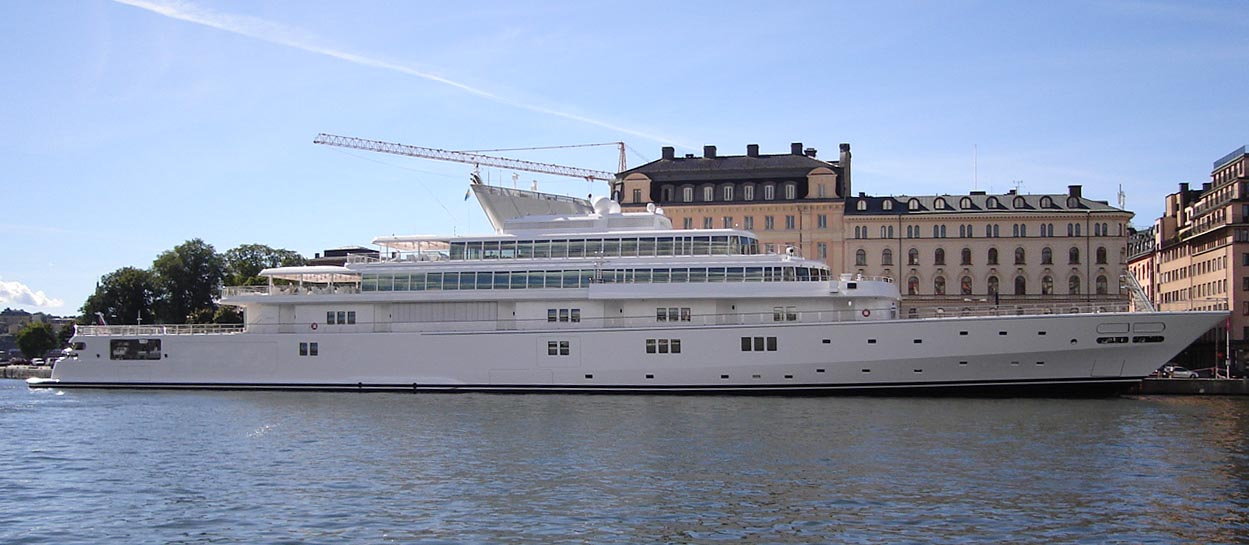
- Rising Sun at Nybrokajen in Stockholm, Sweden. August 2005.

History
- Name: Rising Sun
- Owner: David Geffen
- Builder: Lürssen
- Launched: March 2004
- Identification: IMO number: 8982307; MMSI number: 319011000; Callsign: ZCII7

General characteristics
- Type: Motor yacht
- Tonnage: 7,841 GT
- Length: 138 m (452 ft 9 in)
- Installed power: 4 × MTU 20V 8000 M90 diesel engines 36,000 kW (48,000 hp)
- Propulsion: 4 propellers
- Speed: 28 knots (52 km/h; 32 mph)

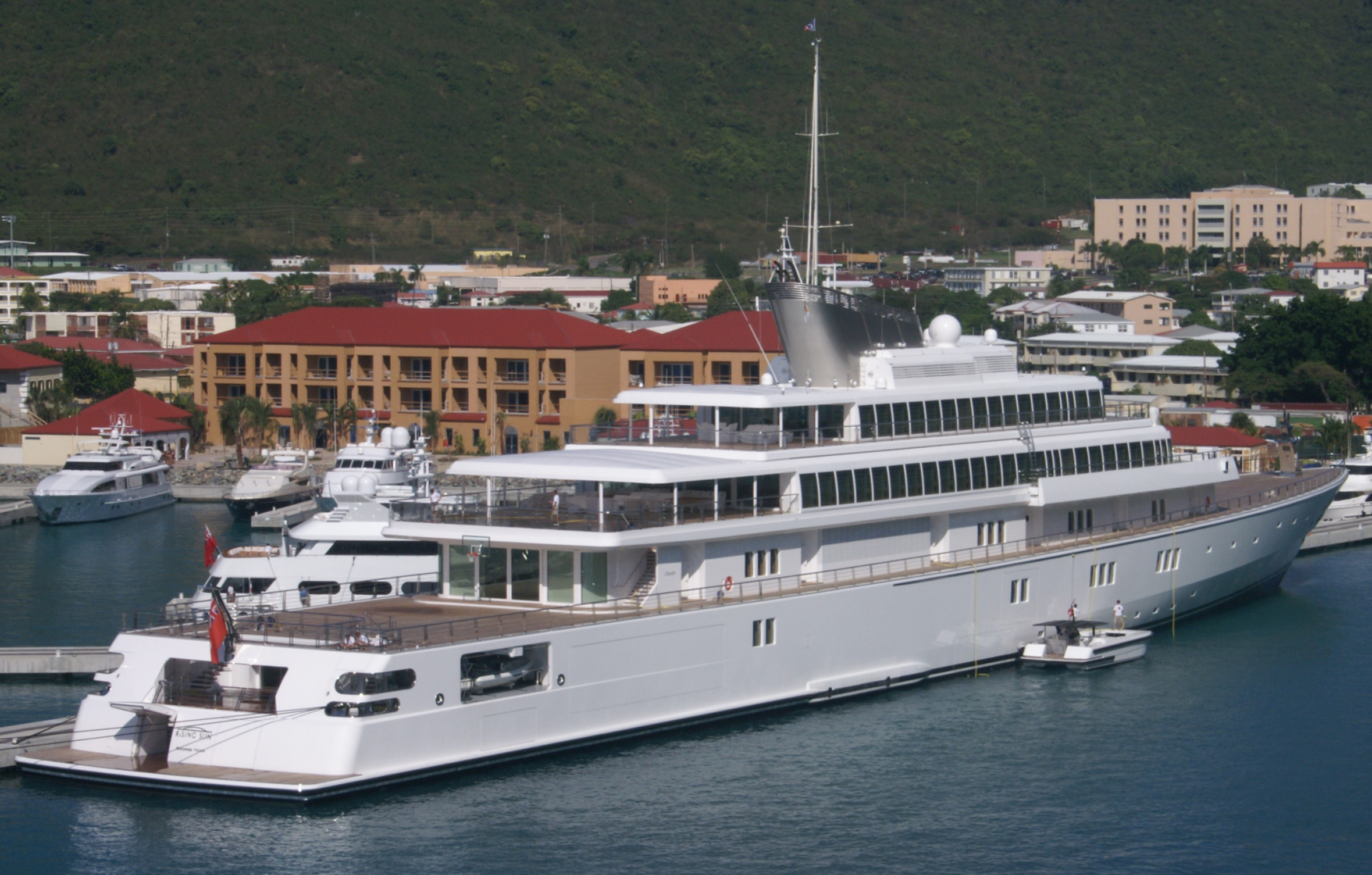
Rising Sun in 2006 showing the rear and side of the yacht.

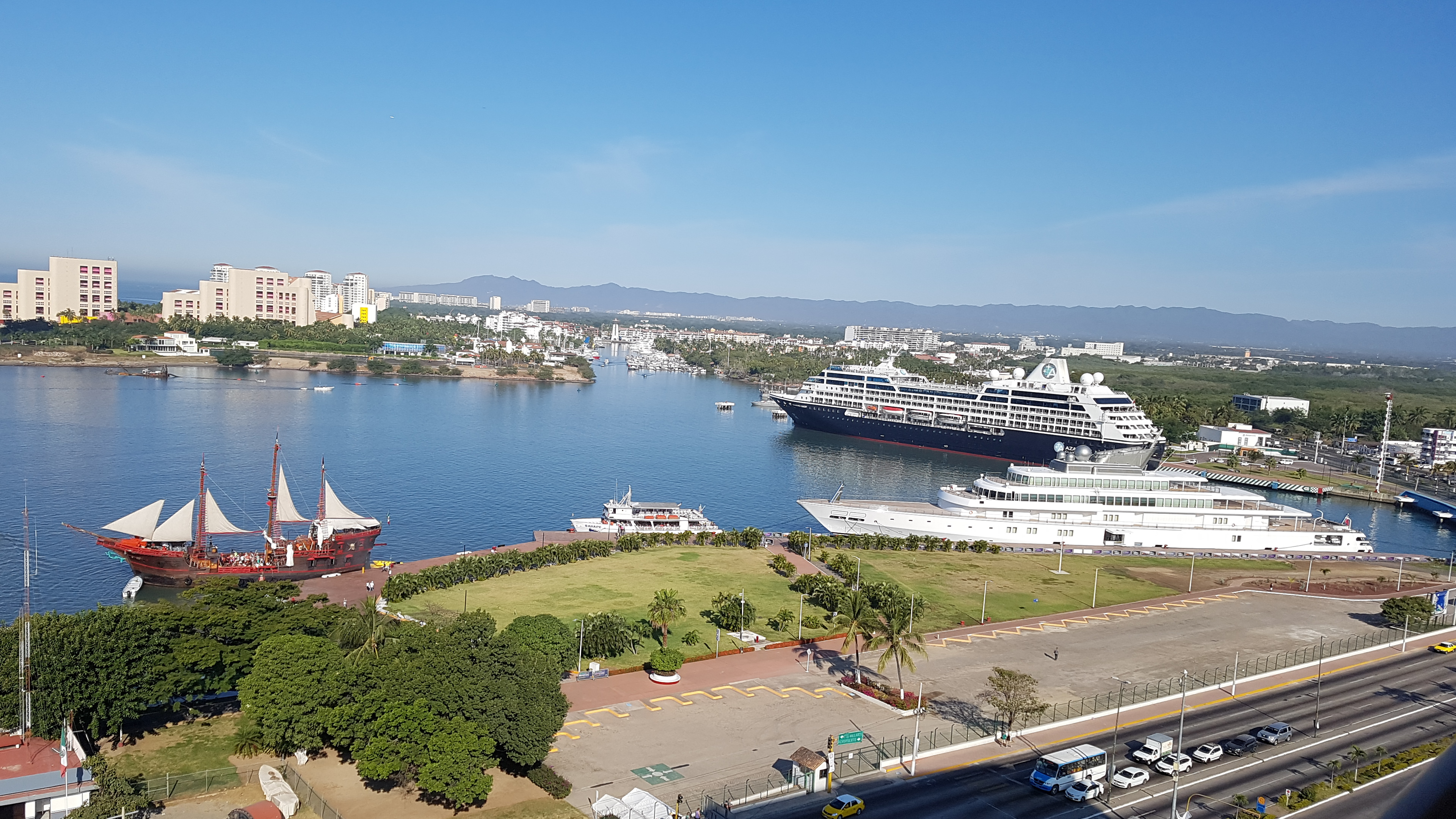
Rising Sun docked alongside other ships in Puerto Vallarta, Mexico on February 4, 2017.

Rising Sun is a motor yacht designed by Jon Bannenberg, and built in 2004 by Germany's Lürssen at their Bremen shipyard for Larry Ellison, CEO of Oracle Corporation, and last refitted in 2007. Rising Sun has been owned since 2010 by businessman David Geffen, who had initially bought a half share of the yacht in late 2006.

A gym, a basketball court, a wine cellar and a movie theater are among the yacht's 82 rooms.

Some of the guests on Geffen's yacht have included Leonardo DiCaprio, Paul McCartney, Bruce Springsteen and Oprah Winfrey.

At the beginning of the COVID-19 pandemic in March 2020, Geffen drew backlash for posting on Instagram that he and his 45-member crew were self-isolating in the Grenadines on Rising Sun.
