= Lürssen =

German shipbuilding company

Fr. Lürssen Werft GmbH & Co. KG
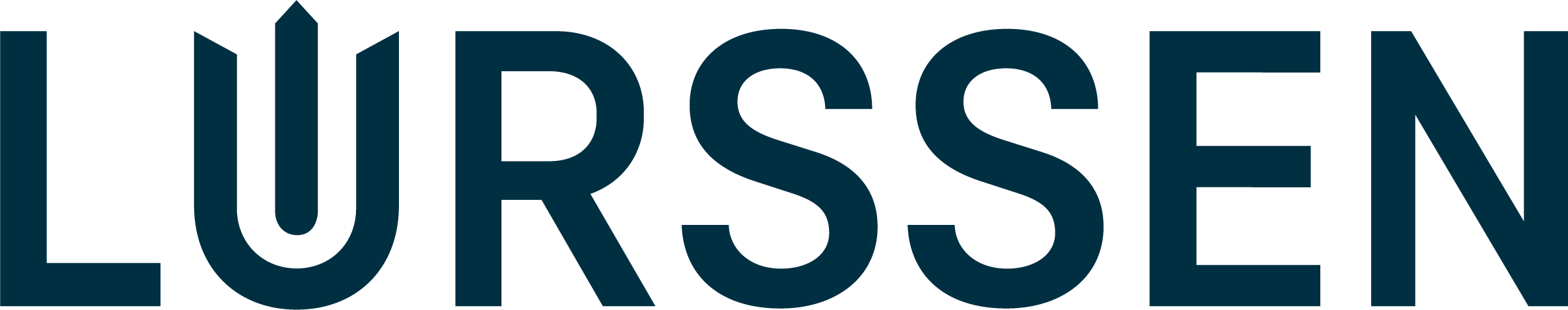
- Type: GmbH
- Industry: Shipbuilding
- Founded: 1875; 151 years ago
- Founder: Friedrich Lürssen
- Headquarters: Bremen-Vegesack, Germany
- Area served: Worldwide
- Key people: Peter Lürssen (CEO)
- Products: Yachts
- Revenue: €1.83 billion
- Number of employees: 1,935
- Divisions: Fr. Lürssen Werft; Lürssen Logistics; Lürssen Yachts; Lürssen Schacht-Audorf (Rendsburg); Lürssen Berne-Bardenfleth
- Website: www.luerssen.de
- Footnotes; Slogan: my firm shall be known as the leader in both quality and performance. (Friedrich Lürssen, 1875)

Lürssen (or Lürssen Werft) is a German shipyard with headquarters in Bremen-Vegesack and shipbuilding facilities in Lemwerder, Rendsburg, Wolgast, Hamburg, and Bremen-Fähr-Lobbendorf and Bremen- Berne. It is the largest yacht builder in the world.

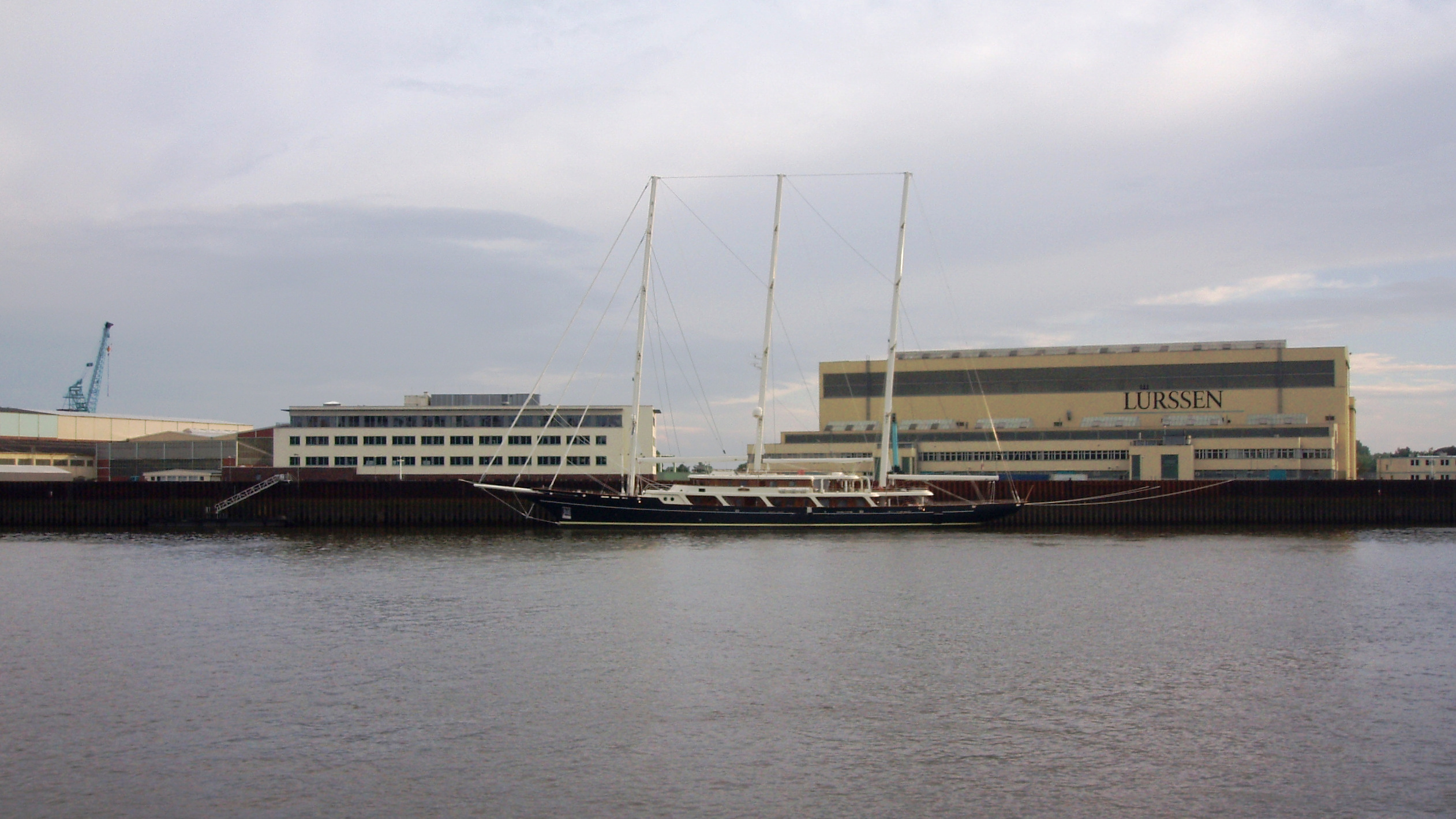
Plant in Lemwerder

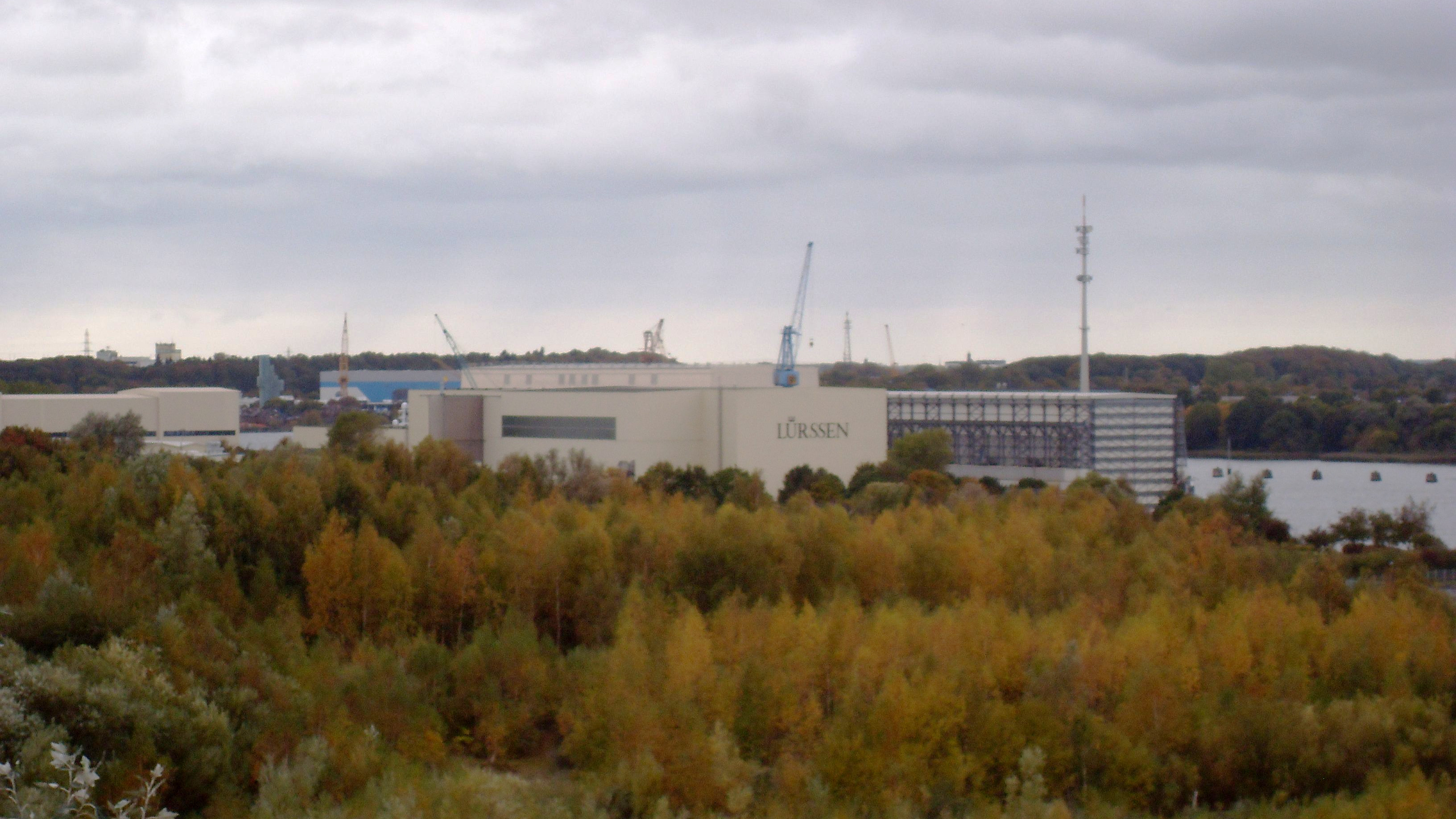
Plant in Schacht-Audorf (Rendsburg) damaged by a fire in 2024

Lürssen designs and constructs yachts, naval ships and special vessels. Trading as Lürssen Yachts, it is one of the leading builders of custom superyachts such as Paul Allen's Octopus, David Geffen's Rising Sun, and Khalifa bin Zayed Al Nahyan's Azzam, the second largest private yacht in the world at 180 m in length after the REV Ocean.

== History ==
On 27 June 1875 the 24 year-old Friedrich Lürssen set up a boatbuilding workshop in Aumund, a suburb of Bremen, Germany. The focus of work in the first years was on work boats for fishing and ferry operations. Hull number one was a five meter long rowboat. From the 1880s Lürssen opened up the sport boat market. In 1886 the first motorboat in the world was built by Lürssen (according to his own account).

In 2016 Lürssen acquired shipbuilding company Blohm+Voss in a long-term partnership.

On 1 March 2018, a German consortium consisting of Thyssen Krupp and Lürssen was excluded by the German government from the tender for the construction of the multi-purpose warship MKS 180 for the benefit of GNY (German Naval Yards), belonging to the Prinvinvest group, and the Dutch shipbuilder Damen.

On 14 September 2018, a fire broke out in the floating dock at Fähr-Lobbendorf, burning the then-under construction structure of the yacht Sassi. With around 900 emergency services deployed, it was the largest deployment of the Bremen fire brigade in the post-war period. The damage was estimated at more than 610 million euros.

On 29 September 2021, Peter Lürssen, owner of Blohm+Voss, announced downsizing of the company, from the ~ 580 workers, more than 100 would leave the company, the docks were to be reviewed, no more cruise ships would be renewed in Hamburg, nor tankers and container ships. B+V was to stay only with the NVL defence ships and the yachts business. The area of installations was to be reduced as well. The Department of Projects of New Buildings was dissolved.

In June 2025, Lürssen's Australian operation was sold to Civmec.

== Yachts ==
Lürssen is known for building some of the most notable yachts in the world. Dilbar, the highest volume superyacht in the world in 2016, was launched by Lürssen as was the longest superyacht in the world, Azzam, in 2013. Below is a list of all the yachts built by Lürssen:

== Naval Vessels Lürssen ==
Naval Vessels Lürssen (NVL) was the military division of Lürssen, and builds small to medium size naval vessels, mainly for exporting. In September 2025 it was announced that NVL had been bought by German arms manufacturer Rheinmetall as part of its conglomeration of German defence production. Naval Vessels Lürssen (NVL) operates four shipyards in northern Germany.

=== History of naval shipbuilding by NVL ===
Naval ships built by Lürssen in the past include:

- Many E-boats of World War II, based on Lürssen's design for Otto Hermann Kahn's private yacht Oheka II
- World War II R boat minesweepers, including the first minesweeper (1929) fitted with a Voith Schneider propeller (R8)
- Jaguar-class fast attack craft
- Seeadler-class fast attack craft
- Zobel-class fast attack craft
- Intrépida-class fast attack craft
- Tiger-class fast attack craft
- Frankenthal-class minehunter
- Kılıç-class fast attack craft, 1988 to Turkey
- Darussalam-class offshore patrol vessel, Brunei
- Victory-class corvette

=== Australian Navy ships ===
Lürssen has the contract to design and build twelve (reduced to six) Arafura-class offshore patrol vessels for Australia. Construction of the first two will be in Adelaide by ASC Pty Ltd. The remaining four will be constructed in Western Australia by Civmec.

Lürssen was awarded a $2.6 billion contract in 2017 to build twelve patrol boats for the Australian Navy. Work began in Adelaide in mid-2018. Lürssen was the general contractor and was responsible for the design, construction management and the overall manufacturing process. The first "Offshore Patrol Vessel" (OPV) was commissioned in 2025 and replaced the Royal Australian Navy's former Armidale-class vessels.

=== Bulgarian Navy ships ===
In 2021 NVL started building two multi-purpose patrol ships for the Bulgarian Navy, in collaboration with MTG Dolphin Shipyard in Varna.

=== German Navy ships ===
==== Braunschweig class ====
NVL Lürssen has been involved with the building of Braunschweig-class corvettes since 2004.

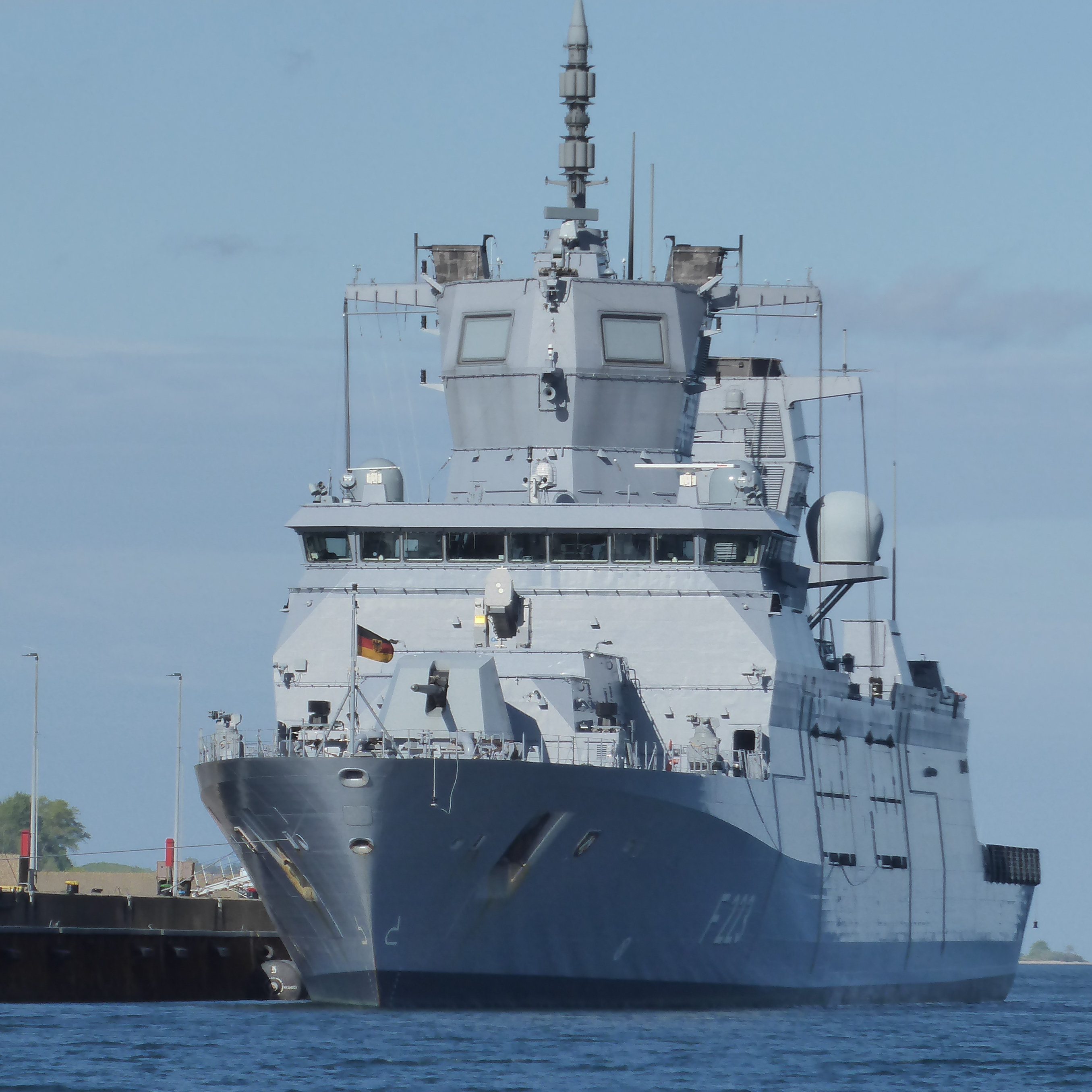
The German Navy Baden-Württemberg-class frigate F223 Nordrhein-Westfalen on 22 May 2019.

==== Baden-Württemberg class ====
NVL is part of the ARGE F125 joint-venture enterprise designing and building the Baden-Württemberg-class frigates since 2011.

==== Class 424 ====
German Navy wanted to replace its SIGINT ships of Oste class 423 by three new ships of class 424. In June 2021, the Bundestag approved the development and procurement of three auxiliary ships as well as a training and reference reconnaissance facility (ARAA) for sea-based signal detection reconnaissance (ssA). As the main contractor, Lürssen was commissioned to develop the systems by February 2023. All services should be completed by 2029. The first of the three boats is scheduled to be put into service in 2027 and will mark the replacement of the fleet service boats Oker, Alster and Oste from the 1980this.

When concluding the contract with Naval Vessels Lürssen (NVL) in June 2021, the Federal Audit Office, Bundesrechnungshof reported “significant concerns”. It criticized the fact that the Ministry of Defense only wanted to discuss with the shipyard after the contract had been signed how exactly the ships should be built. "Billions were awarded blindly and a very bad negotiating situation," wrote the Süddeutsche Zeitung. The Federal Audit Office feared "additional expenditure in the medium term."

In 2023, the ships only existed vaguely and sketchily on paper. The new building increased in price from 2.1 billion euros to 3.3 billion euros (2023). The Federal court of Audit, Bundesrechnungshof intervened in 2023 and stated that there were significant risks arising from the contract structure with Lürssen.

== Gallery ==
=== Yachts ===
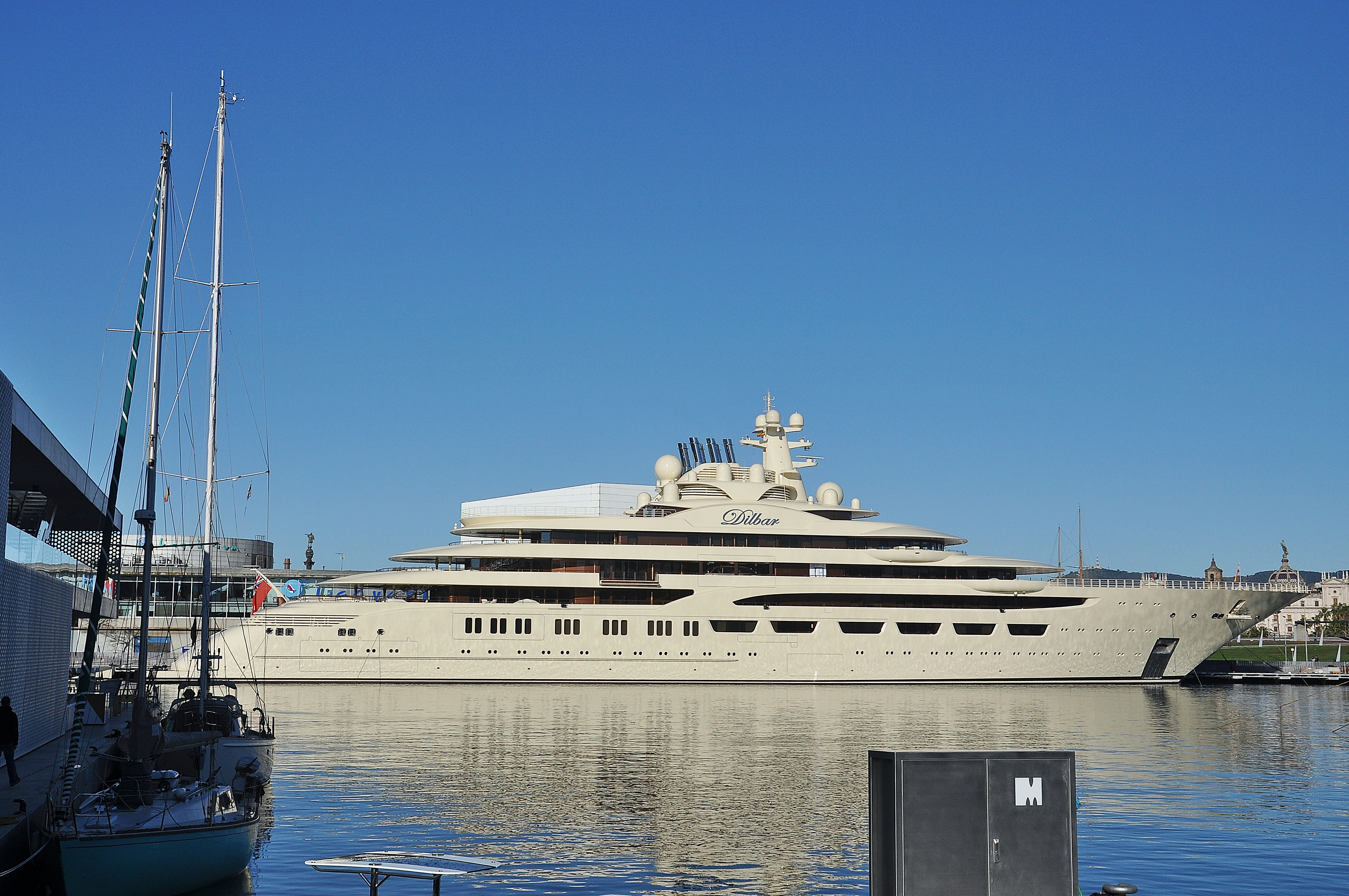
Dilbar

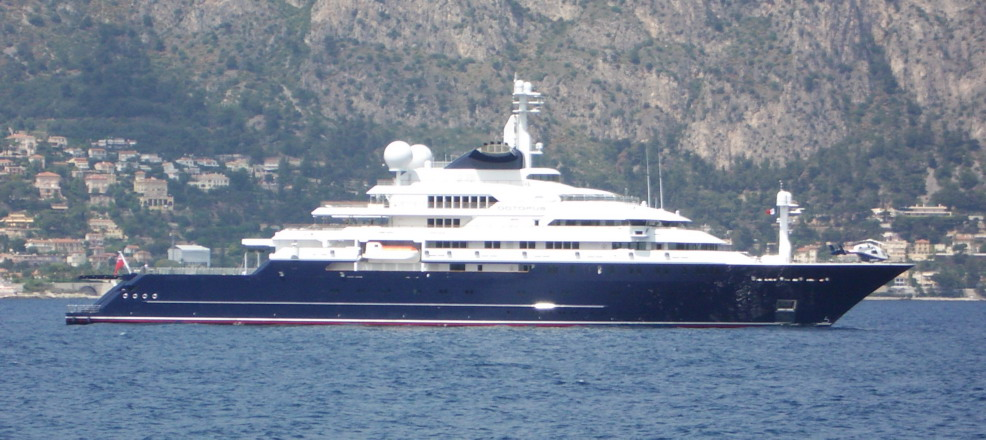
Octopus

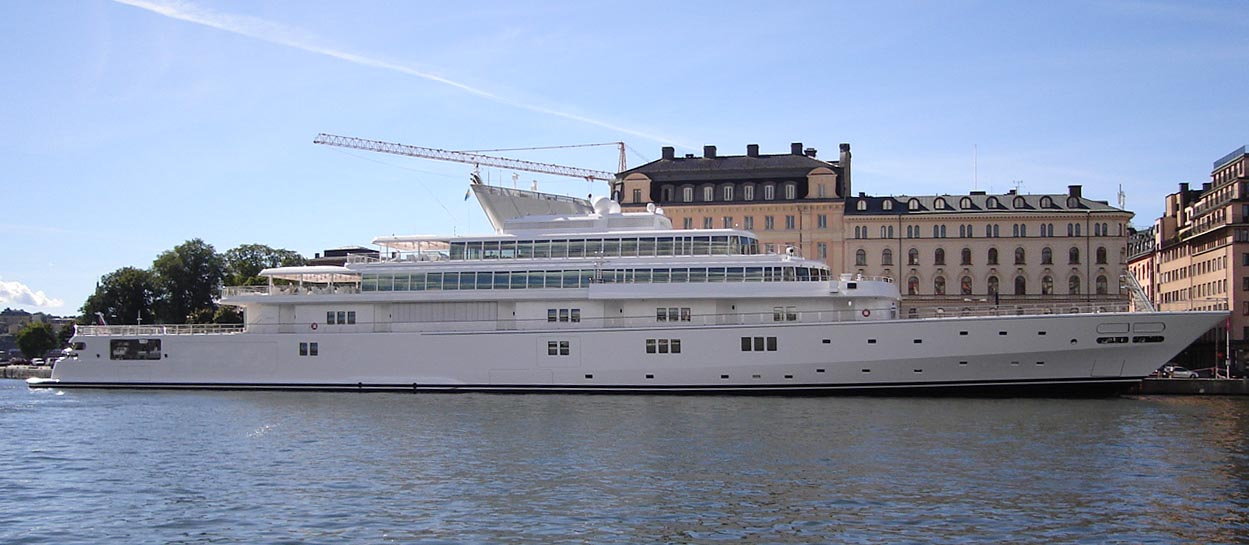
Rising Sun

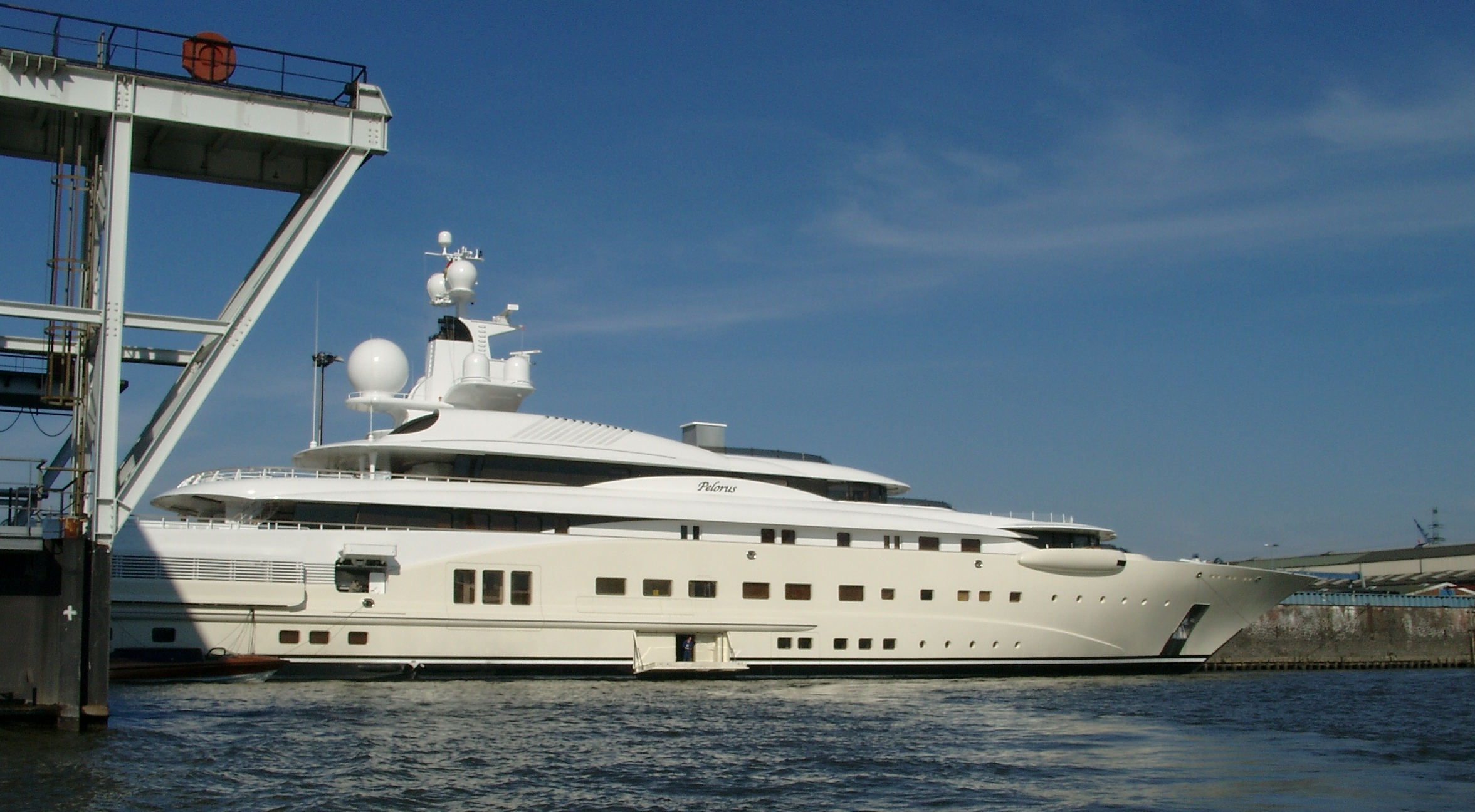
Pelorus

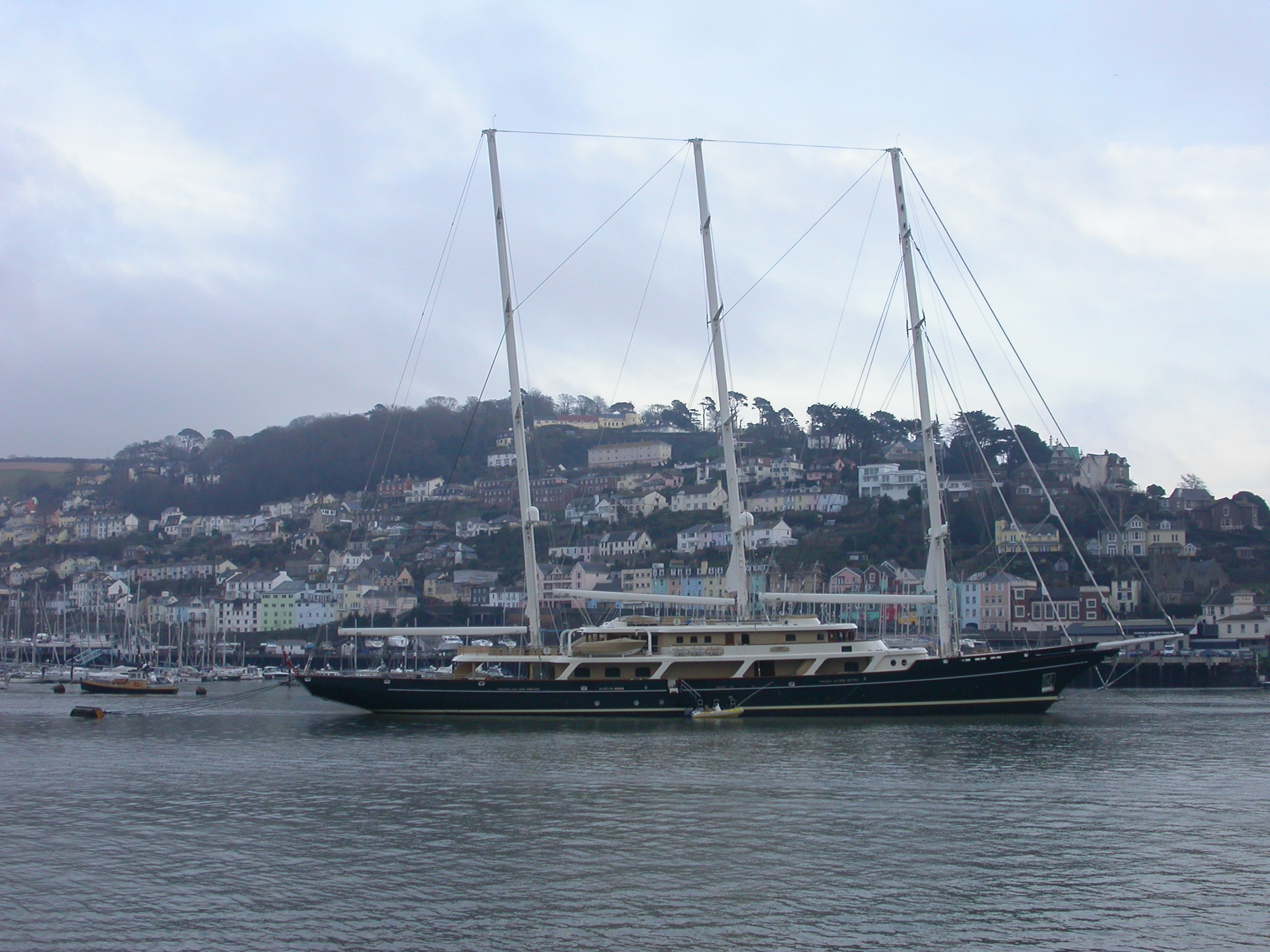
Eos

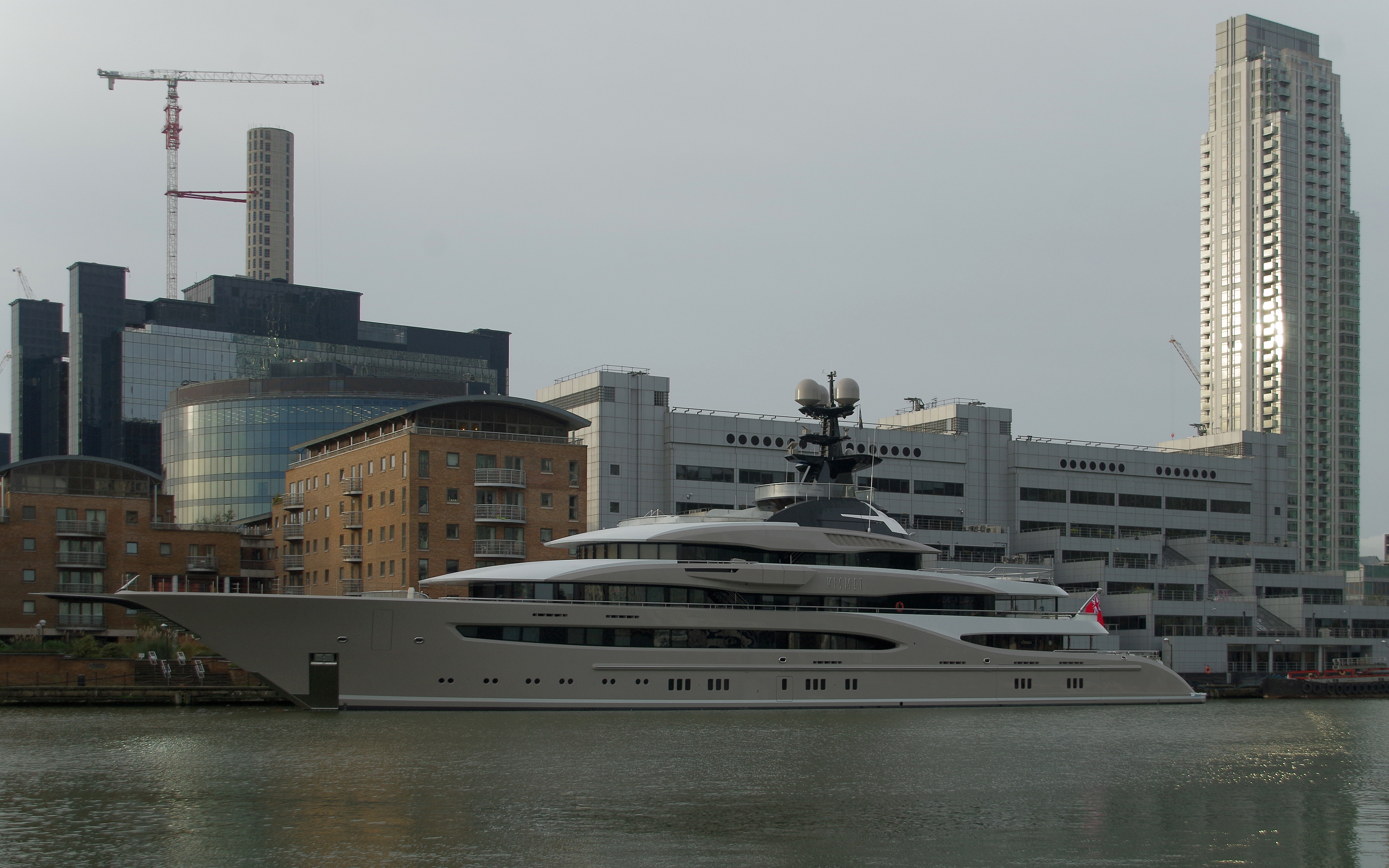
Kismet

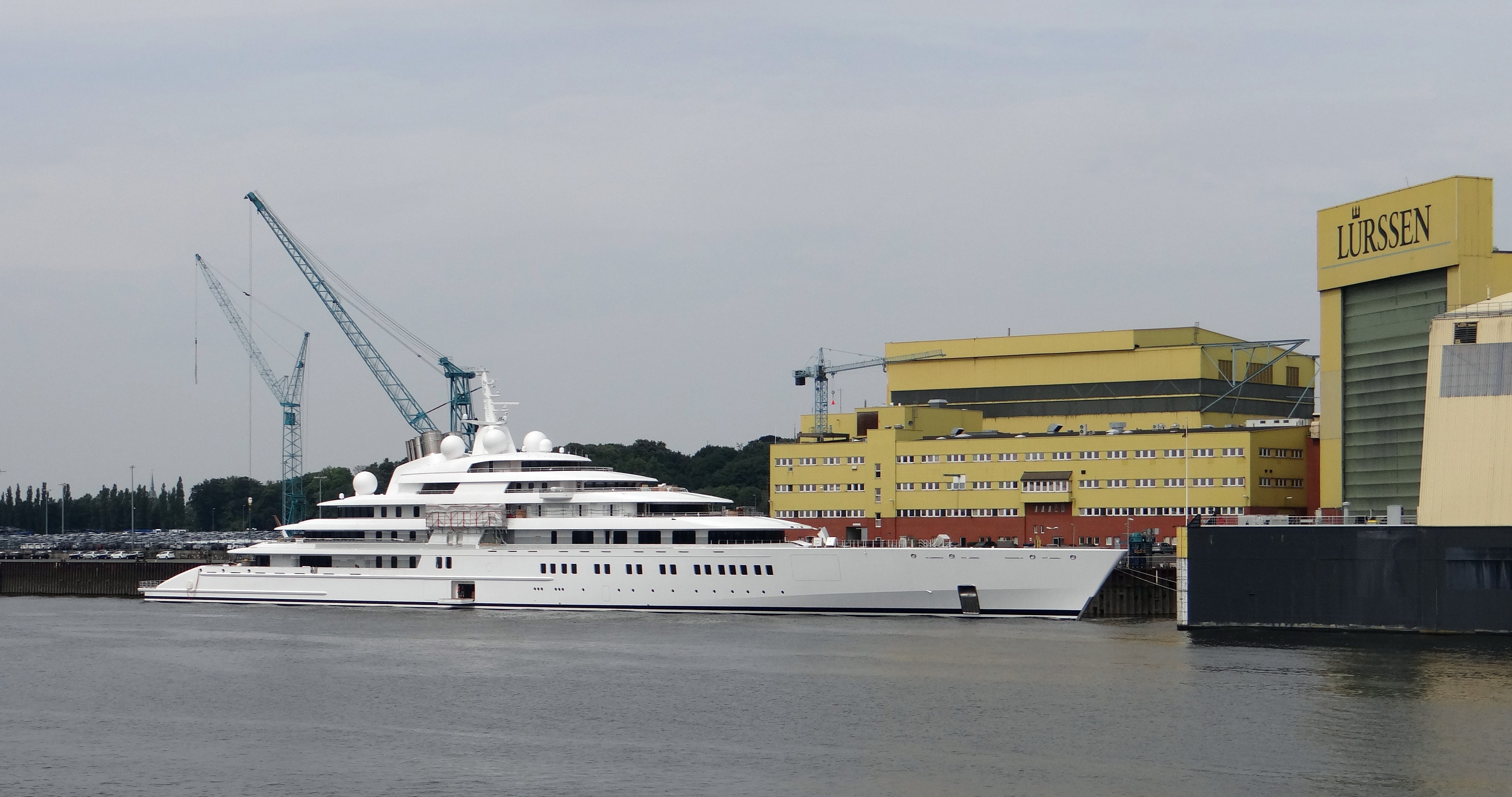
Azzam

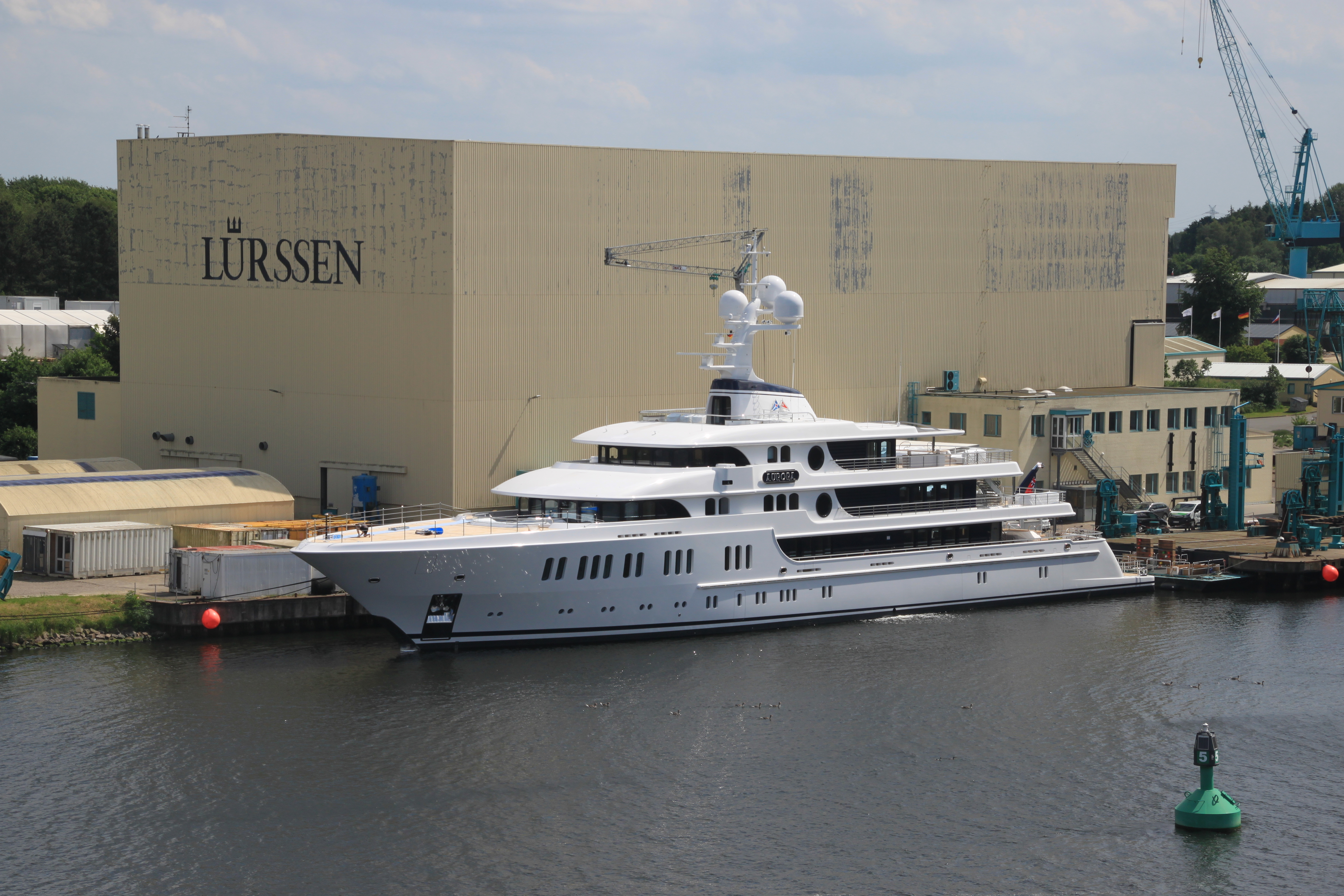
Aurora

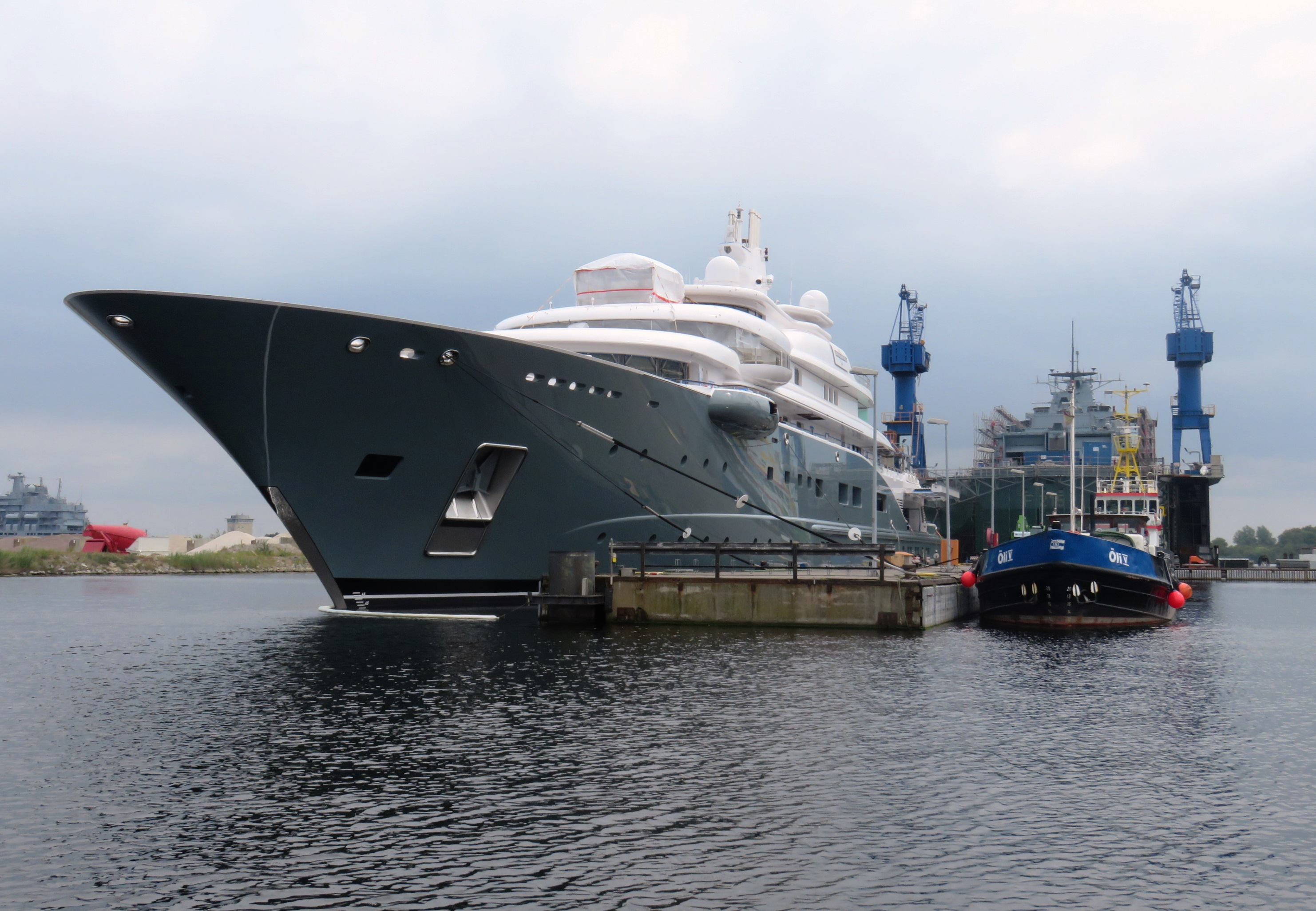
Radiant

=== Warships ===
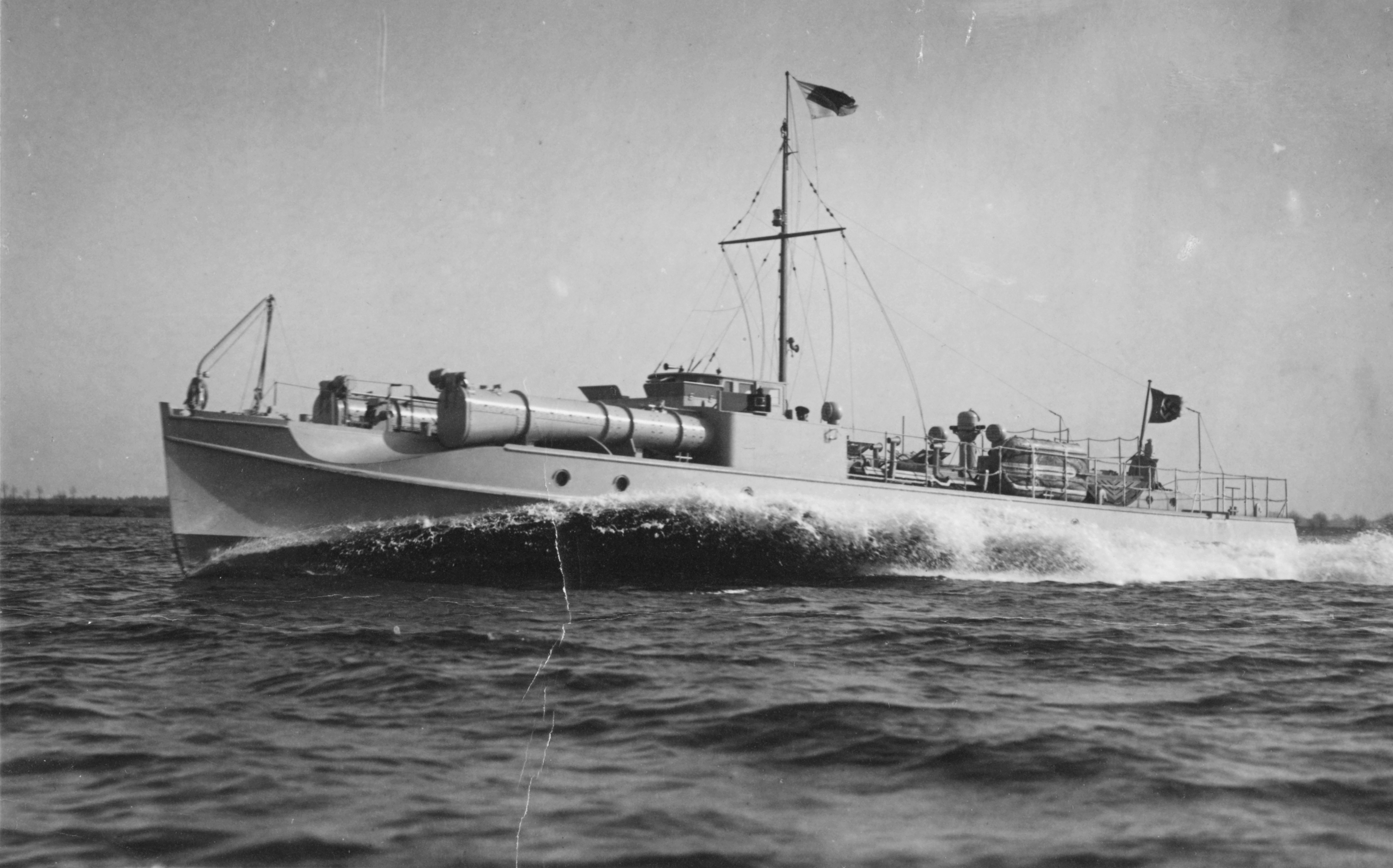
E-boat

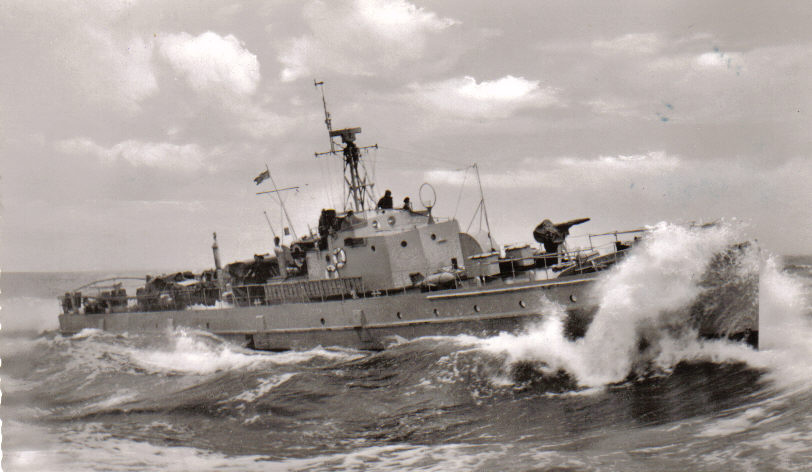
R boat

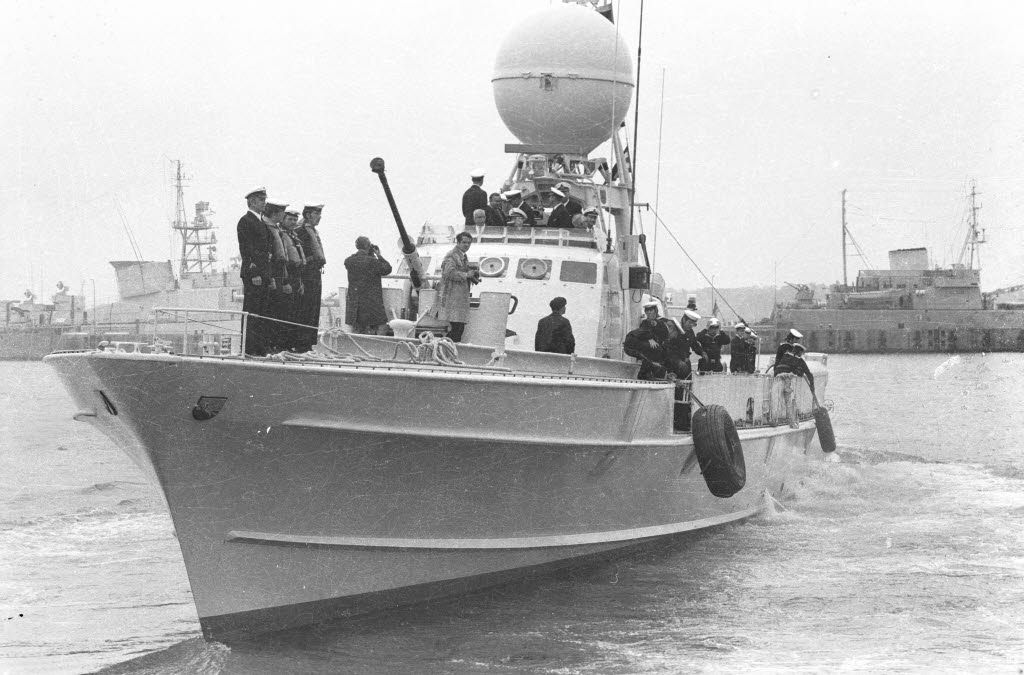
Zobel class

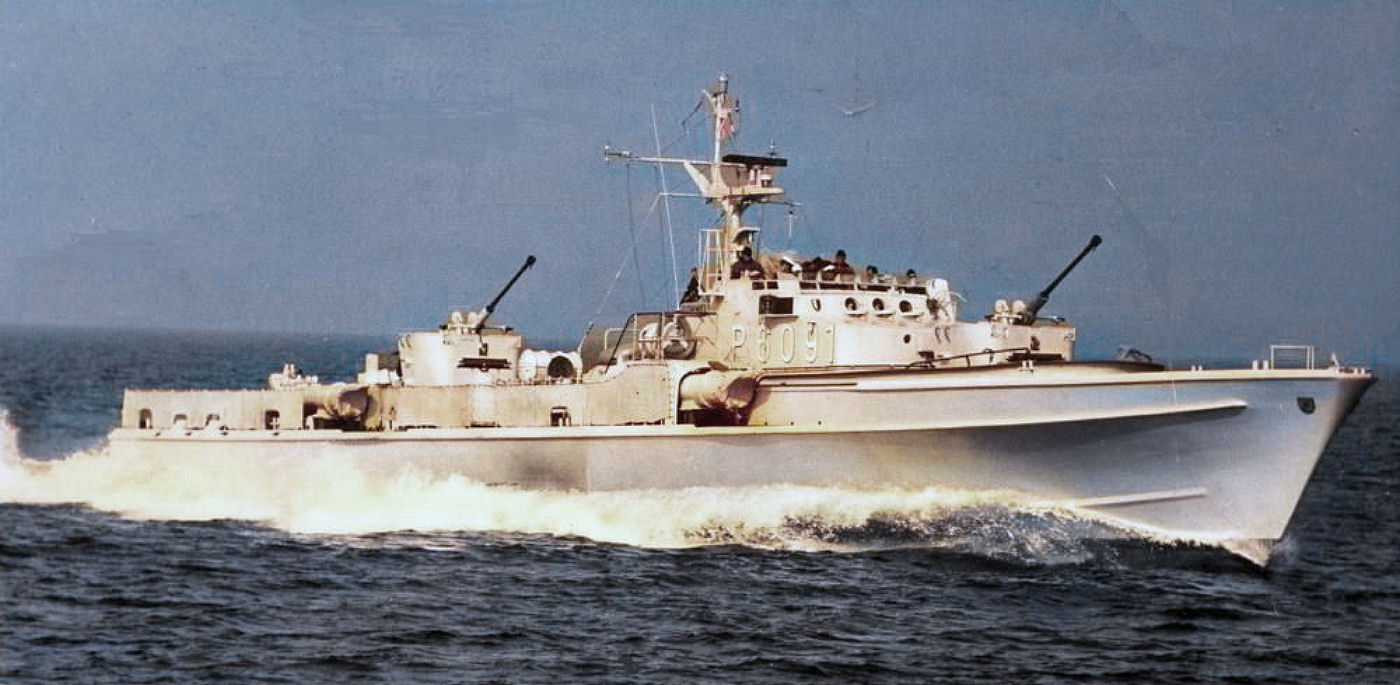
Jaguar class

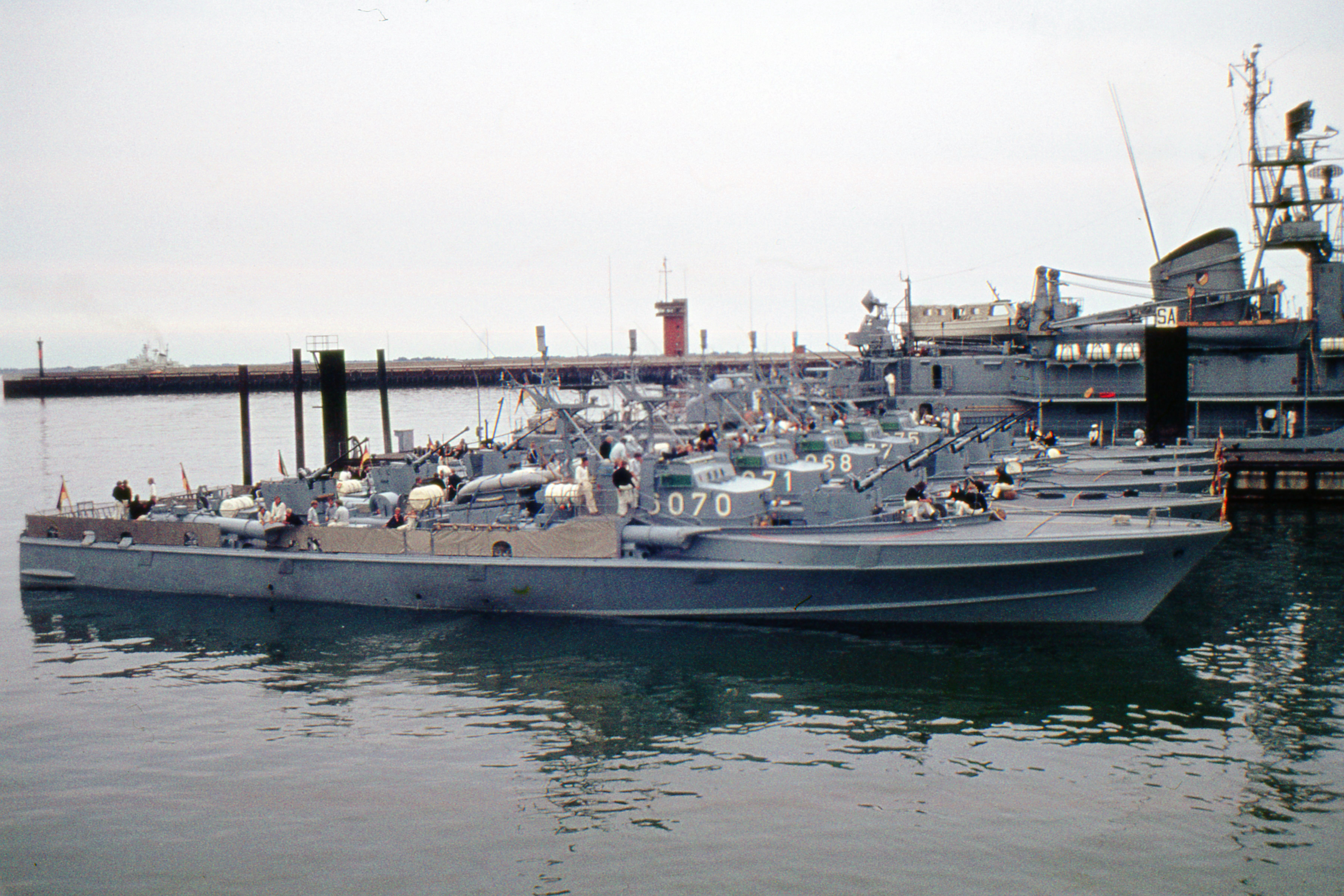
Seeadler class

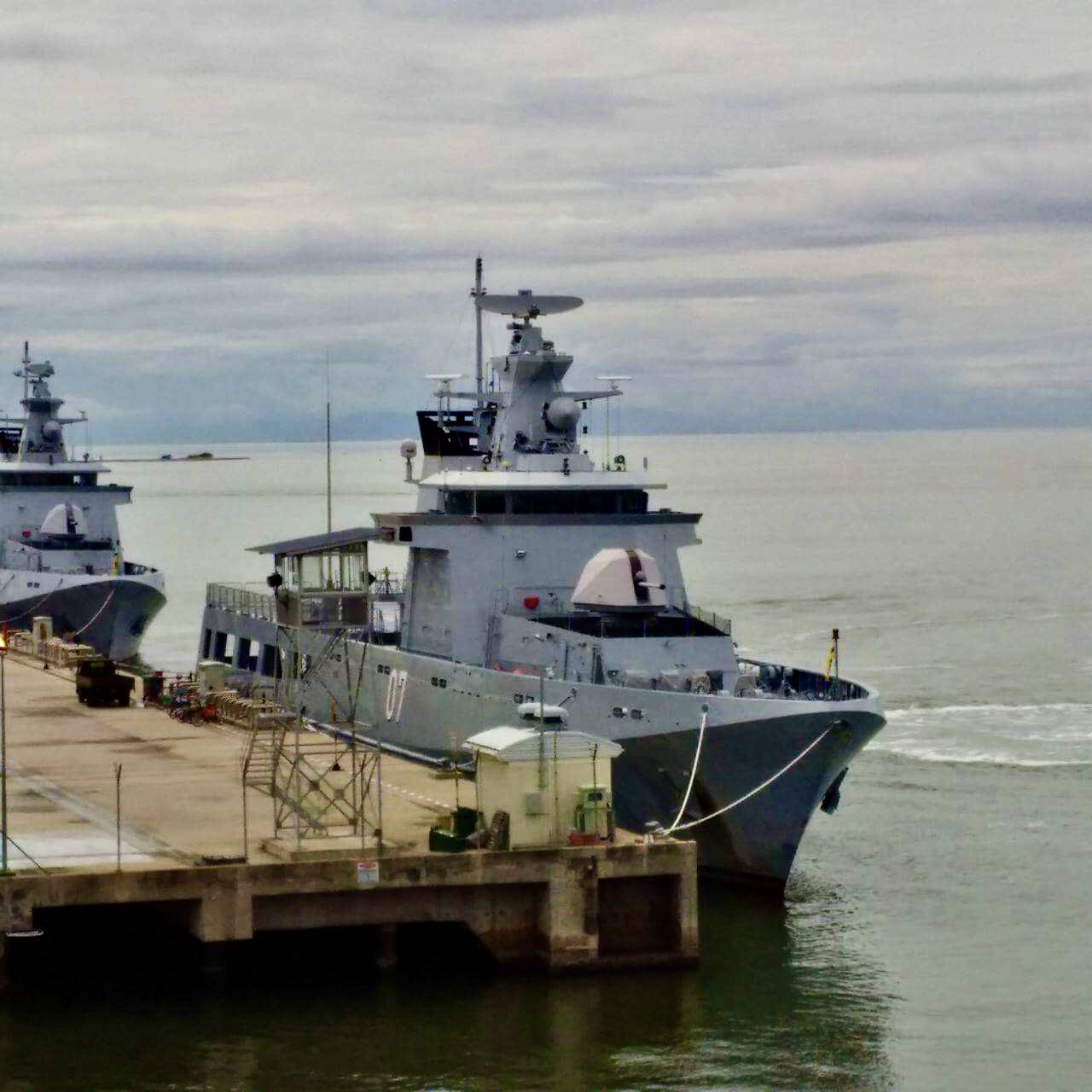
Darussalam class

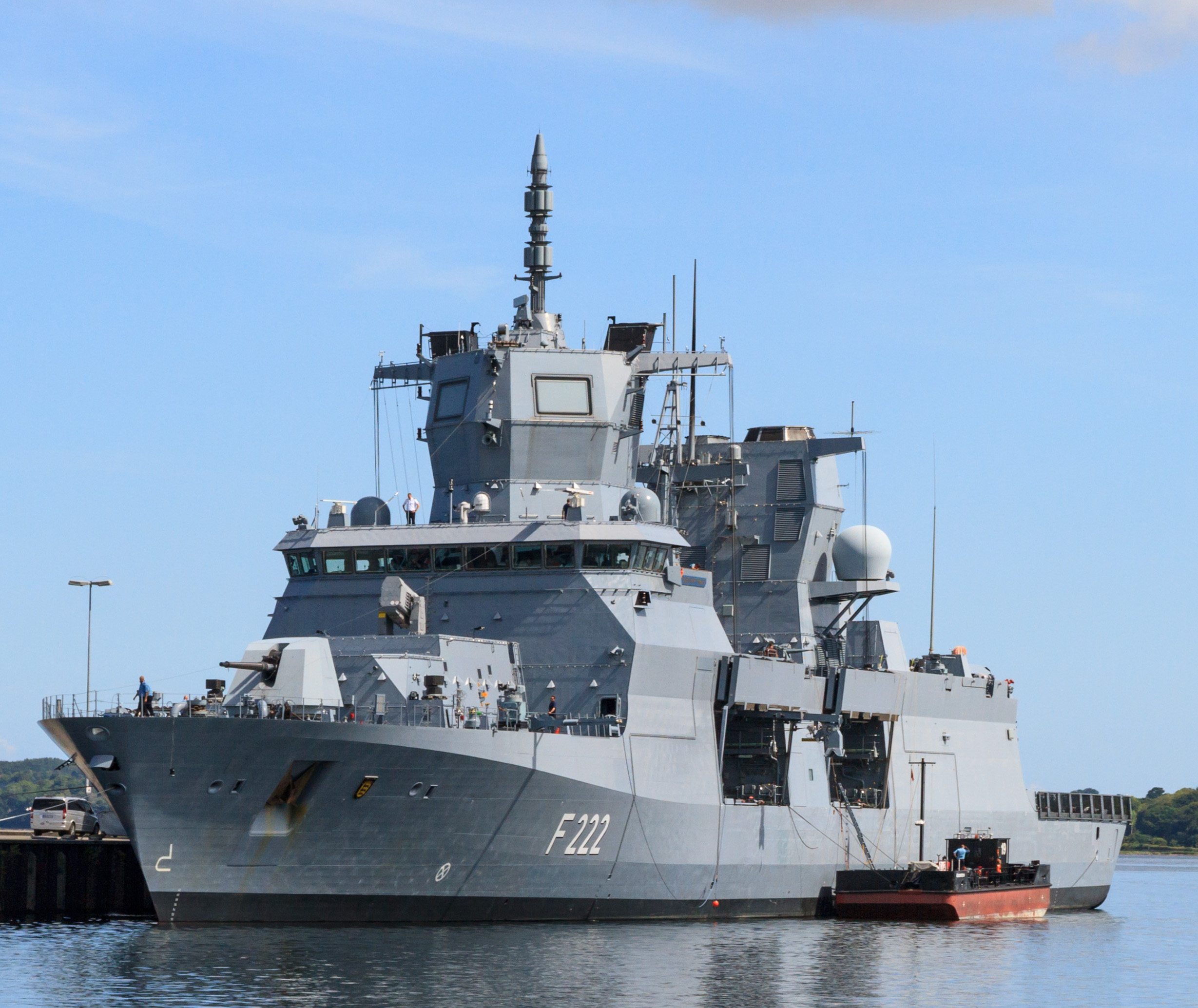
Baden-Württemberg class

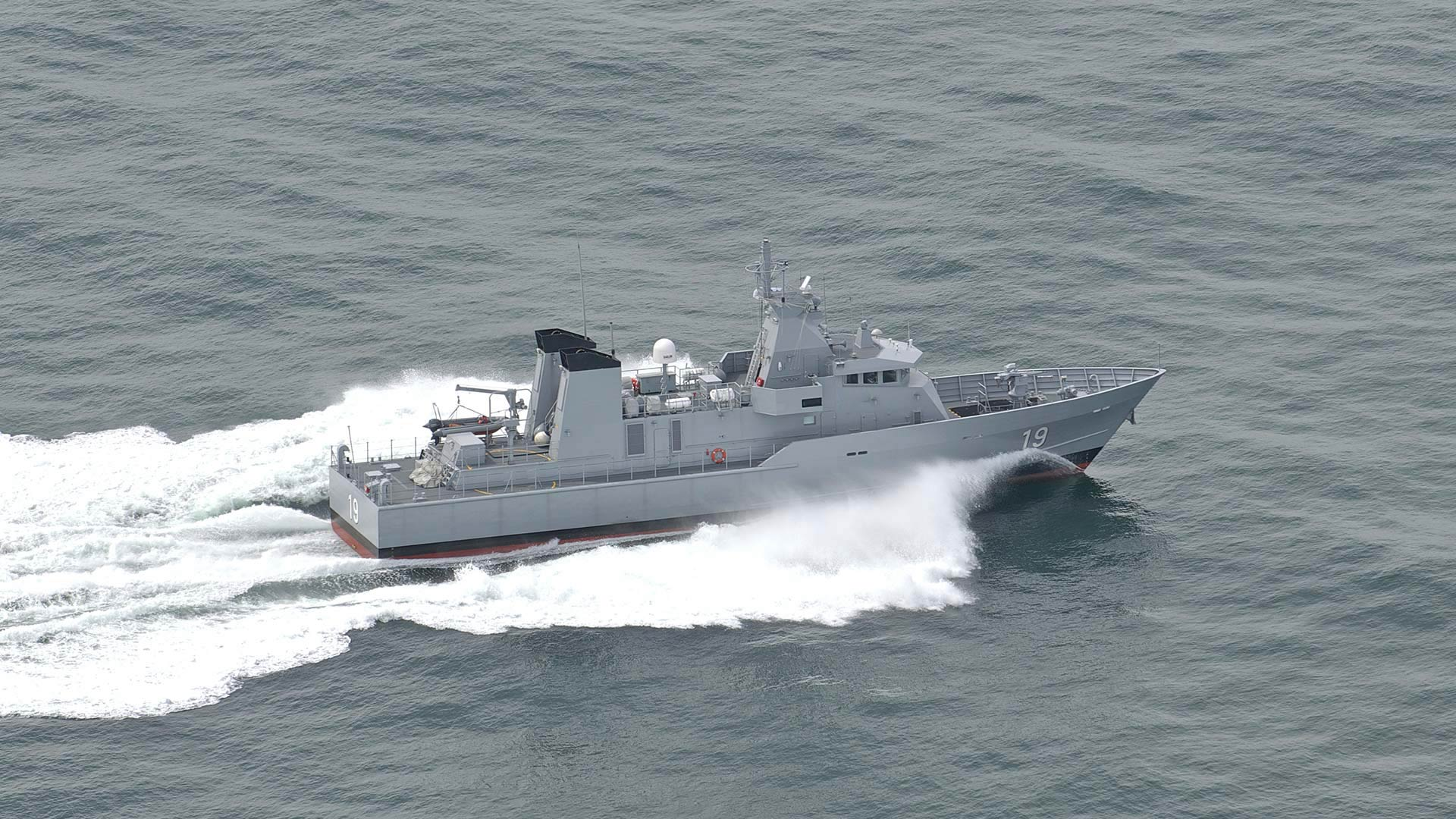
Ijtihad class

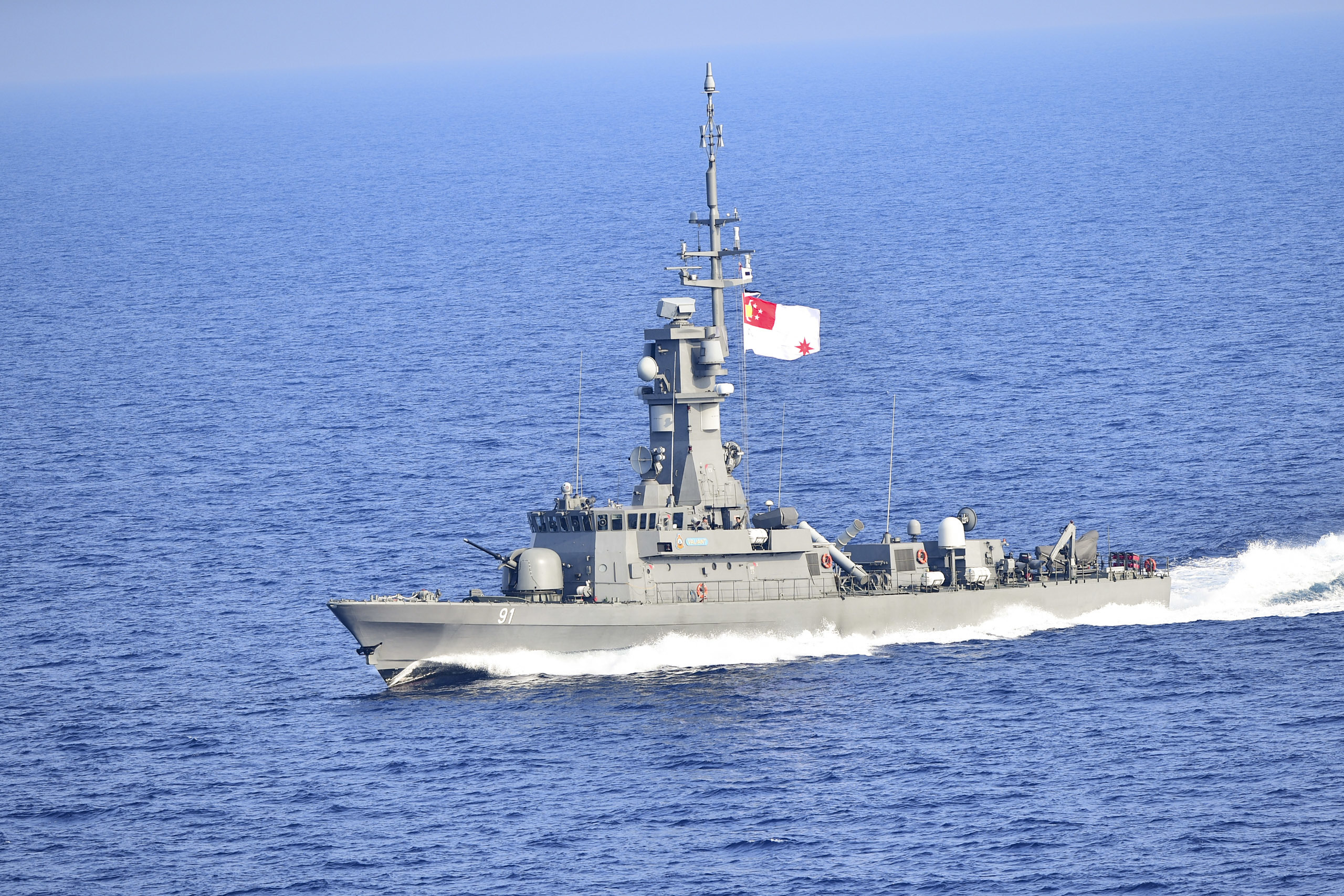
Victory class

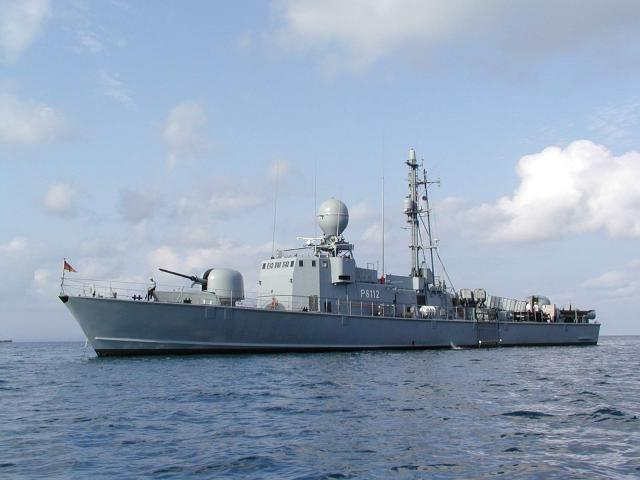
Albatros class

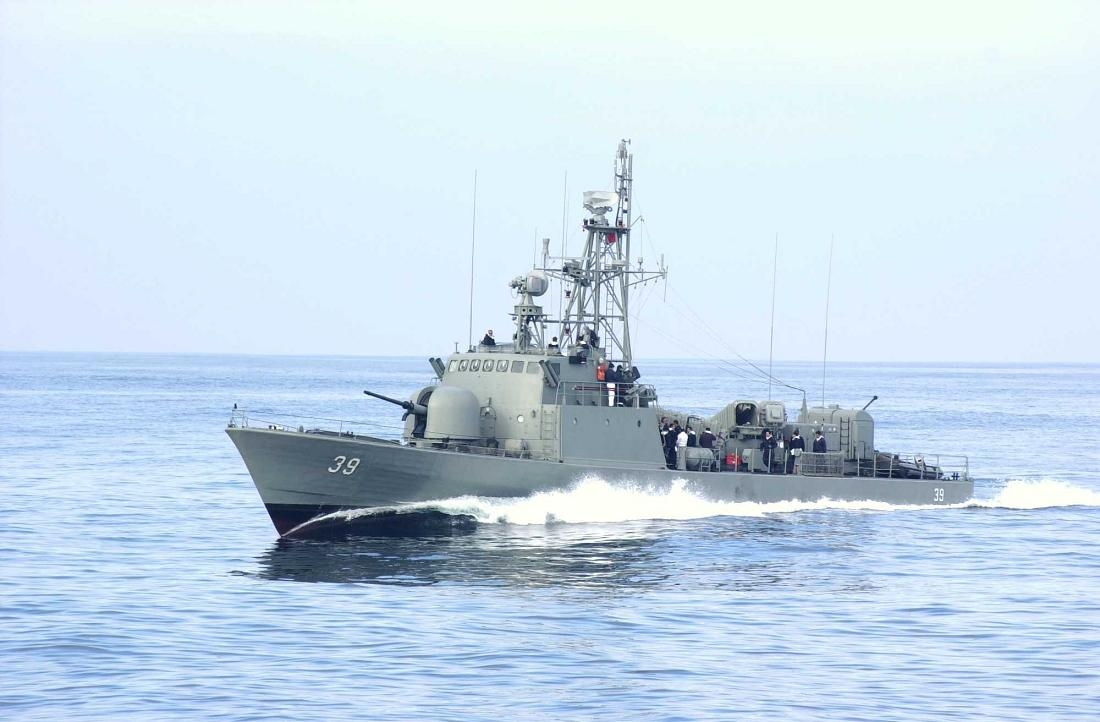
Tiger class

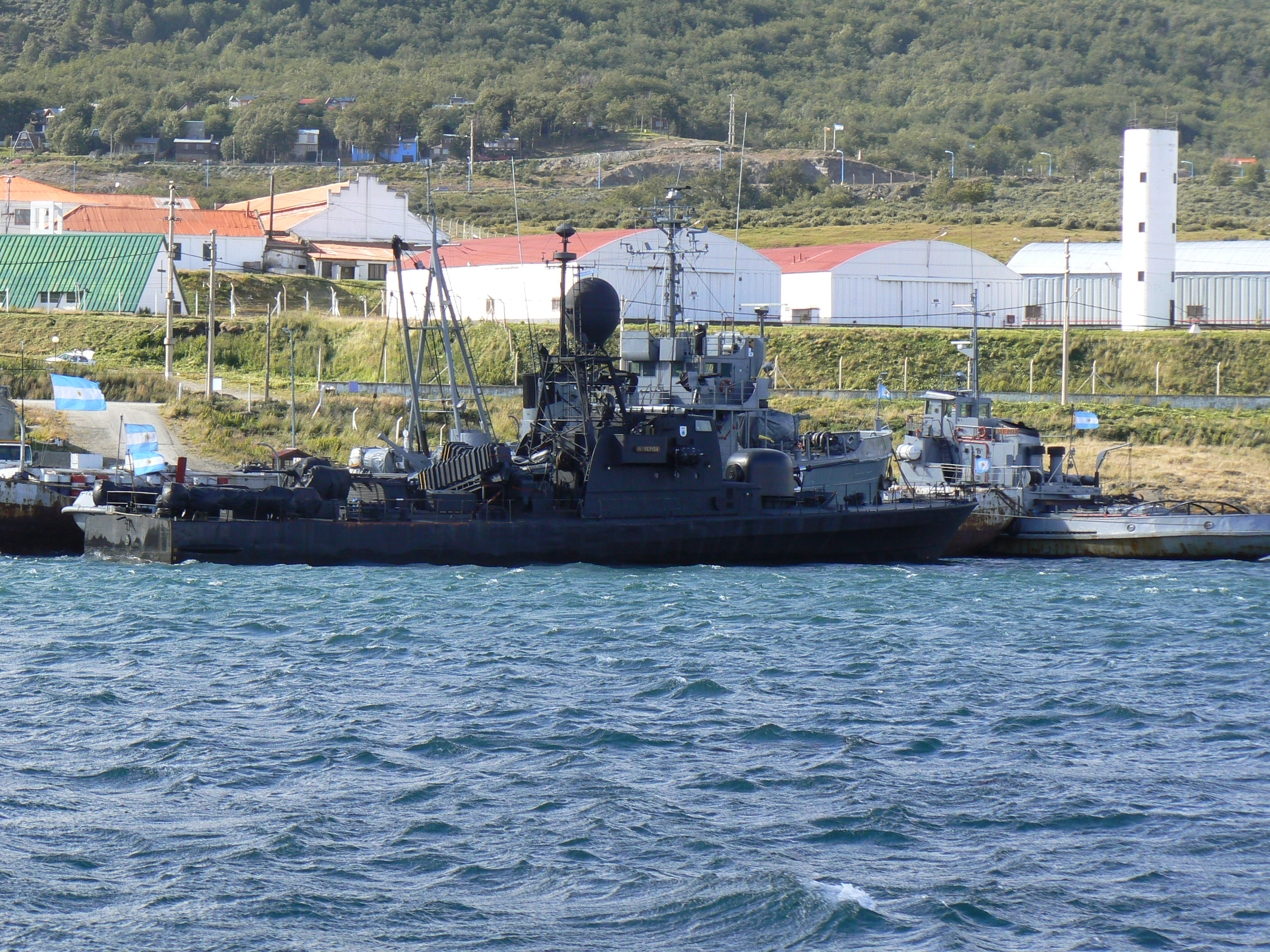
Intrépida class

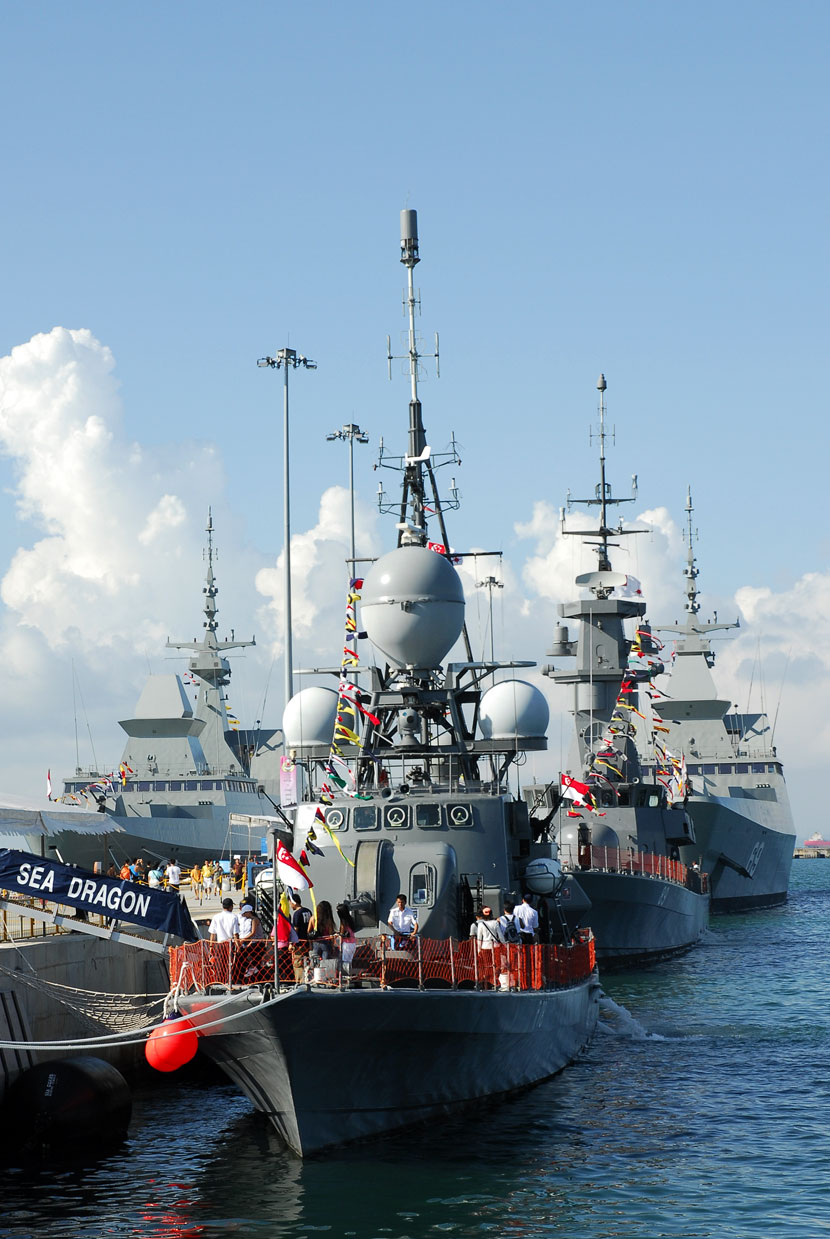
Seawolf-class

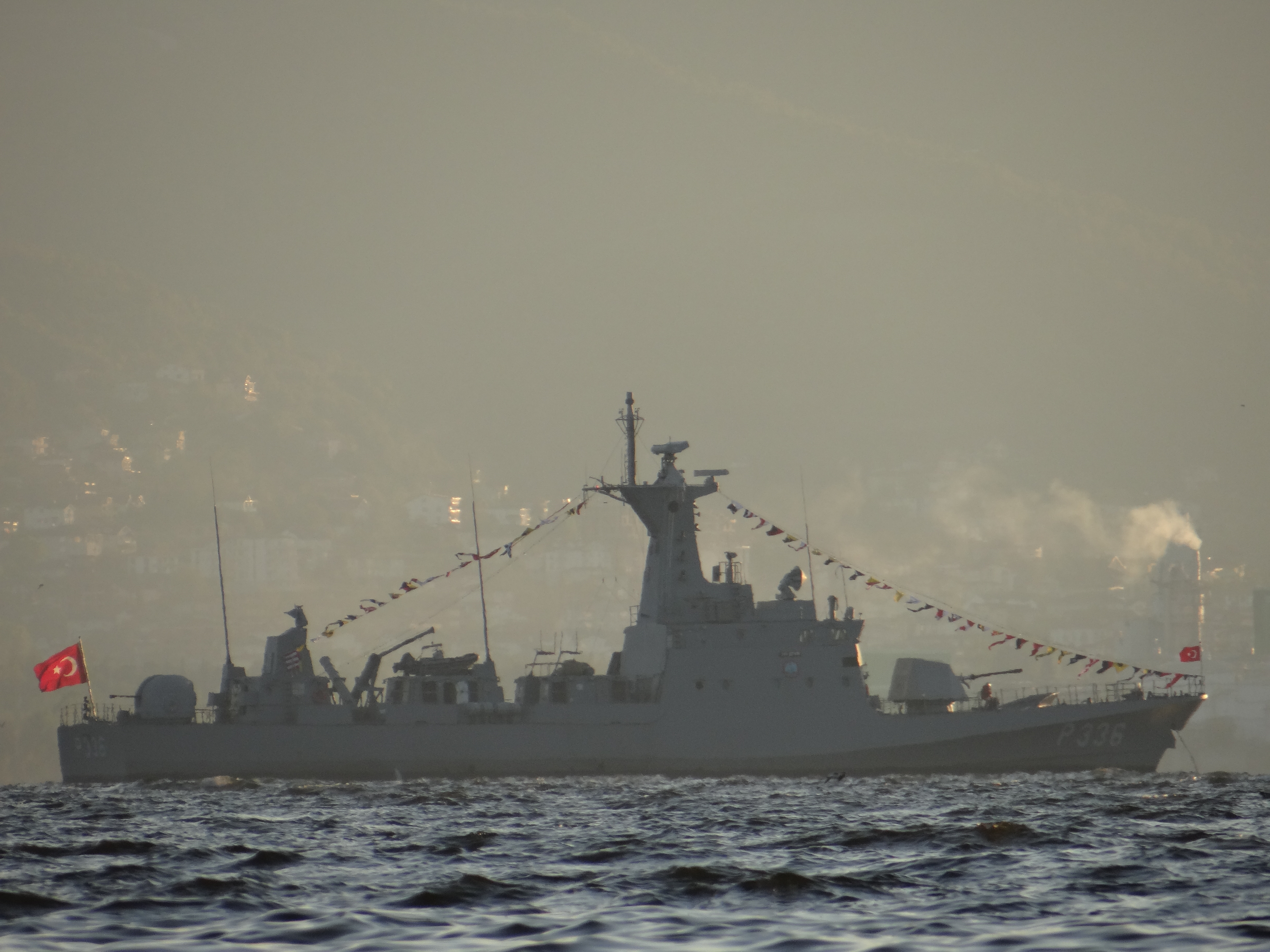
Kılıç class

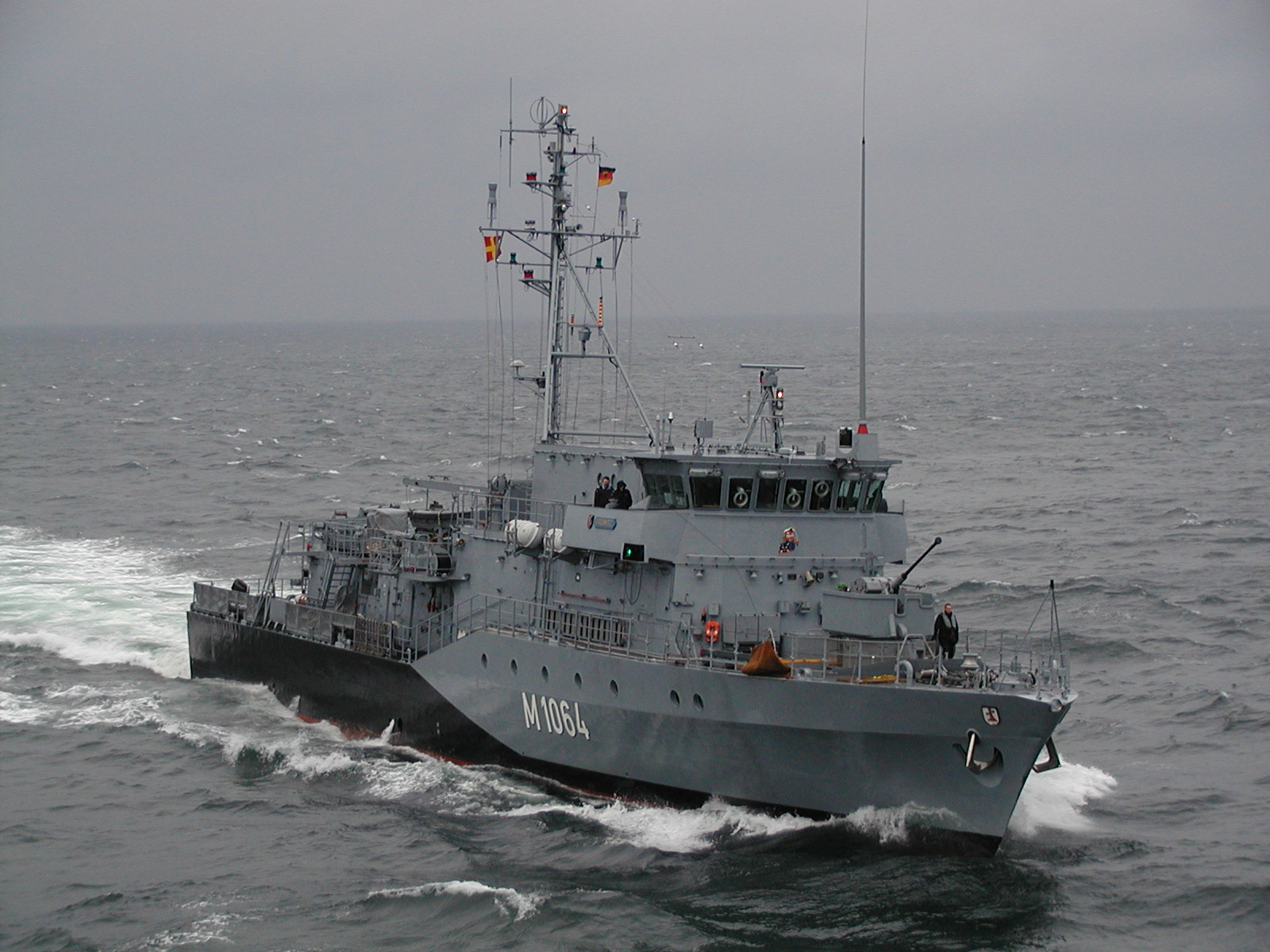
Frankenthal class

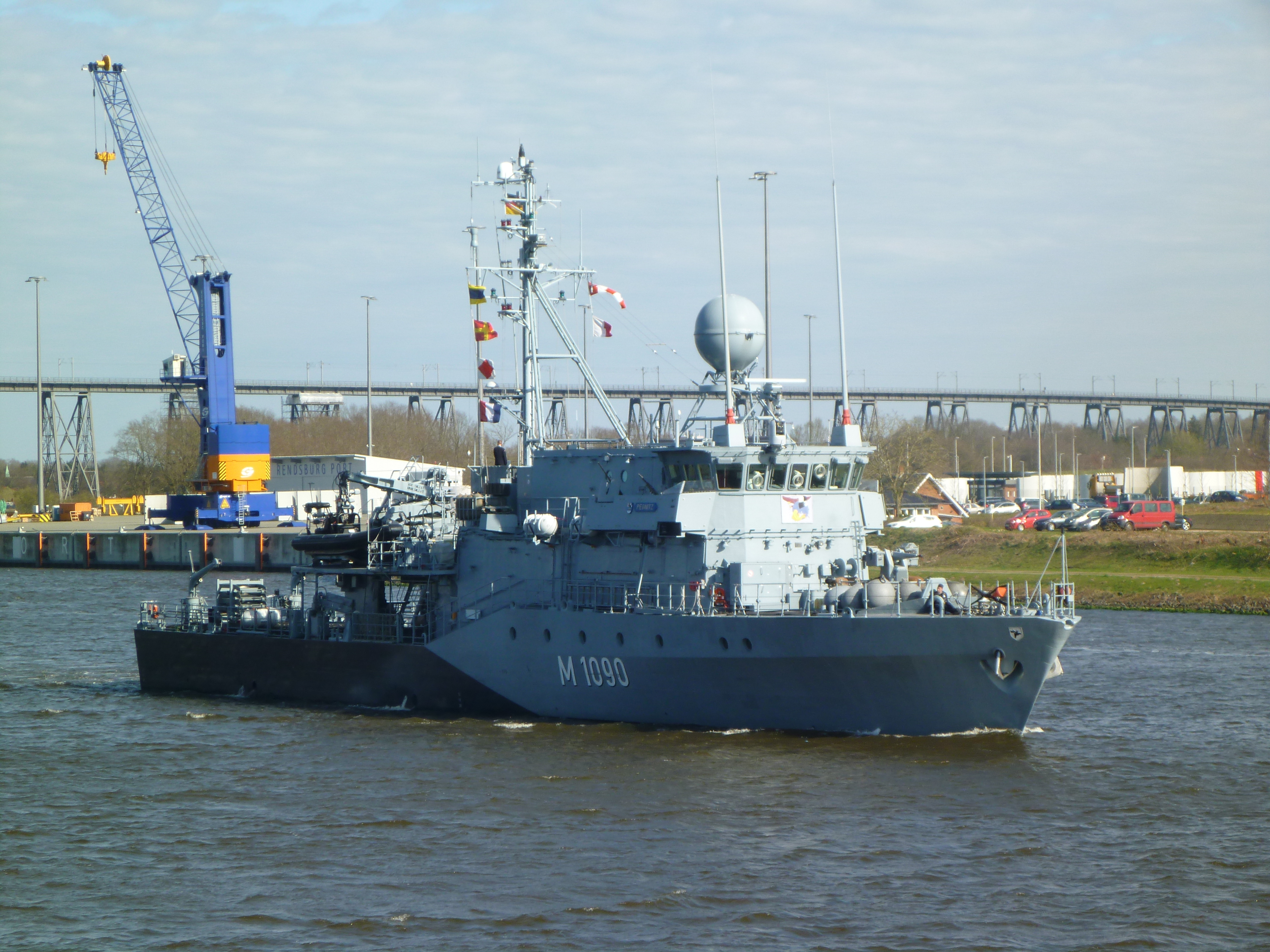
Ensdorf class

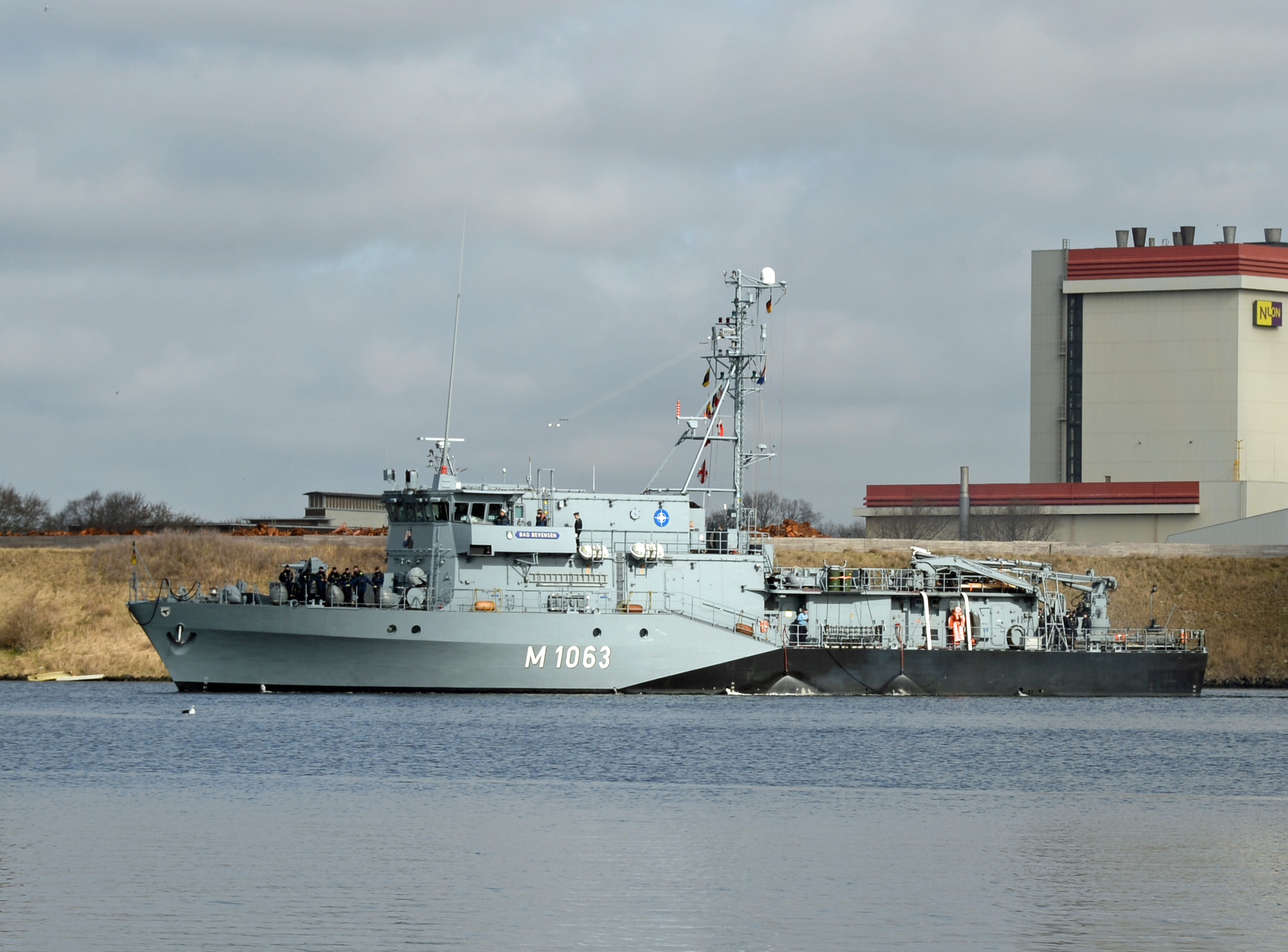
Frankenthal class

== See also ==
- E-boat
