= Zobel-class fast attack craft =

West German naval class (1961–1984)

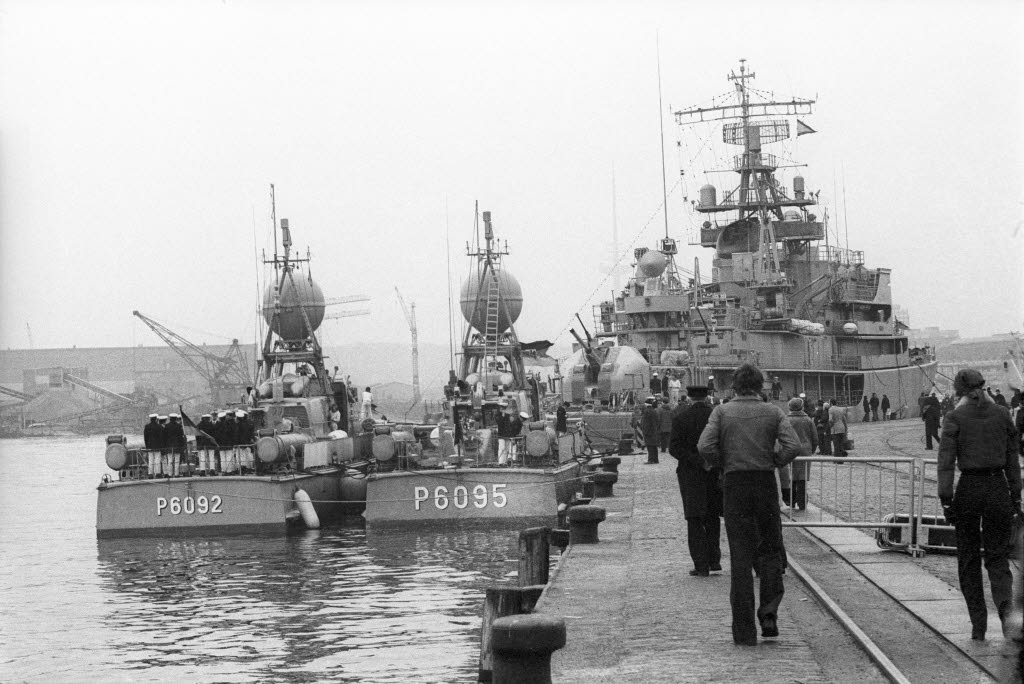
- Zobel-class fast attack craft Zobel and Hermelin in February 1977

Class overview
- Name: Zobel class
- Builders: Lürssen, Bremen-Vegesack
- Operators: German Navy; Turkish Navy
- Preceded by: Seeadler class
- Succeeded by: Tiger class
- In commission: 1961–1984
- Completed: 10
- Retired: 10

General characteristics
- Type: Torpedo boat (fast attack craft)
- Displacement: 172.5 tonnes standard, 190 tonnes full load
- Length: 42.6 metres (140 ft)
- Beam: 7.1 metres (23 ft)
- Draught: 2.3 metres (7.5 ft)
- Propulsion: 4 × Mercedes-Benz MB 518 B diesel engines, 3000PS each; 4 × propeller shafts, driving three-bladed propellers of 1.15m diameter; Bunker: 25t fuel, 1.12t lubricants, 2t fresh water
- Speed: 42kts max, 39kts max sustained
- Range: 700nms at 35knots
- Complement: 39 (4 Officers, 17 NCOs, 18 enlisted)
- Sensors & processing systems: Navigation radar, Surveillance radar
- Armament: 2 × Bofors 40mm gun, 3168 rounds of ammunition; 4 × 533mm torpedo tubes, 4 torpedoes; Minelaying capabilities: The aft 2 torpedo tubes can be exchanged with 2 ramps for 23 naval mines Mk 2; 4 × depth charges

The Type 142 Zobel class was a German class of torpedo bearing fast attack craft (torpedo boats). They were in service with the Bundesmarine during the Cold War to protect the Baltic sea coast. The class was designed by Lürssen.

The Zobel class was replaced by the Type 143A Gepard class, they were the last fast attack craft with only torpedoes as main armament, all later classes have anti-ship missiles.

The Kartal-class fast attack craft of the Turkish Navy is an advanced version of the Zobel class; vessels of this class are armed with Penguin anti-ship missiles and mines in addition to torpedoes.

== List of ships ==
NATO pennant number	German pennant number	Name	Callsign	Shipbuilder	Com- missioned	Decom- missioned	Fate
P6092	S31	Zobel (Sable)	DBUQ	Lürssen	12 December 1961	7 September 1982	
P6093	S32	Wiesel (Weasel)	DBUR	Lürssen	25 June 1962	6 March 1984	To Turkish Navy
P6094	S33	Dachs (Badger)	DBUS	Lürssen	25 September 1962	6 December 1984	To Turkish Navy
P6096	S34	Nerz (Mink)	DBUX	Lürssen	11 January 1963	8 July 1982	
P6098	S35	Gepard (Cheetah)	DBUW	Lürssen	18 April 1963	9 November 1982	To Turkish Navy
P6100	S36	Frettchen (Ferret)	DBUY	Lürssen	26 June 1963	9 August 1983	To Turkish Navy
P6101	S37	Ozelot (Ocelot)	DBUZ	Lürssen	25 October 1963	10 January 1984	To Turkish Navy
P6095	S38	Hermelin (Stoat)	DBUT	Kröger	28 November 1962	12 January 1983	
P6097	S39	Puma	DBUV	Kröger	21 December 1962	17 December 1981	Sold as scrap Recovered from Itchen River, Southampton, in 2009 for recovery of engines and mechanical components for restoration of German fast attack craft UW10, with hull to be converted as houseboat.
P6099	S40	Hyäne (Hyena)	DBUU	Kröger	10 May 1963	5 June 1984	To Turkish Navy

In service with the Bundesmarine, the vessels belonged to the 7. Schnellbootgeschwader (7th Fast attack craft squadron) based in Kiel at the Baltic Sea.
