= Friedrich Lürssen =

German design engineer

Friedrich Lürssen (1 March 1851 in Lemwerder – 30 November 1916 in Bremen) was a German shipbuilder and company founder of the German company Lürssen. He constructed the first motorboat for inventor Gottlieb Daimler.

== Life ==
On 27 June 1875, the 24 year-old Friedrich Lürssen set up a boatbuilding workshop in Aumund, a suburb of Bremen, Germany. His first vessel demonstrates his trademark: originality and high-quality. Friedrich Lürssen's shipyard grew and thrived, and at one point he also began placing orders with his father. Lürssen won several trophies in boat racing.

Eleven years later, in 1886, Friedrich Lürssen built the world's first motorboat. The 6-meter REMS was commissioned by the inventor and engine manufacturer Gottlieb Daimler, who needed a boat to put his new engine through its paces. Friedrich Lürssen, always open to new ideas, designed and built it without delay. This motorboat was first tested on the German river Neckar.

He was married and his son Otto (1880–1932) worked for the Lürssen company.
