= List of naval ship classes of Germany =

The list of naval ship classes of Germany includes all classes of naval ships produced or operated in Germany from the late 19th century to modern day.

See also:

- List of naval ships of Germany for a list of individual ships
- List of German Navy ship classes for modern German type classifications

== Aircraft carriers ==
=== Graf Zeppelin class ===
- Displacement: 23,200 tons
- Armament: 16 x 15 cm guns, 10 x 10.5 cm guns, 22 x 3.7 cm AA guns, 28 x 2 cm AA guns
- Aircraft: Up to 37, including Bf 109T, Ju 87C, and Fi 167
- Performance: Speed 35 knots (65 km/h); Range 8,000 nautical miles (15,000 km) at 19 knots (35 km/h)
- Ships in class: 2: Graf Zeppelin and Flugzeugträger B
- Service: Neither vessel was commissioned into service

== Surface combatants ==
=== Battleships (Schlachtschiffe) ===
See list of battleships of Germany for detailed listings

- H class
- Bismarck class
- Scharnhorst class
- L 20e α class
- Bayern class
- König class
- Kaiser class
- Helgoland class
- Nassau class
- Deutschland class
- Braunschweig class
- Wittelsbach class
- Kaiser Friedrich III class
- Brandenburg class

=== Battlecruisers (Schlachtkreuzer) ===
- Ersatz Yorck class
- Mackensen class
- Derfflinger class
- SMS Seydlitz
- Moltke class
- SMS Von der Tann

=== Coastal defense ships (Küstenpanzerschiffe) ===
==== SMS Oldenburg ====
- Displacement: 5,652 tons
- Armament: 8 x 24 cm guns
- Armor:
- Performance: Speed 13.5 knots (25 km/h)
- Ships in class: 1: Oldenburg
- Service: Launched 1884

==== Siegfried class ====
- Displacement: 3,740 tons
- Armament: 3 x 24 cm guns; 10 x 8.8 cm guns; 4 x 45 cm torpedo tubes
- Armor: 530 mm belt; 200 mm turret; 50 mm deck
- Performance: Speed 15 knots (28 km/h); Range 1,490 nautical miles (2,760 km) at 10 knots (19 km/h)
- Ships in class: 6: Siegfried, Beowulf, Frithjof, Heimdall, Hildebrand, Hagen
- Service: Commissioned 1890 to 1896

==== Odin class ====
- Displacement: 3,740 tons - 4,250 tons
- Armament: 3 x 24 cm guns; 8-10 x 8.8 cm guns; 3-4 x 45 cm torpedo tubes
- Armor: 530 mm belt; 200 mm turret; 50 mm deck
- Performance: Speed 15 knots (28 km/h); Range 1,490 nautical miles (2,760 km) at 10 knots (19 km/h)
- Ships in class: 2: Odin, and Ägir
- Service: Commissioned 1890 to 1896

=== Heavy cruisers (Schwere Kreuzer) ===
==== Admiral Hipper class ====
- Displacement: 18,200 tons (18,400 tons for Prinz Eugen)
- Armament: 8 x 20 cm (8") guns; 12 x 10.5 cm guns; 6 x 4 cm AA guns; 8 x 3.7 cm AA guns; 32 x 2 cm AA guns; 12 x 53 cm (21") torpedo tubes (Prinz Eugen shipped 17 x 4 cm guns, 28 x 2 cm guns, and no 3.7 cm guns)
- Armor: 80 mm belt; 105 mm turret; 50 mm deck
- Performance: Speed 32 knots (59 km/h); Range 8,000 nautical miles (15,000 km) at 20 knots (Prinz Eugen speed was 33 knots (61 km/h) and range was 7,200 nautical miles (13,330 km) at 20 knots)
- Ships in class: 5: Admiral Hipper, Blücher, Prinz Eugen, Seydlitz, and Lützow
- Service: Three ships completed, commissioned 1939 to 1940, two lost in World War II

==== Deutschland class ====
- Displacement: 14,500 tons
- Armament: 6 x 28 cm (11") guns; 8 x 15 cm guns; 6 x 8.8 cm guns; 8 x 3.7 cm AA guns; 8 x 2 cm AA guns; 8 x 53 cm (21") torpedo tubes
- Armor: 80 mm belt; 140 mm turret; 40 mm deck
- Performance: Speed 28 knots (52 km/h); Range 18,650 nautical miles (34,540 km) at 15 knots (28 km/h)
- Ships in class: 3: Deutschland (renamed Lützow), Admiral Scheer, and Admiral Graf Spee
- Service: Commissioned 1933 to 1936, both lost during World War II

=== Armored cruisers (Panzerkreuzer) ===
==== SMS Blücher ====
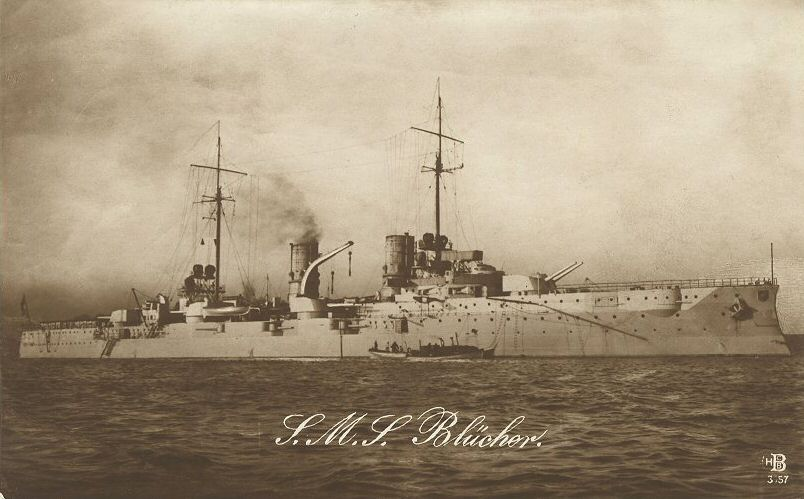
SMS Blücher

- Displacement: 17,500 tons
- Armament: 12 x 21 cm guns; 8 x 15 cm guns; 16 x 8.8 cm guns; 4 x 45 cm torpedo tubes
- Armor: 180 mm belt; 180 mm turret; 70 mm deck
- Performance: Speed 26 knots (48 km/h); Range 6,600 nautical miles (12,220 km) at 12 knots (22 km/h)
- Ships in class: 1
- Service: Commissioned 1909, sunk 1915

==== Scharnhorst class ====
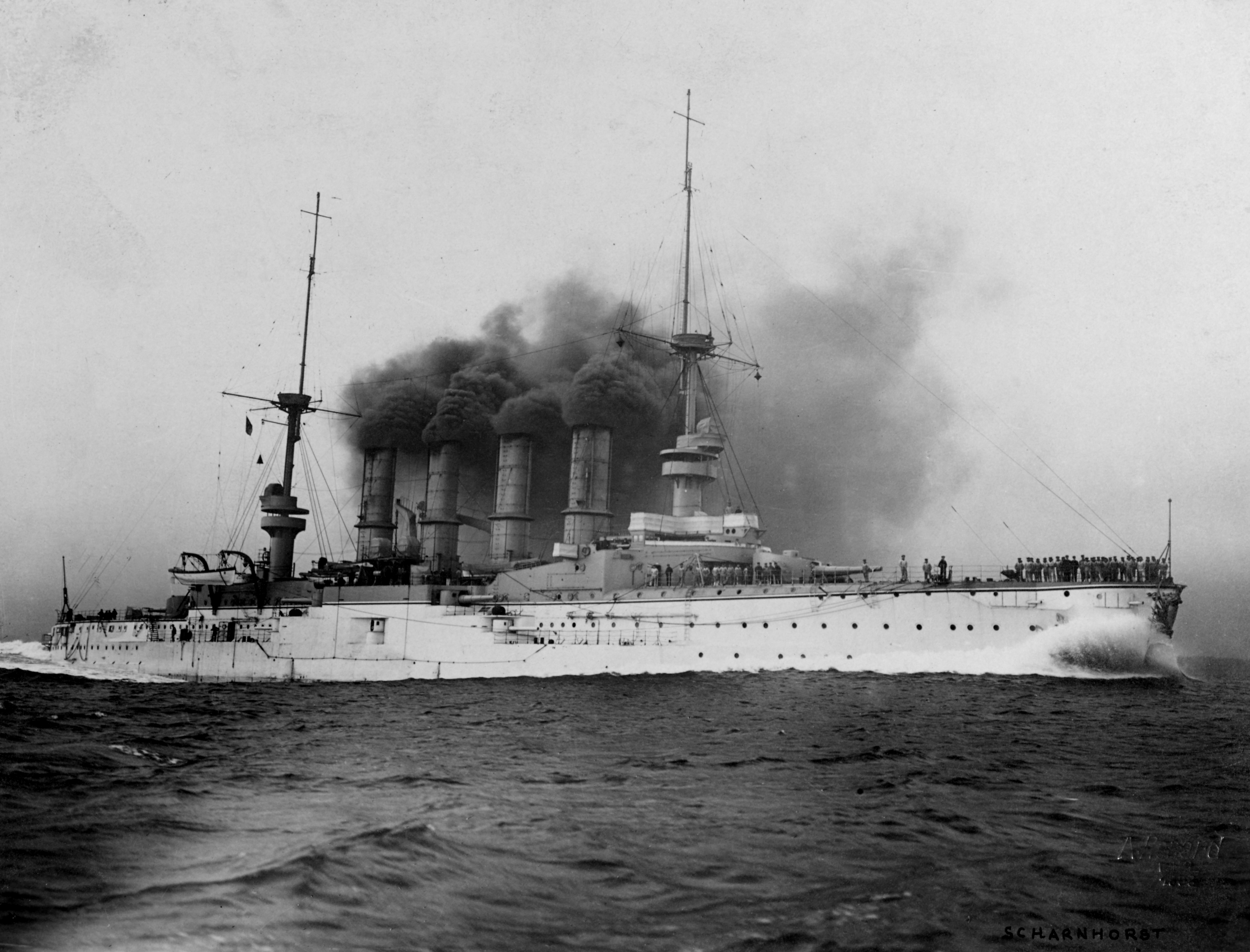
SMS Scharnhorst

- Displacement: 12,985 tons
- Armament: 8 x 21 cm guns; 6 x 15 cm guns; 18 x 8.8 cm guns; 4 x 3.7 cm guns; 4 x machineguns; 4 x 45 cm torpedo tubes
- Armor: 150 mm belt; 170 mm turret; 70 mm deck
- Performance: Speed 23 knots (43 km/h); Range 5,120 nautical miles (9,480 km) at 12 knots (22 km/h)
- Ships in class: 2: Scharnhorst and Gneisenau
- Service: Commissioned 1907 to 1908, both lost in World War I at the Battle of the Falkland Islands

==== Roon class ====
- Displacement: 10,266 tons
- Armament: 4 x 21 cm guns; 10 x 15 cm guns; 14 x 8.8 cm guns; 4 x 3.7 cm guns; 4 x 45 cm torpedo tubes
- Armor: 100 mm belt; 150 mm turret; 60 mm deck
- Performance: Speed 21 knots (39 km/h); Range 4,200 nautical miles (7,780 km) at 12 knots (22 km/h)
- Ships in class: 2: Roon and Yorck
- Service: Commissioned 1905 to 1906, Yorck lost in World War I

==== Prinz Adalbert class ====
- Displacement: 9,800 tons
- Armament: 4 x 21 cm guns; 10 x 15 cm guns; 12 x 8.8 cm guns; 4 x 3.7 cm guns; 4 x 45 cm torpedo tubes
- Armor: 100 mm belt; 150 mm turret; 60 mm deck
- Performance: Speed 20 knots (37 km/h); Range 4,200 nautical miles (7,780 km) at 12 knots (22 km/h)
- Ships in class: 2: Prinz Adalbert and Friedrich Carl
- Service: Commissioned 1903 to 1904, both lost in World War I

==== SMS Prinz Heinrich ====
- Displacement: 9,800 tons
- Armament: 2 x 24 cm guns; 10 x 15 cm guns; 10 x 8.8 cm guns; 10 x 3.7 cm guns; 4 x 45 cm torpedo tubes
- Armor: 100 mm turret; 50 mm deck
- Performance: Speed 20 knots (37 km/h); Range 4,580 nautical miles (8,480 km) at 10 knots (19 km/h)
- Ships in class: 1
- Service: Commissioned 1902

==== SMS Fürst Bismarck ====
- Displacement: 11,460 tons
- Armament: 4 x 24 cm guns; 12 x 15 cm guns; 10 x 8.8 cm guns; 4 x machineguns; 6 x 45 cm torpedo tubes
- Armor: 200 mm belt; 200 mm turret; 50 mm deck
- Performance: Speed 18 knots (33 km/h); Range 4,560 nautical miles (8,450 km) at 10 knots (19 km/h)
- Ships in class: 1
- Service: Commissioned 1900

=== Protected cruisers (Geschützte Kreuzer) ===
==== Victoria Louise class ====
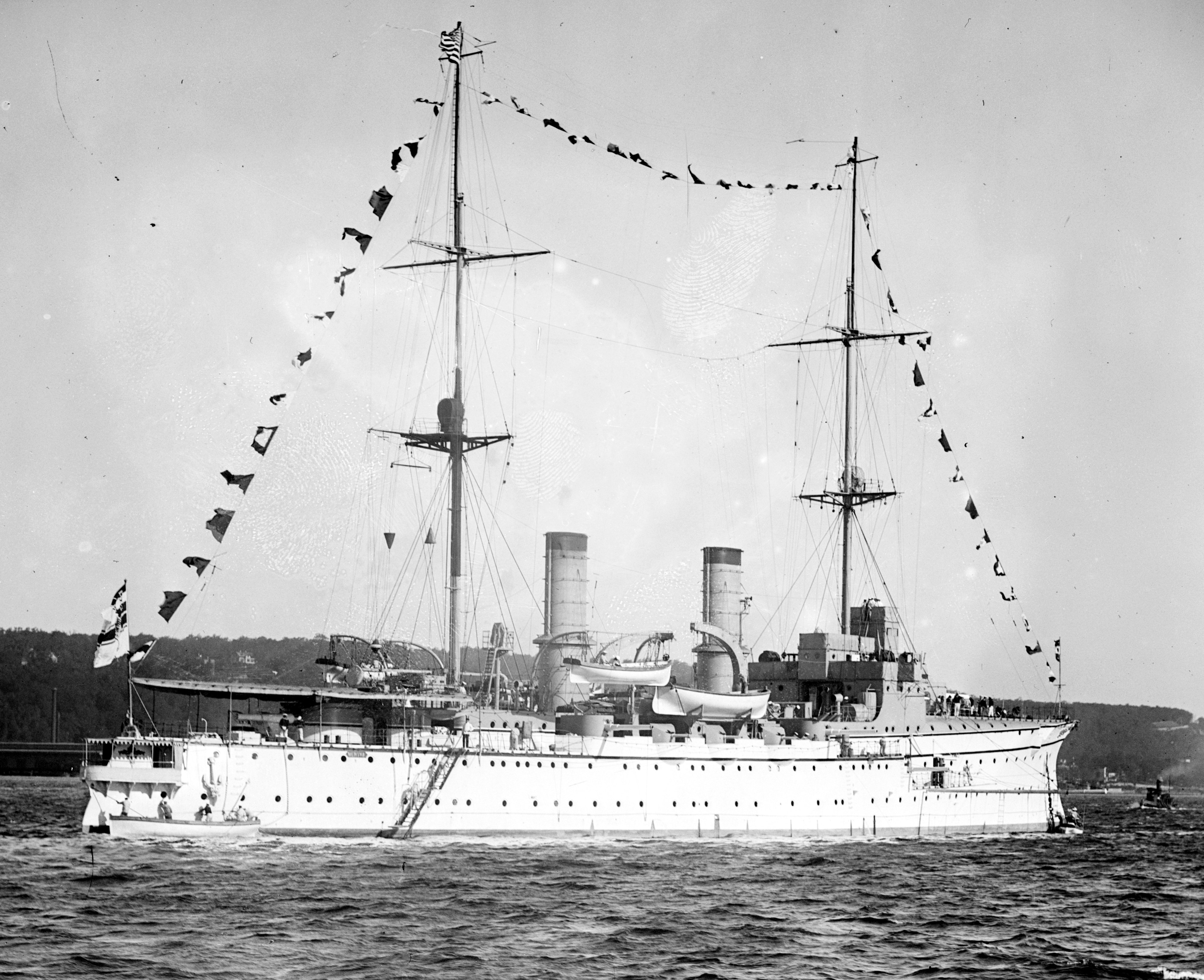
SMS Hertha

- Displacement: 6,790 tons
- Armament: 2 x 21 cm (8") guns; 6 x 15 cm guns; 10 x 8.8 cm guns; 4 x machineguns; 5 x 45 cm torpedo tubes
- Armor: 100 mm turret; 100 mm deck
- Performance: Speed 19 knots (35 km/h); Range 3,400 nautical miles (6,300 km) at 12 knots (22 km/h)
- Ships in class: 5: Victoria Louise, Hertha, Freya, Vineta, and Hansa
- Service: Commissioned 1899

==== SMS Kaiserin Augusta ====
- Displacement: 6,300 tons
- Armament: 4 x 15 cm guns; 6 x 10 cm guns; 5 x 35 cm torpedo tubes (1896 modification added 8 x 15 cm guns and 8 x 8.8 cm guns, removed all 10 cm guns; 1916 modification added 4 x 10 cm guns and 1 x 8.8 cm gun, removed 11 x 15 cm guns and all torpedo tubes)
- Armor: 70 mm deck
- Performance: Speed 21 knots (39 km/h); Range 3,240 nautical miles (6,000 km) at 12 knots (22 km/h)
- Ships in class: 1
- Service: Commissioned 1895

==== Irene class ====
- Displacement: 5,027 tons
- Armament: 12 x 15 cm guns; 6 x 3.7 cm guns; 3 x 35 cm torpedo tubes
- Armor: 75 mm deck
- Performance: Speed 18 knots (33 km/h); Range 2,490 nautical miles (4,610 km) at 9 knots (17 km/h)
- Ships in class: 2: Irene, Prinzess Wilhelm
- Service: Commissioned 1888

=== Light cruisers (Leichte Kreuzer) ===
==== Leipzig class ====
- Displacement: 8,400 tons (9,000 tons for Nürnberg)
- Armament: 9 x 15 cm (6") guns; 6 x 8.8 cm guns; 8 x 3.7 cm guns; 4 x 2 cm guns; 12 x 53 cm (21") torpedo tubes; 120 mines (Nürnberg shipped an additional 2 x 8.8 cm guns and 2 x 4 cm AA guns)
- Aircraft: 2 catapult launched Arado Ar 196
- Armor: 50 mm belt; 30 mm turret; 20 mm deck
- Performance: Speed 32 knots (59 km/h); Range 5,700 nautical miles (10,560 km) at 19 knots (35 km/h)
- Ships in class: 2: Leipzig and Nürnberg
- Service: Commissioned 1931 and 1935, Leipzig damaged in 1944 in collision and reduced to flak ship, both survived World War II

==== Königsberg class ====
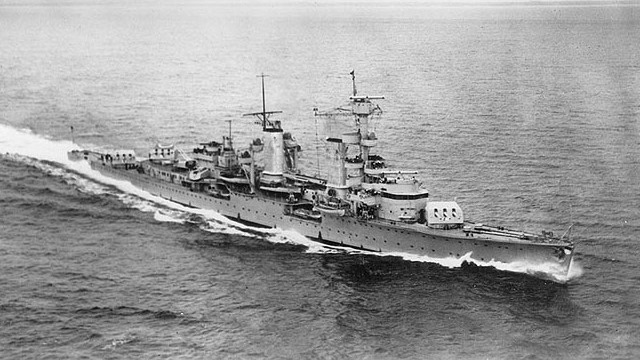
SMS Köln

- Displacement: 7,700 tons
- Armament: 9 x 15 cm (6") guns; 2 x 8.8 cm guns; 12 x 50 cm torpedo tubes; 120 mines (1934 modification added 8 x 3.7 cm AA guns and replaced torpedoes with 53 cm tubes; 1940 modification added 4 x 8.8 cm guns; 1945 modification added 10 x 2 cm AA guns)
- Armor: 70 mm belt; 20 mm turret; 40 mm deck
- Performance: Speed 32 knots (59 km/h); Range 7,300 nautical miles (13,520 km) at 17 knots (31 km/h)
- Ships in class: 3: Königsberg, Köln, Karlsruhe
- Service: Commissioned 1929 to 1930, all lost in World War II

==== Cöln class ====
- Displacement: 7,485 tons
- Armament: 8 x 15 cm guns; 3 x 8.8 cm guns; 4 x 60 cm torpedo tubes; 200 mines
- Performance: Speed 29 knots (54 km/h); Range 6,000 nautical miles (11,000 km) at 12 knots (22 km/h)
- Ships in class: 10: Cöln, Dresden, Wiesbaden, Magdeburg, Leipzig, Rostock, Frauenlob, Ersatz Köln, Ersatz Emden, and Ersatz Karlsruhe
- Service: Seven launched, two commissioned 1918, both scuttled at Scapa Flow

==== Königsberg class ====
- Displacement: 7,125 tons
- Armament: 8 x 15 cm guns; 2 x 8.8 cm guns; 4 x 50 cm torpedo tubes; 200 mines
- Armor: 60 mm belt; 40 mm deck
- Performance: Speed 28 knots (52 km/h); Range 4,850 nautical miles (8,980 km) at 12 knots (22 km/h)
- Ships in class: 4: Königsberg, Emden, Karlsruhe, and Nürnberg
- Service: Commissioned 1916 to 1917, two scuttled at Scapa Flow

==== Emden ====
- Displacement: 7,100 tons
- Armament: 8 x 15 cm (6") guns; 3 x 8.8 cm guns; 6 x 2 cm AA guns; 4 x 50 cm torpedo tubes; 120 mines (1944 modification replaced 8.8 cm guns with 10.5 cm guns, added 2 x 3.7 cm AA guns and 14 x 2 cm AA guns, and replaced torpedoes with 53 cm (21") tubes)
- Armor: 50 mm belt; 40 mm deck
- Performance: Speed 29 knots (54 km/h); Range 6,750 nautical miles (12,500 km) at 14 knots (26 km/h)
- Ships in class: 1
- Service: Commissioned 1925, damaged by bombing April 1945, scuttled May 1945

==== Graudenz class ====
- Displacement: 6,380 tons
- Armament: 12 x 10.5 cm guns; 2 x 50 cm torpedo tubes; 120 mines (1915 modification replaced 10.5 cm guns with 7 x 15 cm guns and added 2 x 8.8 cm guns and 2 x 50 cm tubes)
- Armor: 60 mm belt; 40 mm deck
- Performance: Speed 27 knots (50 km/h); Range 5,500 nautical miles (10,190 km) at 12 knots (22 km/h)
- Ships in class: 2: Graudenz and Regensburg
- Service: Commissioned 1914 to 1915, one lost in World War II

==== Karlsruhe class ====
- Displacement: 6,190 tons
- Armament: 12 x 10.5 cm guns; 2 x 45 cm torpedo tubes
- Armor: 60 mm belt; 60 mm deck
- Performance: Speed 28 knots (52 km/h); Range 5,000 nautical miles (9,000 km) at 12 knots (22 km/h)
- Ships in class: 2: Karlsruhe and Rostock
- Service: Commissioned 1914, both lost in World War I

==== Brummer class ====
- Displacement: 5,850 tons
- Armament: 4 x 15 cm guns; 2 x 8.8 cm guns; 2 x 50 cm torpedo tubes; 400 mines
- Armor: 38 mm belt; 16 mm deck
- Performance: Speed 28 knots (52 km/h); Range 5,800 nautical miles (10,740 km) at 12 knots (22 km/h)
- Ships in class: 2: Brummer and Bremse
- Service: Commissioned 1916, both scuttled at Scapa Flow

==== Pillau class ====
- Displacement: 5,250 tons
- Armament: 8 x 15 cm guns; 4 x 5.2 cm guns; 2 x 50 cm torpedo tubes; 120 mines
- Armor: 80 mm deck
- Performance: Speed 27 knots (50 km/h); Range 4,300 nautical miles (7,960 km) at 12 knots (22 km/h)
- Ships in class: 2: Pillau and Elbing
- Service: Commissioned 1914 to 1915, one lost in World War I, one lost in World War II

==== Wiesbaden class ====
- Displacement: 5,200 tons
- Armament: 8 x 15 cm guns; 4 x 5.2 cm guns; 4 x 50 cm torpedo tubes; 120 mines
- Armor: 60 mm belt; 40 mm deck
- Performance: Speed 27 knots (50 km/h); Range 4,800 nautical miles (8,890 km) at 12 knots (22 km/h)
- Ships in class: 2: Wiesbaden and Frankfurt
- Service: Commissioned 1915, one lost in World War I

==== Kolberg class ====
- Displacement: 4,900 tons
- Armament: 12 x 10.5 cm guns; 4 x 5.2 cm guns; 2 x 45 cm torpedo tubes; 100 mines (1917 modification replaced 10.5 cm guns with 6 x 15 cm guns and 2 x 8.8 cm guns)
- Armor: 50 mm deck
- Performance: Speed 26 knots (48 km/h); Range 3,250 nautical miles (6,020 km) at 14 knots (26 km/h)
- Ships in class: 4: Kolberg, Augsburg, Cöln, and Mainz
- Service: Commissioned 1909 to 1911, two lost in World War I

==== Magdeburg class ====
- Displacement: 4,570 tons
- Armament: 12 x 10.5 cm guns; 2 x 50 cm torpedo tubes; 120 mines
- Armor: 60 mm belt; 40 mm deck
- Performance: Speed 27 knots (50 km/h); Range 5,820 nautical miles (10,780 km) at 12 knots (22 km/h)
- Ships in class: 4: Magdeburg, Breslau, Stralsund, and Strassburg
- Service: Commissioned 1912, two lost in World War I

==== SMS Gefion ====
- Displacement: 4,275 tons
- Armament: 10 x 10.5 cm guns; 6 x 5 cm guns; 2 x 45 cm torpedo tubes
- Performance: Speed 20 knots (37 km/h); Range 3,500 nautical miles (6,480 km) at 12 knots (22 km/h)
- Ships in class: 1
- Service: Commissioned 1894

==== Dresden class ====
- Displacement: 4,250 tons
- Armament: 10 x 10.5 cm guns; 10 x machineguns; 2 x 45 cm torpedo tubes
- Armor: 100 mm belt; 25 mm deck
- Performance: Speed 25 knots (46 km/h); Range 3,600 nautical miles (6,670 km) at 14 knots (26 km/h)
- Ships in class: 2: Dresden, and Emden
- Service: Commissioned 1908 to 1909, both lost in World War I

==== Königsberg class ====
- Displacement: 3,800 tons
- Armament: 10 x 10.5 cm guns; 8 x 5.2 cm guns; 2 x 45 cm torpedo tubes
- Armor: 50 mm deck
- Performance: Speed 25 knots (46 km/h); Range 4,170 nautical miles (7,720 km) at 12 knots (22 km/h)
- Ships in class: 4: Königsberg, Nürnberg, Stettin, and Stuttgart
- Service: Commissioned 1904 to 1907, two lost in World War I

==== Bremen class ====
- Displacement: 3,700 tons
- Armament: 10 x 10.5 cm guns; 2 x 45 cm torpedo tubes (1916 modification added 2 x 15 cm guns and removed 4 x 10.5 cm guns)
- Armor: 50 mm deck
- Performance: Speed 23 knots (43 km/h); Range 4,690 nautical miles (8,690 km) at 12 knots (22 km/h)
- Ships in class: 7: Bremen, Berlin, Danzig, Hamburg, Leipzig, München, and Lübeck
- Service: Commissioned 1904 to 1907, two lost in World War I, one lost in World War II

==== Gazelle class ====
- Displacement: 2,900 tons
- Armament: 10 x 10.5 cm guns; 14 x machineguns; 3 x 45 cm torpedo tubes; 120 mines
- Armor: 25 mm deck
- Performance: Speed 20 knots (37 km/h); Range 3,570 nautical miles (6,610 km) at 12 knots (22 km/h)
- Ships in class: 10: Gazelle, Niobe, Nymphe, Thetis, Ariadne, Amazone, Medusa, Frauenlob, Arcona, and Undine
- Service: Commissioned 1900 to 1904, three lost in World War I, two lost in World War II

==== SMS Greif ====
- Displacement: 2,266 tons
- Armament: 2 x 10.5 cm guns; 8 x 8.8 cm guns; 10 x 3.7 cm revolving cannon
- Performance: Speed 20 knots (37 km/h); Range 3,500 nautical miles (6,480 km) at 12 knots (22 km/h)
- Ships in class: 1
- Service: Commissioned 1887

==== SMS Hela ====
- Displacement: 2,080 tons
- Armament: 4 x 8.8 cm guns; 6 x 5 cm guns; 3 x 45 cm torpedo tubes
- Performance: Speed 20 knots (37 km/h); Range 3,000 nautical miles (6,000 km) at 12 knots (22 km/h)
- Ships in class: 1
- Service: Commissioned 1896, sunk 1914

==== Bussard class ====
- Displacement: 1,860 tons
- Armament: 8 x 10.5 cm guns; 5 x revolver cannon; 2 x 35 cm torpedo tubes
- Performance: Speed 17 knots (31 km/h); Range 3,040 nautical miles (5,630 km) at 9 knots (17 km/h)
- Ships in class: 3: Seeadler, Geier, and Condor
- Service: Commissioned 1892 to 1893, one lost in World War I

=== Destroyers (Zerstörer) ===
==== Lütjens class (Type 103) ====
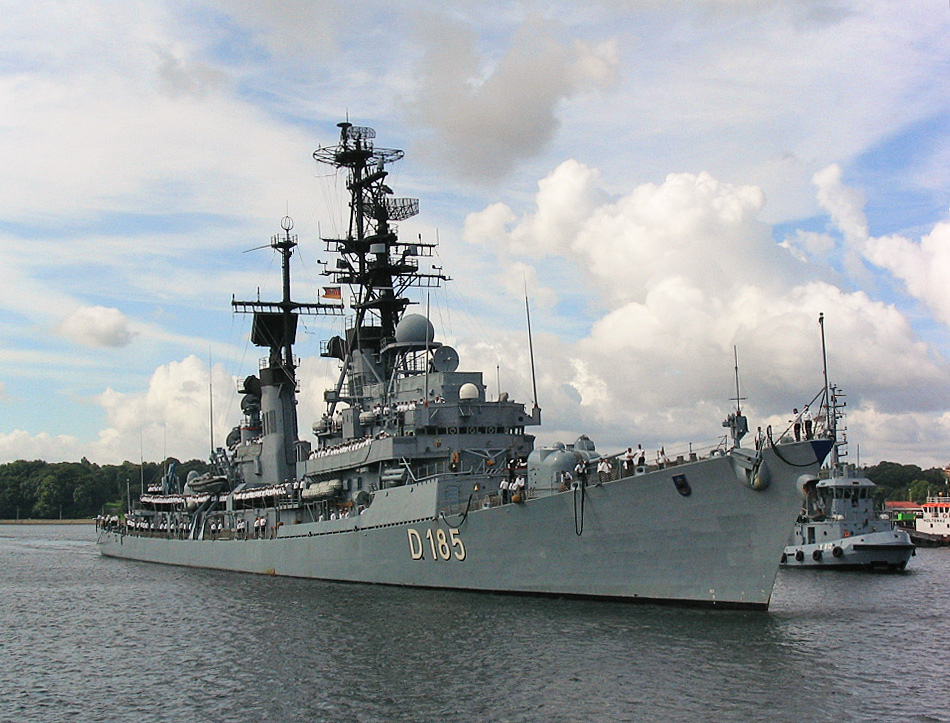
Lütjens (D185)

- Displacement: 4,720 tons
- Armament: 2 x 127 mm guns; 2 x 20 mm autocannon; 1 x Mark 13 launcher with 40 missiles; 2 x Mark 49 launchers with 42 missiles; 6 x 324 mm torpedo tubes; 1 x ASROC launcher with 8 rockets
- Performance: Speed 32 knots (59 km/h)
- Ships in class: 3: Lütjens (D185), Mölders (D186), and Rommel (D187)
- Service: Commissioned from 1969, last decommissioned 2003

==== Hamburg class (Type 101) ====
- Displacement: 4,360 tons
- Armament: 3 x 100 mm DP guns; 4 x twin 40 mm AA guns; 2 x twin MM38 Exocet launchers; 4 x 533 mm torpedo tubes; 2 x quad 375 mm anti submarine rocket launchers; 10 x depth charges; 90 x mines
- Performance: Speed 35 knots (65 km/h); Range 3,400 nautical miles (6,300 km) at 18 knots (33 km/h)
- Ships in class: 4: Hamburg (D181), Schleswig-Holstein (D182), Bayern (D183), and Hessen (D184)
- Service: Commissioned from 1964, last decommissioned 1994, all scrapped

==== Type 1936C ====
- Displacement: 3,680 tons
- Armament: 6 x 12.8 cm DP guns; 6 x 3.7 cm AA guns; 14 x 2 cm AA guns; 6 x 53 cm torpedo tubes; 60 mines; 4 x depth charge launchers
- Performance: Speed 37 knots (69 km/h); Range 2,500 nautical miles (4,630 km) at 19 knots (35 km/h)
- Ships in class: 2
- Service: Neither completed

==== Type 1936A ====
- Displacement: 3,600 tons
- Armament: 4 x 12.7 cm guns; 4 x 3.7 cm AA guns; 5 x 2 cm AA guns; 8 x 53 cm torpedo tubes; 60 mines; 4 x depth charge launchers
- Performance: Speed 37 knots (69 km/h); Range 2,175 nautical miles (4,028 km) at 19 knots (35 km/h)
- Ships in class: 8 (Z23 to Z30)
- Service: Commissioned 1940 to 1941, 4 lost in World War II, last scrapped 1958

==== Type 1936A (Mob) ====
- Displacement: 3,590 tons
- Armament: 4 x 12.7 cm guns; 4 x 3.7 cm AA guns; 12 x 2 cm AA guns; 8 x 53 cm torpedo tubes; 60 mines; 4 x depth charge launchers
- Performance: Speed 37 knots (69 km/h); Range 2,240 nautical miles (4,150 km) at 19 knots (35 km/h)
- Ships in class: 7 (Z31 to Z34 and Z37 to Z39)
- Service: Commissioned 1942 to 1943, 2 lost in World War II, last scrapped 1964

==== Type 1936B ====
- Displacement: 3,540 tons
- Armament: 5 x 12.7 cm guns; 4 x 3.7 cm AA guns; 16 x 2 cm AA guns; 8 x 53 cm torpedo tubes; 76 mines; 4 x depth charge launchers
- Performance: Speed 36 knots (67 km/h); Range 2,600 nautical miles (4,820 km) at 19 knots (35 km/h)
- Ships in class: 5 (Z35, Z36, and Z43 to Z45)
- Service: Three ships commissioned 1943 to 1944, all lost in World War II

==== Type 1936 ====
- Displacement: 3,400 tons
- Armament: 5 x 12.7 cm guns; 4 x 3.7 cm AA guns; 4 x 2 cm AA guns; 8 x 53 cm torpedo tubes; 60 mines; 4 x depth charge launchers
- Performance: Speed 40 knots (74 km/h); Range 2,050 nautical miles (3,800 km) at 19 knots (35 km/h)
- Ships in class: 6 (Z17 to Z22)
- Service: Commissioned 1938 to 1939, 5 lost in World War II, survivor scrapped 1956

==== Type 1934 ====
- Displacement: 3,150 tons
- Armament: 5 x 12.7 cm guns; 4 x 3.7 cm AA guns; 6 x 2 cm AA guns; 8 x 53 cm torpedo tubes; 60 mines
- Performance: Speed 36 knots (67 km/h); Range 1,900 nautical miles (3,520 km) at 19 knots (35 km/h)
- Ships in class: 4 (Z1 to Z4)
- Service: Commissioned 1937, three sunk 1940, survivor scrapped 1947

==== Type 1934A ====
- Displacement: 3,110 tons
- Armament: 5 x 12.7 cm guns; 4 x 3.7 cm AA guns; 6 x 2 cm AA guns; 8 x 53 cm torpedo tubes; 60 mines
- Performance: Speed 36 knots (67 km/h); Range 2,040 nautical miles (3,780 km) at 19 knots (35 km/h)
- Ships in class: 12 (Z5 to Z16)
- Service: Commissioned 1937 to 1939, 7 lost in World War II, last scrapped 1958

==== Type 1942 ====
- Displacement: 2,720 tons
- Armament: 4 x 12.7 cm guns; 8 x 3.7 cm AA guns; 12 x 2 cm AA guns; 6 x 53 cm torpedo tubes; 50 mines
- Performance: Speed 36 knots (67 km/h); Range 5,500 nautical miles (10,190 km) at 19 knots (35 km/h)
- Ships in class: 1 (Z51)
- Service: Launched but never commissioned

==== Flottentorpedoboot ====
- Displacement: 2,587 tons
- Armament: 4 x 12.7 cm gun; 4 x 3.7 cm AA guns; 16 x 2 cm AA guns; 8 x 53 cm torpedo tubes; 50 mines; 4 x depth charge launchers
- Performance: Speed 35 knots (65 km/h); Range 2,350 nautical miles (4,350 km) at 19 knots (35 km/h)
- Ships in class: 3
- Service: None commissioned

==== Type 1916 ====
- Displacement: 2,415 tons
- Armament: 4 x 15 cm gun; 4 x machineguns; 4 x 60 cm torpedo tube; 40 x mines
- Performance: Speed 37 knots (69 km/h); Range 2,500 nautical miles (4,630 km) at 20 knots (37 km/h)
- Ships in class: 12 (S113 to S115, V116 to V118, G119 to G121, and B122 to B124)
- Service: 11 launched, 2 commissioned 1918 to 1919, all scrapped by 1939

==== Fletcher class (Type 119) ====
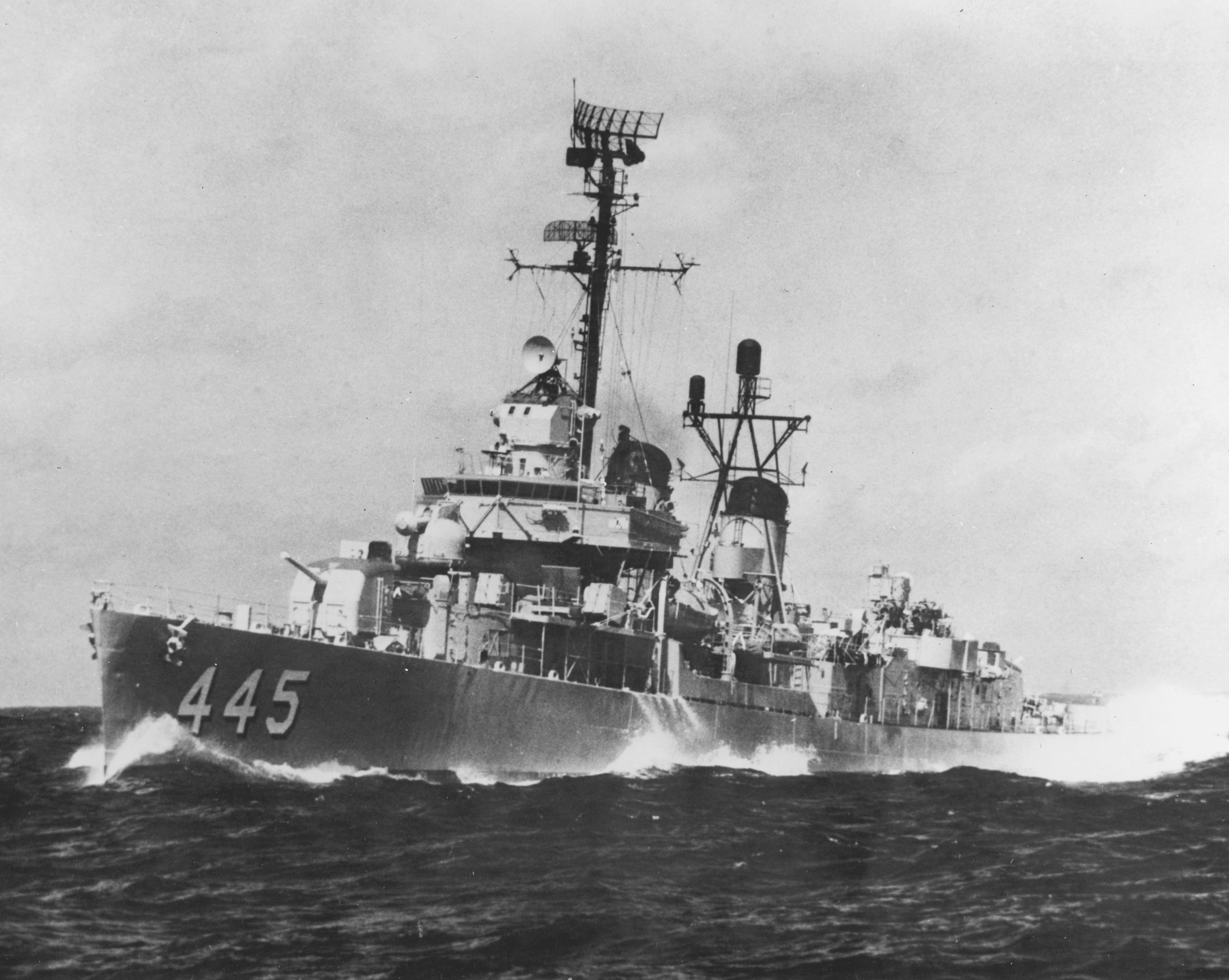
USS Fletcher

- Displacement: 2,050 tons
- Armament: 5 x 5" guns; 10 x 40 mm AA guns; 10 x 20 mm AA guns; 2 x quintuple 21" torpedo tubes; 6 x depth charge launchers; 2 x depth charge racks
- Performance: Speed 36 knots (67 km/h)
- Ships in class: 6
- Service: Ex-USN World War II destroyers, commissioned from 1959, last decommissioned 1981

==== Torpedobootzertörer ====
- Displacement: 1,843 tons
- Armament: 4 x 10.5 cm guns; 4 x 8.8 cm guns; 6 x 45 cm torpedo tubes; 12 mines
- Performance: Speed 37 knots (69 km/h); Range 2,620 nautical miles (4,850 km) at 20 knots (37 km/h)
- Ships in class: 8 (B97, B98, V99, V100, and B109 to B112)
- Service: Commissioned 1915, one lost in World War I, five scuttled at Scapa Flow

== Submarines (Unterseeboot) ==
=== Fleet and attack submarines ===
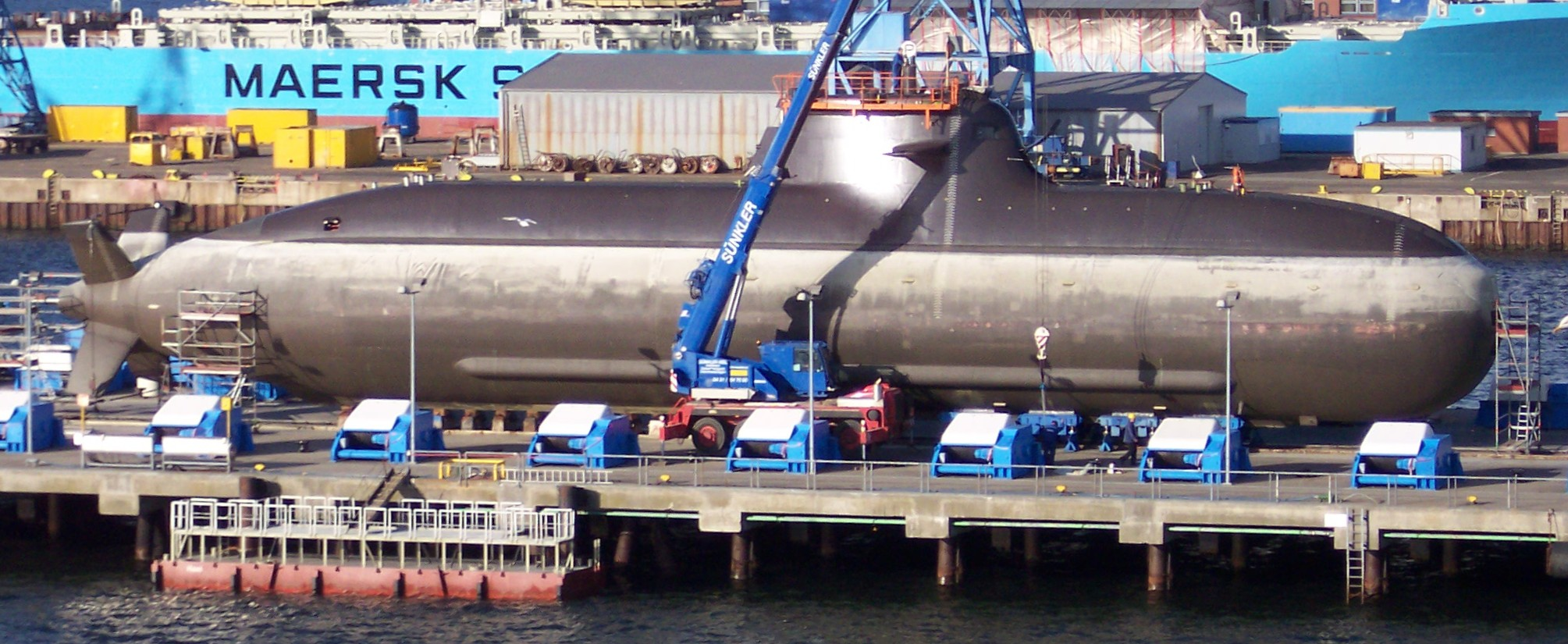
Type 212

==== Type 212 ====
- Displacement: 1,830 tons submerged
- Armament: 6 x 533 mm torpedo tubes with 12 x torpedoes; 24 x mines external; IDAS missiles
- Performance: Speed 20 knots (37 km/h) submerged; Range 420 nautical miles (780 km) at 8 knots (15 km/h) submerged, 8,000 nautical miles (15,000 km) at 8 knots (15 km/h) surfaced; Depth 700 m
- Ships in class: 4 (U-31 to U-34), 2 ordered, 6 more planned
- Commissioned: 4 commissioned

==== Type XXI ====
- Displacement: 1,819 tons submerged
- Armament: 6 x 533 mm torpedo tubes with 23 x torpedoes or 12 x mines
- Performance: Speed 17 knots (31 km/h) submerged; Range 340 nautical miles (630 km) at 5 knots (9 km/h) submerged, 15,500 nautical miles (28,710 km) at 10 knots (19 km/h) surfaced
- Ships in class: 118 (U-2501 to U-2531, U-2533 to U-2536, U-2538 to U-2546, U-2548, U-2551, U-2552, U-3001 to U-3035, U-3037 to U-3041, U-3044, and U-3501 to U-3530)
- Commissioned: 1944
- Fate: Few were ever launched, and all were captured by Allied Forces at the end of the World War II.

==== Type XVIII ====
- Displacement: 1,652 tons submerged
- Armament: 23 x torpedoes
- Performance: Speed 24 knots (44 km/h) submerged; Range 202 nautical miles (374 km) at 24 knots (44 km/h) submerged, 3,000 nautical miles (6,000 km) at 17 knots (31 km/h) surfaced
- Ships in class: 2 (U-796 and U-797)
- Commissioned: None
- Fate: Cancelled while building March 1944

==== Type IXD ====
- Displacement: 1,232 tons submerged
- Armament: 6 x 533 mm torpedo tubes with 24 x torpedoes or 48 x mines
- Performance: Speed 7 knots (13 km/h) submerged; Range 57 nautical miles (106 km) at 4 knots (7 km/h) submerged, 23,700 nautical miles (43,890 km) at 10 knots (19 km/h) surfaced; Depth 230 m
- Ships in class: 30 (U-177 to U-182, U-195 to U-200, U-847 to U-852, U-859 to U-864, and U-871 to U-876
- Commissioned: 1942
- Fate:

==== Type IXC/40 ====
- Displacement: 1,232 tons submerged
- Armament: 6 x 533 mm torpedo tubes with 22 x torpedoes or 44 x mines
- Performance: Speed 7 knots (13 km/h) submerged; Range 63 nautical miles (117 km) at 4 knots (7 km/h) submerged, 13,850 nautical miles (25,650 km) at 10 knots (19 km/h) surfaced; Depth 230 m
- Ships in class: 87 (U-167 to U-170, U-183 to U-194, U-525 to U-550, U-801 to U-806, U-841 to U-846, U-853 to U-858, U-865 to U-870, U-877 to U-881, U-889, and U-1221 to U-1235)
- Commissioned: 1942
- Fate:

==== Type IXC ====
- Displacement: 1,232 tons submerged
- Armament: 6 x 533 mm torpedo tubes with 22 x torpedoes or 44 x mines
- Performance: Speed 7 knots (13 km/h) submerged; Range 63 nautical miles (117 km) at 4 knots (7 km/h) submerged, 13,450 nautical miles (24,910 km) at 10 knots (19 km/h) surfaced; Depth 230 m
- Ships in class: 54 (U-66 to U-68, U-125 to U-131, U-153 to U-166, U-171 to U-176, and U-501 to U-524)
- Commissioned: 1941
- Fate:

==== Type IXB ====
- Displacement: 1,178 tons submerged
- Armament: 6 x 533 mm torpedo tubes with 22 (32) x torpedoes or 44 x mines
- Performance: Speed 8 knots (15 km/h) submerged; Range 78 nautical miles (144 km) at 4 knots (7 km/h) submerged, 10,500 nautical miles (19,450 km) at 10 knots (19 km/h) surfaced; Depth 230 m
- Ships in class: 14 (U-64, U-65, U-103 to U-111, and U-122 to U-124)
- Commissioned: 1939
- Fate:

==== Type IX ====
- Displacement: 1,152 tons submerged
- Armament: 6 x 533 mm torpedo tubes with 22 (32) x torpedoes or 44 x mines
- Performance: Speed 8 knots (15 km/h) submerged; Range 78 nautical miles (144 km) at 4 knots (7 km/h) submerged, 10,500 nautical miles (19,450 km) at 10 knots (19 km/h) surfaced; Depth 230 m
- Ships in class: 8 (U-37 to U-44)
- Commissioned: 1938
- Fate: Six sunk in World War II

==== Type VIIC/42 ====
- Displacement: 1,099 tons submerged
- Armament: 5 x 533 mm torpedo tubes with 16 x torpedoes or 26 x mines
- Performance: Speed 8 knots (15 km/h) submerged; Range 80 nautical miles (150 km) at 4 knots (7 km/h) submerged, 12,600 nautical miles (23,340 km) at 10 knots (19 km/h) surfaced; Depth 270 m
- Ships in class: 164 ordered
- Commissioned: None
- Fate: All contracts cancelled 1943

==== Type IA ====
- Displacement: 983 tons submerged
- Armament: 1 x 10.5 cm deck gun; 6 x 533 mm torpedo tubes with 14 x torpedoes or 28 x mines
- Performance: Speed 8 knots (15 km/h) submerged; Range 78 nautical miles (144 km) at 4 knots (7 km/h) submerged, 7,900 nautical miles (14,630 km) at 10 knots (19 km/h) surfaced; Depth 200 m
- Ships in class: 2 (U-25, U-26)
- Commissioned: 1936
- Fate: Both sunk 1940

==== Type VIIC/41 ====
- Displacement: 871 tons submerged
- Armament: 1 x 8.8 cm deck gun; 5 x 533 mm torpedo tubes with 14 x torpedoes or 26 x mines
- Performance: Speed 8 knots (15 km/h) submerged; Range 80 nautical miles (150 km) at 4 knots (7 km/h) submerged, 8,500 nautical miles (15,740 km) at 10 knots (19 km/h) surfaced; Depth 250 m
- Ships in class: 91
- Commissioned: 1943
- Fate:

==== Type VIIC ====
- Displacement: 871 tons submerged
- Armament: 1 x 8.8 cm deck gun; 5 x 533 mm torpedo tubes with 14 x torpedoes or 26 x mines
- Performance: Speed 8 knots (15 km/h) submerged; Range 80 nautical miles (150 km) at 4 knots (7 km/h) submerged, 8,500 nautical miles (15,740 km) at 10 knots (19 km/h) surfaced; Depth 220 m
- Ships in class: 568
- Commissioned: 1941
- Fate:

==== Type VIIB ====
- Displacement: 857 tons submerged
- Armament: 1 x 8.8 cm deck gun; 5 x 533 mm torpedo tubes with 14 x torpedoes or 26 x mines
- Performance: Speed 8 knots (15 km/h) submerged; Range 90 nautical miles (170 km) at 4 knots (7 km/h) submerged, 8,700 nautical miles (16,110 km) at 10 knots (19 km/h) surfaced; Depth 220 m
- Ships in class: 24 (U-45 to U-55, U-73 to U-76, U-83 to U-87, and U-99 to U-102)
- Commissioned: 1938
- Fate:

==== Type VIIA ====
- Displacement: 745 tons submerged
- Armament: 1 x 8.8 cm deck gun; 5 x 533 mm torpedo tubes with 11 x torpedoes or 22 x mines
- Performance: Speed 8 knots (15 km/h) submerged; Range 94 nautical miles (174 km) at 4 knots (7 km/h) submerged, 6,200 nautical miles (11,480 km) at 10 knots (19 km/h) surfaced; Depth 220 m
- Ships in class: 10 (U-27 to U-36)
- Commissioned: 1936
- Fate: All lost during World War II

=== Coastal submarines ===
==== Type 206A ====
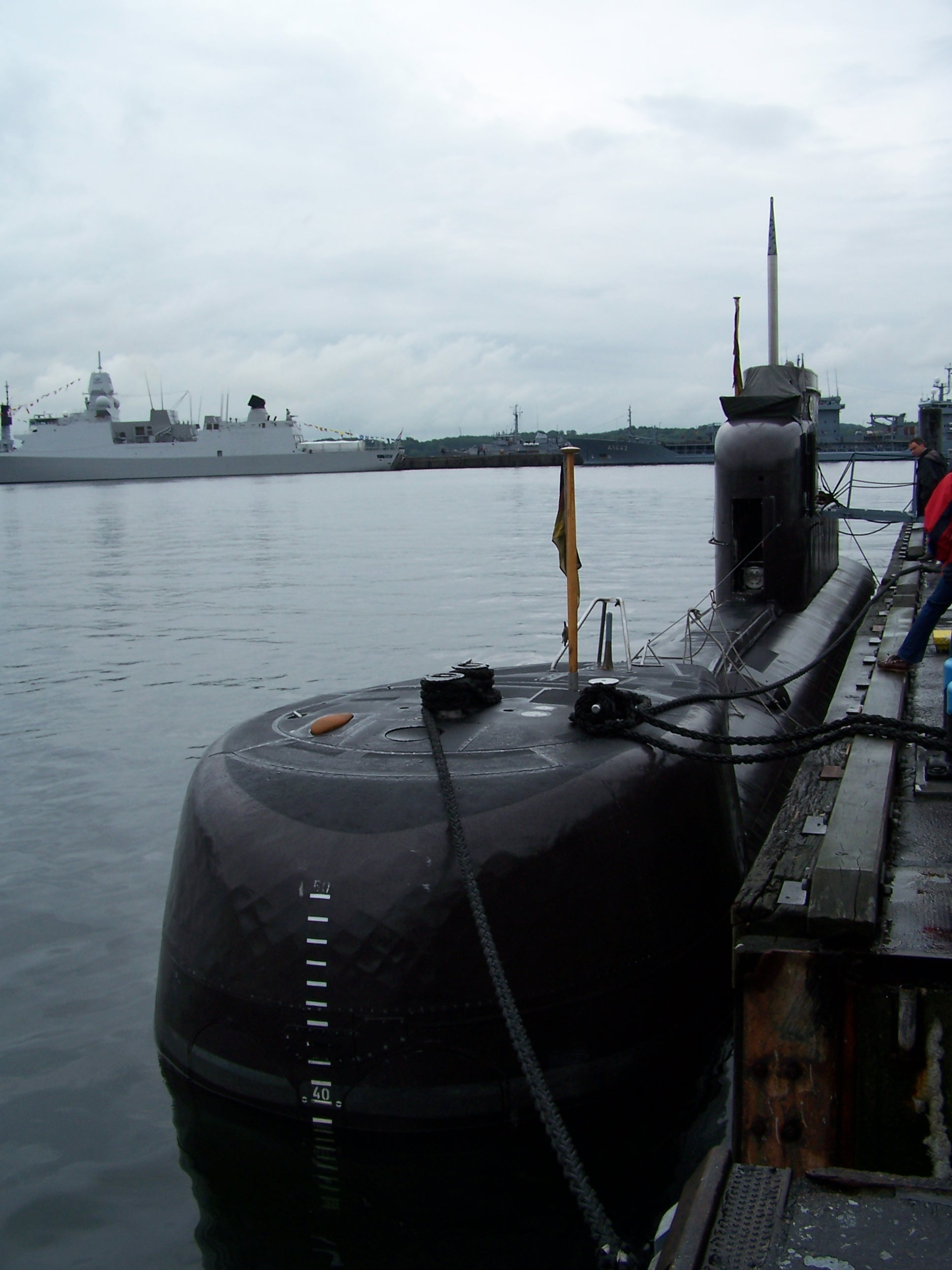
Type 206A at the Kiel Week

- Displacement: 498 tons submerged
- Armament: 8 x 533 mm torpedo tubes with 8 x torpedoes; 24 x mines external
- Performance: Speed 17 knots (31 km/h) submerged; Range 228 nautical miles (422 km) at 4 knots (7 km/h) submerged, 4,500 nautical miles (8,330 km) at 6 knots (11 km/h) surfaced; Depth > 100 m
- Ships in class: 18 (U-13 to U-30)
- Commissioned: 1973-1975
- Fate: 7 remain in active service

==== Type 205 ====
- Displacement: 500 tons submerged
- Armament: 8 x 533 mm torpedo tubes
- Performance: Speed 17 knots (31 km/h) submerged; Range 228 nautical miles (422 km) at 4 knots (7 km/h) submerged, 4,200 nautical miles (7,780 km) at 5 knots (9 km/h) surfaced
- Ships in class: 11 (U-1, U-2, U-4 to U-11)
- Commissioned: 1963
- Fate: Decommissioned 2005

==== Type 201 ====
- Displacement: 450 tons submerged
- Armament: 8 x 533 mm torpedo tubes with 8 x torpedoes or 16 x mines
- Performance: Speed 17 knots (31 km/h) submerged
- Ships in class: 4 (U-1 to U-4)
- Commissioned: 1962
- Fate: Decommissioned by 1967 for rebuilding to Type 205A standard

==== Type IID ====
- Displacement: 364 tons submerged
- Armament: 3 x 533 mm torpedo tubes with 5 x torpedoes or 12 x mines
- Performance: Speed 7 knots (13 km/h) submerged; Range 56 nautical miles (104 km) at 4 knots (7 km/h) submerged, 5,650 nautical miles (10,460 km) at 8 knots (15 km/h) surfaced; Depth 150 m
- Ships in class: 16 (U-137 to U-152)
- Commissioned: 1939

==== Type IIC ====
- Displacement: 341 tons submerged
- Armament: 3 x 533 mm torpedo tubes with 5 x torpedoes or 12 x mines
- Performance: Speed 7 knots (13 km/h) submerged; Range 42 nautical miles (78 km) at 4 knots (7 km/h) submerged, 3,800 nautical miles (7,040 km) at 8 knots (15 km/h) surfaced; Depth 150 m
- Ships in class: 8 (U-56 to U-63)
- Commissioned: 1937

==== Type IIB ====
- Displacement: 328 tons submerged
- Armament: 3 x 533 mm torpedo tubes with 5 x torpedoes or 12 x mines
- Performance: Speed 7 knots (13 km/h) submerged; Range 43 nautical miles (80 km) at 4 knots (7 km/h) submerged, 3,100 nautical miles (5,740 km) at 8 knots (15 km/h) surfaced; Depth 150 m
- Ships in class: 20 (U-7 to U-24, U-120, U-121)
- Commissioned: 1935

==== Type IIA ====
- Displacement: 303 tons submerged
- Armament: 3 x 533 mm torpedo tubes with 5 x torpedoes or 12 x mines
- Performance: Speed 7 knots (13 km/h) submerged; Range 35 nautical miles (65 km) at 4 knots (7 km/h) submerged, 1,600 nautical miles (2,960 km) at 8 knots (15 km/h) surfaced; Depth 150 m
- Ships in class: 6 (U-1 to U-6)
- Commissioned: 1935
- Fate: Three lost in World War II, survivors stricken 1944

==== Type XXIII ====
- Displacement: 258 tons submerged
- Armament: 2 x 533 mm torpedo tubes with 2 x torpedoes
- Performance: Speed 12 knots (22 km/h) submerged; Range 194 nautical miles (359 km) at 4 knots (7 km/h) submerged, 2,600 nautical miles (4,820 km) at 8 knots (15 km/h) surfaced
- Ships in class: 61 (U-2321 to U-2369, U-2371, U-4701 to U-4707, and U-4709 to U-4712)
- Commissioned: 1944
- Fate: 7 lost in World War II

== Special purpose submarines ==
=== Type UC-90 (or UC-III) long-range mine laying submarine ===
- Displacement: 571 tons submerged
- Armament: 3 x 533 mm torpedo tubes; 1 x 3.4 in gun; and 14 x mines
- Performance: Speed 11.5 knots (21.3 km/h) surfaced; 6.6 knots (12.2 km/h) submerged
- Ships in class: UC-97 and ???
- Commissioned: never commissioned
- Fate: launched on 17 March 1918; sunk 7 June 1921 in target practice by the USS Wilmette in Lake Michigan about 20 nautical miles (37 km) east of Highland Park, IL.

=== Type UE-II long-range mine laying submarine ===
- Displacement: 2,177 tons submerged
- Armament: ??? and mines
- Performance:
- Ships in class: U-117 and ???
- Commissioned: 28 March 1918
- Fate: U-117 sunk in 1919 as a target in tests by Billy Mitchell.

=== Type XB mine laying submarine ===
- Displacement: 2,177 tons submerged
- Armament: 2 x 533 mm torpedo tubes with 15 x torpedoes and 66 x SMA mines
- Performance: Speed 7 knots (13 km/h) submerged; Range 93 nautical miles (172 km) at 4 knots (7 km/h) submerged, 18,450 nautical miles (34,170 km) at 10 knots (19 km/h) surfaced; Depth 220 m
- Ships in class: 8 (U-116 to U-119, U-219, U-220, U-233, and U-234)
- Commissioned: 1941
- Fate: Six lost in World War II

=== Type XIV supply submarine ===
- Displacement: 1,932 tons submerged
- Armament: 3 x AA guns
- Performance: Speed 6 knots (11 km/h) submerged; Range 55 nautical miles (102 km) at 4 knots (7 km/h) submerged, 12,350 nautical miles (22,870 km) at 10 knots (19 km/h) surfaced; Depth 240 m
- Ships in class: 10 (U-459 to U-464 and U-487 to U-490)
- Commissioned: 1941
- Fate:

=== Type VIIF torpedo supply submarine ===
- Displacement: 1,181 tons submerged
- Armament: 5 x 533 mm torpedo tubes with 14 x torpedoes
- Performance: Speed 8 knots (15 km/h) submerged; Range 75 nautical miles (139 km) at 4 knots (7 km/h) submerged, 14,700 nautical miles (27,220 km) at 10 knots (19 km/h) surfaced; Depth 200 m
- Ships in class: 4 (U-1059 to U-1062)
- Commissioned: 1943
- Fate:

=== Type VIID mine laying submarine ===
- Displacement: 1,080 tons submerged
- Armament: 5 x 533 mm torpedo tubes with 14 x torpedoes or 26 x mines and 15 x SMA mines
- Performance: Speed 8 knots (15 km/h) submerged; Range 69 nautical miles (128 km) at 4 knots (7 km/h) submerged, 11,200 nautical miles (20,740 km) at 10 knots (19 km/h) surfaced; Depth 200 m
- Ships in class: 6 (U-213 to U-218)
- Commissioned: 1941
- Fate: Five lost in World War II

=== Type XVIIB research submarine ===
- Displacement: 337 tons submerged
- Armament: None
- Performance: Speed 25 knots (46 km/h) submerged; Range 123 nautical miles (228 km) at 25 knots (46 km/h) submerged, 3,000 nautical miles (6,000 km) at 8 knots (15 km/h) surfaced
- Ships in class: 12 (U-1405 to U-1416)
- Commissioned: Three from 1944
- Fate: Three scuttled May 1945, nine cancelled while building

=== Hans Techel class (Type 202) ===
- Displacement: 137 tons submerged
- Armament: 2 x short torpedo tubes with 2 x torpedoes or 4 x mines
- Performance: Speed 13 knots (24 km/h) submerged
- Ships in class: 2: Hans Techel (S172) and Friedrich Schürer (S173)
- Service: Commissioned from 1965, both decommissioned 1966 and scrapped

=== Type XVIIA research submarine ===
- Displacement: 309 tons submerged
- Armament: None
- Performance: Speed 25 knots (46 km/h) submerged; Range 127 nautical miles (235 km) at 20 knots (37 km/h) submerged, 2,910 nautical miles (5,390 km) at 8 knots (15 km/h) surfaced
- Ships in class: 4 (U-792 to U-795)
- Commissioned: 1943
- Fate: All scuttled May 1944

== Midget submarines ==
=== Type XXVIIB5 Seehund ===
- Displacement: 17 tons submerged
- Armament: 2 x torpedoes
- Performance: Range 300 m at 7 knots (13 km/h); Depth 50 m
- Ships in class: 285
- Commissioned: 1944
- Fate: 35 lost during World War II

=== Type XXVII Hecht ===
- Displacement:
- Armament: 1 x torpedo or 1 x limpet mine
- Performance: Range 40 nautical miles (70 km) at 6 knots (11 km/h) submerged or 78 nautical miles (144 km) at 3 knots (6 km/h) surfaced
- Ships in class: 53
- Commissioned: 1944
- Fate:

=== Molch ===
- Displacement: 11 tons
- Armament: 2 x torpedoes
- Performance: Range 40 nautical miles (70 km) at 5 knots (9 km/h) submerged
- Ships in class: 393
- Commissioned: 1944
- Fate:

=== Biber ===
- Displacement: 6.5 tons
- Armament: 2 x torpedoes
- Performance: Range 9 nautical miles (17 km) at 5 knots (9 km/h) submerged or 130 nautical miles (240 km) at 6 knots (11 km/h) surfaced
- Ships in class: 324
- Commissioned: 1944
- Fate:

== Surface combatants ==
=== Frigates (Fregatten) ===
==== Baden-Württemberg class (Type 125) ====
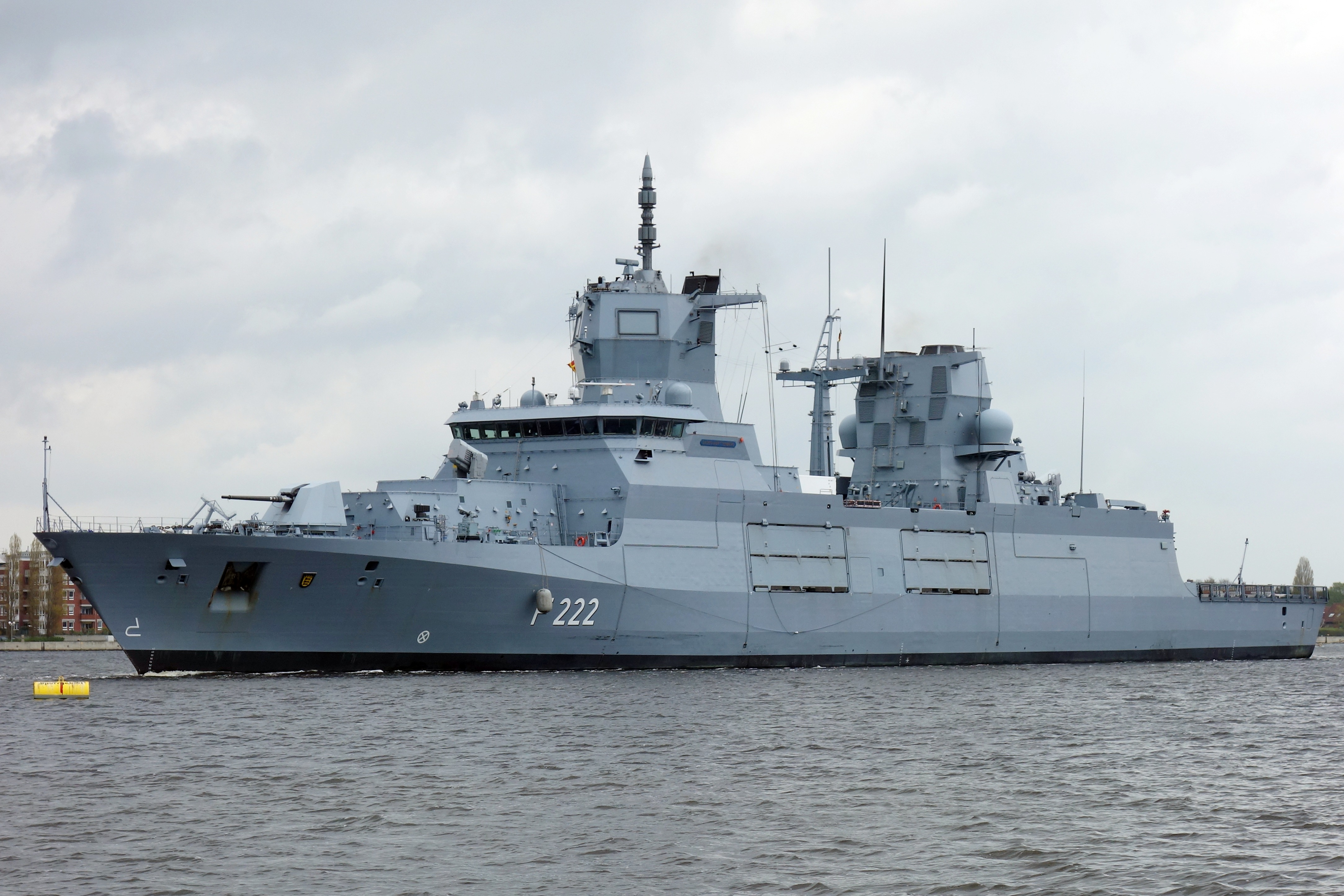
Baden-Württemberg (F222)

- Displacement: 7,200 tons
- Armament: 8 x anti-ship/land-attack missiles; 42 x RAM missiles; 1 x 127 mm gun; 2 x MLG 27 autocannon; 5 x 12.7 mm remote machineguns; 2 12.7 mm machineguns, water cannons
- Aircraft: Landing deck with hangar for two helicopters
- Performance: Speed 27 knots (50 km/h); Range 4,000 nautical miles (7,000 km) at 18 knots (33 km/h)
- Ships in class: 4: Baden-Württemberg (F222), Nordrhein-Westfalen (F223), Sachsen-Anhalt (F224), and Rheinland-Pfalz (F225)
- Service: Under development

==== Sachsen class (Type 124) ====
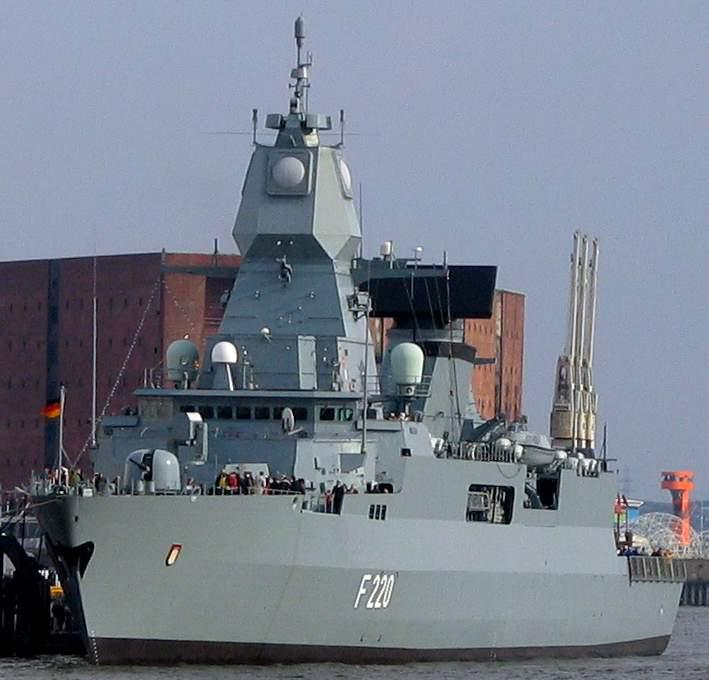
Hamburg (F220)

- Displacement: 5,690 tons
- Armament: 1 x VLS with 56 missiles; 42 x RAM missiles; 8 x Harpoon missiles; 1 x 76 mm DP gun; 2 x 27 mm autocannon; 2 x triple torpedo launchers
- Aircraft: Landing deck with hangar for two Sea Lynx or MH90 helicopters
- Performance: Speed 29 knots (54 km/h); Range 4,000 nautical miles (7,000 km) at 18 knots (33 km/h)
- Ships in class: 3: Sachsen (F219), Hamburg (F220), Hessen (F221)
- Service: Commissioned from 2004, all currently in service

==== Brandenburg class (Type 123) ====
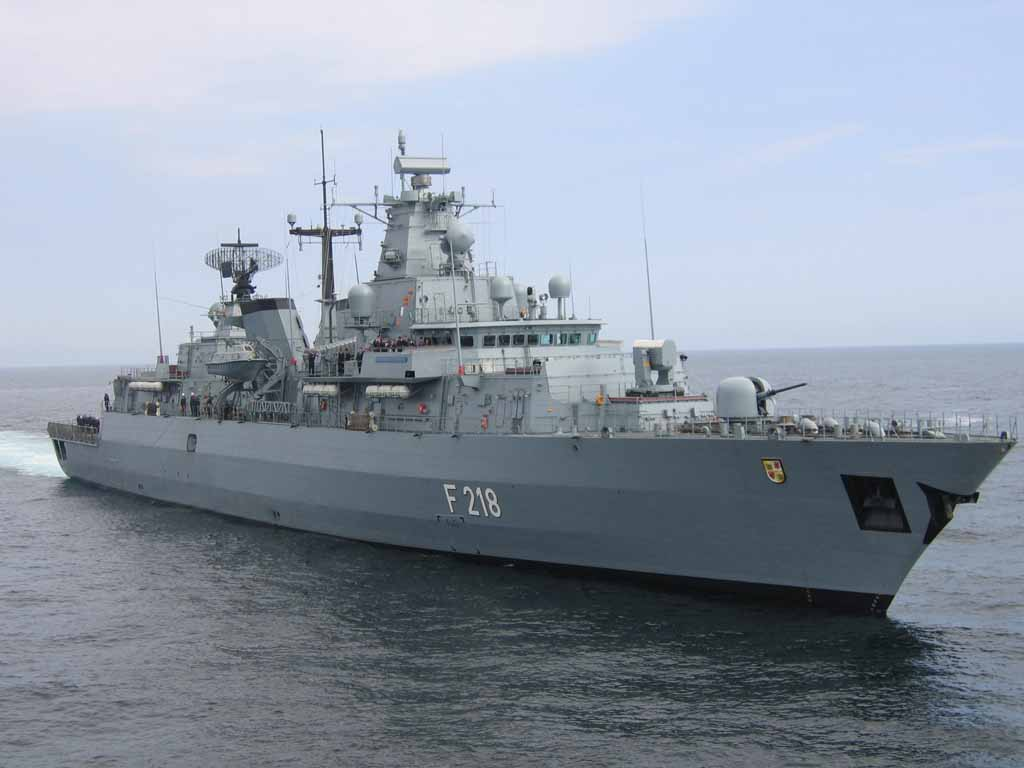
Mecklenburg-Vorpommern (F218)

- Displacement: 4,900 tons
- Armament: 1 x Mark 41 VLS with 16 missiles; 2 x Mark 49 launcher with 42 missiles; 4 x Exocet missiles; 1 x 76 mm DP gun; 2 x 27 mm autocannon; 4 x 324 mm torpedo tubes
- Aircraft: Landing deck with hangar for Sea Lynx helicopters
- Performance: Speed 29 knots (54 km/h); Range 4,000 nautical miles (7,000 km) at 18 knots (33 km/h)
- Ships in class: 4: Brandenburg (F215), Schleswig-Holstein (F216), Bayern (F217), and Mecklenburg-Vorpommern (F218)
- Service: Commissioned from 1994, all currently in service

==== Bremen class (Type 122) ====
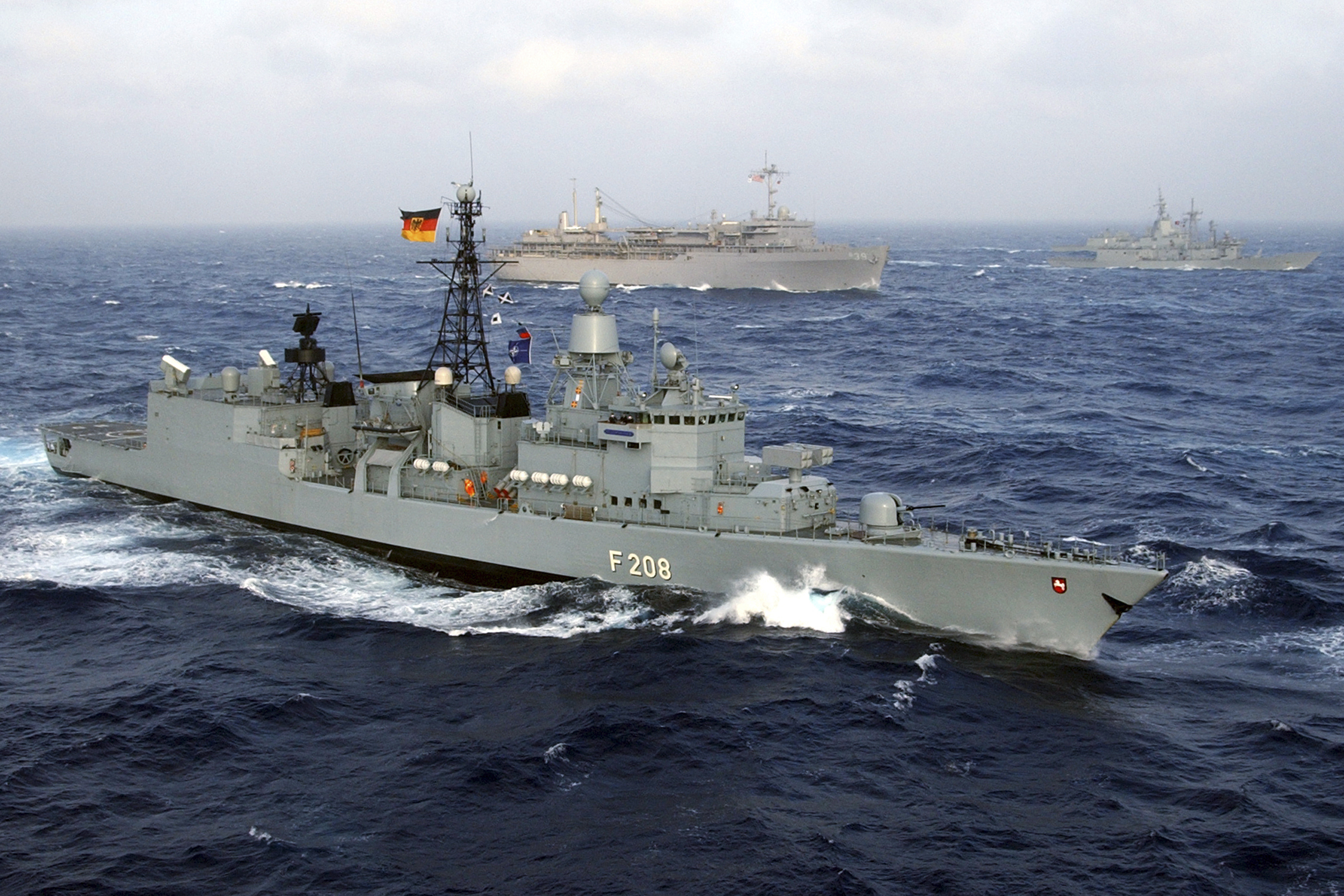
Niedersachsen (F208)

- Displacement: 3,680 tons
- Armament: 1 x 76 mm guns; rocket launchers; 1 8 cell launch system, 16 Sea Sparrow surface to air missiles; 2 quadruple Harpoon anti-ship missile launchers; 2 MK 49 launcher, 21 RAM each; 2 MLG 27 mm autocannons; 2 Mark 32 324 mm twin torpedo launchers with 8 Mark 46 torpedoes
- Aircraft: Landing deck with hangar for Sea Lynx helicopters
- Performance: Speed 30 knots (56 km/h); Range more than 4,000 nautical miles (7,000 km) at 18 knots (33 km/h)
- Ships in class: 8: Bremen (F207), Niedersachsen (F208), Rheinland-Pfalz (F209), Emden (F210), Köln (F211), Karlsruhe (F212), Augsburg (F213), and Lübeck (F214)
- Service: Commissioned from 1982, all currently in service

==== Köln class (Type 120) ====
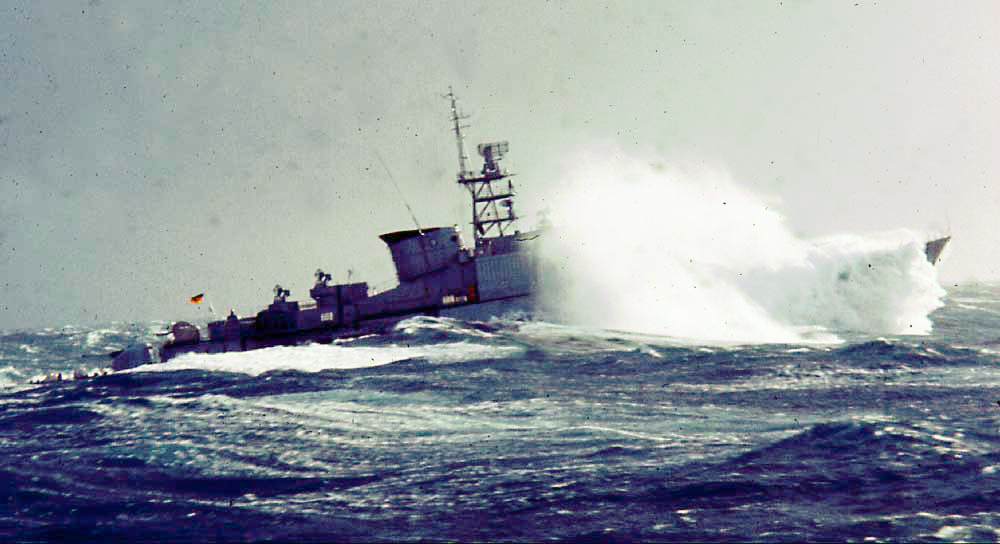
Lübeck (D224)

- Displacement: 2,969 tons
- Armament: 2 x 100 mm guns; 2 x twin 40 mm AA guns; 2 x 40 mm guns; 4 x 533 mm torpedo tubes; 2 x quad 375 mm anti-submarine rocket launchers; depth charges; mines
- Performance: Speed 34 knots (63 km/h); Range 2,700 nautical miles (5,000 km) at 22 knots (41 km/h)
- Ships in class: 6: Köln (F220), Emden (F221), Augsburg (F222), Karlsruhe (F223), Lübeck (F224), and Braunschweig (F225)
- Service: Commissioned from 1961, last decommissioned 1989

=== Corvettes (Korvette) ===
==== Braunschweig class (Type 130) ====
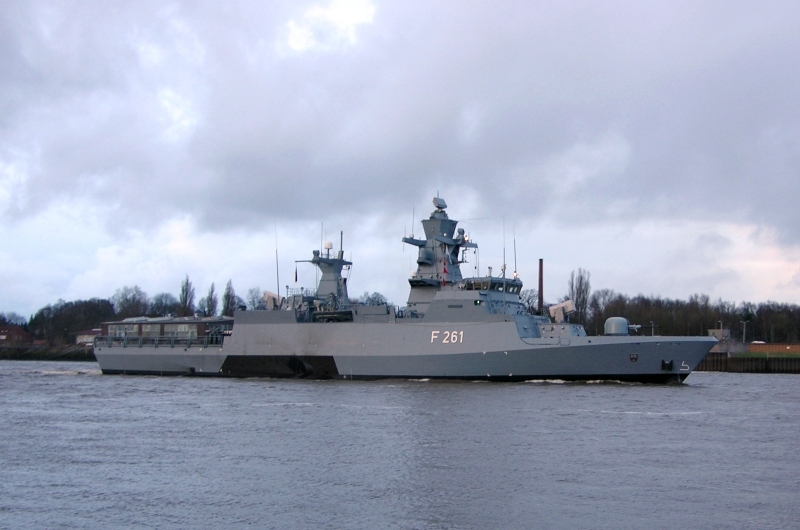
Magdeburg (F261)

- Displacement: 1,840 tons
- Armament: 1 x 76 mm gun; 2 x 27 mm autocannon; 42 x RAM missiles; 4 x RBS-15 missiles; mines
- Aircraft: Landing deck with hangar for unmanned aerial vehicles
- Performance: Speed 26 knots (48 km/h); Range 4,000 nautical miles (7,410 km) at 15 knots (28 km/h)
- Ships in class: 5: Braunschweig (F260), Magdeburg (F261), Erfurt (F262), Oldenburg (F263), and Ludwigshafen (F264)
- Service: Five ships in service, at least five more planned

==== Flottenbegleiter ====
- Displacement: 1,030 tons
- Armament: 2 x 10.5 cm guns; 2 x 8.8 cm guns; 4 x 3.7 cm AA guns; 2 x 2 cm AA guns; 4 x depth charge launchers
- Performance: Speed 28 knots (52 km/h); Range 1,965 nautical miles (3,639 km) at 13 knots (24 km/h)
- Ships in class: 10
- Service: Commissioned 1936 to 1938, four lost in World War II, many converted to other roles

=== Torpedo boats (Torpedoboot) ===
==== Type 1916 (Mob) ====
- Displacement: 1,560 tons
- Armament: 4 x 10.5 cm gun; 4 x machineguns; 6 x 50 cm torpedo tubes; 40 mines
- Performance: Speed 35 knots (65 km/h); Range 2,000 nautical miles (4,000 km) at 20 knots (37 km/h)
- Ships in class: 33 (V170 to V177, S178 to S185, and H186 to H202)
- Service: 4 commissioned 1919 to 1921

==== Type 24 ====
- Displacement: 1,320 tons
- Armament: 3 x 10.5 cm guns; 2 x 2 cm AA guns; 6 x 53 cm torpedo tubes; 30 mines
- Performance: Speed 35 knots (65 km/h); Range 2,000 nautical miles (4,000 km) at 17 knots (31 km/h)
- Ships in class: 6
- Service: Commissioned 1928 to 1929, all lost in World War II

==== Type 1916 (Mob) ====
- Displacement: 1,290 tons
- Armament: 3 x 10.5 cm gun; 6 x 50 cm torpedo tubes; 40 mines
- Performance: Speed 34 knots (63 km/h); Range 1,960 nautical miles (3,630 km) at 20 knots (37 km/h)
- Ships in class: 46 (G96, V125 to V130, S131 to S139, V140 to V144, H145 to H147, G148 to G150, I51, S152 to S157, V158 to V165, H166 to H169)
- Service: 36 launched, 20 commissioned 1916 to 1918, one lost in World War I, nine scuttled at Scapa Flow

==== Type 23 ====
- Displacement: 1,250 tons
- Armament: 3 x 10.5 cm guns; 2 x 2 cm AA guns; 6 x 53 cm torpedo tubes; 30 mines
- Performance: Speed 33 knots (61 km/h); Range 1,800 nautical miles (3,330 km) at 17 knots (31 km/h)
- Ships in class: 6
- Service: Commissioned 1926 to 1927, all lost in World War II

==== Type 37 ====
- Displacement: 1,100 tons
- Armament: 1 x 10.5 cm gun; 12 x 2 cm AA guns; 6 x 53 cm torpedo tubes; 30 mines
- Performance: Speed 35 knots (65 km/h); Range 1,070 nautical miles (1,980 km) at 19 knots (35 km/h)
- Ships in class: 9 (T12 to T21)
- Service: Commissioned 1941 to 1942, four lost in World War II, all but one scrapped by 1952

==== Type 35 ====
- Displacement: 1,100 tons
- Armament: 1 x 10.5 cm gun; 12 x 2 cm AA guns; 6 x 53 cm torpedo tubes; 30 mines
- Performance: Speed 35 knots (65 km/h); Range 1,070 nautical miles (1,980 km) at 19 knots (35 km/h)
- Ships in class: 12 (T1 to T12)
- Service: Commissioned 1939 to 1940, seven lost in World War II, all but one scrapped by 1952

==== Type 1913 ====
- Displacement: 1,100 tons
- Armament: 3 x 8.8 cm gun; 6 x 50 cm torpedo tubes; 24 mines
- Performance: Speed 36 knots (67 km/h); Range 1,800 nautical miles (3,330 km) at 20 knots (37 km/h)
- Ships in class: 71 (V25 to V30, S31 to S36, G37, G38, G39, G40, G41, G42, V43, V44, V45, V46, V47, V48, S49 to S66, V67 to V84, and G85 to G95)
- Service: Commissioned 1914 to 1917

==== Type 1906 ====
- Displacement: 800 tons
- Armament: 3 x 10.5 cm guns; 3 x 8.8 cm gun; 3 x 45 cm torpedo tubes
- Performance: Speed 34 knots (63 km/h); Range 1,250 nautical miles (2,320 km) at 17 knots (31 km/h)
- Ships in class: 59 (S138 to S149, V150 to V164, S165 to S168, G169 to G175, S176 to S179, V180 to V191, and G192 to G197)
- Service: Commissioned 1907 to 1911

==== Type 1911 ====
- Displacement: 750 tons
- Armament: 2 x 8.8 cm gun; 4 x 45 cm torpedo tubes
- Performance: Speed 34 knots (63 km/h); Range 1,150 nautical miles (2,130 km) at 17 knots (31 km/h)
- Ships in class: 24 (V1 to V6, G7 to G12, and S13 to S24)
- Service: Commissioned 1912 to 1913

==== Type 1898 ====
- Displacement: 600 tons
- Armament: 1 x 8.8 cm gun; 4 x 5.2 cm guns; 2 x 5 cm guns; 3 x 45 cm torpedo tubes
- Performance: Speed 32 knots (59 km/h); Range 1,500 nautical miles (2,780 km) at 17 knots (31 km/h)
- Ships in class: 49 (S90 to S133 and G134 to G137)
- Service: Commissioned 1899 to 1907, 12 lost in World War I, last scrapped in 1921

==== Type 1916 ====
- Displacement: 390 tons
- Armament: 3 x 8.8 cm gun; 1 x 45 cm torpedo tube; depth charges
- Performance: Speed 28 knots (52 km/h); Range 800 nautical miles (1,480 km) at 20 knots (37 km/h)
- Ships in class: 68 (A56 to A113)
- Service: 40 launched, 36 commissioned 1917 to 1918, 9 lost in World War II, most scrapped by 1923

==== Type 1915 ====
- Displacement: 250 tons
- Armament: 3 x 8.8 cm gun; 1 x 45 cm torpedo tube; depth charges
- Performance: Speed 26 knots (48 km/h); Range 690 nautical miles (1,280 km) at 20 knots (37 km/h)
- Ships in class: 30 (A26 to A55)
- Service: Commissioned 1916 to 1917

==== Type 1897 ====
- Displacement: 175 tons
- Armament: 3 x 5 cm gun; 3 x 45 cm torpedo tubes
- Performance: Speed 26 knots (48 km/h); Range 1,600 nautical miles (2,960 km) at 12 knots (22 km/h)
- Ships in class: 8 (S82 to S89)
- Service: Commissioned 1897 to 1898, all scrapped in 1921

==== Type 1892 ====
- Displacement: 175 tons
- Armament: 1 x 5 cm gun; 3 x 45 cm torpedo tubes
- Performance: Speed 23 knots (43 km/h); Range 1,700 nautical miles (3,150 km) at 12 knots (22 km/h)
- Ships in class: 16 (S66 to S81)
- Service: Commissioned 1892 to 1896, four lost in World War I, last scrapped in 1921

==== Type 1885 ====
- Displacement: 150 tons
- Armament: 1 x 5 cm gun; 2 x 3.7 cm revolver cannon; 3 x 45 cm torpedo tubes
- Performance: Speed 22 knots (41 km/h); Range 2,250 nautical miles (4,170 km) at 10 knots (19 km/h)
- Ships in class: 59 (S7 to S65)
- Service: Commissioned 1885 to 1892, 15 lost in World War I, last scrapped 1921

==== Type 1914 ====
- Displacement: 148 tons
- Armament: 1 x 5 cm gun; 2 x 45 cm torpedo tubes; 4 mines
- Performance: Speed 20 knots (37 km/h); Range 440 nautical miles (810 km) at 19 knots (35 km/h)
- Ships in class: 25 (A1 to A25)
- Service: Commissioned 1915

=== Fast attack craft (Schnellboot) ===
==== Albatros class (Type 143) ====
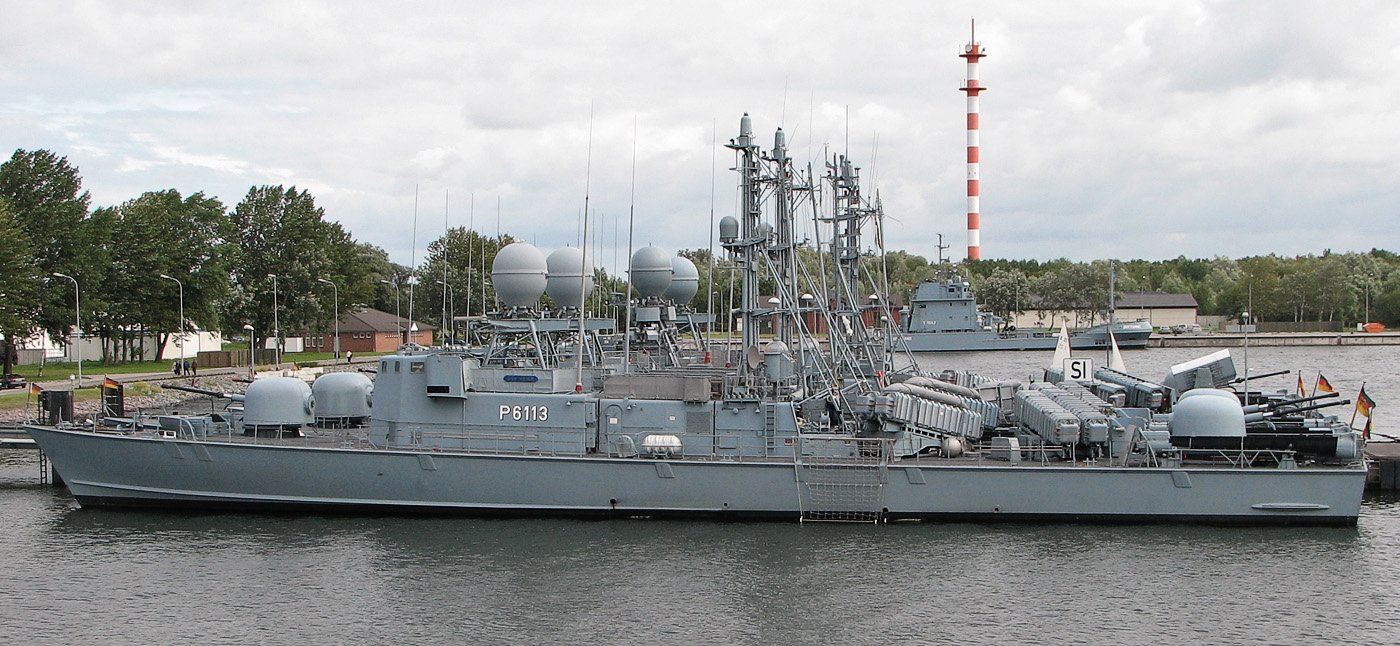
S63 Geier and others

- Displacement: 398 tons
- Armament: 2 x 76 mm guns; 4 x Exocet missiles; 2 x torpedo tubes
- Performance: Speed 40 knots (74 km/h)
- Ships in class: 10 (S61 to S70)
- Service: Commissioned from 1976, last decommissioned 2005

==== Gepard class (Type 143A) ====
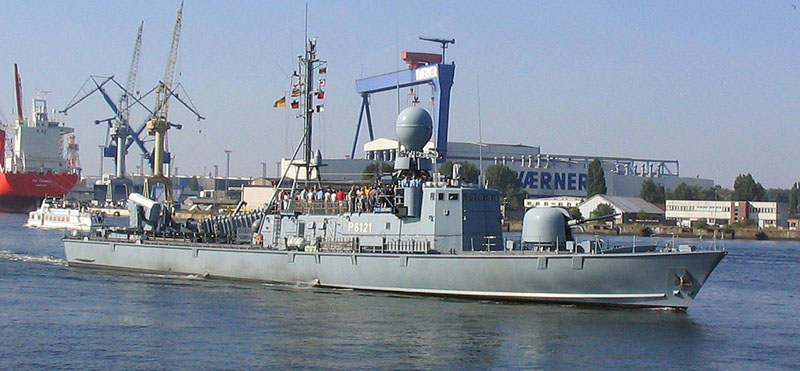
S71 Gepard

- Displacement: 391 tons
- Armament: 1 x 76 mm gun; 4 x Exocet missiles; 21 RAM missiles; 2 x MG50 machine guns; mines
- Performance: Speed 40 knots (74 km/h)
- Ships in class: 10 (S71 to S80)
- Service: Commissioned from 1982, currently in service

==== Tiger class (Type 148) ====
- Displacement: 265 tons
- Armament: 1 x 76 mm gun; 4 x Exocet missiles; 1 x 40 mm gun; 8 x mines
- Performance: Speed 36 knots (67 km/h)
- Ships in class: 20 (S41 to S60)
- Service: Commissioned from 1972, last decommissioned 2002

==== Zobel class (Type 142) ====
- Displacement: 205 tons
- Armament: 2 x 40 mm guns; 4 x 533 mm torpedo tubes
- Performance: Speed 42 knots (78 km/h)
- Ships in class: 10 (S31 to S40)
- Service: Commissioned from 1961, last decommissioned 1984

==== Seeadler class (Type 141) ====
- Displacement: 190 tons
- Armament: 2 x 40 mm guns; 4 x 533 mm torpedo tubes; 4 x depth charges
- Performance: Speed 43 knots (80 km/h)
- Ships in class: 10 (S6 to S11 and S25 to S28)
- Service: Commissioned from 1958, last decommissioned 1976

==== Jaguar class (Type 140) ====
- Displacement: 183 tons
- Armament: 2 x 40 mm guns; 4 x 533 mm torpedo tubes; 4 x depth charges (optionally may ship 2 x minelaying ramps instead of two tubes)
- Performance: Speed 42 knots (78 km/h); Range 700 nautical miles (1,300 km)
- Ships in class: 20 (S1 to S5, S12 to S24, S29, and S30)
- Service: Commissioned from 1957, last decommissioned 1975

==== Type 1939/40 ====
- Displacement: 110 tons
- Armament: 6 x 3 cm AA gun; 2 x 2 cm AA gun; 2 x 53 cm torpedo tubes; 8 mines
- Performance: Speed 41 knots (76 km/h)
- Ships in class: 220 (S26 to S29, S38 to S53, S62 to S150; S159 to S232; S301 to S328; S701 to S709)
- Service: Commissioned 1941 to 1945, many scrapped before completion

==== Type 1939 ====
- Displacement: 102 tons
- Armament: 1 x 2 cm gun; 8 x machineguns; 2 x 53 cm torpedo tubes; 6 mines
- Performance: Speed 36 knots (67 km/h); Range 800 nautical miles (1,480 km) at 30 knots (56 km/h)
- Ships in class: 16 (S30 to S37, S54 to S61)
- Service: Commissioned 1939 to 1941, twelve lost in World War II

==== Type 1937 ====
- Displacement: 105 tons
- Armament: 1 x 2 cm gun; 1 x machinegun; 2 x 53 cm torpedo tubes
- Performance: Speed 40 knots (74 km/h); Range 700 nautical miles (1,300 km) at 35 knots (65 km/h)
- Ships in class: 8 (S18 to S25)
- Service: Commissioned 1938 to 1939, one lost in World War II

==== Type 1934 ====
- Displacement: 105 tons
- Armament: 1 x 2 cm gun; 1 x machinegun; 2 x 53 cm torpedo tubes
- Performance: Speed 37 knots (69 km/h); Range 500 nautical miles (930 km) at 32 knots (59 km/h)
- Ships in class: 4 (S14 to S17)
- Service: Commissioned 1936 to 1938, two lost in World War II, others turned over to Allies

==== Type 1933 ====
- Displacement: 90 tons
- Armament: 1 x 2 cm gun; 4 x machineguns; 2 x 53 cm torpedo tubes
- Performance: Speed 36 knots (67 km/h); Range 600 nautical miles (1,110 km) at 30 knots (56 km/h)
- Ships in class: 7 (S7 to S13)
- Service: Commissioned 1934 to 1935, one scuttled in World War II, remainder turned over to Allies

==== Nasty class (Type 152) ====
- Displacement: 398 tons
- Armament: 2 x 76 mm guns; 4 x Exocet missiles; 2 x torpedo tubes
- Performance: Speed 40 knots (74 km/h)
- Ships in class: 2: Hugin and Munin
- Service: Commissioned from 1960, both decommissioned 1964

==== Type 1931 ====
- Displacement: 57 tons
- Armament: 1 x 2 cm gun; 2 x 53 cm torpedo tubes
- Performance: Speed 33 knots (61 km/h); Range 580 nautical miles (1,070 km) at 22 knots (41 km/h)
- Ships in class: 4 (S2 to S5)
- Service: Commissioned 1932, all to Spain in 1936

==== Leichte Schnellboote ====
- Displacement: 12 tons
- Armament: 2 x 2 cm guns; 1 x machinegun; 2 x 45 cm torpedo tubes; 4 mines
- Performance: Speed 40 knots (74 km/h); Range 300 nautical miles (560 km) at 30 knots (56 km/h)
- Ships in class: 12
- Service: Commissioned 1940 to 1944, all but one lost during World War II

== Mine warfare vessels ==
=== Minehunters (Minensuchboot) ===
==== Sperrbrecher ====
- Displacement: 7,500 tons (typical)
- Armament: 2 x 10.5 cm guns; 2 x 3.7 cm AA gun; 15 x 2 cm AA guns (typical)
- Performance: Speed 14 knots (typical)
- Ships in class: Around 100
- Service: Converted from merchant ships through World War II, about 50 lost, many returned to merchant duties after the war

==== Type 1935 ====
- Displacement: 870 tons
- Armament: 2 x 10.5 cm guns; 1 x 3.7 cm AA gun; 6 x 2 cm AA guns; 4 x depth charge launchers; 30 mines
- Performance: Speed 18 knots (33 km/h); Range 5,000 nautical miles (9,000 km) at 10 knots (19 km/h)
- Ships in class: 69
- Service: Commissioned 1938 to 1943, 34 lost during World War II, five served with German Federal Navy

==== Type 1943 ====
- Displacement: 821 tons
- Armament: 2 x 10.5 cm guns; 2 x 3.7 cm AA gun; 8 x 2 cm AA guns; 4 x depth charge launchers; 24 mines
- Performance: Speed 17 knots (31 km/h); Range 3,600 nautical miles (6,670 km) at 11 knots (20 km/h)
- Ships in class: 17
- Service: Commissioned 1944 to 1945, one lost during World War II

==== Type 1941 ====
- Displacement: 775 tons
- Armament: 2 x 10.5 cm guns; 4 x 3.7 cm AA gun; 10 x 2 cm AA guns; 4 x depth charge launchers
- Performance: Speed 17 knots (31 km/h); Range 4,000 nautical miles (7,000 km) at 10 knots (19 km/h)
- Ships in class: 131
- Service: Commissioned 1941 to 1944, 63 lost during World War II, five served with German Federal Navy

==== Ensdorf class (Type 352) ====
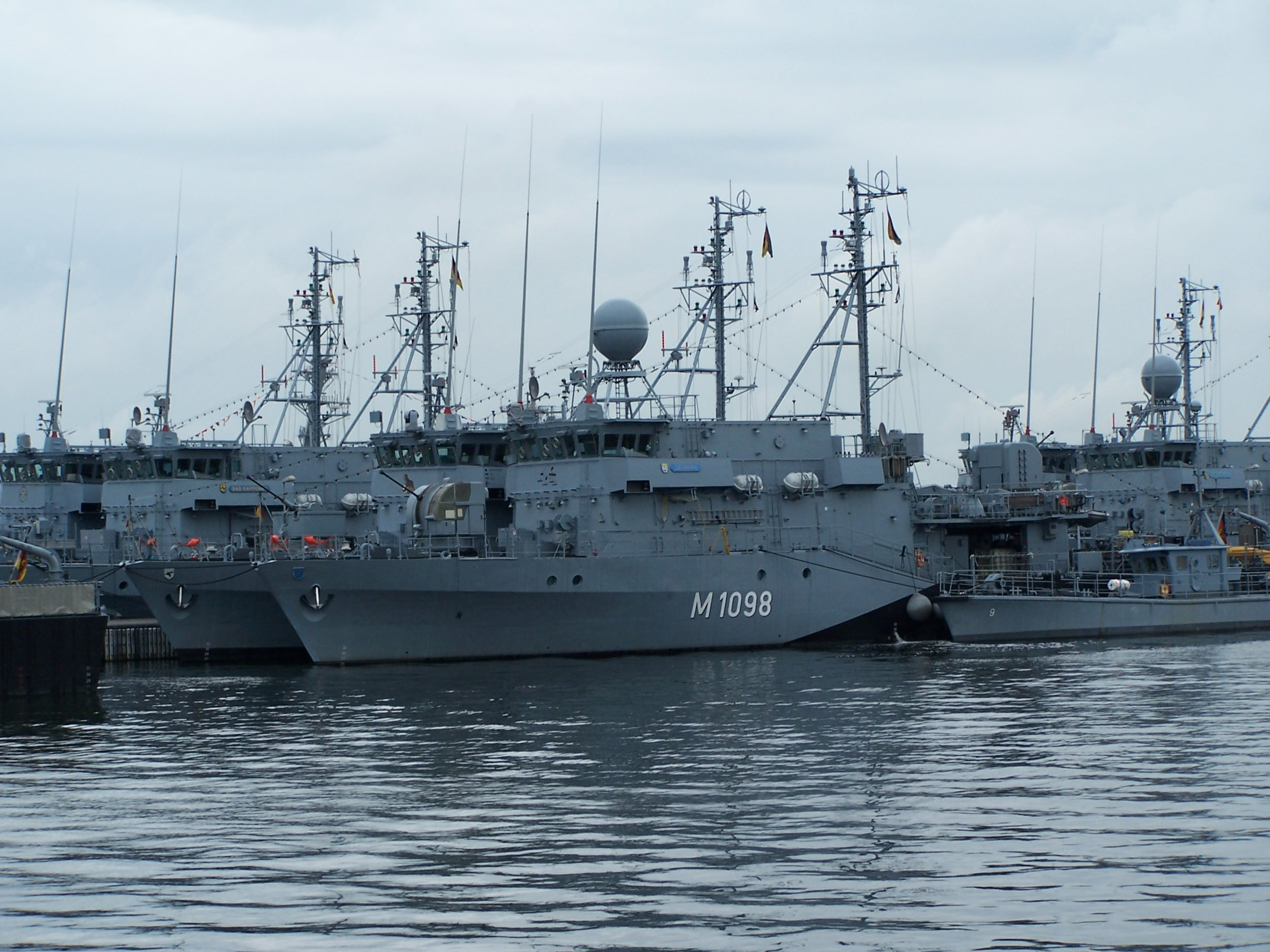
Siegburg (M1098), an Ensdorf-class minesweeper

- Displacement: 650 tons
- Armament:
- Bofors 40 mm/L70 dual-purpose gun (to be upgraded to 2 Mauser MLG27 27 mm remote-controlled guns)
- Fliegerfaust 2 surface-to-air missiles (MANPADS)
- Mine-laying capabilities (60 mines)
- Performance: Speed 18 knots (33 km/h)
- Ships in class: 5: Ensdorf (M1094), Auerbach/Oberpfalz (M1093), Hameln (M1092), Pegnitz (M1090) and Siegburg (M1098)
- Service: Commissioned from 1990, all in active service

==== Frankenthal class (Type 332) ====
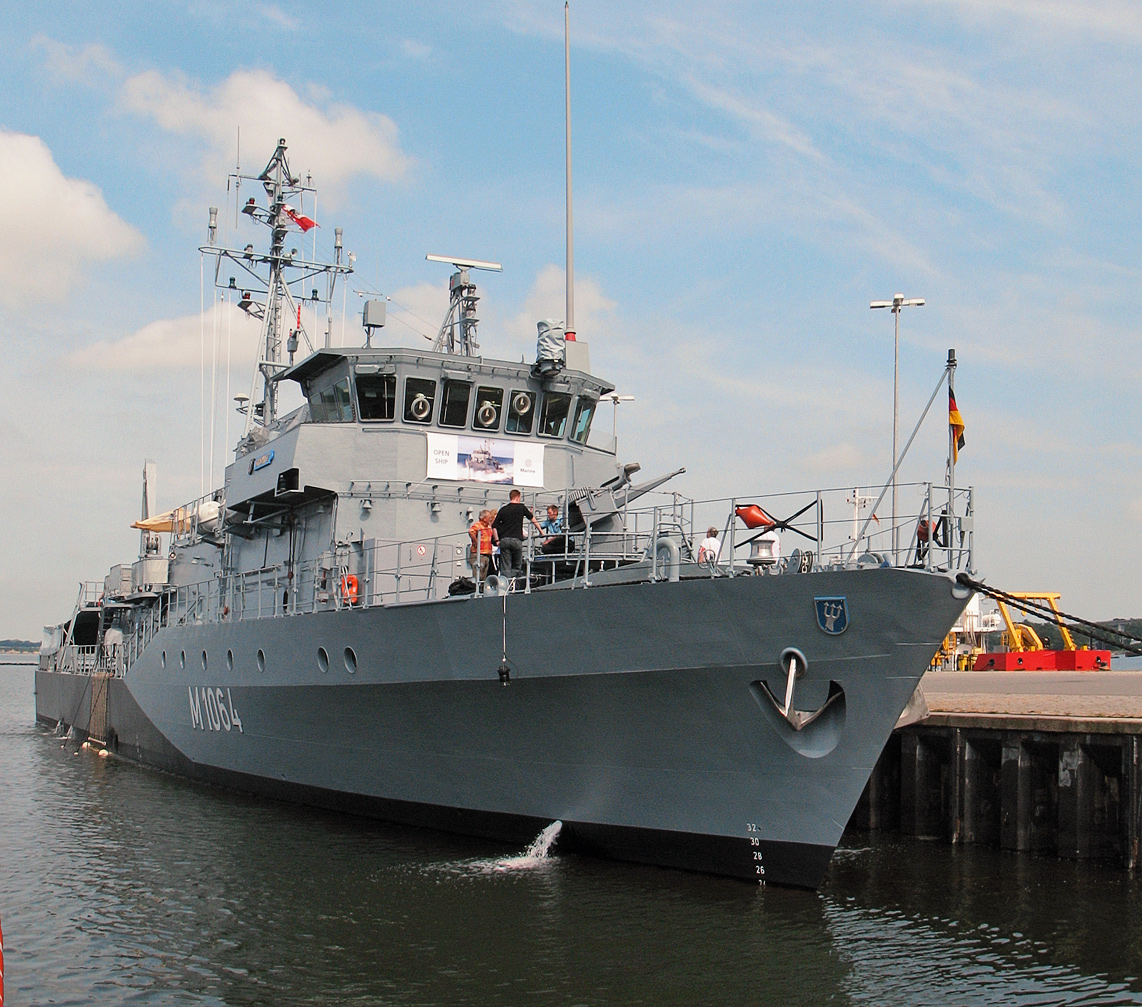
Grömitz (M1064), already equipped with the MLG 27

- Displacement: 660 tons
- Armament: 1 x 40 mm DP gun; mines (currently upgrading to 1 x MLG 27 mm autocannon)
- Performance: Speed 18 knots (33 km/h)
- Ships in class: 12: Frankenthal (M1066), Weiden (M1060), Rottweil (M1061), Bad Bevensen (M1063), Bad Rappenau (M1067), Grömitz (M1064), Datteln (M1068), Dillingen (M1065), Homburg (M1069), Sulzbach-Rosenberg (M1062), Fulda (M1058), and Weilheim (M1059)
- Service: Commissioned from 1992, all in active service

==== Kulmbach class (Type 333) ====
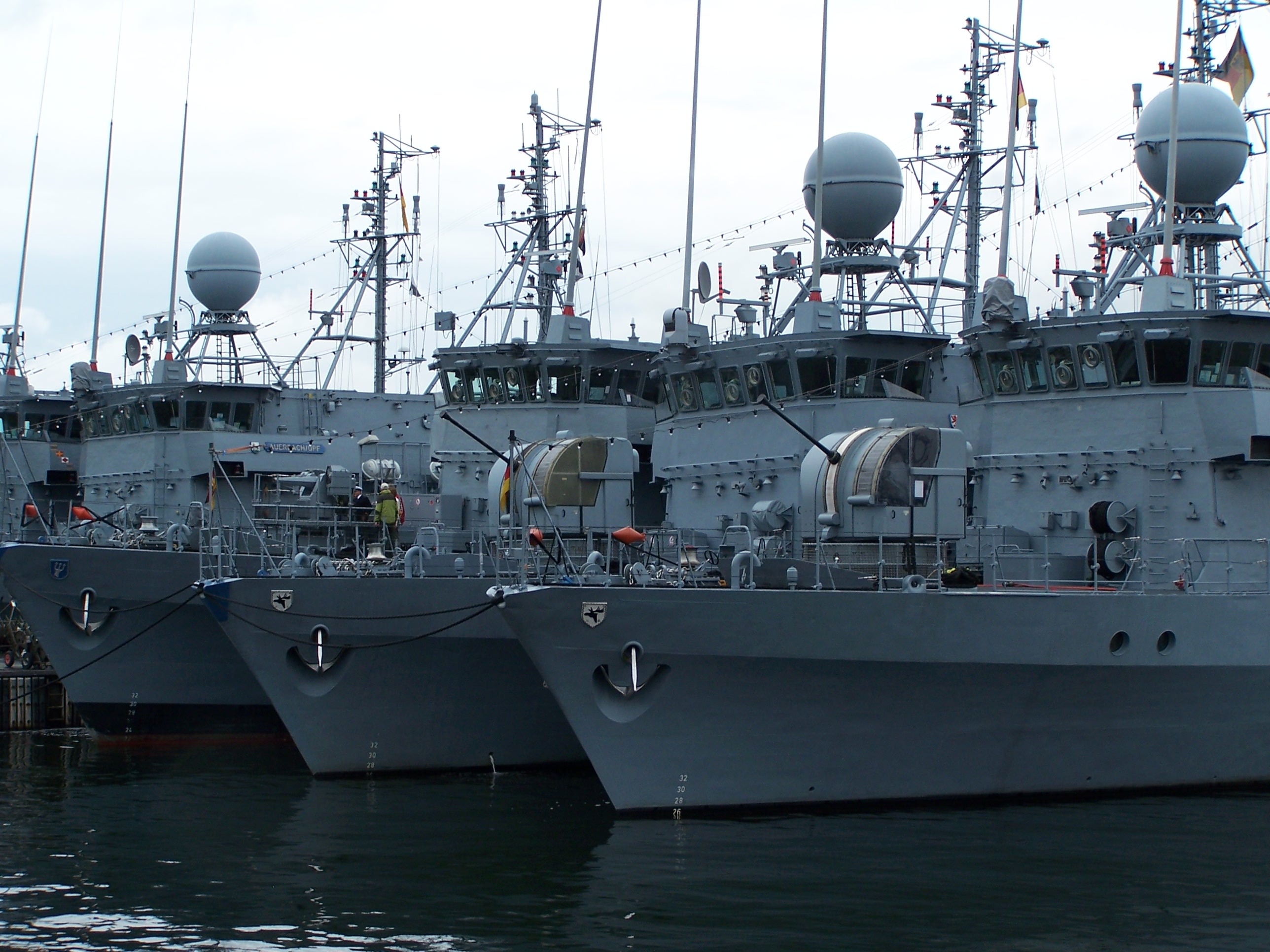
Kulmbach-class minehunters

- Displacement: 645 tons
- Armament: 2 x 40 mm DP guns (currently upgrading to 1 x MLG 27 mm autocannon); 2 x anti-aircraft missile launchers; mines
- Performance: Speed 18 knots (33 km/h)
- Ships in class: 5: Kulmbach (M1091), Überherrn (M1095), Herten (M1099), Passau (M1096), and Laboe (M1097)
- Service: Commissioned from 1989, all in active service

==== Seehund ROV (part of the TROIKA Plus system of the Ensdorf-class minesweepers) ====
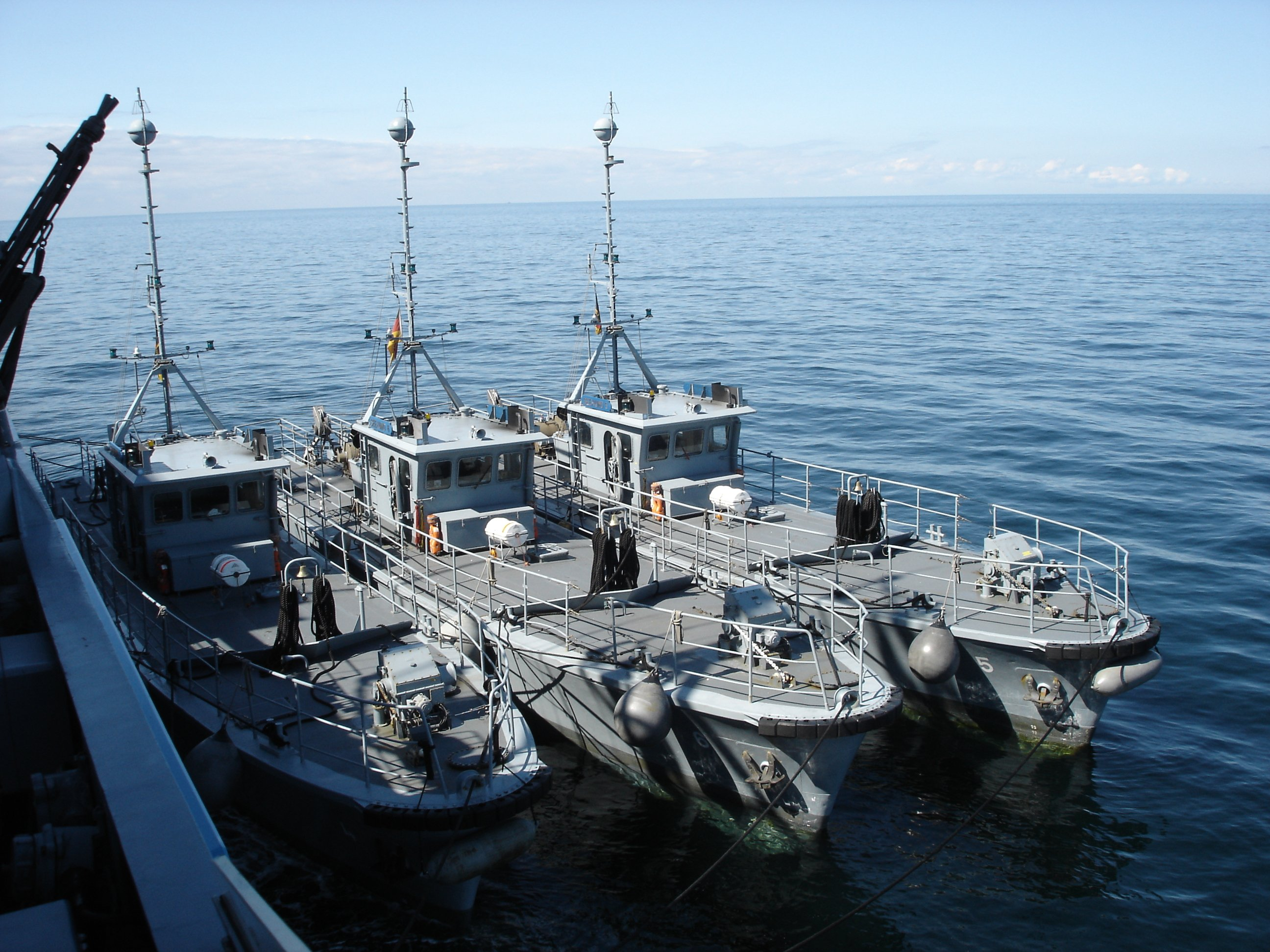
Three Seehund ROVs

- Length: 25 m
- Displacement: 97.8t
- Propulsion: Schottel Z-drive
- Max speed: 9-10kts
- Ships in class: 18: all in active service

Seehund can be controlled remotely or manually by an onboard crew (usually 3) for maneuvering in harbours or in training (the Seehund is too large to be carried by Ensdorf-class vessels). A life raft is carried for this reason.

==== Type 1916 ====
- Displacement: 630 tons
- Armament: 2 x 8.8 cm guns; 30 x mines
- Performance: Speed 16 knots (30 km/h); Range 2,000 nautical miles (4,000 km) at 14 knots (26 km/h)
- Ships in class: 120 (M57 to M176)
- Service: 91 launched, 81 commissioned 1918 to 1920, 8 lost in World War I

==== Type 1915 ====
- Displacement: 510 tons
- Armament: 2 x 10.5 cm guns; 30 x mines (some boats shipped 3 x 8.8 cm guns instead of 2 x 10.5 cm guns)
- Performance: Speed 16 knots (30 km/h); Range 2,000 nautical miles (4,000 km) at 14 knots (26 km/h)
- Ships in class: 30 (M27 to M56)
- Service: Commissioned 1916, 10 lost in World War I

==== Type 1914 ====
- Displacement: 475 tons
- Armament: 2 x 8.8 cm guns; 1 x 3.7 cm revolver cannon; 30 x mines
- Performance: Speed 17 knots (31 km/h); Range 1,680 nautical miles (3,110 km) at 14 knots (26 km/h)
- Ships in class: 26 (M1 to M26)
- Service: Commissioned 1914 to 1917, 11 lost in World War I

==== Flachgehende Minensuchboote ====
- Displacement: 205 tons
- Armament: 1 x 8.8 cm gun
- Performance: Speed 14 knots (26 km/h); Range 650 nautical miles (1,200 km) at 14 knots (26 km/h)
- Ships in class: 66 (FM1 to FM66)
- Service: 54 launched, commissioned 1918 to 1919, 6 lost in World War II

==== Minenräumboot ====
- Displacement: 155 tons
- Armament: 1 x 3.7 cm AA gun; 3 x 2 cm AA guns; 1 x 8.6 cm Föhn launcher
- Performance: Speed 19 knots (35 km/h)
- Ships in class: 300
- Service: About 160 lost during World War II

=== Mine layers (Minenleger) ===
==== Albatross ====
- Displacement: 2,500 tons
- Armament: 8 x 8.8 cm guns; 288 x mines
- Performance: Speed 20 knots (37 km/h); Range 3,680 nautical miles (6,820 km) at 9 knots (17 km/h)
- Ships in class: 1
- Service: Commissioned 1908, scrapped 1921

==== Auxiliary mine layer (Hilfsminenleger) ====
- Displacement: 300 to 4,200 tons
- Ships in class: 16 conversions
- Service: Converted from various merchant and passenger ships, commissioned as mine layers in 1914, all survived World War I, most returned to civil duties

==== Küstenminenleger ====
- Displacement: 19 tons
- Armament: 2 x 2 cm guns; 4 mines
- Performance: Speed 32 knots (59 km/h); Range 225 nautical miles (417 km) at 25 knots (46 km/h)
- Ships in class: 36 (KM1 to KM36)
- Service: Commissioned 1941 to 1943

== Amphibious warfare vessels ==
=== Landing craft (Landungsboote) ===
==== Barbe class (Type 520) ====
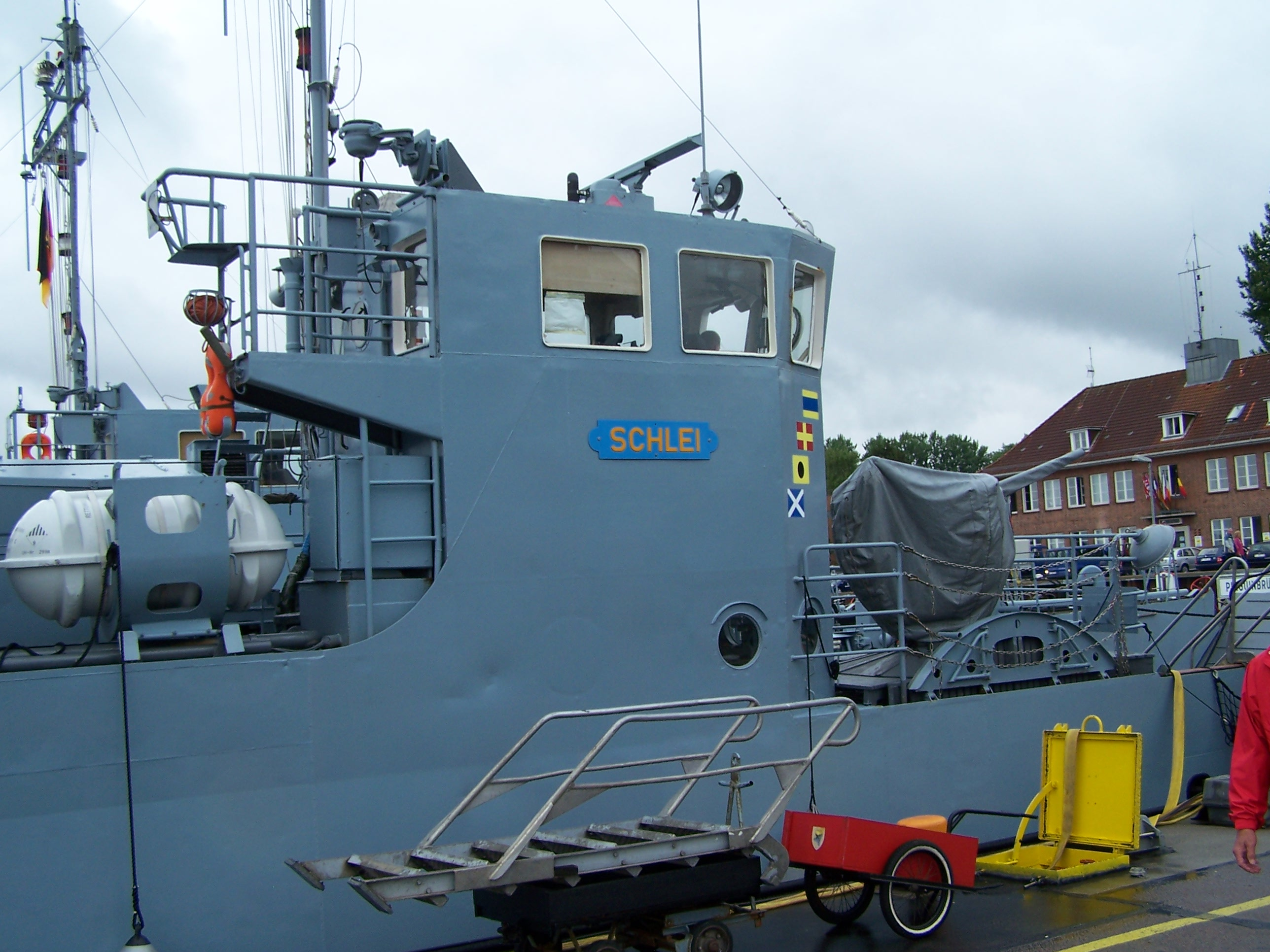
Barbe-class landing craft

- Displacement: 430 tons
- Armament: 2 x 20 mm autocannon; mines
- Capacity: 150 t
- Performance: Speed 11 knots (20 km/h)
- Ships in class: 22
- Service: Commissioned from 1965, two remain in active service

==== Type 554 ====
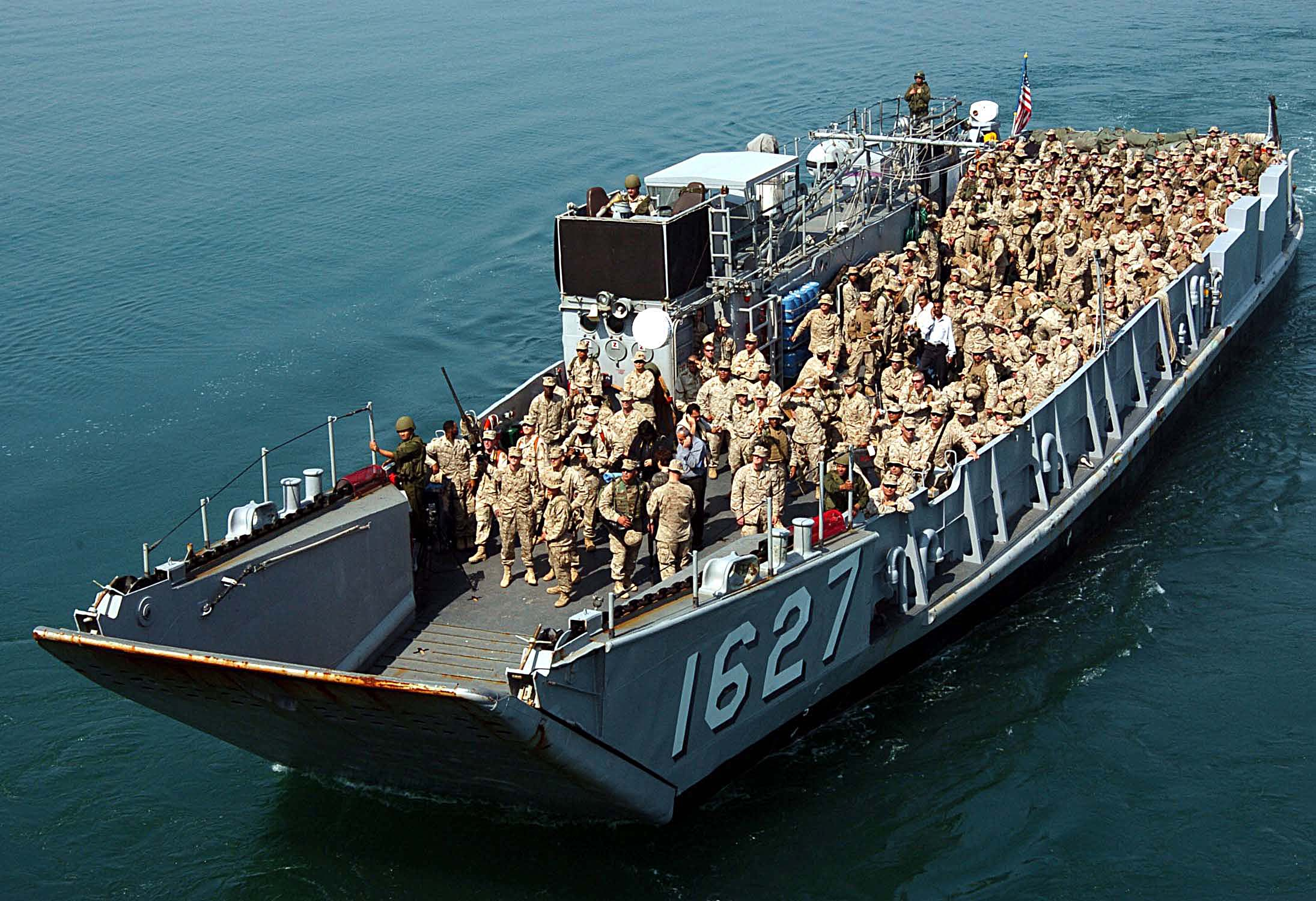
Typical LCU

- Displacement: 375 tons
- Armament: 2 x 12.7 mm machineguns
- Capacity: 125 t or 400 troops
- Performance: Speed 11 knots (20 km/h); Range 1,200 nautical miles (2,220 km) at 9 knots (17 km/h)
- Ships in class: 1
- Service: 1958 to 1964

==== Type 521 ====
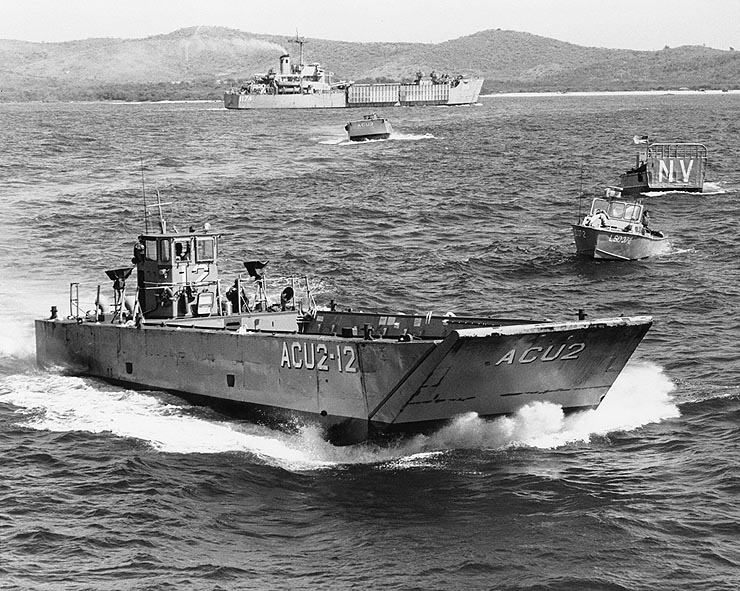
Typical LCM-8

- Displacement: 111 tons
- Armament: Small arms
- Capacity: 53 t
- Performance: Speed 11 knots (20 km/h)
- Ships in class: 28
- Service: Commissioned from 1965, decommissioned

==== Type 552 ====
- Displacement: 13 tons
- Capacity: 0.4 t or 36 troops
- Performance: Speed 10 knots (19 km/h); Range 80 nautical miles (148 km)
- Ships in class: 9
- Service: 1958 to 1964

== Auxiliary ships ==
=== Tenders and replenishment ships ===
==== Berlin class (Type 702) ====
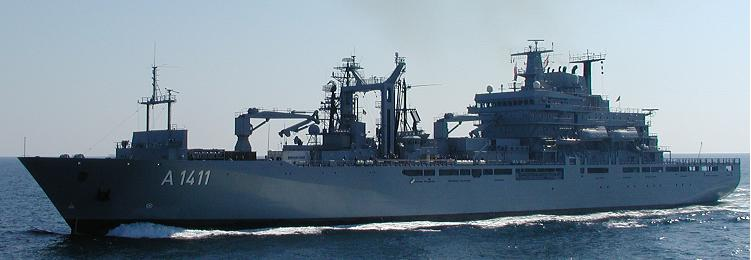
Berlin (A1411)

- Displacement: 20,240 tons
- Armament: 4 x 27 mm autocannon; Fliegerfaust 2 missiles
- Aircraft: Helicopter deck with hangar for two large helicopters
- Ships in class: 2: Berlin (A1411) and Frankfurt am Main (A1412)
- Service: Commissioned from 2001, both in active service, 2 more planned (Bonn (A1413) and 1 other)

==== Rhön class (Type 704A) ====
- Displacement: 14,170 tons
- Capacity: 44,760 m^{3}
- Performance: Speed 16 knots (30 km/h)
- Ships in class: 2: Rhön (A1443) and Spessart (A1442)
- Service: Commissioned from 1966, two remain in active service

==== Elbe class (Type 404) ====
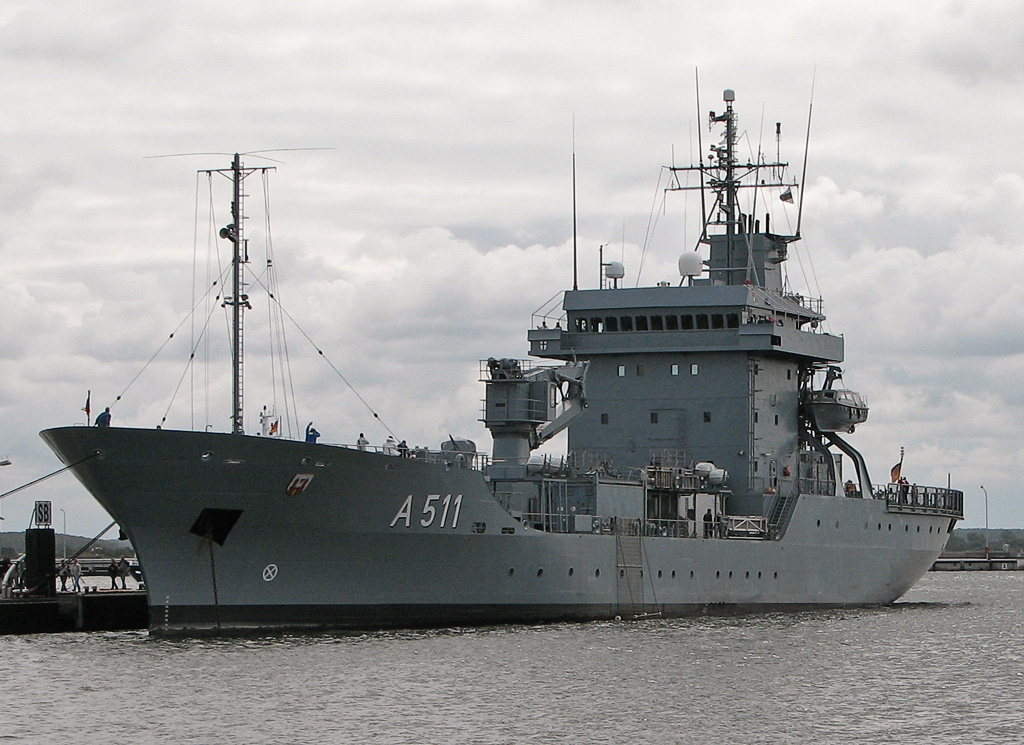
Elbe (A511)

- Displacement: 3,586 tons
- Armament: 2 x Fliegerfaust missiles; 2 x 20 mm autocannon
- Aircraft: Helicopter deck, no hangar
- Capacity: 700 m^{3} fuel; 60 m^{3} aviation fuel; 280 m^{3} fresh water; 160t ammunition; 40t supplies
- Performance: Speed 15 knots (28 km/h); Range 2,600 nautical miles (4,820 km)
- Ships in class: 12: Elbe (A511), Mosel (A512), Rhein (A513), Werra (A514), Main (A515), and Donau (A516)
- Service: Commissioned from 1993, all in active service

==== Walchensee class (Type 703) ====
- Displacement: 2,190 tons
- Capacity: 1,100t fuel; 60t fresh water
- Performance: Speed 12 knots (22 km/h)
- Ships in class: 4: Walchensee (A1424), Ammersee (A1425), Tegernsee (A1426), and Westensee (A1427)
- Service: Commissioned from 1966, two remain in active service

=== Surveillance, reconnaissance, and ELINT ships ===
==== Oste class (Type 423) ====
- Displacement: 3,200 tons
- Performance: Speed 21 knots (39 km/h); Range 500 nautical miles (930 km)
- Ships in class: 3: Oste (A52), Oker (A53), and Alster (A50)
- Service: Commissioned from 1988, all in active service

=== Research ships ===
==== Alliance class (Type 753) ====
- Displacement: 2,744 tons
- Performance: 17 knots (31 km/h)
- Ships in class 1: Alliance (A1456)
- Service: In active service

Note: Alliance is a ship of the NATO under German flag and command.

==== Planet class (Type 751) ====
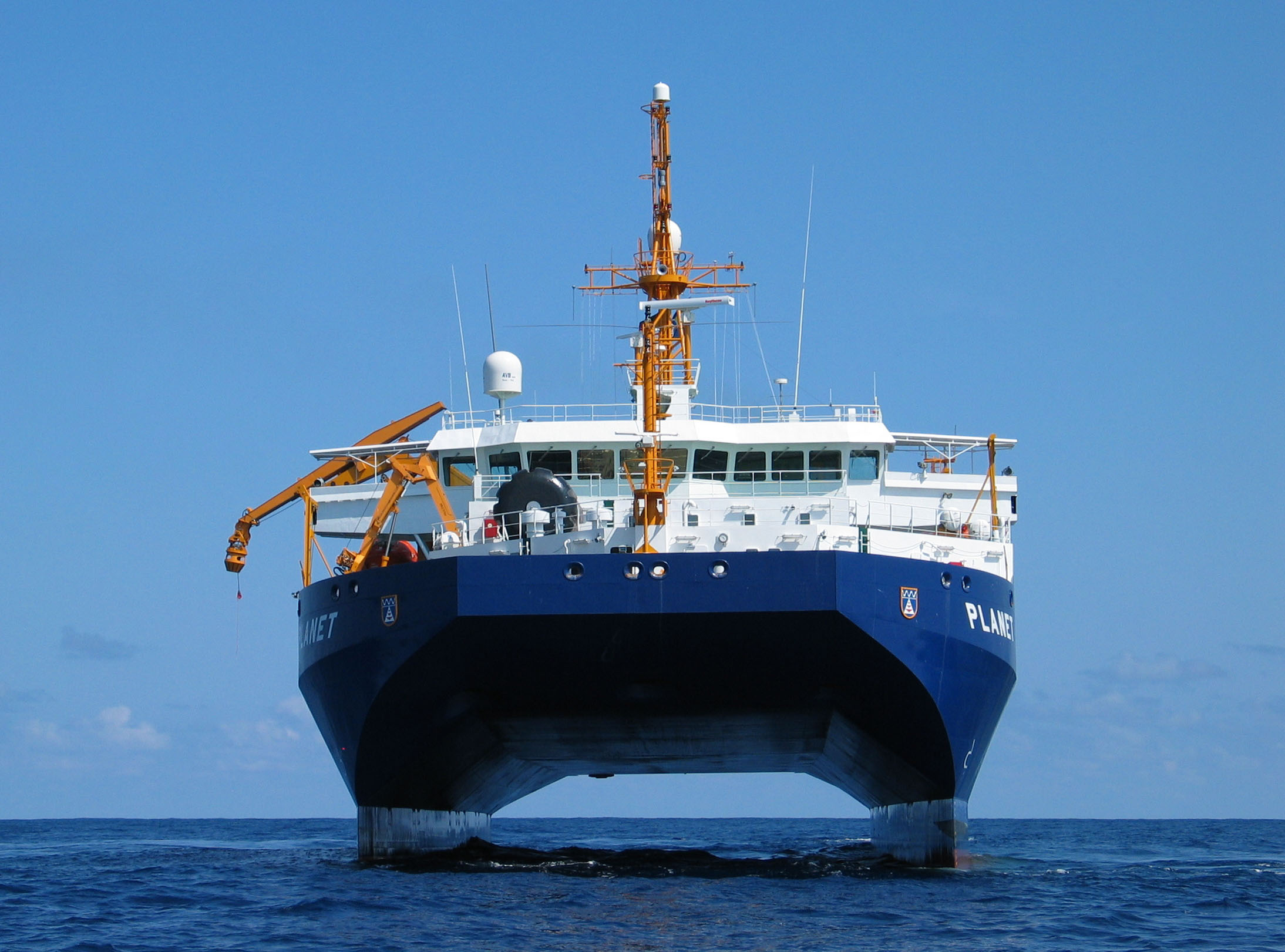
Planet (A1437)

- Displacement: 3,500 tons
- Performance: Speed 15 knots (28 km/h)
- Ships in class: 1: Planet (A1437)
- Service: Commissioned in 2005, in active service

==== Helmsand class (Type 748) ====
- Service: 3 in active service: Helmsand (Y862), Kronsort (Y861), Stollergrund (Y863)

==== Wilhelm Pullwer class (Type 741) ====
- Service: 1 in active service

=== Tugs ===
==== Wangerooge class (Type 722) ====
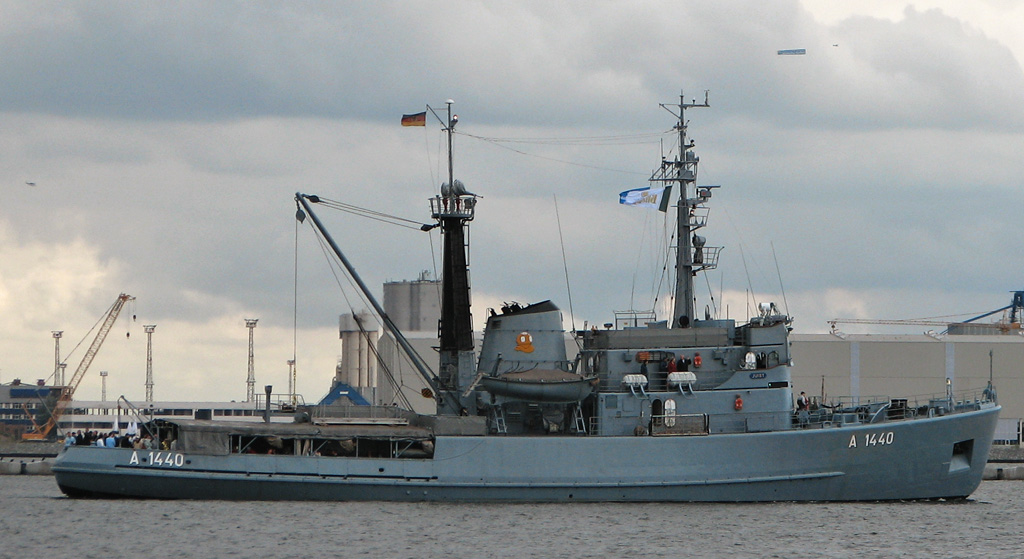
Juist (A1456)

- Displacement: 798 tons
- Performance: Speed 12 knots (22 km/h)
- Ships in class: 6: Wangerooge (A1451), Spiekeroog (A1452), Langeoog (A1453), Baltrum (A1454), Norderney (A1455), and Juist (A1456)
- Service: Commissioned from 1968, two remain in active service

==== Helgoland class (Type 720) ====
- Ships in class: 2: Helgoland (A1457) and Fehmarn (A1458)
- Service: Commissioned from 1966, Fehmarn remains in active service

=== Icebreakers ===
==== Eisvogel class (Type 721) ====
- Displacement: 560 tons
- Performance: Speed 14 knots (26 km/h)
- Ships in class: 2: Eisvogel (A1401) and Eisbär (A1402)
- Service: Commissioned from 1961, both decommissioned, one sold, one scrapped

=== Training ships (Schulschiffe) ===
==== Deutschland (Type 440) ====
- Displacement: 3,200 tons
- Armament: 4 x 100 mm guns; 2 x twin 40 mm guns, 2 x 40 mm guns; 2 x 533 mm torpedo tubes; 2 x quad 375 mm anti submarine rocket launchers, 2 x depth charge rails; mines
- Performance: Speed 21 knots (39 km/h)
- Ships in class: 1
- Service: Commissioned 1966, decommissioned 1990

==== Gorch Fock (Type 441) ====
- Displacement: 1,760 tons
- Performance: Speed 13 knots (24 km/h)
- Ships in class: 1
- Service: Commissioned 1958, in active service

=== Transport ships ===
==== Westerwald class (Type 760) ====
- Displacement: 4,042 tons
- Performance: Speed 17 knots (31 km/h)
- Ships in class: 2: Westerwald (A1435) and Odenwald (A1436)
- Service: Commissioned from 1967, Westerwald remains in active service

=== Oil recovery ships ===
==== Bottsand class (Type 738) ====
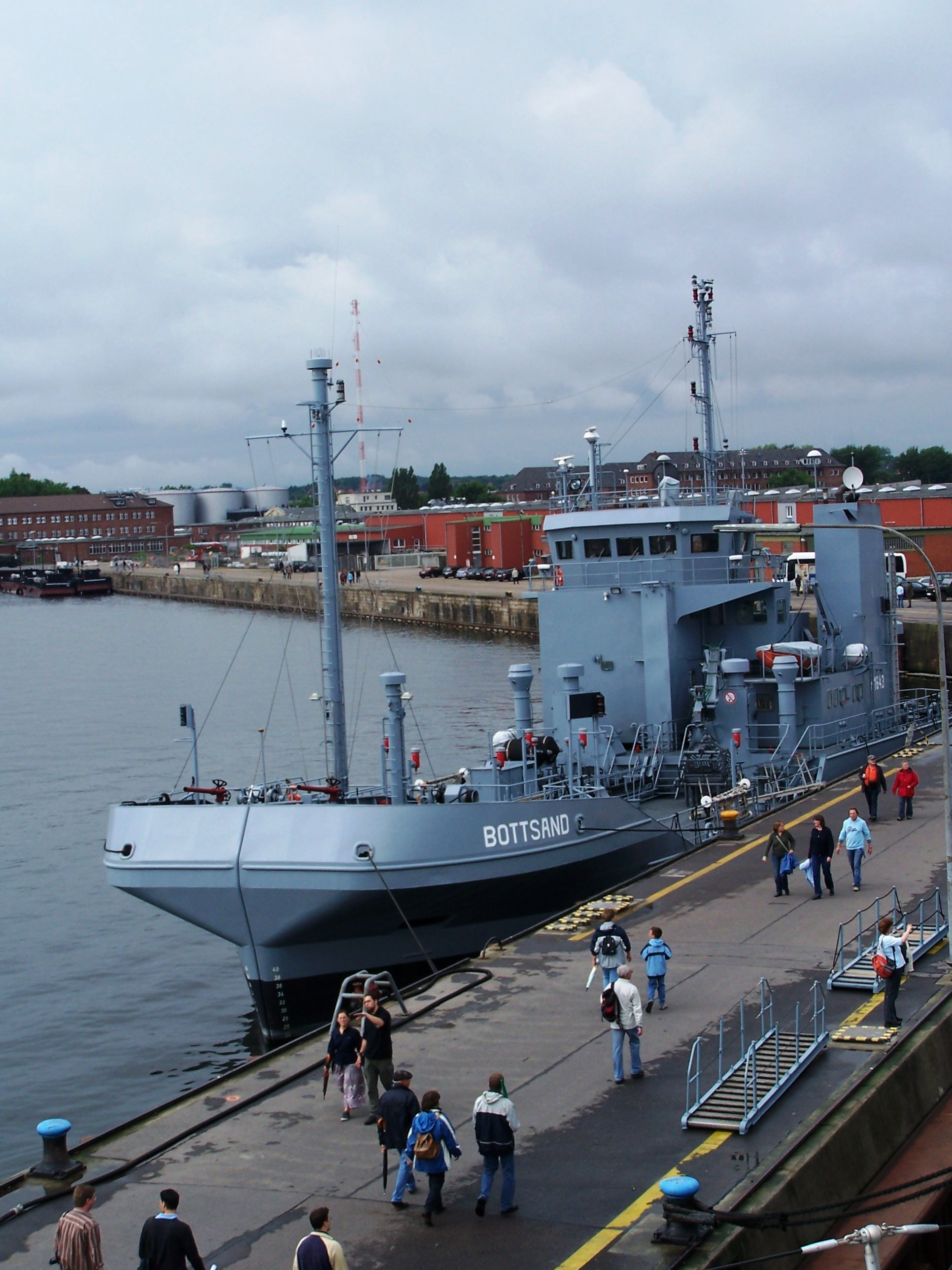
Bottsand-class oil recovery ship

- Displacement: 650 tons
- Performance: Speed 10 knots (19 km/h)
- Ships in class: 2: Bottsand (Y1643) and Eversand (Y1644)
- Service: 2 in active service

== Bibliography ==
- Sieche, Erwin (1980). "Germany". In Chesneau, Roger (ed.). Conway's All the World's Fighting Ships 1922–1946. London: Conway Maritime Press. pp. 218–254. ISBN 0-85177-146-7.
