= Dyson (surname) =

Dyson is an English surname. Notable people with the surname include:

- Ambrose Dyson (1876–1913), Australian political cartoonist
- Andre Dyson (born 1979), American football player
- Anthony Edward Dyson (1928–2002), British literary critic
- Brian Dyson (born 1935), American businessman
- Charles Wilson Dyson (1861–1930), American naval officer
- Chris Dyson (born 1978), American racing driver
- David Dyson (naturalist), (1823–1856) British naturalist, scientific collector, curator and weaver
- Edward Dyson (1865–1931), Australian writer and journalist
- Edward Ambrose Dyson (1908–1952), Australian illustrator and political cartoonist
- Esther Dyson (born 1951), Swiss-born American journalist, author, businesswoman, investor, commentator, and philanthropist
- Frank Dyson (1931–1979), British rugby league footballer
- Frank Watson Dyson (1868–1939), English astronomer
- Freeman Dyson (1923–2020), British-American physicist
- Geoff Dyson (1923–1989), English footballer
- George Dyson (composer) (1883–1964), English musical composer
- George Dyson (science historian) (born 1953), American-Canadian author and science historian
- H. Kempton Dyson (1880–1944), English structural engineer and architect
- Hugo Dyson (1896–1975), English academic
- Humfrey Dyson (1582–1633), English scrivener, notary, and book collector
- Jack Dyson (1934–2000), English cricketer and footballer
- James Dyson (born 1947), British inventor and engineer
- Jeremy Dyson (born 1966), English author, musician, and screenwriter
- Jerome Dyson (born 1987), American basketball player in Israel
- John Dyson (rugby) (1866–1909), English rugby union player
- John Barry Dyson (1942–1995), English footballer
- John Dyson, Lord Dyson (born 1943), British judge
- John Dyson (Australian cricketer) (born 1954), Australian cricketer
- John S. Dyson (fl. 1960s–2020s), American businessman
- John Dyson (fl. 1980s), English musician
- Kenny Dyson (born 2001), American football player
- Kevin Dyson (born 1975), American football player
- Kina Malpartida Dyson (born 1980), Peruvian boxer
- Marianne J. Dyson (fl. 1990s–2010s), American author
- Mia Dyson (born 1981), Australian musician
- Michael Eric Dyson (born 1958), American author, preacher, radio host, and professor
- Rada Dyson-Hudson (1930–2016), American anthropologist
- Rob Dyson (born 1946), American racing driver
- Ronnie Dyson (1950–1990), American singer and actor
- Ruth Dyson (born 1957), New Zealand politician
- Ruth Dyson (keyboardist) (1917–1997), English keyboardist
- Terry Dyson (born 1934), English footballer
- Thomas A. Dyson (1851–1898), American politician
- Tony Dyson (1947–2016), British special effects designer
- Torkwase Dyson (fl. 2000s–2010s), American contemporary artist
- Will Dyson (1880–1938), Australian artist, cartoonist, and caricaturist
- William Dyson (1857–1936), English cricketer

== See also ==
- Dyson, other uses
- Dyson (given name)
- Miles Bennett Dyson, fictional character from the film Terminator 2 who was the most directly responsible for "Judgement Day"
