= German ship Schleswig-Holstein =

Several naval ships of Germany were named Schleswig-Holstein after the federal state of Schleswig-Holstein:

- SMS Schleswig-Holstein (battleship): 13,000-ton Deutschland-class battleship, launched 1906
- German destroyer Schleswig-Holstein (D182): Hamburg-class (Type 101A) destroyer, scrapped 1998
- German frigate Schleswig-Holstein: Brandenburg-class (Type 123) frigate
