= Dyson =

Dyson may refer to:

- Dyson (surname), people with the surname Dyson
- Dyson (given name), people with the given name Dyson
- Dyson (company), a Singaporean multinational home appliances company founded by James Dyson
- Dyson (crater), a crater on the Moon
- Dyson (operating system), a Unix general-purpose operating system derived from Debian using the illumos kernel, libc, and SMF init system
- Dyson sphere, a hypothetical megastructure that completely encompasses a star and captures most or all of its power output
- Dyson tree, a hypothetical plant suggested by physicist Freeman Dyson
  - Eufloria (formerly called Dyson), a video game based on the idea of Dyson trees
- USS Dyson (DD-572), a United States Navy destroyer in commission from 1942 to 1947
- NOAAS Oscar Dyson (R 224), an American fisheries and oceanographic research ship in commission in the National Oceanic and Atmospheric Administration since 2005
- Dysons, an Australian bus operator
- Dyson, a character in the Canadian television series Lost Girl
- The Charles H. Dyson School of Applied Economics and Management, often referred to as "Dyson"
- Dyson, Louisiana

== See also ==
- Dysan, storage media company
