= German ship Bayern =

A number of vessels of the German Navy have borne the name Bayern, after Bavaria.

- SMS Bayern (1878), a Sachsen-class ironclad, in service 1881–1910.
- SMS Bayern, a Bayern-class battleship, in service 1916–1919.
- German destroyer Bayern, a Hamburg-class destroyer that served from 1965 to 1993 before being scrapped in 1998.
- German frigate Bayern, a Brandenburg-class frigate, in service since 1996.
