= Zerstörer 1-class destroyer =

Destroyers of the West German Navy

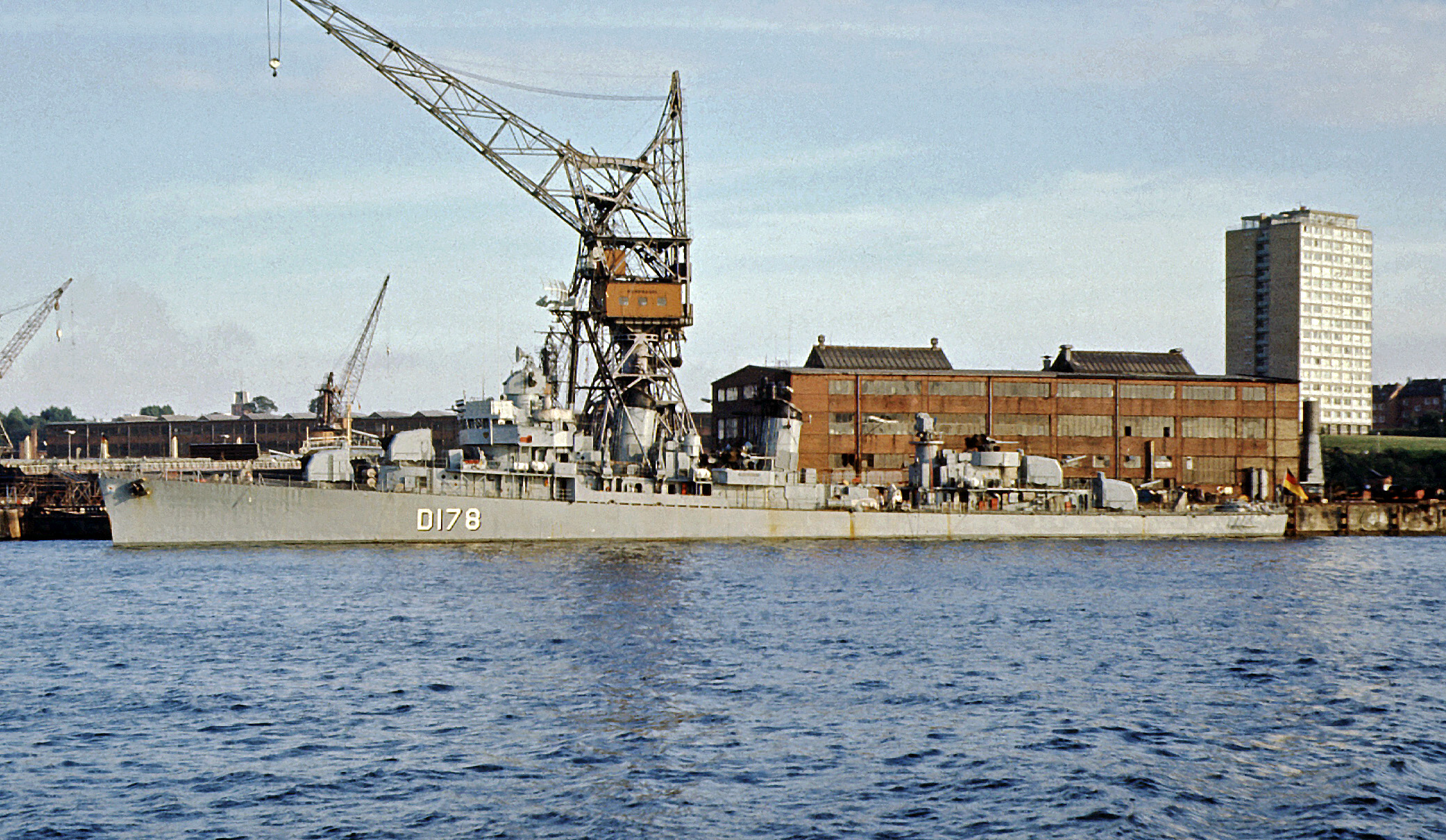
- Zerstörer 4

Class overview
- Name: Zerstörer 1
- Builders: Bath Iron Works; Consolidated Steel Corporation; Federal Shipbuilding and Drydock Company
- Operators: German Navy
- Succeeded by: Bremen class
- Built: 1941–1943
- In commission: 1958–1982
- Planned: 6
- Completed: 6
- Retired: 6

General characteristics
- Type: Destroyer
- Displacement: 2,050 long tons (2,083 t) standard; 2,500 long tons (2,540 t) full
- Length: 376.5 ft (114.8 m)
- Beam: 39.5 ft (12.0 m)
- Draft: 17.5 ft (5.3 m)
- Propulsion: 4 × GM Mod. 16-278A diesel engines with electric drive, 60,000 shp (45,000 kW); 2 × screws
- Speed: 36.5 knots (67.6 km/h; 42.0 mph)
- Range: 5,500 nmi (10,200 km) at 15 kn (28 km/h; 17 mph)
- Complement: 329
- Sensors & processing systems: 1 × AN/SPS-6 air search radar; 1 × AN/SPS-10 surface-search radar; 1 × Mark 37 director
- Armament: 4 × single 5 in/38 cal guns; 3 × twin Mark 33 3 in/50 cal guns; 2 × single 533 mm torpedo tubes; 2 × Mark 10 Hedgehog mortars; 1 × depth charge track

The Type 119 Zerstörer 1 class was a class of six destroyers of the West German Navy. They entered service in 1958, with the last one being decommissioned in 1982.

== History ==
Since time for planning, building and testing its own larger ships was not available, the Federal Republic of Germany received six destroyers of the Fletcher class for the German Navy from the United States from 1958 to 1960 as part of the Mutual Defense Assistant Act. An option for the surrender of five more destroyers was not taken. After the loan period was extended, the four units that were still available at that time were purchased in 1976 for the equivalent of an estimated €191,500 each.

They were not given any names when they were commissioned; they were only numbered from 1 to 6. It was not until 1960 that they were given the names Zerstörer 1 to Zerstörer 6. In common parlance, the destroyers continued to be called Z-1, Z-2, Z-3, Z-4, Z-5 and Z-6.

After their commissioning, the first three destroyers were assigned to the 1st Destroyer Squadron, and the other three to the 3rd Destroyer Squadron. The homeport for all units was Kiel. The Zerstörer 3 was subordinated to the Fleet Service Squadron at Flensburg from 1 April 1974. From 1 October 1971, the remaining destroyers were combined in the 3rd Destroyer Squadron. After the dissolution of the 3rd Destroyer Squadron on 30 June 1981, the two remaining destroyers, Zerstörer 2 and Zerstörer 5, were placed under the 1st Destroyer Squadron until they were decommissioned.

After their decommissioning, Zerstörer 1 and Zerstörer 6 were cannibalized as spare parts reserves for the other destroyers. Zerstörer 6 was canceled and Zerstörer 1 was then used up as a target ship for naval aviation in the Mediterranean. On 16 May 1979, the destroyer Zerstörer 1 by the German submarine U-29 with a torpedo. The other destroyers were handed over to the Greek Navy as part of defense aid.

The tasks of the destroyers of the Zerstörer 1 class were taken over by the frigates of the Bremen class.

== Characteristics ==
Before the takeover, the ships were modernized to a considerable extent. All 20 mm Oerlikon cannons were removed and the 40 mm Bofors guns were replaced by three 76.2 mm twin flak guns. In order to gain the deck space required for these guns and the fire control equipment connected to them, the third 127 mm gun and the front quintuplet torpedo tube set had to be removed. The electronics were modernized and the mast was replaced by a tripod mast.

When the six destroyers were later in dock, the initially open bridges of the six destroyers were converted into an enclosed bridge while at the same time being enlarged. Three destroyers (Zerstörer 2, Zerstörer 3, and Zerstörer 4) were each provided with a small hut on the back of the bridge. Furthermore, all six ships were retrofitted with two U-defense torpedo tubes (single 533 mm). Later the second quintuplet torpedo tube set was also removed.

From the beginning of the 1960s to 1962, Zerstörer 4 had two 40 mm Bofors flak MELs in the positions of the 76.2 mm flak on the port and starboard side. For testing purposes, a containerized 76 mm OTO Melara gun was carried from 1974 to early 1975 instead of the eighth 76.2 mm anti-aircraft twin.

== Ships in the class ==
Pennant	Name	Builders	Laid down	Launched	Commissioned	Decommissioned
D 170	Zerstörer 1	Federal Shipbuilding and Drydock Company	25 June 1942	11 November 1942	1 January 1958	17 March 1972
D 171	Zerstörer 2	Bath Iron Works	17 August 1942	20 December 1942	14 June 1959	18 September 1981
D 172	Zerstörer 3	Bath Iron Works	18 August 1942	18 August 1943	6 October 1959	15 October 1980
D 178	Zerstörer 4	Consolidated Steel Corporation	14 May 1941	16 March 1942	15 December 1959	26 February 1981
D 179	Zerstörer 5	Consolidated Steel Corporation	25 June 1941	1 April 1942	17 February 1960	26 February 1982
D 180	Zerstörer 6	Consolidated Steel Corporation	25 June 1941	15 April 1942	12 April 1960	9 October 1967

== Gallery ==
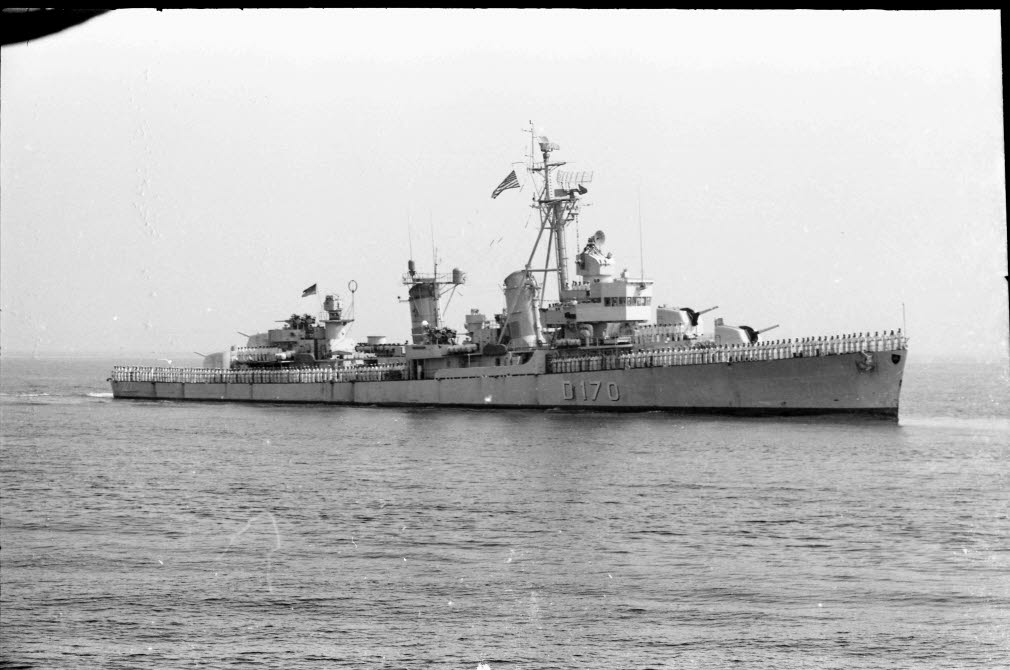
Zerstörer 1

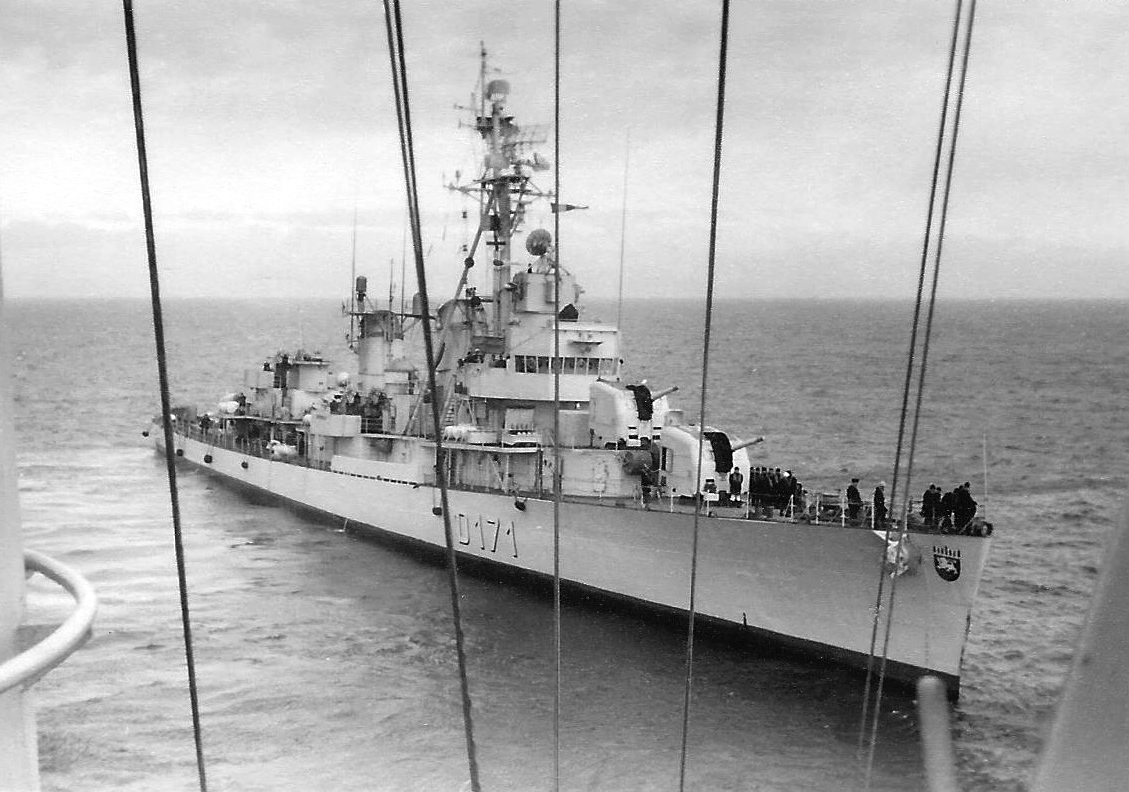
Zerstörer 2

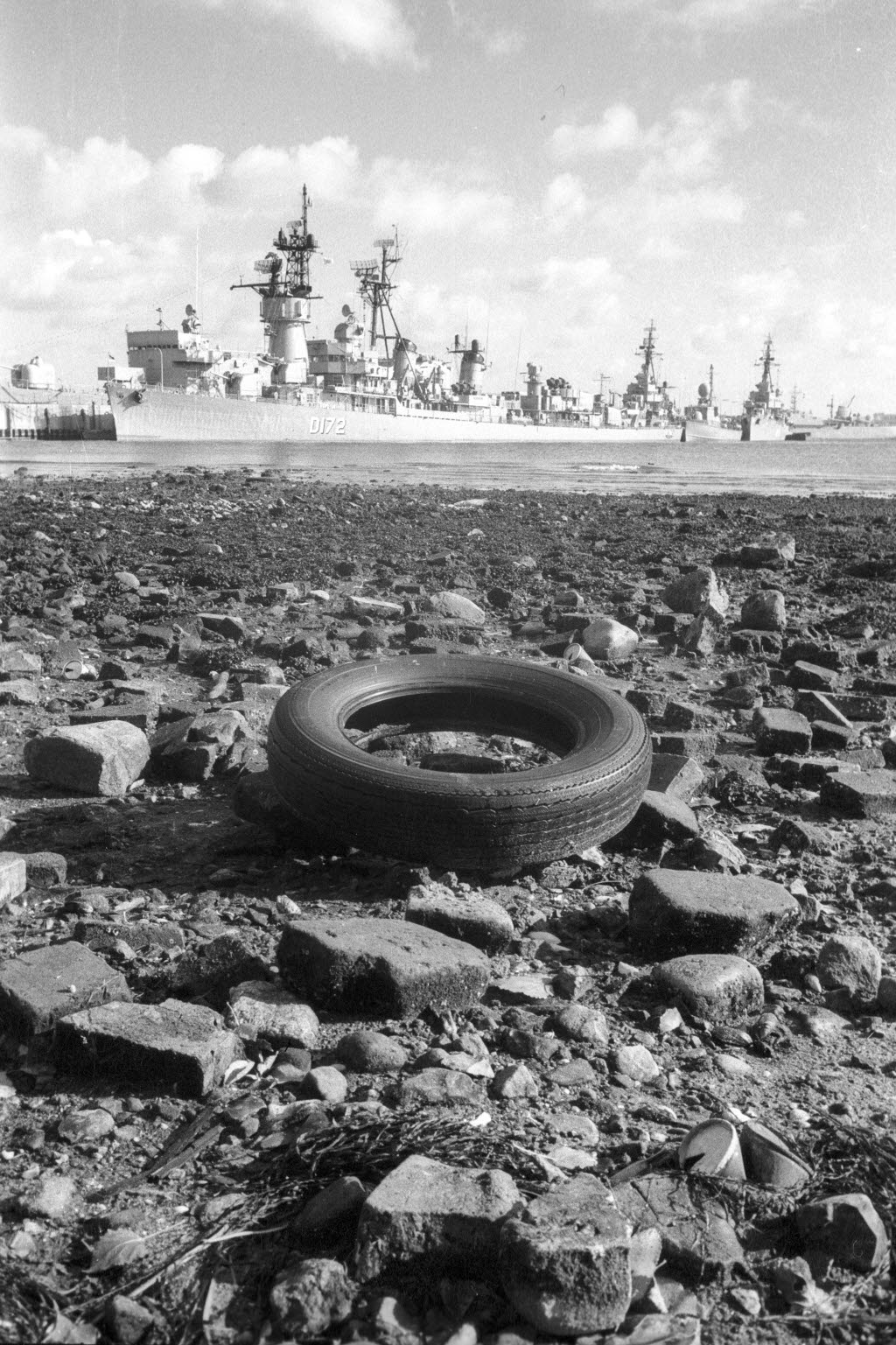
Zerstörer 3

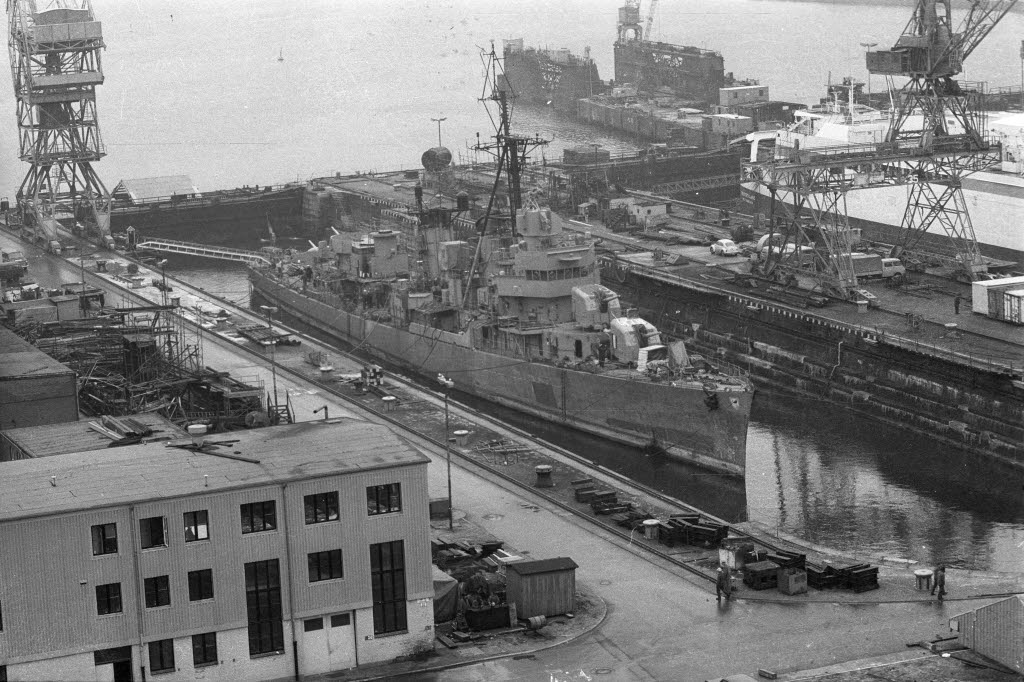
Zerstörer 4

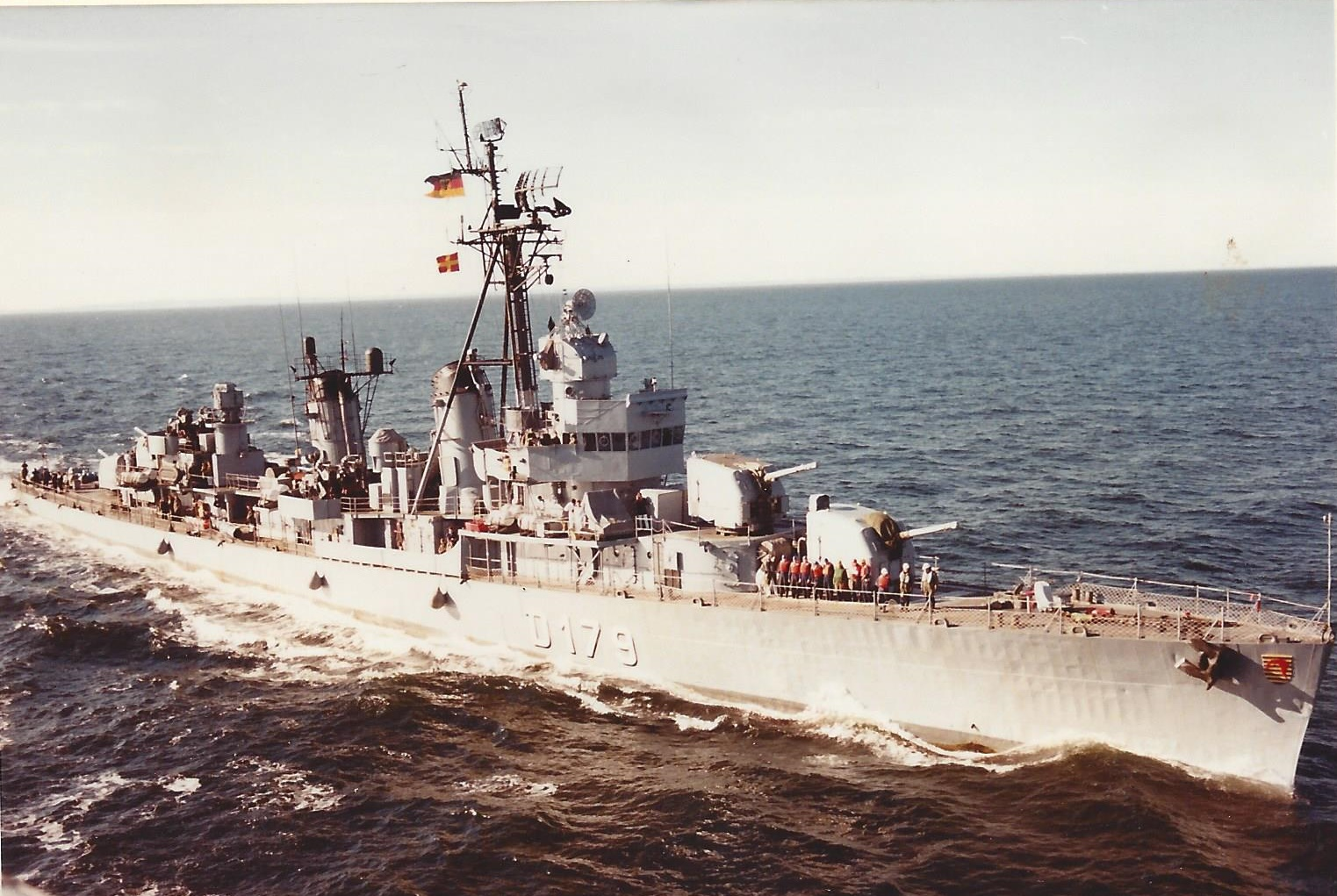
Zerstörer 5

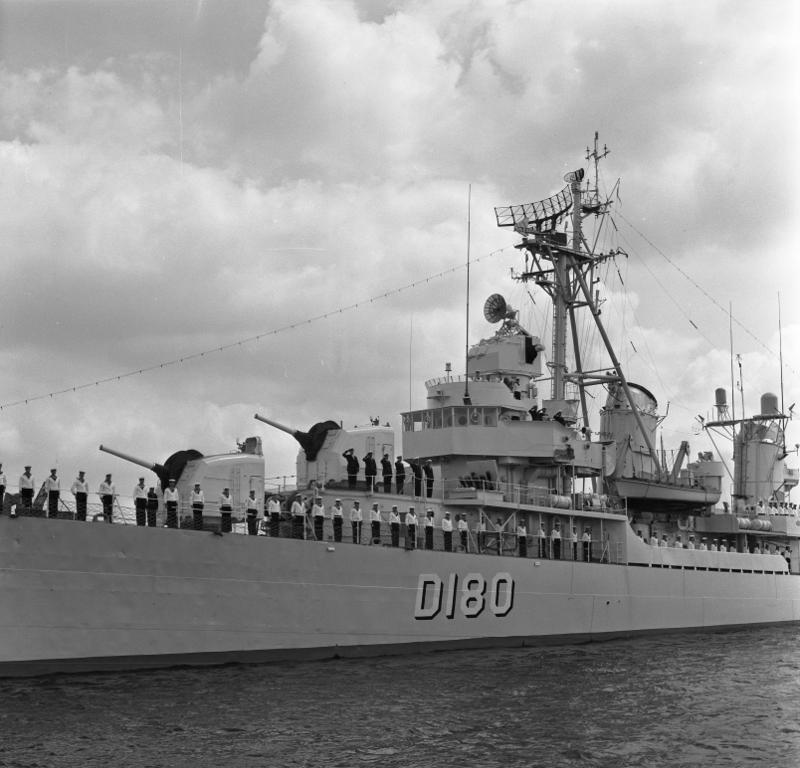
Zerstörer 6

== See also ==
- List of destroyers of Germany

Equivalent destroyers of the same era

- Skory class
- Holland class
- Ayanami class
- Östergötland class
- Artigliere class

== Citations ==
=== Bibliography ===
- Gardiner, Robert; Chumbley, Stephen; Budzbon, Przemysław, eds. (1995). Conway's All the World's Fighting Ships 1947–1995. Annapolis: Naval Institute Press. ISBN 1-55750-132-7.
