= German destroyer Hamburg =

Hamburg-class destroyer

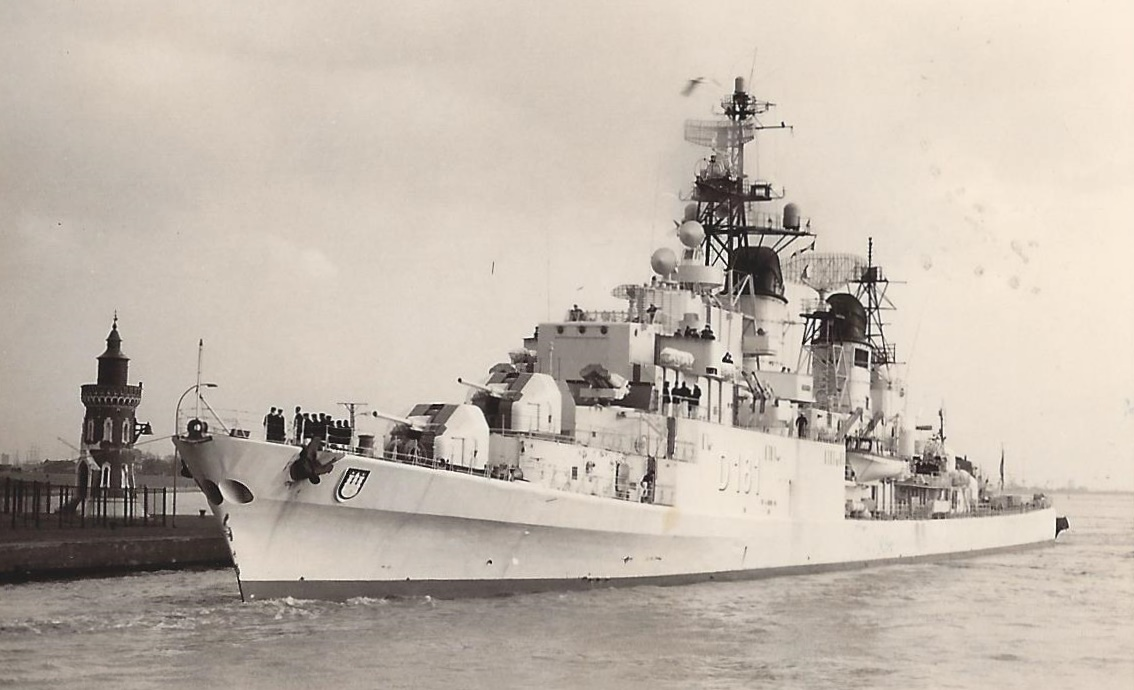
- Hamburg entering Kaiser lock, Bremerhaven in March 1971.

History

Germany
- Name: Hamburg
- Namesake: Hamburg
- Builder: H. C. Stülcken Sohn, Hamburg
- Laid down: 29 January 1959
- Launched: 26 March 1960
- Commissioned: 23 March 1964
- Decommissioned: 24 February 1994
- Identification: Pennant number: D181; Callsign: DRAA
- Fate: Scrapped in 1998

General characteristics
- Class & type: Hamburg-class destroyer
- Displacement: 4,050 tonnes
- Length: 133.7 m (438 ft 8 in)
- Beam: 13.4 m (44 ft 0 in)
- Draft: 4.8 m (15 ft 9 in)
- Propulsion: 4 × Wahodag boilers, 2 steam turbines, 72,000 shp
- Speed: 35 knots (65 km/h); 37 knots (69 km/h) only D182
- Range: 3,400 nautical miles (6,300 km) at 18 knots (33 km/h)
- Complement: 284
- Sensors & processing systems: 3 × HSA fire-control radars; Sonar 1BV2
- Armament: 3 × DCN 100 mm/L55 guns; 4 × twin 40 mm/L70 guns, Breda Mod 64; 2 × twin MM38 Exocet launcher; 2 × quadruple Bofors 375 mm anti-submarine rocket launchers; 2 × depth charge ramps, 10 depth charges; 4 × 533 mm torpedo tubes; up to 90 naval mines Mk 17; 2 × 20 barreled chaff

Hamburg (D181) was the lead ship of the Hamburg-class destroyer of the German Navy.

== Background ==
The Type 101 Hamburg class was the only class of destroyers built during post-war Germany. They were specifically designed to operate in the Baltic Sea, where armament and speed is more important than seaworthiness. They were named after Bundesländer (states of Germany) of West Germany.

The German shipyard Stülcken was contracted to design and build the ships. Stülcken was rather inexperienced with naval shipbuilding, but got the order, since the shipyards traditionally building warships for the German navies like Blohm + Voss, Howaldtswerke or Lürssen were all occupied constructing commercial vessels.

== Construction and career ==
Hamburg was laid down on 29 January 1959 and launched on 26 March 1960 in Hamburg. She was commissioned on 23 March 1964 and decommissioned on 24 February 1994. Finally towed to Spain and scrapped in 1998.

In 1969, the ships of North Atlantic Treaty Organisation Standing Naval Force Atlantic steam into Boston, Massachusetts. The leading ship is the USS McCaffery. The other STANAVFORLANT ships at that time were HMS Dido, Almirante Pereira da Silva, Hamburg, HNLMS Isaac Sweers and HMCS Assiniboine.

In July 1981, Hamburg participated in the 25th anniversary celebration of German naval aviation training in Pensacola, United States.

== Gallery ==
Hamburg Gallery

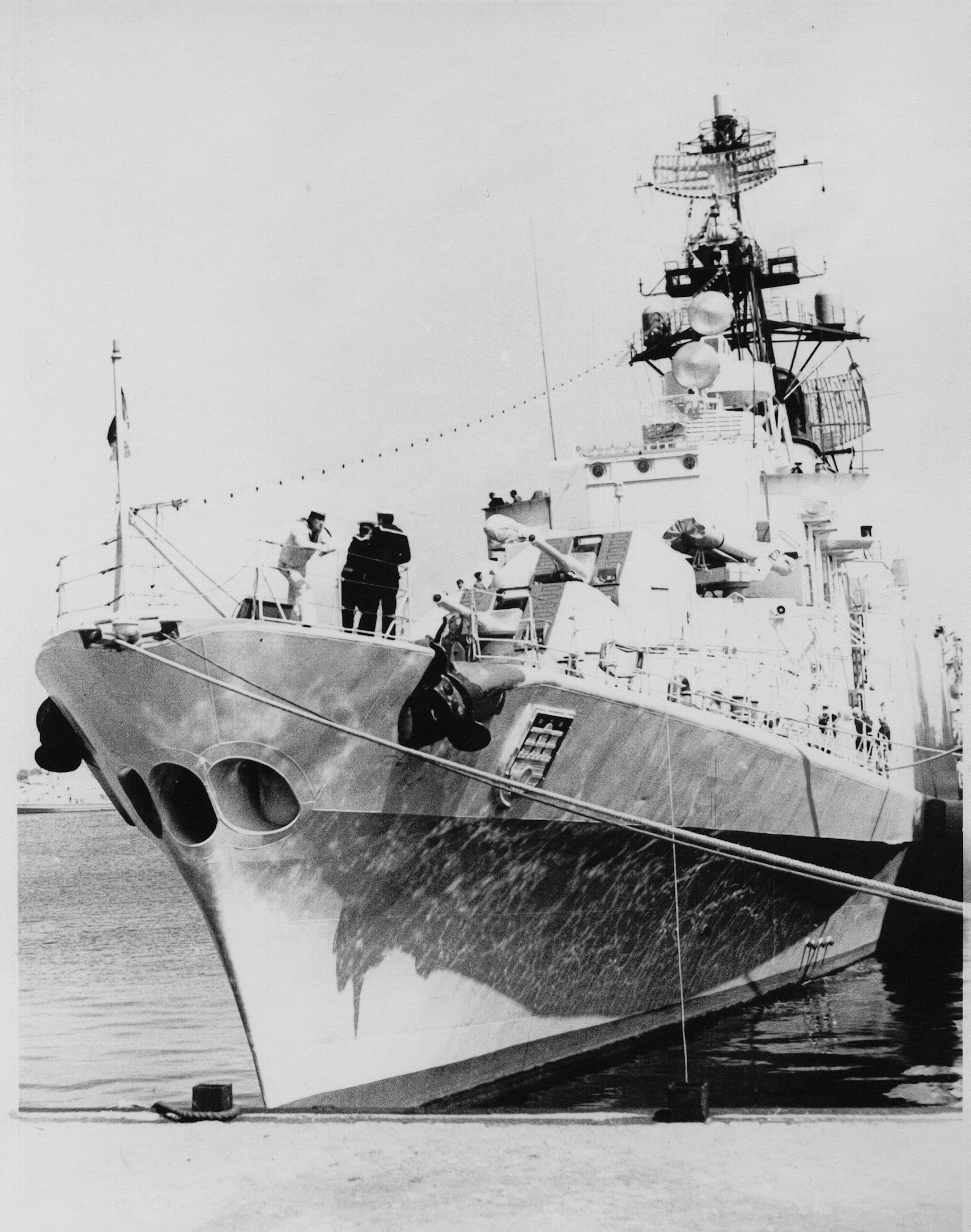
View of Hamburg’s bow in 1965.

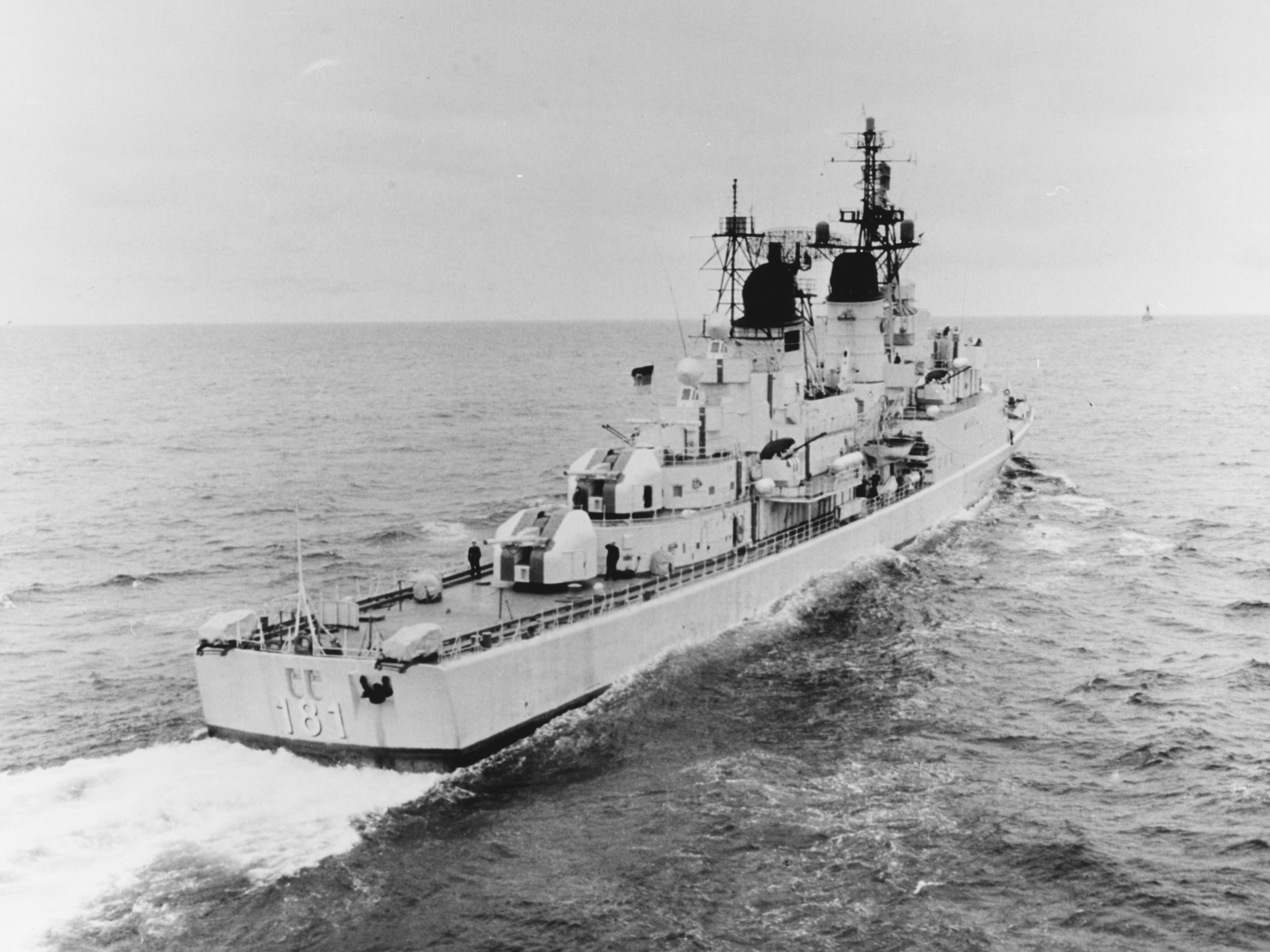
Hamburg underway in the Atlantic during Operation Peacekeeper on 24 September 1969.

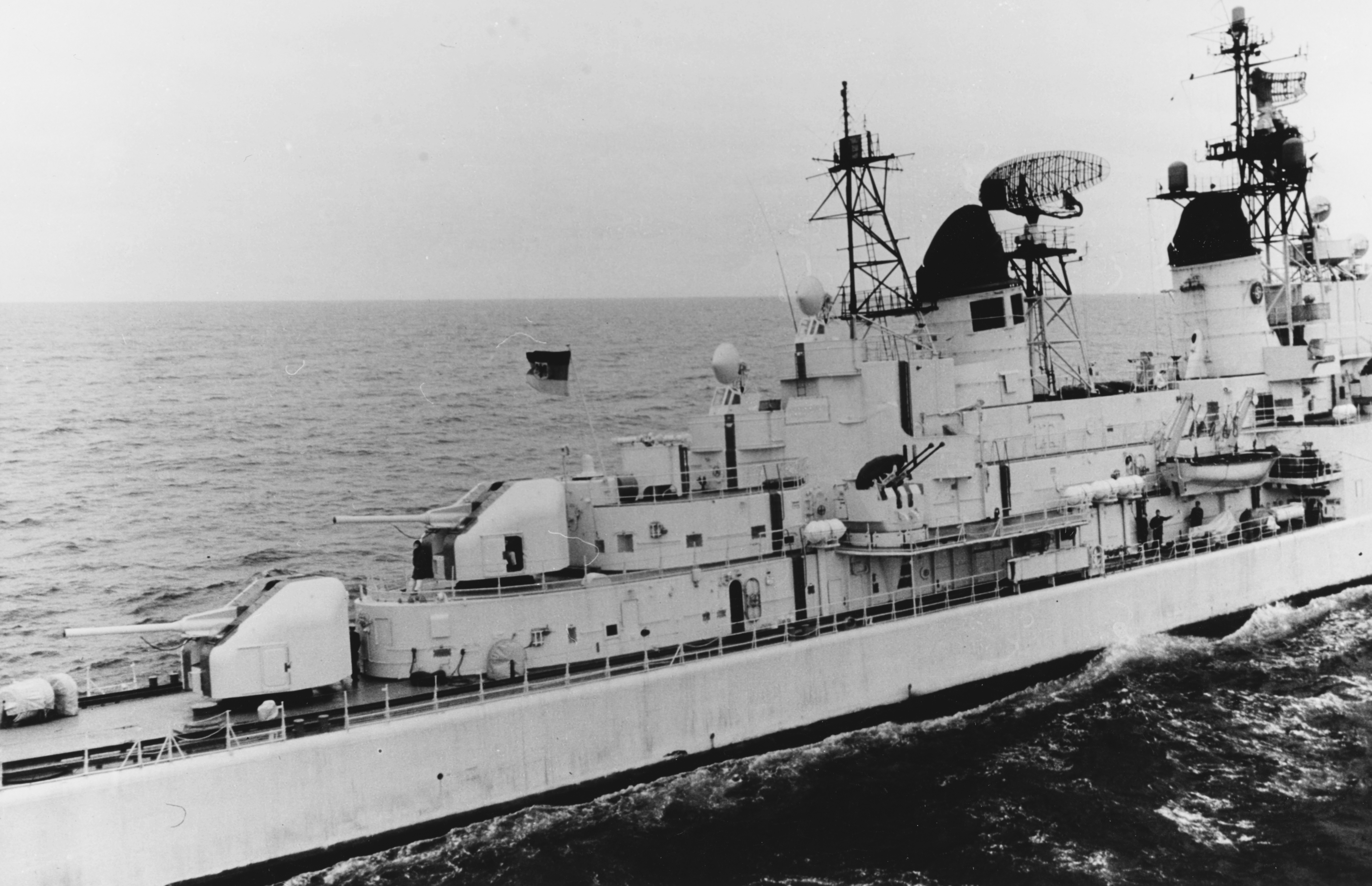
Hamburg underway in the Atlantic during Operation Peacekeeper on 24 September 1969.

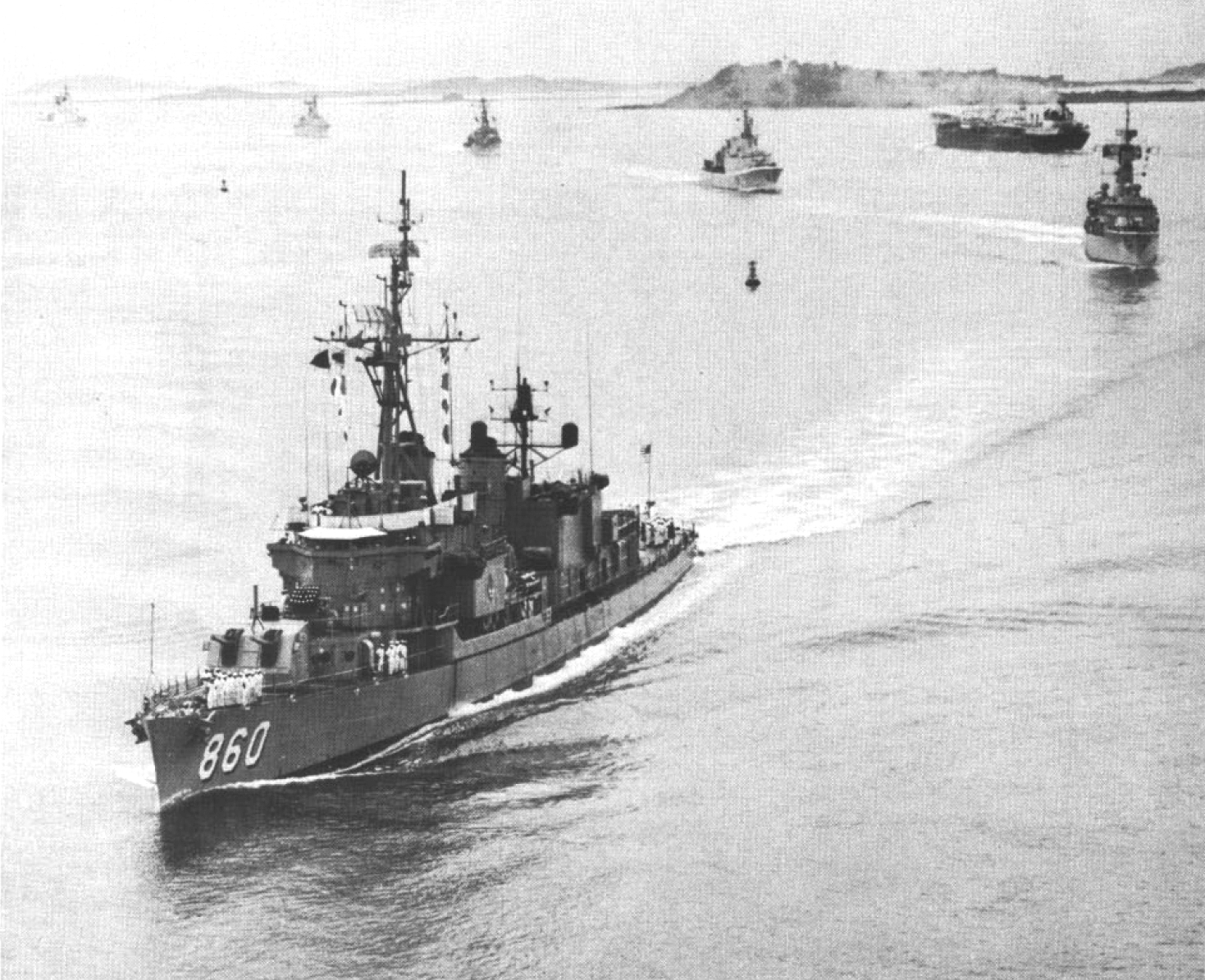
Hamburg (3rd ship) coming into Boston Harbor in 1969.

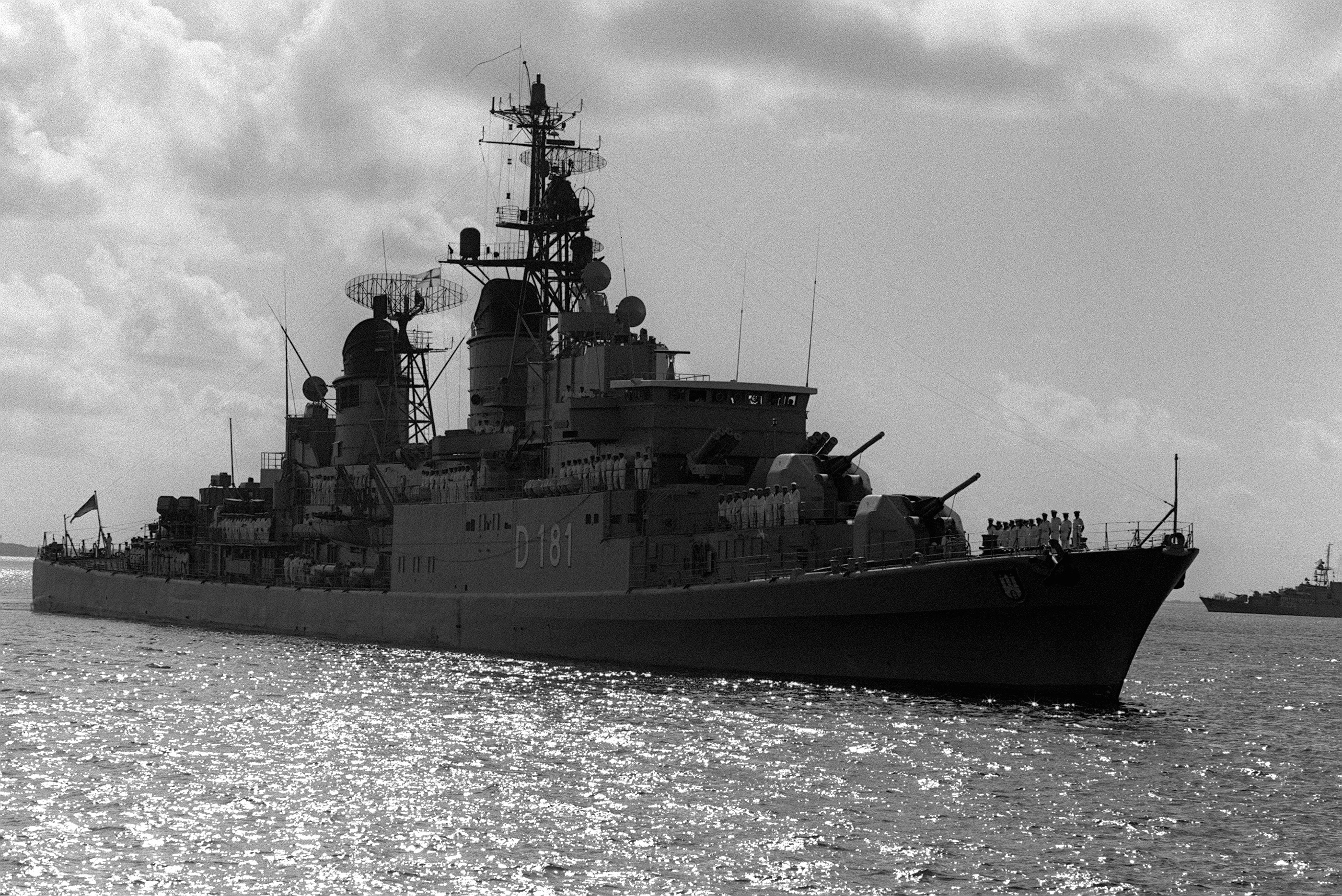
Hamburg at Pensacola on 6 July 1981.

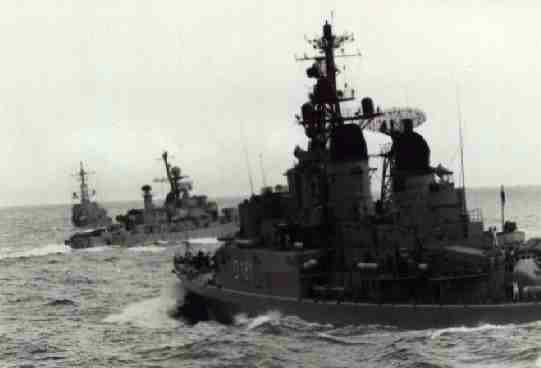
Hamburg underway with other NATO ships off Long Island, New York in the 1980s.
