= Dyson (given name) =

Dyson is a given name. Notable people with the given name include:

- Dyson Carter
- Dyson Daniels
- Dyson Falzon
- Dyson Hague
- Dyson Heppell
- Dyson Heydon
- Dyson Hore-Lacy
- Dyson Lovell
- Dyson Parody
- Dyson Sharp
- Dyson Williams
- Dyson Wilson

== See also ==
- Dyson (surname)
- Dyson (disambiguation)
