= USS Dyson =

United States Navy Fletcher-class destroyer

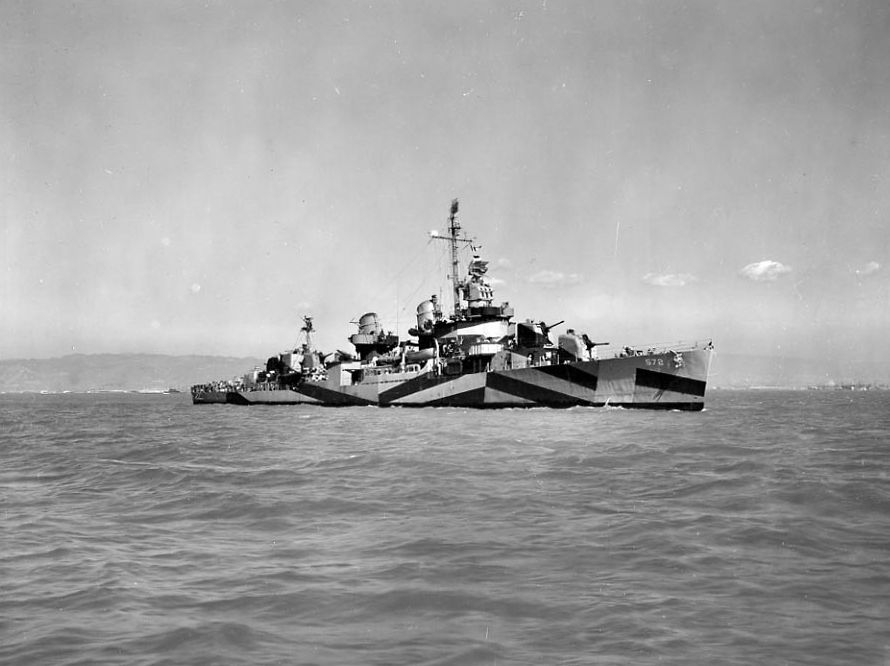
- USS Dyson (DD-572) at Sea 09-30-1944

History

United States
- Name: USS Dyson (DD-572)
- Namesake: Charles W. Dyson
- Builder: Consolidated Steel Corporation, Orange, Texas
- Laid down: 25 June 1941
- Launched: 15 April 1942
- Commissioned: 30 December 1942
- Decommissioned: 31 March 1947
- Stricken: 1 October 1974
- Fate: Transferred to West German Navy, 17 February 1960

History

West Germany
- Name: Zerstörer 5 (D179)
- Acquired: 17 February 1960
- Stricken: 1982
- Fate: Transferred to Greece for parts, February 1982

General characteristics
- Class & type: Fletcher-class destroyer; Zerstörer 1-class destroyer
- Displacement: 2,050 long tons (2,080 t)
- Length: 376 ft 6 in (114.76 m)
- Beam: 39 ft 8 in (12.09 m)
- Draft: 17 ft 9 in (5.41 m)
- Propulsion: 60,000 shp (45 MW) ; 2 propellers
- Speed: 35 knots (65 km/h; 40 mph)
- Range: 6,500 nmi (12,000 km; 7,500 mi) at 15 knots (28 km/h; 17 mph)
- Complement: 329
- Armament: 5 × single Mk 12 5 in (127 mm)/38 guns; 5 × twin 40 mm (1.6 in) Bofors AA guns; 7 × single 20 mm (0.8 in) Oerlikon AA guns; 2 × quintuple 21 in (533 mm) torpedo tubes; 6 × single depth charge throwers; 2 × depth charge racks

USS Dyson (DD-572) was a Fletcher-class destroyer of the United States Navy. She was named for Rear Admiral Charles W. Dyson (1861–1930).

Dyson was launched 15 April 1942 by Consolidated Steel Corporation, Orange, Tex., sponsored by Mrs. Charles Dyson, widow of Rear Admiral Dyson; and commissioned 30 December 1942, Commander Roy Alexander Gano in command.

== Service history ==
=== United States Navy ===
==== World War II ====
===== 1943 =====
After escort and screening duty along the east coast and to the Caribbean, Dyson sailed from New York 14 May 1943 for the Pacific. She joined Task Force 36 (TF 36) at Nouméa, and served from this base and Espiritu Santo in support of the consolidation of the Solomons, patrolling, and escorting convoys. In August she began operating in the Solomons themselves. On the night of 3/4 September in company with Pringle she intercepted and sank two barges and damaged another between Choiseul and Kolombangara while patrolling to block Japanese movements by water. Later that month on a similar sweep, she fired on an unidentified ship which burned and disappeared from sight.

Returning to Espiritu Santo in October 1943, Dyson with the other ships of the famed Destroyer Squadron 23 (DesRon 23) sailed to cover the landings at Cape Torokina, Bougainville, and on 1 November made an attack on airfields in the Buka-Monis area and the Shortland Islands to deny their use by the Japanese to attack the Allied landings. That night in the Battle of Empress Augusta Bay, TF 39 intercepted and turned back a Japanese force sailing to attack the transports in the bay. The torpedo attacks and gunfire of Dyson and the other destroyers were a significant factor in sinking a Japanese cruiser and destroyer, and damaging four other enemy ships.

Dyson saw action in the bombardment of Buka Airdrome 17 November, and on the night of 24/25 November, took part in the classic destroyer action, the Battle of Cape St. George in which Captain Arleigh Burke's destroyers sank three Japanese destroyers and severely damaged two more which were attempting to evacuate aviation personnel from the doomed Buka area to New Britain. The "Little Beavers" of Destroyer Squadron 23 won this striking victory without a casualty.

===== 1944 =====
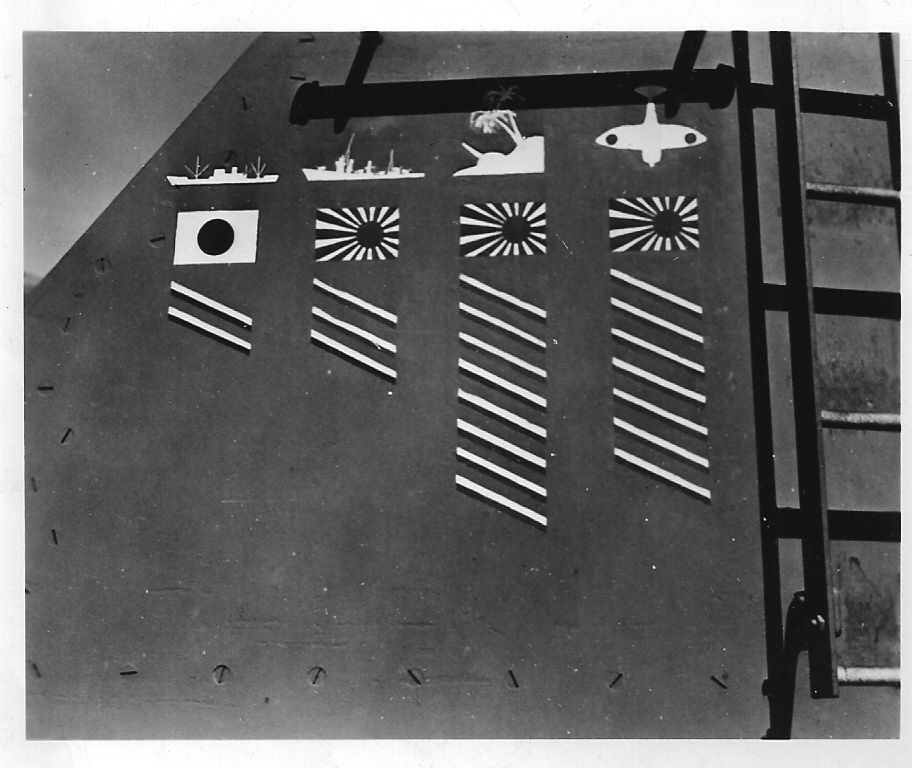
1944 - Scoreboard on the ship's gun director which indicates: 2 Japanese merchant ships sunk, 3 Japanese warships sunk, 8 shore bombardments, 7 Japanese planes shot down

Dyson remained in the Solomons until March 1944. She continued to harass the coast of Bougainville and patrol the shipping lanes to Rabaul to prevent Japanese reinforcements from reaching the northern Solomons. In February she joined the support force for the invasion of Green Island, then made two sweeps off New Ireland hunting Japanese shipping and bombarding Kavieng. On the second of these, on 22 February the destroyers sank two cargo vessels, a destroyer-minelayer, a patrol craft and two barges, and Dyson captured 31 of the 73 prisoners of war taken from Claudia Maru. On 23 February she pounded shore targets on Duke of York Island, and in March joined TF 31 to cover the invasion of Emirau.

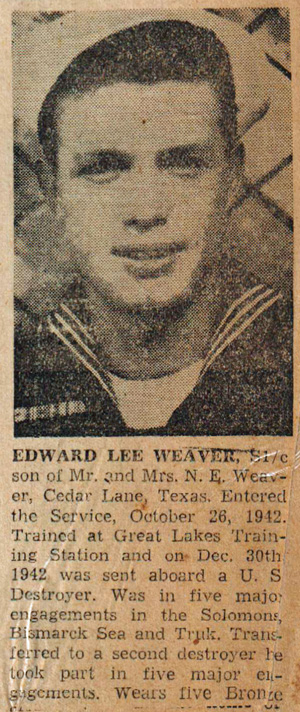
S1c Edward Lee Weaver served on the Dyson during the war before transferring to the USS Lindsey.

Dyson joined TF 58 25 March 1944 and screened the fast carriers during the raids on Palau, Yap, Ulithi and Woleai of 30 March to 1 April; the Hollandia operations from 21 to 23 April; and the strikes on Truk, Satawan and Ponape from 29 April to 1 May. After replenishing at Majuro, she sortied with TF 58 again in June for preinvasion strikes on Saipan and Pagan and diversionary raids on the Bonins, screened the carriers during the Battle of the Philippine Sea, then began direct participation in the capture of the Marianas. She hunted Japanese shipping off Guam and Rota, bombarded gun emplacements and fired on barges.

After a west coast overhaul, Dyson joined TF 38 at Ulithi in November and took part in the strikes on Luzon, Formosa, the China coast, and the Nansei Shoto coordinated with the battle for Leyte and the invasion of Luzon.

===== 1945 =====
Reporting to TF 78 for duty in February 1945, she escorted convoys from San Pedro Bay to Subic Bay and patrolled and bombarded troop concentrations in the capture of Corregidor. When Saunter was damaged by a mine 26 February, Dyson took off her wounded and aided in the salvage operations. The destroyer continued to serve in the Philippines, taking part in the landings on Panay, Negros, and Mindanao Islands.

On 16 May 1945, Dyson arrived at Okinawa for patrol, radar picket, local escort, and air-sea rescue duty until the end of the war. She sailed for the States 10 September, arriving at Washington, D.C., 17 October. Two days later Secretary of the Navy, James V. Forrestal presented Destroyer Squadron 23 with the Presidential Unit Citation for their outstanding performance in action in the Solomons in 1943–44.

Reporting to the Naval Base at Charleston, South Carolina, Dyson furnished electrical power for a group of decommissioned destroyers until placed out of commission in reserve 31 March 1947. On 17 February 1960, Dyson was lent to the Federal Republic of Germany.

=== Bundesmarine ===
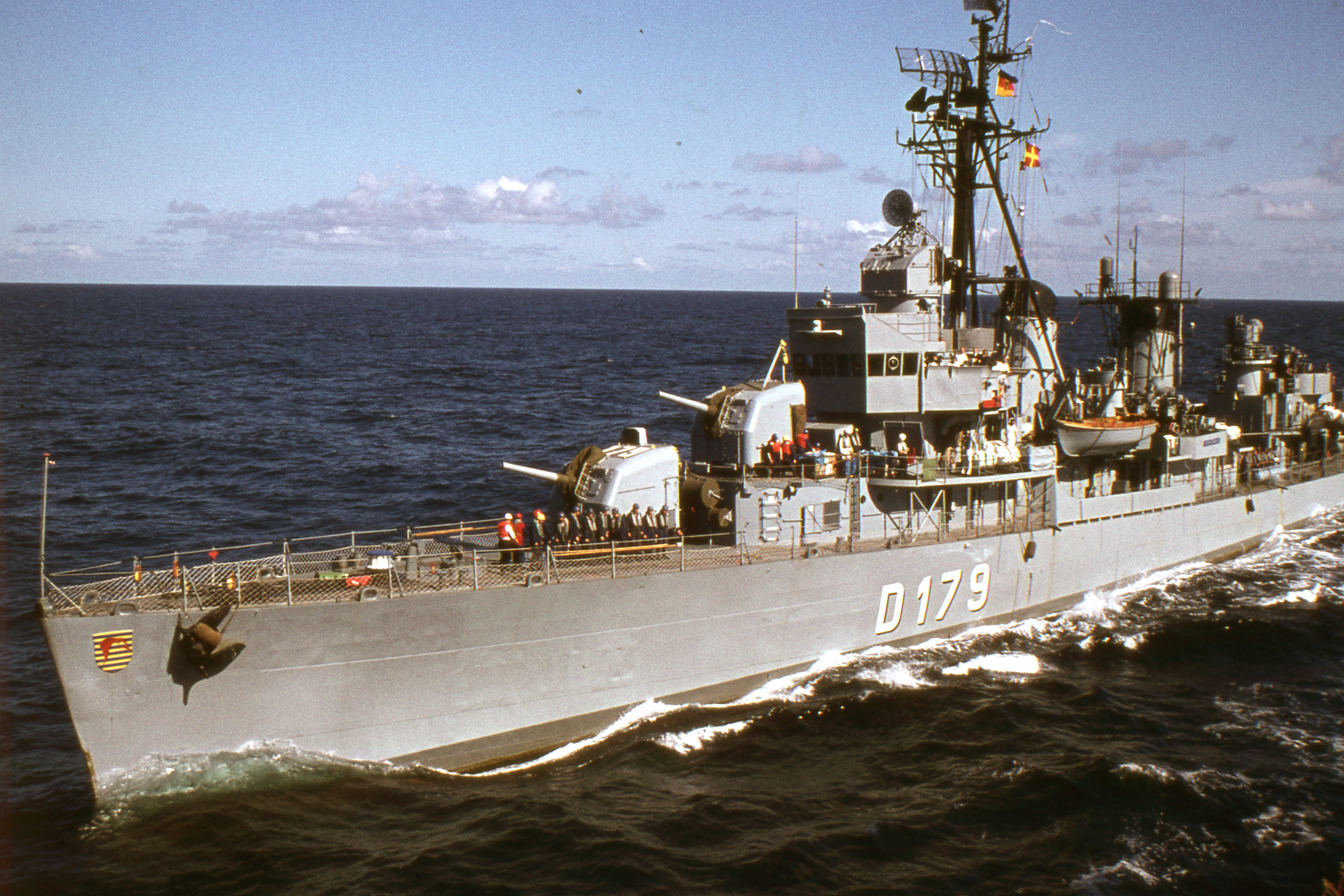
Zerstörer 5 preparing for replenishment at sea

The ship served in the Bundesmarine as Zerstörer 5 (D-179). Zerstörer 5 was stricken and transferred to Greece February 1982, where she was cannibalized to provide spare parts for other ships.

== Awards ==
In addition to her Presidential Unit Citation, Dyson received 11 battle stars for World War II service.
