= German destroyer Bayern =

Hamburg-class destroyer

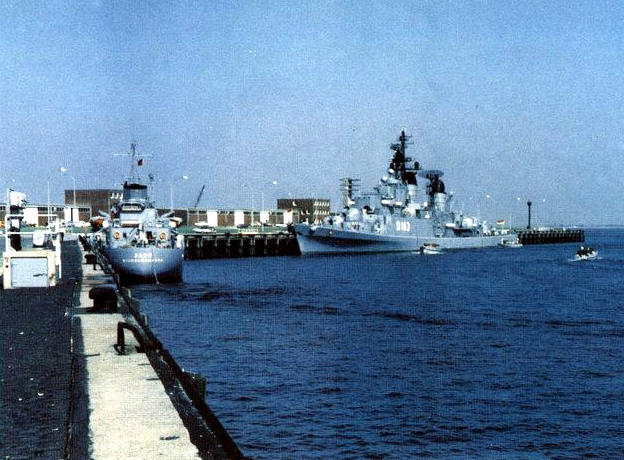
- Bayern in 1975.

History

Germany
- Name: Bayern
- Namesake: Bayern
- Builder: H. C. Stülcken Sohn, Hamburg
- Laid down: 15 February 1961
- Launched: 14 August 1962
- Commissioned: 6 July 1965
- Decommissioned: 16 December 1993
- Identification: Pennant number: D183; Callsign: DRAC
- Fate: Scrapped in 1998

General characteristics
- Class & type: Hamburg-class destroyer
- Displacement: 4,050 tonnes
- Length: 133.7 m (438 ft 8 in)
- Beam: 13.4 m (44 ft 0 in)
- Draft: 4.8 m (15 ft 9 in)
- Propulsion: 4 × Wahodag boilers, 2 steam turbines, 72,000 shp
- Speed: 35 knots (65 km/h); 37 knots (69 km/h) only D182
- Range: 3,400 nautical miles (6,300 km) at 18 knots (33 km/h)
- Complement: 284
- Sensors & processing systems: 3 × HSA fire-control radars; Sonar 1BV2
- Armament: 3 × DCN 100 mm/L55 guns; 4 × twin 40 mm/L70 guns, Breda Mod 64; 2 × twin MM38 Exocet launcher; 2 × quadruple Bofors 375 mm anti-submarine rocket launchers; 2 × depth charge ramps, 10 depth charges; 4 × 533 mm torpedo tubes; up to 90 naval mines Mk 17; 2 × 20 barreled chaff

Bayern (D183) was the third ship of the Hamburg-class destroyer of the German Navy.

== Background ==
The Type 101 Hamburg class was the only class of destroyers built during post-war Germany. They were specifically designed to operate in the Baltic Sea, where armament and speed is more important than seaworthiness. They were named after Bundesländer (states of Germany) of West Germany.

The German shipyard Stülcken was contracted to design and build the ships. Stülcken was rather inexperienced with naval shipbuilding, but got the order, since the shipyards traditionally building warships for the German navies like Blohm + Voss, Howaldtswerke or Lürssen were all occupied constructing commercial vessels.

== Construction and career ==
Bayern was laid down on 15 February 1961 and launched on 14 August 1962 in Hamburg. She was commissioned on 6 July 1965 and decommissioned on 16 December 1993. Finally towed to Denmark and scrapped in 1998.

The name Bayern was used again in 1994 for the frigate F217.
