= William Dyson =

English cricketer

William Lord Dyson (11 December 1857 – 1 May 1936) was an English first-class cricketer, who played two matches for Yorkshire County Cricket Club in 1887 against Sussex and Surrey.

Born in Rastrick, Brighouse, Yorkshire, England, Dyson was a right-handed batsman who scored 8 runs, at an average of 2.00, with a top score of 6. He did not bowl in first-class cricket, although he did take two catches in the field.

Dyson died in May 1936 in Brighouse.
