= Humfrey Dyson =

London scrivener and notary

Humfrey Dyson (c. 1582–1633) was a London scrivener and notary, and notable early book collector in England. He was the son of, Christopher Dyson, a wax-chandler of the parish of St Alban in central London. Humfrey himself may also have been a member of the wax-chandlers' company. Some accounts also identify him as a clerk of the Parliament of his day, though this is subject to doubt.

Dyson is remembered as an early book collector, catering to the emerging market for political and historical information. His notebooks for 1610–1630 furnish a rare source for the study of tracts and books, and pricing in the book trade of that period.

His collecting was focused on plays, tracts, broadsides, and proclamations. In 1618 he published, in folio, A Book containing all such Proclamations as were published during the Raigne of the late Queene Elizabeth.

He wrote out the will of Henry Condell (13 December 1627), and also witnessed the will and codicil which Nicholas Tooley, the actor in Shakespeare's company, made on 3 June 1623. His association with these two notarial acts have suggested Dyson may have had links to William Shakespeare’s circle. His father's will, of 1608, refers to two daughters, Humfrey's sisters, respectively named Judith and Susanna. These happen to be also the names Shakespeare gave to two of his own daughters (Judith Quiney, twin sister of Hamnet Shakespeare, and Susanna Hall). The Dyson household, in Wood Street, was not far from Silver Street, where Shakespeare was lodging in 1604. He was buried on 18 January 1632/3 at St Olave Old Jewry, London.

== Manuscripts ==
- Dyson, Humfrey. "Catalogue of all such Bookes touching as well the State Ecclesiastical as Temporall of the Realme of England." MS 117, Codrington Library, All Soul’s College, Oxford.
