= Charles Wilson Dyson =

- Born: January 2, 1861; Cambridge, Maryland
- Died: October 25, 1930 (aged 69); Washington, D.C.
- Military career
- Allegiance: USN
- Service years: 1883-1925
- Rank: Rear Admiral
- Conflicts: World War I
- Awards: Navy Cross; Distinguished Service Medal

Rear Admiral Charles Wilson Dyson (January 2, 1861 – October 25, 1930) was an American naval officer and engineer.

== Biography ==
Dyson graduated from the United States Naval Academy in June 1883. He was well known for his achievements in the field of engineering. His designs covered machinery for naval vessels of all types, including Saratoga (CV-3) and Lexington (CV-2). He wrote extensively for technical magazines and revised Durand's treatise on Marine Engineering. For his meritorious service while in charge of the Division of Design of the Bureau of Steam Engineering during World War I, he was awarded the Navy Cross and the Distinguished Service Medal.

Dyson was retired December 2, 1925, and died in Washington, D.C., October 25, 1930.

== Namesake ==
In 1942, the destroyer USS Dyson (DD-572) was named in his honor.
