= Monis =

Monis is a surname of the following people:

- Ernest Monis (1846–1929), French politician
- Hank Monis (1923–2011), Canadian musician
- Judah Monis (1683–1784), North America's first college instructor of Hebrew language
- Man Haron Monis (1964–2014) Iranian-Australian Islamic extremist

Other meanings:

- Moni people, indigenous people of Western New Guinea
