= List of destroyers of Germany =

The following is a list of destroyers and large torpedo boats of Germany. In naval terminology, a destroyer is a fast and maneuverable yet long-endurance warship intended to escort larger vessels in a fleet, convoy or battle group and defend them against smaller, powerful, short-range attackers. In the years prior to World War I the small attacking vessel was the torpedo boat, while the defender was termed a torpedo boat destroyer. In practice the destroyer, being also armed with torpedoes, came to replace the torpedo boat in its attacking function, as well as executing its protecting role.

In the Imperial German Navy, there was no clear distinction between torpedo boats and torpedo boat destroyers, which were all numbered in the same series, the number being preceded by a letter that represented the building contractor. A new numbering series began in 1911; hence years of construction are appended in brackets below, to distinguish the two series.

== Kaiserliche Marine ==
- 1898 Type Large Torpedo Boat
  - S90-class torpedo boat
  - G108-class torpedo boat
  - S114-class torpedo boat
  - S120-class torpedo boat
  - S126-class torpedo boat
  - G132-class torpedo boat
  - G137-class torpedo boat
- 1906 Type Large Torpedo Boat
  - S138-class torpedo boat
  - V150-class torpedo boat
  - V162-class torpedo boat
  - S165-class torpedo boat
  - G169-class torpedo boat
  - S176-class torpedo boat
  - V180-class torpedo boat
  - G192-class torpedo boat
- 1911 Type Large Torpedo Boat
  - V1-class destroyer
  - G7-class destroyer
  - S13-class destroyer
- 1913 Type Large Torpedo Boat
  - V25-class destroyer
  - S31-class destroyer
  - G37-class destroyer
  - V43-class destroyer
  - S49-class destroyer
  - V67-class destroyer
  - G85-class destroyer
- 1914 Type Destroyer
  - B 97-class destroyer
  - G101-class destroyer
  - V105-class destroyer
- 1916 Type Destroyer
  - S113-class destroyer
- 1916 Mob Large Torpedo Boat
  - V125-class destroyer
  - S131-class destroyer
  - H145-class destroyer

== Kriegsmarine ==
- Type 23 torpedo boat
- Type 24 torpedo boat
- Zerstörer/Typ 1934
- Zerstörer/Typ 1934 A
- Zerstörer/Typ 1936
- Zerstörer/Typ 1936 A
- Zerstörer/Typ 1936 A (Mob)
- Zerstörer/Typ 1936 B

== Post war Bundesmarine ==
- Type 101 Hamburg class
- Type 103 Lütjens class
