= German destroyer Schleswig-Holstein =

Hamburg-class destroyer

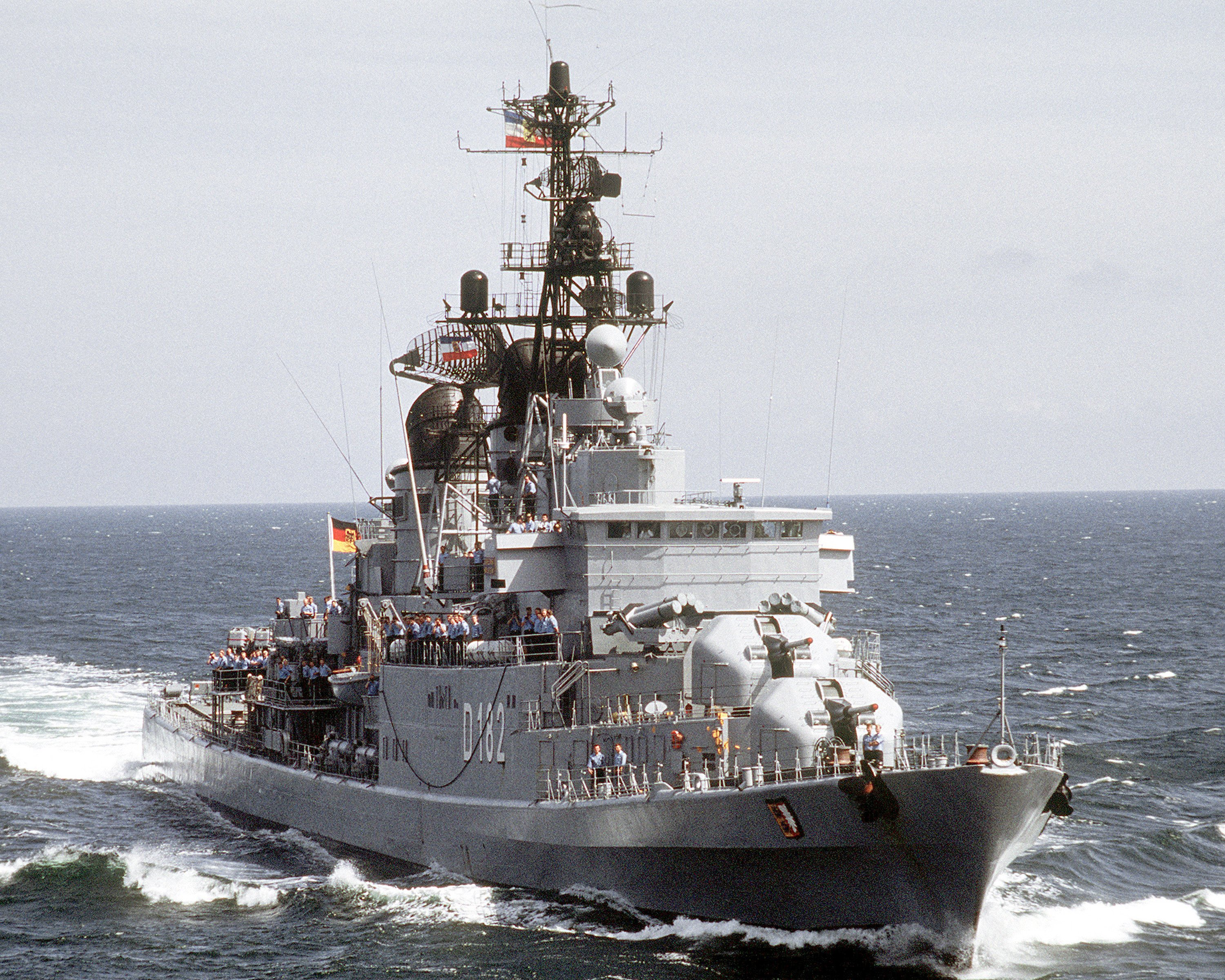
- Schleswig-Holstein underway during BALTOPS on 1 June 1992.

History

Germany
- Name: Schleswig-Holstein
- Namesake: Schleswig-Holstein
- Builder: H. C. Stülcken Sohn, Hamburg
- Laid down: 20 August 1959
- Launched: 20 August 1960
- Commissioned: 12 October 1964
- Decommissioned: 15 December 1994
- Identification: Pennant number: D182; Callsign: DRAB
- Fate: Scrapped in 1998

General characteristics
- Class & type: Hamburg-class destroyer
- Displacement: 4,050 tonnes
- Length: 133.7 m (438 ft 8 in)
- Beam: 13.4 m (44 ft 0 in)
- Draft: 4.8 m (15 ft 9 in)
- Propulsion: 4 × Wahodag boilers, 2 steam turbines, 72,000 shp
- Speed: 35 knots (65 km/h); 37 knots (69 km/h) only D182
- Range: 3,400 nautical miles (6,300 km) at 18 knots (33 km/h)
- Complement: 284
- Sensors & processing systems: 3 × HSA fire-control radars; Sonar 1BV2
- Armament: 3 × DCN 100 mm/L55 guns; 4 × twin 40 mm/L70 guns, Breda Mod 64; 2 × twin MM38 Exocet launcher; 2 × quadruple Bofors 375 mm anti-submarine rocket launchers; 2 × depth charge ramps, 10 depth charges; 4 × 533 mm torpedo tubes; up to 90 naval mines Mk 17; 2 × 20 barreled chaff

Schleswig-Holstein (D182) was the second ship of the Hamburg-class destroyer of the German Navy.

== Background ==
The Type 101 Hamburg class was the only class of destroyers built during post-war Germany. They were specifically designed to operate in the Baltic Sea, where armament and speed is more important than seaworthiness. They were named after Bundesländer (states of Germany) of West Germany.

The German shipyard Stülcken was contracted to design and build the ships. Stülcken was rather inexperienced with naval shipbuilding, but got the order, since the shipyards traditionally building warships for the German navies like Blohm + Voss, Howaldtswerke or Lürssen were all occupied constructing commercial vessels.

== Construction and career ==
Schleswig-Holstein was laid down on 20 August 1959 and launched on 20 August 1960 in Hamburg. She was commissioned on 12 October 1964 and decommissioned on 15 December 1994. Finally towed to Belgium and scrapped in 1998.

== Gallery ==
Schleswig-Holstein Gallery

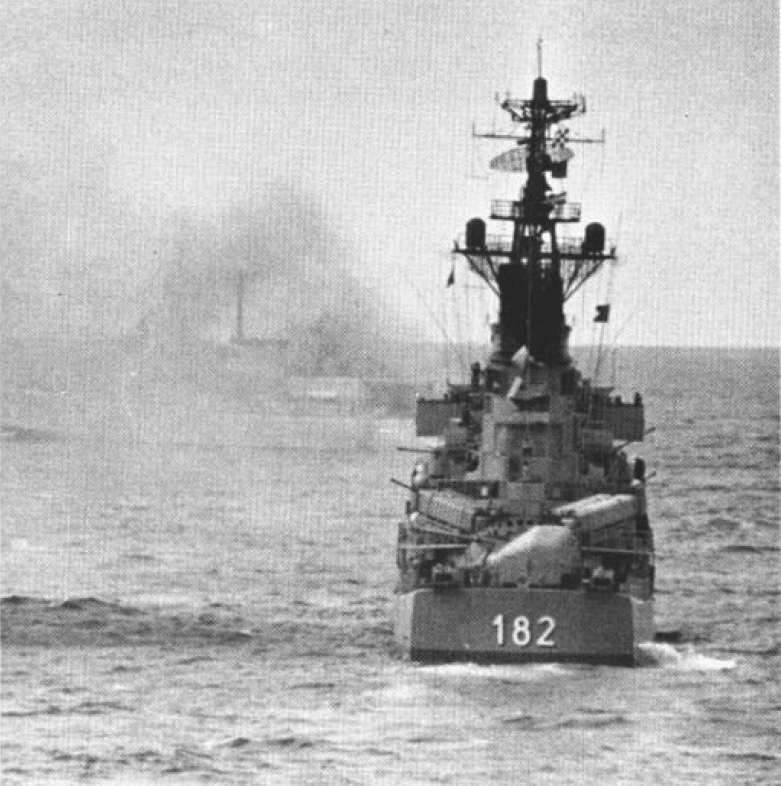
Schleswig-Holstein firing during gunnery exercise in 1984

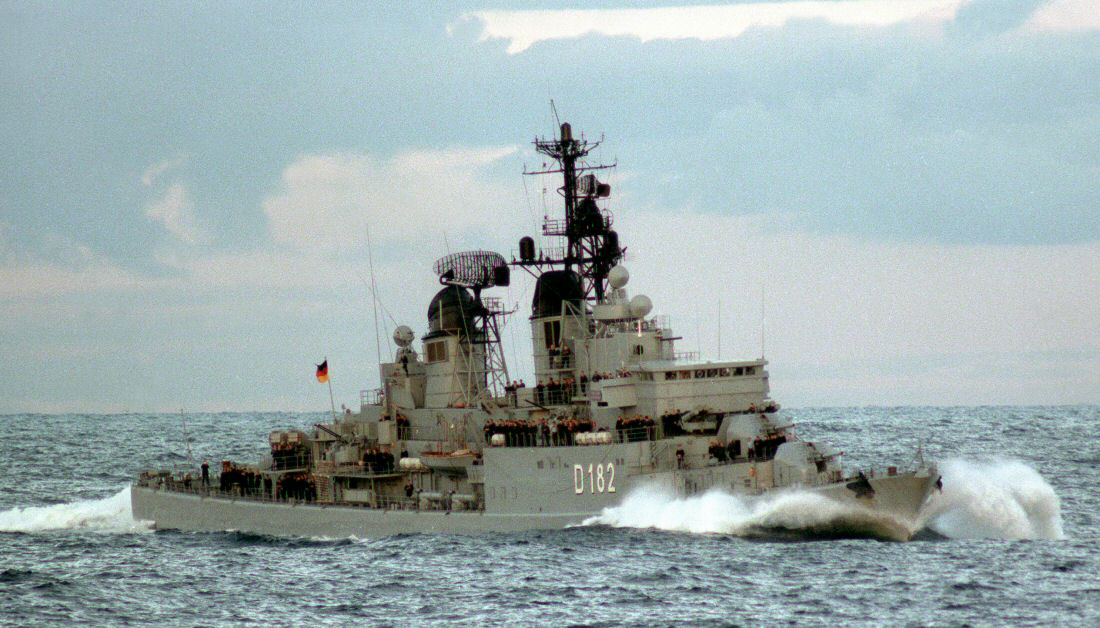
Schleswig-Holstein alongside USS Iowa on 1 August 1986.

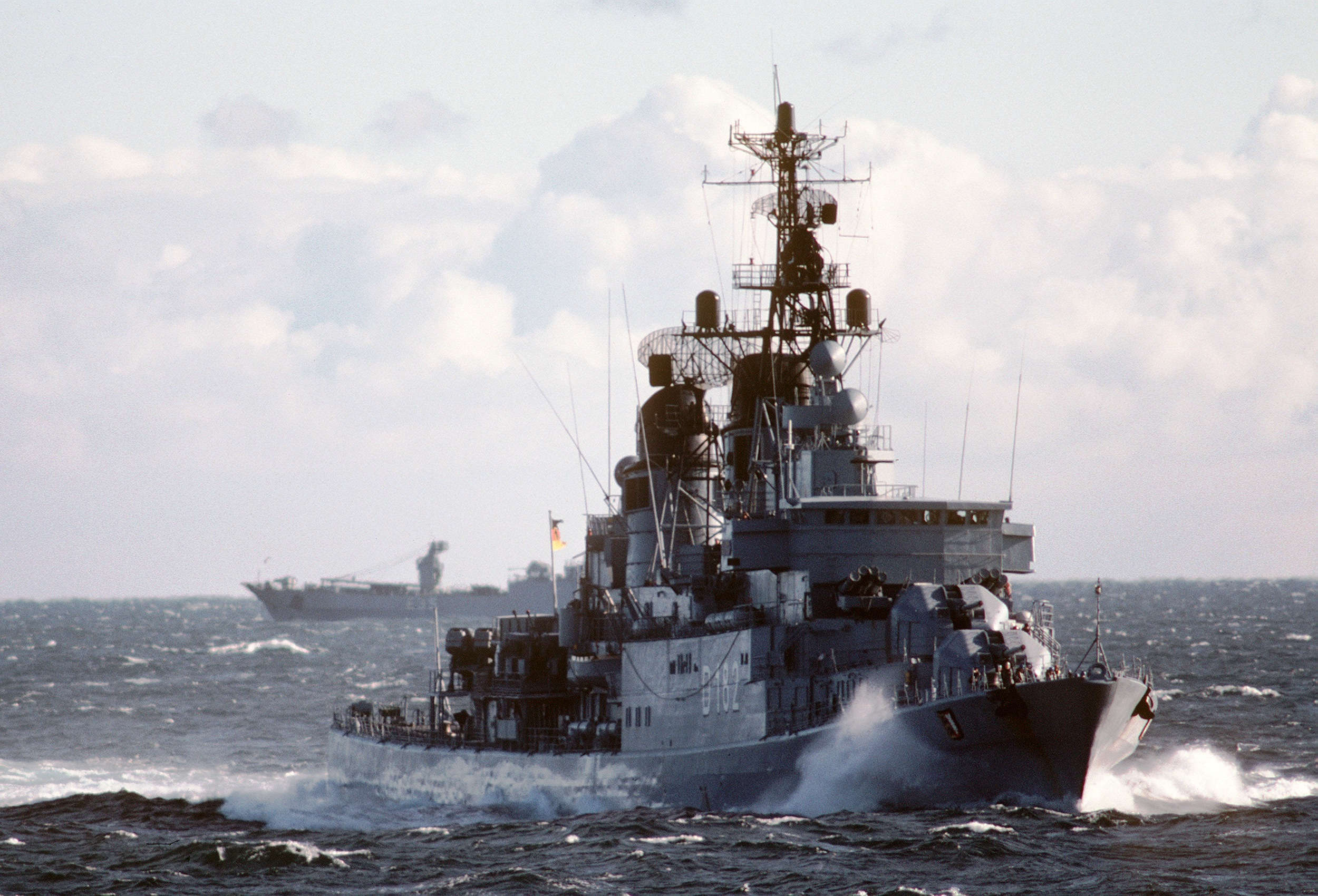
Schleswig-Holstein on 1 August 1986.

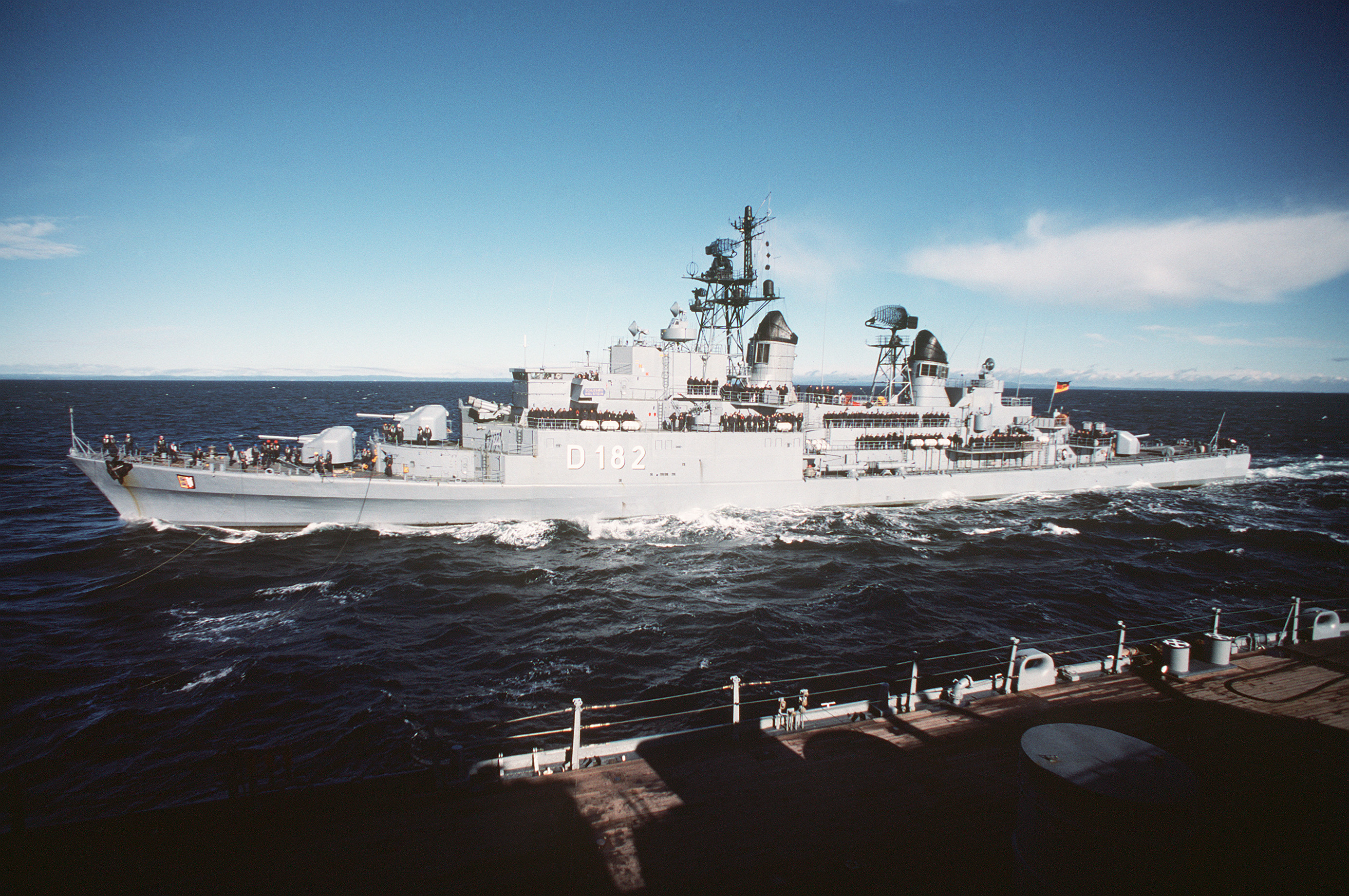
Schleswig-Holstein alongside USS Iowa on 1 August 1986.

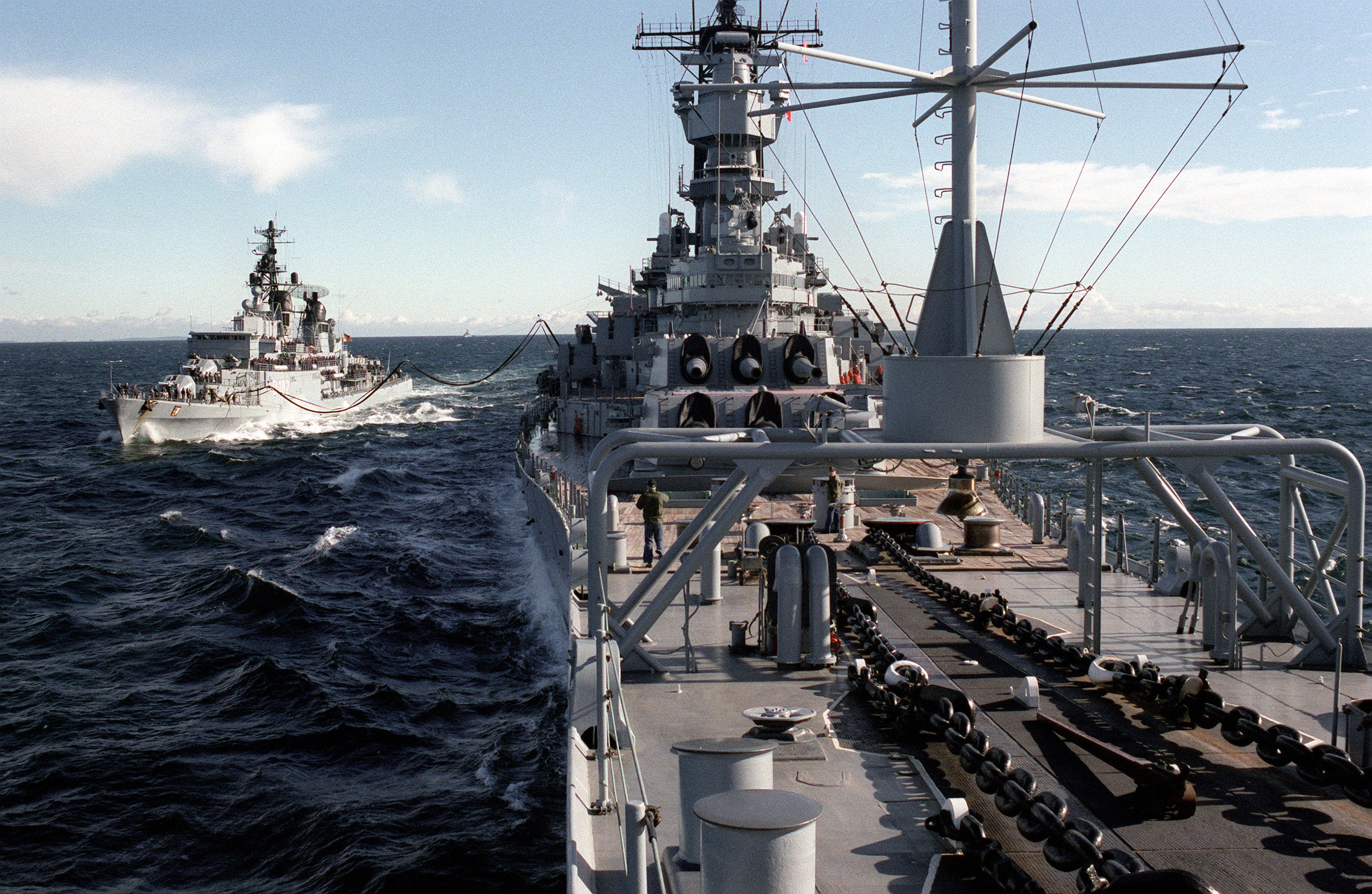
Schleswig-Holstein alongside USS Iowa on 1 August 1986.

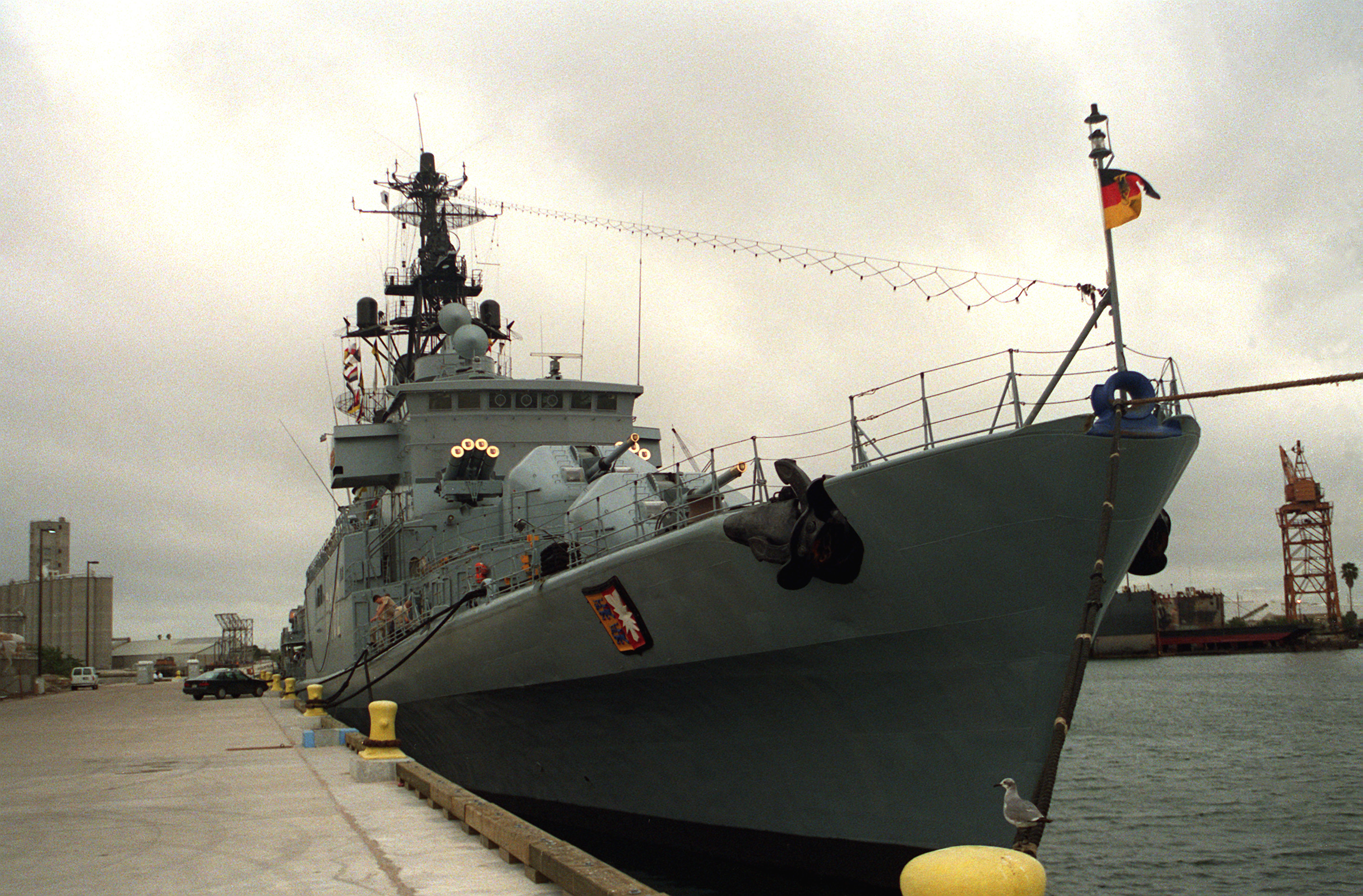
Schleswig-Holstein at Tampa Bay, Florida on 19 February 1994.

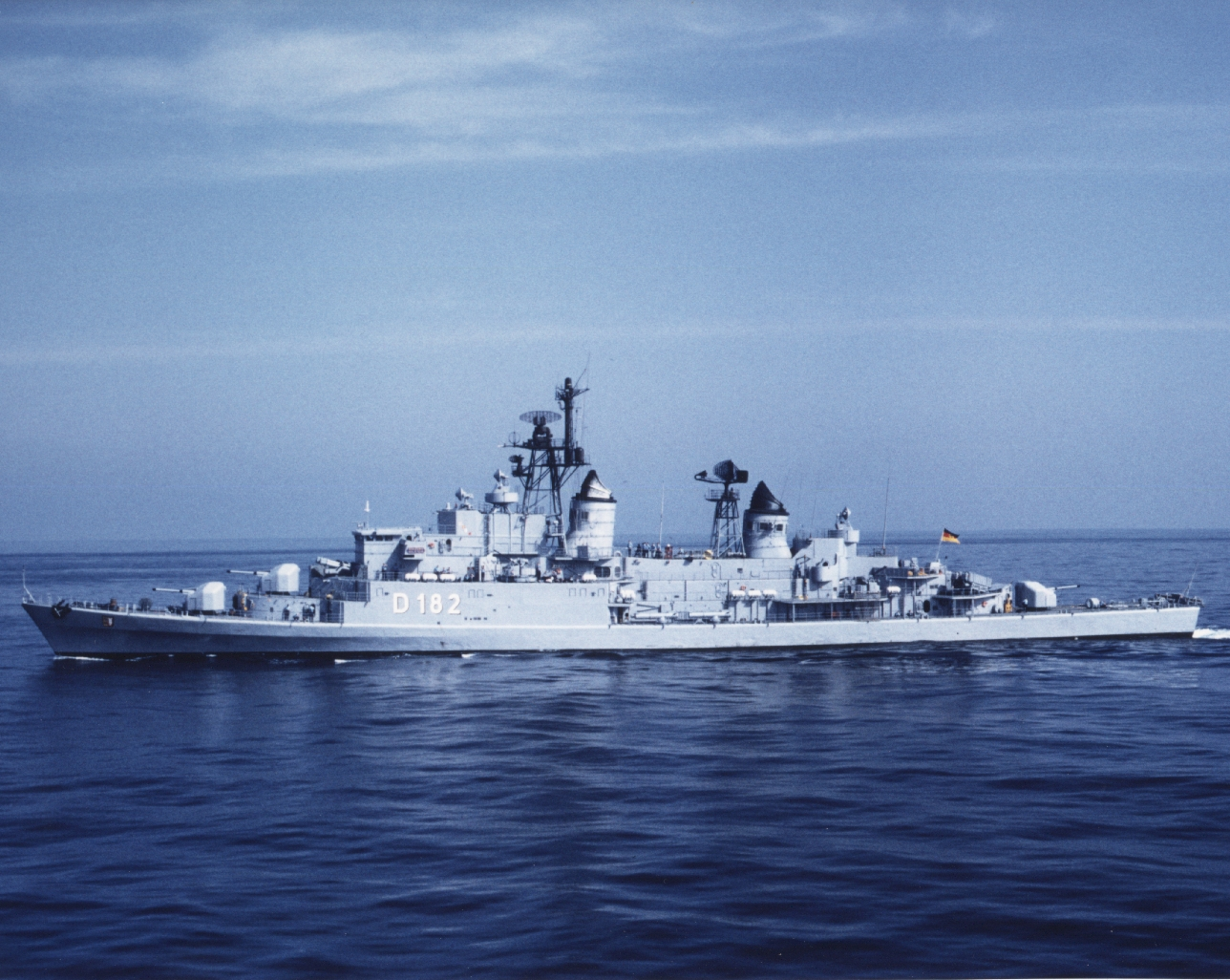
Schleswig-Holstein underway date unknown.
