= Geoff Dyson =

English footballer

Personal information
- Date of birth: 1923
- Place of birth: Linthwaite, England
- Date of death: April 1989 (aged 66)
- Place of death: Huddersfield, West Yorkshire, England
- Position: Inside left

Senior career*
Years	Team	Apps	(Gls)
- Huddersfield Town
1947–1948	Bradford City	1	(0)
1948–1949	Accrington Stanley	20	(1)
Total		21	(1)
- * Club domestic league appearances and goals

Geoff Dyson (16 March 1923 - April 1989) was an English professional footballer who played as an inside left.

== Career ==
Born Linthwaite, Dyson played for Huddersfield Town, Bradford City and Accrington Stanley.

For Bradford City he made 1 appearance in the Football League.

For Accrington Stanley he made 20 appearances in the Football League, scoring 1 goal.

== Sources ==
- Frost, Terry (1988). Bradford City A Complete Record 1903-1988. Breedon Books Sport. ISBN 0-907969-38-0.
