= Dyson, Louisiana =

- Former place
- Location within Louisiana Location within the United States
- Coordinates: 30°59′50″N 90°14′47″W
- Country: United States
- State: Louisiana
- Parish: Washington
- Elevation: 325 ft (99 m)
- Time zone: UTC-6 (Central (CST))
  - Summer (DST): UTC-5 (CDT)
- Area code: 985
- GNIS feature ID: 559732

Dyson was an unincorporated community in Washington Parish, Louisiana, United States. The community is located 7 miles (11.27 kilometres) NW of Franklinton, Louisiana.
