= Hamburg-class destroyer =

Class of ships

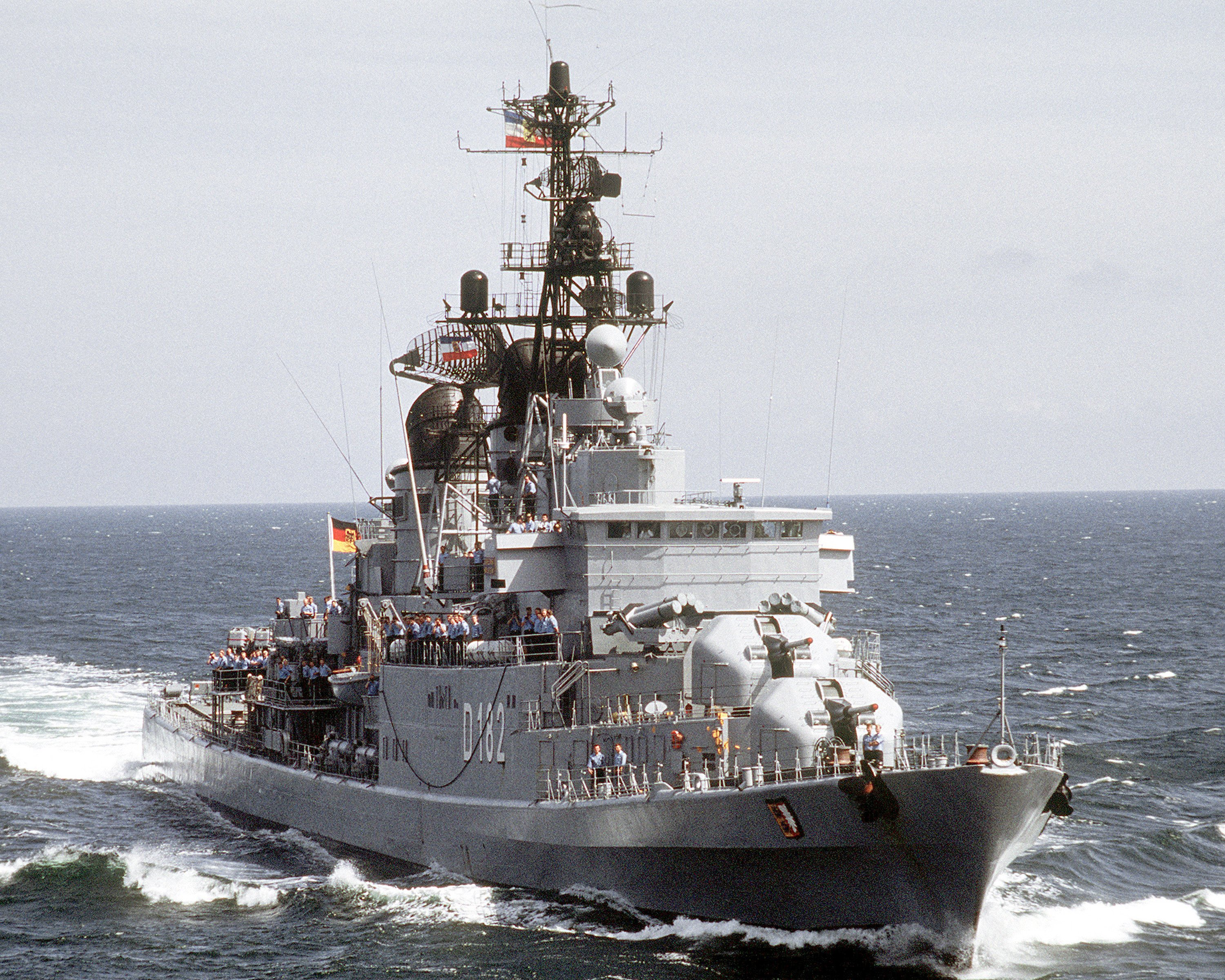
- Schleswig-Holstein (D-182)

Class overview
- Name: Type 101 Hamburg
- Builders: Stülcken-Werft
- Operators: German Navy
- Succeeded by: Brandenburg class
- Cost: DM134 million per ship
- Built: 1959–1963
- In commission: 1964–1994
- Completed: 4
- Retired: 4

General characteristics
- Class & type: Type 101A
- Displacement: 4,050 tonnes
- Length: 133.7 m (438 ft 8 in)
- Beam: 13.4 m (44 ft 0 in)
- Draft: 4.8 m (15 ft 9 in)
- Propulsion: 4 × Wahodag boilers, 2 steam turbines, 72,000 shp
- Speed: 35 knots (65 km/h); 37 knots (69 km/h) only D182
- Range: 3,400 nautical miles (6,300 km) at 18 knots (33 km/h)
- Complement: 284
- Sensors & processing systems: 3 × HSA fire-control radars; Sonar 1BV2
- Armament: 3 × DCN 100 mm/L55 guns; 4 × twin 40 mm/L70 guns, Breda Mod 64; 2 × twin MM38 Exocet launcher; 2 × quadruple Bofors 375 mm anti-submarine rocket launchers; 2 × depth charge ramps, 10 depth charges; 4 × 533 mm torpedo tubes; up to 90 naval mines Mk 17; 2 × 20 barreled chaff

The Type 101 Hamburg class was the only class of destroyers built during post-war Germany. They were specifically designed to operate in the Baltic Sea, where armament and speed is more important than seaworthiness. They were named after Bundesländer. The Hamburg class destroyers were replaced by the Brandenburg class frigates.

== Design ==
The German shipyard Stülcken was contracted to design and build the ships. Stülcken was rather inexperienced with naval shipbuilding, but got the order, since the shipyards traditionally building warships for the German navies like Blohm + Voss, Howaldtswerke or Lürssen were all occupied constructing commercial vessels (no naval ship had been built in Germany since World War II).

Originally, they had only barreled weapons, but from 1976 to 1978 they were upgraded with guided missiles to increase their effectiveness against modern surface warships and were re designated Type 101A. One 100 mm gun was replaced by two Exocet missile launchers, the Bofors were replaced by Breda 40 mm, and the torpedo tubes were removed. Modifications were also made to the operations center, radar and bridge.

The design of the Hamburg class has been criticized for many of the same failures of the Kriegsmarine destroyers: too top-heavy and bad sea-keeping capabilities. This is in part due to the low freeboard on the hull. They were replaced up from 1994 by the Brandenburg class frigates (F123).

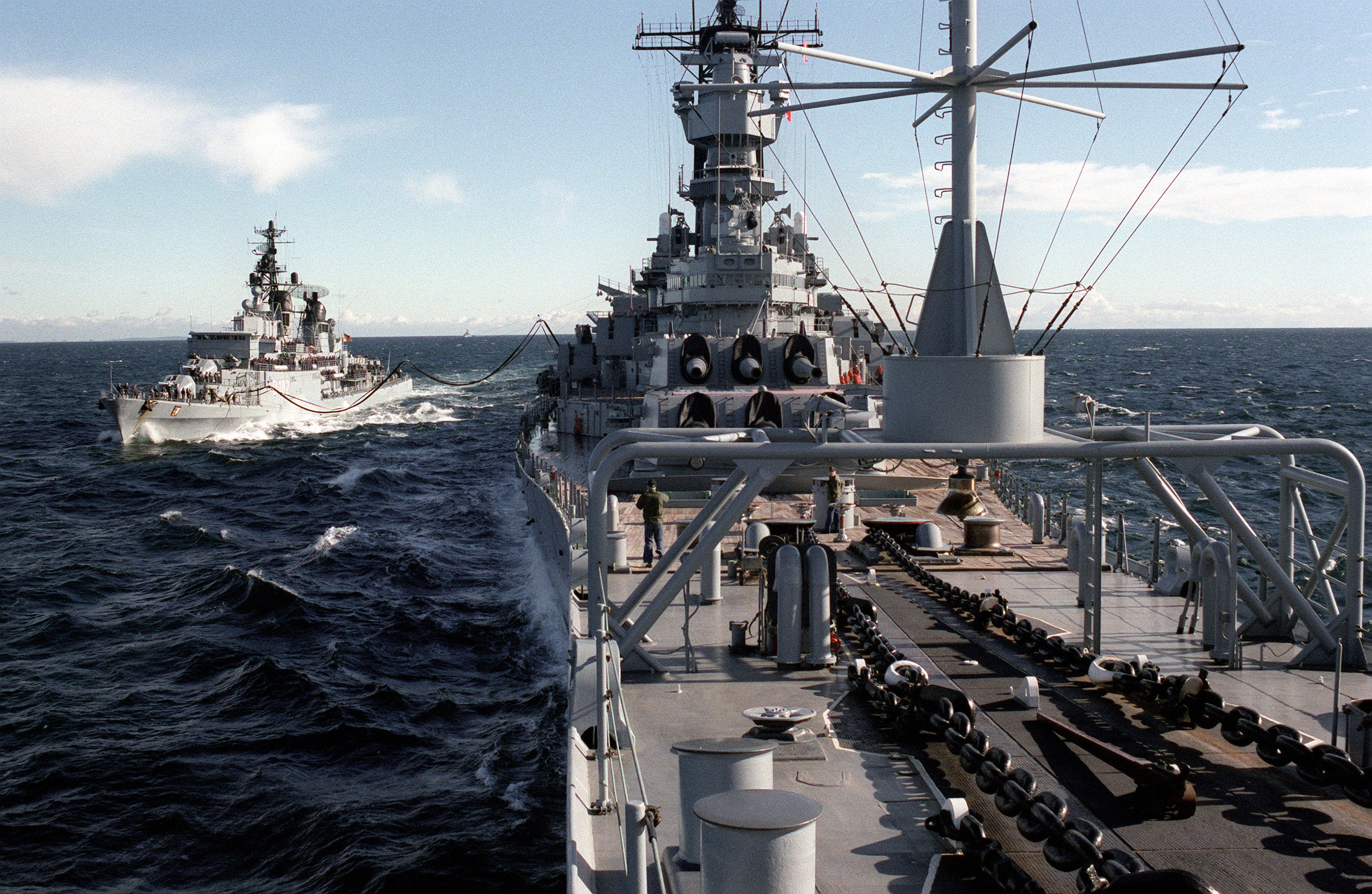
Schleswig Holstein (D-182) being refueled by USS Iowa (BB-61)

== Ships ==
Pennant	Name	Builder	Laid down	Launched	Commissioned	Decommissioned
D181	Hamburg	Stülcken-Werft, Hamburg	29 January 1959	26 March 1960	23 March 1964	24 February 1994
D182	Schleswig-Holstein	Stülcken-Werft, Hamburg	20 August 1959	20 August 1960	12 October 1964	15 December 1994
D183	Bayern	Stülcken-Werft, Hamburg	15 February 1961	14 August 1962	6 July 1965	16 December 1993
D184	Hessen	Stülcken-Werft, Hamburg	5 February 1961	4 May 1963	8 October 1968	29 March 1990

All ships were built by Stülcken and were based in Wilhelmshaven as the 2. Zerstörergeschwader (second destroyer squadron) of the Bundesmarine/Deutsche Marine (German Navy).

== See also ==
- List of destroyers of Germany

Equivalent destroyers of the same era

- Daring class
- Akizuki class
- Friesland class
- Halland class
- Impetuoso class
- Forrest Sherman class
- Kotlin class
- T 47 class

== Citations ==
=== Bibliography ===
- Gardiner, Robert; Chumbley, Stephen; Budzbon, Przemysław, eds. (1995). Conway's All the World's Fighting Ships 1947–1995. Annapolis: Naval Institute Press. ISBN 1-55750-132-7.
- Gerhard Koop/Siegfried Breyer: Die Schiffe, Fahrzeuge und Flugzeuge der deutschen Marine 1956 bis heute. Bernard & Graefe Verlag, München 1996, ISBN 3-7637-5950-6
