= List of German Federal Navy ships =

The list of German Federal Navy ships includes all ships commissioned into service with the Bundesmarine, the German navy which served West Germany during the Cold War from its foundation in 1956 through the unification of Germany in 1990, after which it was renamed German Navy (Deutsche Marine) in 1995. Dates listed are—with some exceptions—the years a given vessel was in commission.

See also the list of naval ships of Germany for naval ships throughout Germany's history.

== Surface combatants ==
- Destroyers
  - Type 119 — Fletcher class
    - D170 Z1 (the former USS Anthony (DD-515) (1959–72)
    - D171 Z2 (the former USS Ringgold (DD-500) (1959–81)
    - D172 Z3 (the former USS Wadsworth (DD-516) (1959–80)
    - D178 Z4 (the former USS Claxton (DD-571) (1959–81)
    - D179 Z5 (the former USS Dyson (DD-572) (1960–82)
    - D180 Z6 (the former USS Charles Ausburne (DD-570) (1960–67)
  - Type 101 — Hamburg-class destroyer
    - D181 Hamburg (1964–94)
    - D182 Schleswig-Holstein (1964–94)
    - D183 Bayern (1965–93)
    - D184 Hessen (1968–90)
  - Type 103 — Lütjens-class destroyer
    - D185 Lütjens (1969–2003)
    - D186 Mölders (1969–2003)
    - D187 Rommel (1970–1998)
- Frigates
  - Hunt-class destroyers, classified as training frigates
    - Brommy (the former HMS Eggesford. Bought in 1950. Decommissioned in 1965)
    - Gneisenau (the former HMS Oakley) bought in 1958. Decommissioned in 1966)
    - Raule (the former HMS Albrighton. Bought in 1959. Decommissioned in 1967)
  - Type 138 (former Royal Navy modified Black Swan-class sloops)
    - F213 Scharnhorst (the former HMS Mermaid) (1959–68)
    - F214 Hipper (the former HMS Actaeon) (1959–67)
    - F215 Graf Spee (the former HMS Flamingo) (1959–67)
    - F216 Scheer (the former HMS Hart) (1959–71)
  - Type 120 Köln class
    - F220 Köln (1961–82)
    - F221 Emden (1961–83)
    - F222 Augsburg (1962–88)
    - F223 Karlsruhe (1962–84)
    - F224 Lübeck (1963–88)
    - F225 Braunschweig (1964–89)
  - Type 122 (Bremen-class frigate)
    - F207 Bremen (1982–2014)
    - F208 Niedersachsen (1982–2015)
    - F209 Rheinland-Pfalz (1983–2013)
    - F210 Emden (1983–2013)
    - F211 Köln (1983–2012)
    - F212 Karlsruhe (1984–2017)
    - F213 Augsburg (1989–2019)
    - F214 Lübeck (1990–2022)

== Amphibious warfare ==
- Landing ships
  - Type 550 (Krokodil-class landing ships)
    - L750 Krokodil (former USS LSM-537) 1958–1976
    - L751 Eidechse (former USS LSM-491) 1958–1976
    - L752 Salamander (former USS LSM5-53) 1958–1970
    - L753 Viper (former USS LSM-558) 1958–1970
  - Type 551 (Otter-class landing ships)
    - L754 Otter (former USS Smyrna River (ex USS LSMR-532)) 1958–1971
    - L755 Natter (former USS Thames River (ex USS LSMR-534)) 1958–1971
  - LST-1-class tank landing ship
    - ex-LST-987 (former USS Millard County) 1961–1964
    - ex-LST-1041 (former USS Montgomery County) 1961–1964
- Landing craft
  - Type 520 Butt-class landing craft
    - L760 Flunder
    - L761 Karpfen
    - L762 Lachs
    - L763 Plötze
    - L764 Rochen
    - L765 Schlei
    - L766 Stör
    - L767 Tümmler
    - L768 Wels
    - L769 Zander
    - L788 Butt
    - L789 Brasse
    - L790 Barbe
    - L791 Delphin
    - L792 Dorsch
    - L793 Felchen
    - L794 Forelle
    - L795 Inger
    - L796 Makrele
    - L797 Muräne
    - L798 Renke
    - L799 Salm
  - LCM-1-class landing craft
    - 28 craft: LCM 1–28
  - LCA-1-class landing craft
    - 10 craft: LCA 1–10
  - LCU-1-class landing craft
    - LCU 1 (ex-L7981; former USS LCU-779/USS LSU-779/USS LCT-779) 1958–1968

== Small Surface Combatants ==
- Submarine chaser
  - Type 179 (Le Fougueux class submarine chaser)
    - UW12 (former USS P1618 1957–1970
- Corvettes
  - Type 420 Thetis class corvette
    - P6052 Thetis 1960–91
    - P6053 Hermes 1960–92
    - P6054 Najade 1961–91
    - P6055 Triton 1961–92
    - P6056 Theseus 1962–92
  - Hans Burkner class corvette
    - A1449 Hans Burkner 1963–??
- Fast attack craft
  - Type 140/141 (Jaguar class fast attack craft/Seeadler class fast attack craft)
    - P6058 Iltis (S 2) 1957–1978
    - P6059 Jaguar (S 1) 1957–1976
    - P6060 Leopard (S 5) 1958–1975
    - P6061 Luchs (S 4) 1958–1975
    - P6062 Wolf (S 3) 1958–1975
    - P6063 Tiger (S 23) 1958–1976
    - P6064 Panther (S 24) 1958–1978
    - P6065 Löwe (S 12) 1959–1975
    - P6066 Fuchs (S 13) 1959–1978
    - P6067 Marder (S 14) 1959–1975
    - P6068 Seeadler (S 6) 1958–1977
    - P6069 Albatros (S 7) 1959–1977
    - P6070 Kondor (S 8) 1959–1977
    - P6071 Greif (S 9) 1959–1976
    - P6072 Falke (S 10) 1959–1976
    - P6073 Geier (S 11) 1959–1976
    - P6074 Bussard (S 25) 1959–1976
    - P6075 Habicht (S 26) 1959–1977
    - P6076 Sperber (S 27) 1959–1976
    - P6077 Kormoran (S 28) 1959–1977
    - P6082 Weihe (S 15) 1959–1973
    - P6083 Kranich (S 16) 1959–1974
    - P6084 Alk (S 29) 1960–1976
    - P6085 Storch (S 17) 1960–1975
    - P6086 Pelikan (S 30) 1960–1975
    - P6087 Häher (S 18) 1960–1976
    - P6088 Elster (S 19) 1960–1978
    - P6089 Reiher (S 20) 1960–1976
    - P6090 Pinguin (S 22) 1961–1975
    - P6091 Dommel (S 21) 1961–1978
  - Type 142 (Zobel class fast attack craft)
    - P6092 Zobel (S 31) 1961–1982
    - P6093 Wiesel (S 32) 1962–1984
    - P6094 Dachs (S 33) 1962–1983
    - P6095 Hermelin (S 38) 1962–1983
    - P6096 Nerz (S 34) 1963–1982
    - P6097 Puma (S 39) 1962–1981
    - P6098 Gepard (S 35) 1963–1982
    - P6099 Hyäne (S 40) 1963–1984
    - P6100 Frettchen (S 36) 1963–1983
    - P6101 Ozelot (S 37) 1963–1984
  - Type 149 (Silbermöwe class fast attack craft)
    - P6052 Silbermöwe (ex-Silver Gull) 1956–1968
    - P6053 Sturmmöwe (ex-Storm Gull ) 1956–1968
    - P6054 Wildschwan (ex-Wild Swan) 1956–1968
    - P6055 Eismöwe (ex-S 1) 1956–1968
    - P6056 Raubmöwe (ex-S 2) 1956–1968
    - P6057 Seeschwalbe 1957–1974
  - Former Kriegsmarine S-boat fast attack craft
    - UW10 (former Kriegsmarine S 130) 1957–1993
    - UW11 (former Kriegsmarine S 208 1957–1964
    - S116 (Kriegsmarine name retained) 1957–1965
  - Type 152 Hugin class fast attack craft (Nasty type, from Norway)
    - P6191 Hugin 1960–1964
    - P6192 Munin 1960–1964
  - Type 153 fast attack craft (Vosper type, from Britain)
    - P6193 Pfeil 1962–1967
    - P6194 Strahl 1962–1967
  - Type 143 (Albatros class fast attack craft)
    - P6111 Albatros (S 61) 1974–
    - P6112 Falke (S 62) 1974–
    - P6113 Geier (S 63) 1974–
    - P6114 Bussard (S 64) 1975–
    - P6115 Sperber (S 65) 1974–
    - P6116 Greif (S 66) 1975–
    - P6117 Kondor (S 67) 1975–
    - P6118 Seeadler (S 68) 1976–
    - P6119 Habicht (S 69) 1975–
    - P6120 Kormoran (S 70) 1976–
  - Type 143A (Gepard class fast attack craft)
    - P6121 Gepard (S 71) 1982–
    - P6122 Puma (S 72) 1982–
    - P6123 Hermelin (S 73) 1983–
    - P6124 Nerz (S 74) 1982–
    - P6125 Zobel (S 75) 1982–
    - P6126 Frettchen (S 76) 1983–
    - P6127 Dachs (S 77) 1983–
    - P6128 Ozelot (S 78) 1984–
    - P6129 Wiesel (S 79) 1984–
    - P6130 Hyäne (S 80) 1984–
- Motor launches
  - Former Kriegsmarine R-boat small minesweepers
    - Y870 UW 4 (Former Kriegsmarine R 101) 1956–1981
    - W47 UW 5 (Former Kriegsmarine R 150) 1956–1979
    - W48 UW 6 (Former Kriegsmarine R 408) 1956–1977
    - W52 OT 1 (i) (Former Kriegsmarine R 406) 1956–1960
    - W61 AT 1 (i) (Former Kriegsmarine R 266) 1957–1968
    - W62 AT 2 (Former Kriegsmarine R 407) 1957–1963
    - W-- OT 1 (ii) (Converted motor minesweeper Jupiter (M1065), former Kriegsmarine R 137)
    - W-- AT 1 (ii) (Converted motor minesweeper Regulus (M1055), former Kriegsmarine R 142)
- Patrol trawlers
  - Type 139 patrol trawler (Former British Isles class trawler)
    - A50 Eider (Former HMS Flint (T287)
    - A51 Trave (Former HMS Dochet (T286)
  - KW1 class patrol trawler (Former Kriegsmarine KFK type patrol trawler)
    - W1 KW 1 (Former Kriegsmarine V 1441) 1956–1968
    - Y828 KW 2 (Former Kriegsmarine M 3253) 1956–1975
    - Y829 KW 3 (Former Kriegsmarine K 566 1956–??
    - W4 KW 4 (Former Kriegsmarine ??) 1956–1964
    - W5 KW 5 (Former Kriegsmarine ??) 1956–1964
    - Y836 KW 6 (Former Kriegsmarine ??) 1956–1976
    - W7 KW 7 (Former Kriegsmarine ??) 1956–1967
    - Y831 KW 8 (Former Kriegsmarine ??) 1956–1975
    - W9 KW 9 (Former Kriegsmarine ??) 1956–1964
    - W10 KW 10 (Former Kriegsmarine ??) 1956–1964
- Patrol craft
  - KW11 class patrol craft (Former Frontier Guard craft)
    - KW 11 (ex-P 1) 1956–??
    - KW 12 (ex-P 2) 1956–??
    - KW 13 (ex-P 3) 1956–??
    - KW 14 (ex-P 4) 1956–??
  - Type 369 KW15 class patrol craft (Former Labor Service Unit craft)
    - Y827 KW 15 (ex-USN 54) 1956–??
    - Y830 KW 16 (ex-USN 55) 1956–??
    - Y845 KW 17 (ex-USN 56) 1956–??
    - Y832 KW 18 (ex-USN 57) 1956–??
    - Y833 KW 19 (ex-USN 58) 1956–1981
    - Y846 KW 20 (ex-USN 59) 1956–??
  - BG1 class patrol craft (former Type 369 KW 15 class patrol craft)
    - BG1 ---- (ex-KW 15)
    - BG2 ---- (ex-KW 16)
    - BG3 ---- (ex-KW 17)
    - BG4 ---- (ex-KW 19)
  - BG11 type Neustadt class patrol craft
    - BG11 Neustadt 1969–
    - BG12 Bad Bramstadt 1969–
    - BG13 Uelzen 1969–
    - BG14 Duderstadt 1969–
    - BG15 Eschwege 1969–
    - BG16 Alsfeld 1970–
    - BG17 Bayreuth 1970–
    - BG18 Rosenheim 1970–
- Air-sea rescue boats
  - Type 909 FL5 class air sea rescue boat
    - FL5 -- (ex-KW 11, former P 1)
    - FL6 -- (ex-KW 12, former P 2)
    - FL7 -- (ex-KW 13, former P 3)
    - FL8 -- (ex-KW 14, former P 4)

== Subsurface combatants ==
- Submarines
  - Type 240 submarine
    - S170 Hai (former Kriegsmarine U2365) 1956–1966
    - S171 Hecht (former Kriegsmarine U2367) 1957–1969
  - Type 241 submarine
    - Y888 Wilhelm Bauer (former Kriegsmarine U2549) 1960–1983
  - Type 201 submarine
    - S180 U-1 1962–1966
    - S181 U-2 1962–1963
    - S182 U-3 1963–1967
  - Type 202 submarine (experimental)
    - S172 Hans Techel 1965–1966
    - S173 Friedrich Schürer 1965–1966
  - Type 205 submarine
    - S183 U-4 1962–1974
    - S184 U-5 1962–1974
    - S185 U-6 1963–1974
    - S186 U-7 1963–1974
    - S187 U-8 1963–1974
    - S188 U-9 1966–1993
    - S189 U-10 1967–1993
    - S190 U-11 1968–??
    - S191 U-12 1968–??
    - S180 U-1 1967–1991
    - S181 U-2 1966–1992
  - Type 206 submarine—later upgraded to Type 206A submarine
    - S192 U-13 1973–
    - S193 U-14 1973–
    - S194 U-15 1973–
    - S195 U-16 1973–
    - S196 U-17 1973–
    - S197 U-18 1973–
    - S198 U-19 1973–
    - S199 U-20 1973–
    - S170 U-21 1974–
    - S171 U-22 1974–
    - S172 U-23 1974–
    - S173 U-24 1974–
    - S174 U-25 1974–
    - S175 U-26 1974–
    - S176 U-27 1974–
    - S177 U-28 1975–
    - S178 U-29 1974–
    - S179 U-30 1975–

== Mine warfare ==
- Minelayers
  - Type 370 (Bamberg class minelayer)
    - N120 Bochum (former USS Rice County (LST 1089)) 1961–1976
    - N121 Bottrup (former USS Saline County (LST 1101)) 1961–1976
    - A1403 Bamberg (former USS Greer County (LST 799)) 1961–1970
  - Type 762 (Sachsenwald class mine transport/minelayer)
    - A1437 Sachsenwald 1967–??
    - A1438 Steigerwald 1967–??
- Ocean Minesweepers
  - Type 319 (Former Kriegsmarine M class minesweeper)
    - F207 Biene (Former Kriegsmarine M 205, Type 1935) 1956–1974
    - F208 Bremse (Former Kriegsmarine M 253, Type 1935) 1956–1976
    - F209 Brummer (Former Kriegsmarine M 85, Type 1935) 1956–1974
    - F210 Hummel (Former Kriegsmarine M 81, Type 1935) 1956–1976
    - F211 Wespe (Former Kriegsmarine M 24, Type 1935) 1956–1973
    - M187 Seehund (Former Kriegsmarine M 388, Type 1940) 1956–1973
    - M188 Seeigel (Former Kriegsmarine M 460, Type 1940) 1956–1973
    - M189 Seelöwe (Former Kriegsmarine M 441, Type 1940) 1956–1969
    - M190 Seepferd (Former Kriegsmarine M 294, Type 1940) 1956–1966
    - M191 Seeschlange (Former Kriegsmarine M611, Type 1943) 1956–1967
    - M192 Seestern (Former Kriegsmarine M 278, Type 1940) 1956–1966
- Coastal Minesweepers
  - Type 320 (Lindau class minesweeper)
    - Later upgraded to Type 331B minehunter:
      - M1070 Göttingen 1958–
      - M1071 Koblenz 1958–
      - M1072 Lindau 1958–
      - M1074 Tübingen 1958–
      - M1075 Wetzlar 1958–
      - M1077 Weilheim 1959–
      - M1078 Cuxhaven 1959–
      - M1080 Marburg 1959–
      - M1085 Minden 1960–
      - M1087 Völklingen 1960–
    - Later upgraded to Type 351 control ship (for 'Troika' minesweeping drones):
      - M1073 Schleswig 1958–
      - M1076 Paderborn 1958–
      - M1079 Düren 1959–
      - M1081 Konstanz 1959–
      - M1082 Wolfsburg 1959–
      - M1083 Ulm 1959–
    - Later upgraded to Type 331A minehunter:
      - M1084 Flensburg 1959–
      - M1086 Fulda 1960–
  - Type 321 (Vegesack class minesweeper)
    - M1250 Vegesack 1959–1975
    - M1251 Hameln 1959–1975
    - M1252 Detmold 1960–1975
    - M1253 Worms 1960–1975
    - M1254 Siegen 1960–1975
    - M1255 Passau 1960–1978
- Inshore minesweepers
  - Type 340 (Krebs class minesweeper)
    - M1050 Mira 1960–1978
    - M1051 Castor 1962–1990
    - M1052 Krebs 1959–1976
    - M1053 Orion 1961–1979
    - M1054 Pollux 1961–1992
    - M1055 Sirius 1961–1990
    - M1056 Rigel 1962–1990
    - M1057 Regulus 1962–1990
    - M1058 Mars 1960–1992
    - M1059 Spica 1960–1992
  - Type 341 (Schütze class minesweeper)
    - M1060 Skorpion 1963–??
    - M1061 Stier 1958–??
    - M1062 Schütze 1958–??
    - M1063 Waage 1963–??
    - M1064 Deneb 1961–??
    - M1065 Jupiter 1961–??
    - M1066 Pegasus 1962–1974
    - M1067 Altair 1961–??
    - M1068 Algol 1963–1973
    - M1069 Wega 1962–??
    - M1090 Perseus 1960–??
    - M1091 Steinbock 1958–??
    - M1092 Pluto 1960–??
    - M1093 Neptun 1960–??
    - M1094 Widder 1959–??
    - M1095 Herkules 1960–??
    - M1096 Fische 1959–??
    - M1097 Gemma 1959–??
    - M1098 Capella 1960–1976
    - M1099 Uranus 1960–1973
  - Type 390 (Holnis class minesweeper)
    - M---- Holnis 1966–??
  - Type 391 (Niobe class minesweeper)
    - M---- Niobe 1957–??
  - Type 392 (Hansa class minesweepers)
    - M---- Hansa 1958–??
  - Type 393 (Ariadne class minesweeper)
    - M2650 Ariadne 1960–??
    - M2651 Freya 1960–??
    - M2652 Vineta 1960–??
    - M2653 Hertha 1961–??
    - M2654 Nymphe 1962–??
    - M2655 Nixe 1962–??
    - M2656 Amazone 1963–??
    - M2657 Gazelle 1963–??
  - Type 394 (Frauenlob-class minesweeper)
    - M2658 Frauenlob 1966–2002
    - M2659 Nautilus 1966–1994
    - M2660 Gefion 1967–2002
    - M2661 Medusa 1967–2001
    - M2662 Undine 1967–2001
    - M2663 Minerva 1967–1995
    - M2664 Diana 1967–1995
    - M2665 Loreley 1968–2002
    - M2666 Atlantis 1968–1995
    - M2667 Acheron 1969–1995
- Motor minesweepers
  - Type 359 motor minesweeper (Former Kriegsmarine R-boat motor minesweeper—Most later redesignated as Type 730 accommodation minesweepers)
    - M1050 Capella (Former Kriegsmarine R 133) 1956–1972
    - M1051 Castor (Former Kriegsmarine R 138) 1956–1958
    - M1052 Mars (Former Kriegsmarine R 136) 1956–1967
    - M1053 Orion (Former Kriegsmarine R 132) 1956–1968
    - M1054 Pollux (Former Kriegsmarine R 140) 1956–1970
    - M1055 Regulus (Former Kriegsmarine R 142) 1956–1968
    - M1056 Rigel (Former Kriegsmarine R 135) 1956–1967
    - M1057 Saturn (Former Kriegsmarine R 146) 1956–1972
    - M1058 Sirius (Former Kriegsmarine R 144) 1956–1971
    - M1059 Spica (Former Kriegsmarine R 247) 1956–1970
    - M1060 Aldebaran (Former Kriegsmarine R 91) 1956–1972
    - M1061 Algol (Former Kriegsmarine R 99) 1956–1970
    - M1062 Arkturus (Former Kriegsmarine R 128) 1956–1968
    - M1063 Altair (Former Kriegsmarine R 76) 1956–1970
    - M1064 Deneb (Former Kriegsmarine R 127) 1956–1968
    - M1065 Jupiter (Former Kriegsmarine R 137) 1956–1969
    - M1066 Merkur (Former Kriegsmarine R 134) 1956–1970
    - M1067 Pegasus (Former Kriegsmarine R 68) 1956–1970
    - M1068 Skorpion (Former Kriegsmarine R 120) 1956–1974
    - M1069 Wega (Former Kriegsmarine R 67) 1956–1966

== Auxiliary ships ==
- Tenders
  - Type 401 (Rhein class fast attack tender craft tender)
    - A58 Rhein 1960–??
    - A61 Elbe 1960–??
    - A62 Weser 1960–1976
    - A63 Main 1960–??
    - A64 Ruhr 1960–1976
    - A66 Neckar 1961–??
    - A68 Werra 1963–??
    - A69 Donau 1961–??
  - Type 402 (Mosel class fast minesweeper tender)
    - A54 Isar 1962–1982
    - A65 Saar 1961–1991
    - A67 Mosel 1961–??
  - Type 403 (Lahn class submarine tender)
    - A55 Lahn 1962–??
    - A56 Lech 1962–??
- Repair ships
  - Type 726 (Odin class repair ship)
    - A512 Odin (former USS Ulysses (ARB 9/LST 967)) 1962–??
    - A513 Wotan (former USS Diomedes (ARB 11/LST 1119)) 1962–??
- Replenishment ships/oilers
  - Type 701 (Lüneburg class replenishment ship)
    - A1411 Lüneburg
    - A1412 Coburg
    - A1413 Freiburg
    - A1414 Glücksburg
    - A1415 Saarburg
    - A1416 Nienburg
    - A1417 Offenburg
    - A1418 Meersburg
  - Type 706 (Schwarzwald class replenishment ship)
    - A1400 Schwarzwald
- Training ships
  - Type 440 (Deutschland class training ship)
    - German naval ship Deutschland (A59)
  - Gorch Fock type
    - Gorch Fock sail training vessel
