= List of ship launches in 1959 =

The list of ship launches in 1959 includes a chronological list of all ships launched in 1959.

Date	Ship	Class / type	Builder	Location	Country	Notes
9 January	Halibut	Unique nuclear-powered submarine	Mare Island Naval Shipyard	Vallejo, California	United States	
18 January	Anita Thyssen	Nordseewerke Bulk Carrier 17.100 tdw	Nordseewerke	Emden	West Germany	For Seereederei Frigga, Hamburg
22 January	Bankura	Cargo ship	Harland & Wolff	Belfast	United Kingdom	For British India Steam Navigation Company.
27 January	Ashbank	Cargo ship	Harland & Wolff	Belfast	United Kingdom	For Bank Line.
31 January	Parramatta	River-class destroyer escort	Cockatoo Island Dockyard	Sydney, New South Wales	Australia	
January	Sabtow One	Tank barge	Alabama Drydock and Shipbuilding Company	Mobile, Alabama	United States	For Sabine Towing.
11 February	Cuxhaven	Lindau-class minesweeper	Burmester shipyard	Bremen-Burg	West Germany	For German Navy
14 February	Y.C.484	Lighter	J. Bolson & Son Ltd.	Poole	United Kingdom	For Admiralty.
17 February	Haleakala	Nitro-class ammunition ship	Bethlehem Sparrows Point Shipyard	Sparrows Point, Maryland	United States	
26 February	Ulster Star	Refrigerated cargo ship	Harland & Wolff	Belfast	United Kingdom	For Blue Star Line.
9 March	Ashanti	Tribal-class frigate	Yarrow Shipbuilders	Glasgow, Scotland	United Kingdom	
19 March	Bore	Ferry	Oskarshamns varv	Oskarshamn	Sweden	For Steamship Company Bore
19 March	Essiflora	Nordseewerke Bulk Carrier 17.100 tdw	Nordseewerke	Emden	West Germany	For Björn Ruud-Pedersen
21 March	Emden	Köln-class (Type 140) frigate			West Germany	
26 March	Rüm Hart	ferry	Husumer Schiffswerft GmbH	Husum	West Germany	For Wyker Dampfschiffs-Reederei Amrum GmbH
6 April	Lincoln	Salisbury-class frigate	Fairfield Shipbuilding	Glasgow, Scotland	United Kingdom	
9 April	Somers Isle	Cargo ship	Harland & Wolff	Belfast	United Kingdom	For Pacific Steam Navigation Company.
13 April	Elk	Coaster	Brooke Marine Ltd.	Lowestoft	United Kingdom	For British Transport Commission.
22 April	Henry B. Wilson	Charles F. Adams-class destroyer	Defoe Shipbuilding Company	Bay City, Michigan	United States	
23 April	Cheshire	Cargo ship	Cammell Laird	Birkenhead	United Kingdom	For Bibby Line
23 April	Towers	Charles F. Adams-class destroyer	Todd Pacific Shipyards	Seattle, Washington	United States	
April	F.T.C. 120	Barge	Alabama Drydock and Shipbuilding Company	Mobile, Alabama	United States	For Findlay Towing Co. Inc.
April	F.T.C. 121	Barge	Alabama Drydock and Shipbuilding Company	Mobile, Alabama	United States	For Findlay Towing Co. Inc.
7 May	Queensgarth	Bulk carrier	Blyth Dry Docks & Shipbuilding Co. Ltd	Blyth, Northumberland	United Kingdom	For St. Denis Shipping Co. Ltd.
16 May	Blueback	Barbel-class submarine	Ingalls Shipbuilding	Pascagoula, Mississippi	United States	
21 May	Eskfield	Tanker	Harland & Wolff	Belfast	United Kingdom	For Hunting & Sons.
22 May	British Power	Tanker	Harland & Wolff	Belfast	United Kingdom	For British Tanker Company.
23 May	Preble	Farragut-class destroyer	Bath Iron Works	Bath, Maine	United States	
25 May	Moose	Coaster	Brooke Marine Ltd.	Lowestoft	United Kingdom	For British Transport Commission.
25 May	Oyashio	Oyashio-class submarine			Japan	
5 June	Pinebank	Cargo ship	Harland & Wolff	Belfast	United Kingdom	For Bank Line.
9 June	George Washington	George Washington-class submarine	Electric Boat	Groton, Connecticut	United States	
18 June	Harusame	Murasame-class destroyer			Japan	
20 June	Daphné	Daphné-class submarine	Dubigeon	Nantes	France	For French Navy
22 June	Matanzas	Cargo ship	Atlantic Shipbuilding Co. Ltd	Newport	United Kingdom	For Banco Cubano del Comercio Exterio.
22 June	Y.C.483	Lighter	J. Bolson & Son Ltd.	Poole	United Kingdom	For Admiralty.
23 June	Royston Grange	Refrigerated cargo liner	Hawthorn Leslie	Hebburn	United Kingdom	For Houlder Line
23 June	Windsor Castle	Ocean liner	Cammell Laird	Birkenhead	United Kingdom	For Union-Castle Line
24 June	Teruzuki	Akizuki-class destroyer			Japan	
26 June	Akizuki	Akizuki-class destroyer			Japan	
26 June	Constable	Refrigerated cargo ship	Brooke Marine Ltd.	Lowestoft	United Kingdom	For Lamport and Holt Line Ltd.
1 July	L 830	Type Mannheim 59 ferry	Schiffs- und Maschinenbau AG Mannheim	Mannheim	West Germany	For Flusspioniere
7 July	Amazon	Passenger ship	Harland & Wolff	Belfast	United Kingdom	For Royal Mail Line.
8 July	York	Coaster	Harland & Wolff	Belfast	United Kingdom	For Associated Humber Lines.
9 July	Macdonough	Farragut-class destroyer	Fore River Shipyard	Quincy, Massachusetts	United States	
14 July	Long Beach	Long Beach-class cruiser	Fore River Shipyard	Quincy, Massachusetts	United States	
18 July	Foch	Clemenceau-class aircraft carrier			France	First launching
21 July	Savannah	Nuclear-powered cargo ship	New York Shipbuilding	Camden, New Jersey	United States	For United States Maritime Administration
23 July	Hamilton Trader	Tanker	Blyth Dry Docks & Shipbuilding Co. Ltd	Blyth, Northumberland	United Kingdom	For Trader Line Ltd.
28 July	Lynde McCormick	Charles F. Adams-class destroyer	Defoe Shipbuilding Company	Bay City, Michigan	United States	
8 August	Takanami	Ayanami-class destroyer			Japan	
15 August	Augsburg	Köln-class (Type 140) frigate	Stülcken & Sohn	Hamburg	West Germany	
17 August	Parsons	Forrest Sherman-class destroyer	Ingalls Shipbuilding	Pascagoula, Mississippi	United States	
19 August	Taranaki	Modified Rothesay-class frigate	J. Samuel White & Co.	Cowes, Isle of Wight	New Zealand	
August	BMC-142	Barge	Alabama Drydock and Shipbuilding Company	Mobile, Alabama	United States	For BMC-145 Inc.
8 September	Charles F. Adams	Charles F. Adams-class destroyer	Bath Iron Works	Bath, Maine	United States	
22 September	Patrick Henry	George Washington-class submarine	Electric Boat	Groton, Connecticut	United States	
3 October	Theodore Roosevelt	George Washington-class submarine	Mare Island Naval Shipyard	Vallejo, California	United States	
5 October	Esso Tynemouth	Tanker	J. Bolson & Son Ltd.	Poole	United Kingdom	For Esso Petroleum Co. Ltd.
7 October	Mahan	Farragut-class destroyer	San Francisco Naval Shipyard	San Francisco, California	United States	
20 October	Aragon	Cargo liner	Harland & Wolff	Belfast	United Kingdom	For Royal Mail Lines.
23 October	Bode Thomas	Buoy tender	Brooke Marine Ltd.	Lowestoft	United Kingdom	For Nigerian Ports Authority.
24 October	Karlsruhe	Köln-class (Type 140) frigate			West Germany	
24 October	Esso Brussels	Tanker	Kockums	Malmö	Sweden	For Esso Marine (Belgium) SA
3 November	British Mallard	Tanker	Harland & Wolff	Belfast	United Kingdom	For British Tanker Company.
3 November	Oriana	Ocean liner	Vickers-Armstrongs	Barrow-in-Furness	United Kingdom	For Orient Line
1 December	Monksgarth	Bulk Carrier	Blyth Dry Docks & Shipbuilding Co. Ltd	Blyth, Northumberland	United Kingdom	For St. Denis Shipping Co. Ltd.
15 December	Berwick	Rothesay-class frigate	Harland & Wolff	Belfast	United Kingdom	For Royal Navy.
18 December	Robert E. Lee	George Washington-class submarine	Newport News Shipbuilding	Newport News, Virginia	United States	
29 December	British Gull	Tanker	Harland & Wolff	Belfast	United Kingdom	For British Tanker Company.
29 December	Elmbank	Cargo ship	Harland & Wolff	Belfast	United Kingdom	For Bank Line.
29 December	Scorpion	Skipjack-class submarine	Electric Boat	Groton, Connecticut	United States	
Unknown date	Bangkang	Tank barge	J. Bolson & Son Ltd.	Poole	United Kingdom	For Sociètè Shell du Cambodge.
Unknown Date	Betty	Nordseewerke Bulk Carrier 17.100 tdw	Nordseewerke	Emden	West Germany	For Christian F. Bonnevie
Unknown Date	Harle Riff	Type Mannheim 59 ferry	Schiffs- und Maschinenbau AG Mannheim	Mannheim	West Germany	For Flusspioniere
Unknown date	Kanchadeva	Merchantman	Brooke Marine Ltd.	Lowestoft	United Kingdom	For private owner.
Unknown date	Kreng	Tank barge	J. Bolson & Son Ltd.	Poole	United Kingdom	For Sociètè Shell du Cambodge.
Unknown date	Lies	Tank barge	J. Bolson & Son Ltd.	Poole	United Kingdom	For Sociètè Shell du Cambodge.
Unknown date	Penelope	Survey ship	Aldous Successors Ltd.	Brightlingsea	United Kingdom	For Nigerian Navy.
Unknown date	Pussadeva	Merchantman	Brooke Marine Ltd.	Lowestoft	United Kingdom	For private owner.
Unknown date	R.B. No. 5	Barge	Alabama Drydock and Shipbuilding Company	Mobile, Alabama	United States	For River Barges Inc.
Unknown date	TTC 36	Barge	Alabama Drydock and Shipbuilding Company	Mobile, Alabama	United States	For Tutts Towing Co.
