= List of ship decommissionings in 1988 =

The list of ship decommissionings in 1988 includes a chronological list of all ships decommissioned in 1988.

	Operator	Ship	Flag	Class and type	Fate	Other notes
6 February	Royal Australian Navy	Advance		Attack-class patrol boat	Museum ship	To Australian National Maritime Museum
30 March	German Navy	Augsburg		Köln-class frigate	Wrecked at Hamburg	
17 May	Stena Line	Stena Saga	Sweden	Ferry	Transferred to Lion Ferry	Rebuilt into Lion Queen
25 June	United States Navy	Tullibee		Unique submarine	Decommissioned	Entered the Navy's Nuclear Powered Ship and Submarine Recycling Program on 5 January 1995. On 1 April 1996, the hulk ceased to exist.
26 June	Royal Australian Navy	Bayonet		Attack-class patrol boat	Decommissioned	Scuttled in Bass Strait
7 July	Royal Navy	Diomede		Leander-class frigate	Decommissioned	Sold to Pakistan, renamed PNS Shamsheer
31 August	Royal Navy	Apollo		Leander-class frigate	Decommissioned	Sold to Pakistan, renamed PNS Zulfiqar
13 October	SF Line (Viking Line traffic)	Turella	Finland	Cruiseferry	Sold to Stena Line	Renamed Stena Nordica
1 December	German Navy	Lübeck		Köln-class frigate	Decommissioned	Sold to the Turkish Navy for cannibalization
December	Swansea-Cork Ferries	Celtic Pride	Poland	Ferry	End of charter, returned to Polferries	Renamed Rogalin

== Bibliography ==
- Friedman, Norman (2006). British Destroyers and Frigates, the Second World War and After. Annapolis, Maryland: Naval Institute Press. ISBN 1-86176-137-6.
