= List of ship decommissionings in 1983 =

The list of ship decommissionings in 1983 includes a chronological list of all ships decommissioned in 1983.

	Operator	Ship	Flag	Class and type	Fate	Other notes
28 February	Stena Sessan Line	Prinsessan Birgitta	Sweden	Cruiseferry	Chartered to Sealink	Renamed St Nicholas
25 March	Unknown	World Wide Expo	Denmark	Cruiseferry	End of charter, returned to DFDS Seaways	Renamed Tor Scandinavia
28 March	German Navy	Karlsruhe			Sold to the Turkish Navy	Renamed Gelibolu (D360)
19 May	Polferries	Rogalin	Poland	Ferry	Chartered to Faraskip H/F	Renamed Edda
30 June	German Navy	Emden			Sold to the Turkish Navy	Renamed Gemlik (D361)
27 July	Royal Navy	Dido		Leander-class frigate	Sold to New Zealand	Renamed HMNZS Southland
Date unknown (prior to 29 August)	Karageorgis Line	Wasa Star	Sweden	Cruiseferry	Taken over by Rederi AB Gotland due to breaking of charter agreement by Vaasanlaivat-Vasabåtarna	Sold to Larvik Line, 29 August 1983
12 September	B&I Line	Fennia	Finland	Ferry	End of charter, returned to Svea Line (Finland)	Laid up until 1984
18 September	Faraskip H/F	Edda	Iceland	Ferry	End of charter from Polferries	Renamed Rogalin
29 November	Scandinavian World Cruises	Scandinavia	Bahamas	cruiseferry	Transferred to DFDS Seaways	

== Bibliography ==
- Colledge, J. J.; Warlow, Ben & Bush, Steve (2020). Ships of the Royal Navy: The Complete Record of all Fighting Ships of the Royal Navy from the 15th Century to the Present (5th revised and updated ed.). Barnsley, UK: Seaforth Publishing. ISBN 978-1-5267-9327-0.
