= German frigate Braunschweig =

Köln-class frigate of Bundesmarine

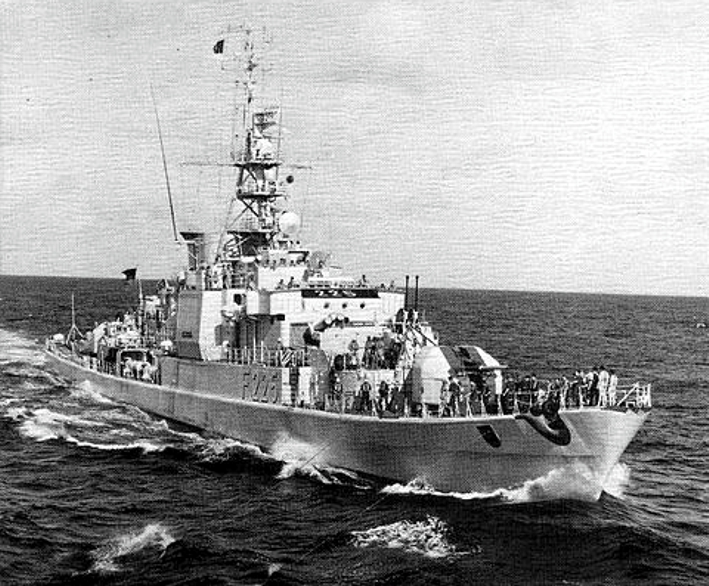
- Braunschweig in 1972

History

Germany
- Name: Braunschweig
- Namesake: Braunschweig
- Builder: H. C. Stülcken Sohn
- Laid down: 28 July 1960
- Launched: 3 February 1962
- Commissioned: 16 June 1964
- Decommissioned: 4 July 1984
- Home port: Wilhelmshaven
- Identification: Pennant number: F225
- Fate: Sold to Turkish Navy
- Badge

Turkey
- Name: Gemlik
- Namesake: Gemlik
- Commissioned: 16 July 1992
- Decommissioned: July 1994
- Identification: Pennant number: D-361
- Fate: Scrapped

General characteristics
- Type: Köln-class frigate
- Displacement: 2090 tons standard; 2750 tons full load
- Length: 105 m (344 ft 6 in) waterline; 109.80 m (360 ft 3 in) overall
- Beam: 11 m (36 ft 1 in)
- Draught: 4.60 m (15 ft 1 in)
- Propulsion: 2 shaft CODAG; 2 Brown Boveri & Cie gas turbines, 8832 kilowatts each (24,000 hp total); 4 MAN 16-cylinder diesel engines, 2208 kilowatts each (12,000hp total)
- Speed: 32 knots (59 km/h; 37 mph)
- Range: 3,450 nautical miles (6,390 km; 3,970 mi) at 12 knots (22 km/h; 14 mph), 900 nautical miles (1,670 km; 1,040 mi) at 30 knots (56 km/h; 35 mph)
- Endurance: Bunker: 360 t
- Complement: 238
- Sensors & processing systems: Navigation radar KH14/9; Target designation radar DA-02; Surface search radar SGR103; Fire control radar M44, M45; Sonar PAE/CWE hull mounted medium frequency sonar
- Armament: 2 × single METL 100 mm guns; 2 × dual Breda 40 mm/L70 guns; 2 × single Bofors 40 mm/L70 guns; 4 × single 533 mm torpedo tubes, 4 × quad 375 mm ASW rockets; depth charges, mine-laying capacity

Braunschweig (F225) is the sixth ship of the Köln-class frigates of the German Navy.

== Design ==
The Type 120 or Köln-class frigates were built as smooth-deckers and had very elegant lines. The very diagonally cut bow and the knuckle ribs in the foredeck made it easy to navigate. The hull and parts of the superstructure were made of shipbuilding steel, other superstructure parts were made of aluminum. Due to the installation of gas turbines, large side air inlets were necessary, which could be closed by lamellas. The stern was designed as a round stern. The large funnel was sloped and skirted. Behind the bridge superstructure stood the tall lattice mast with radar and other antennas. The hull was divided into 13 watertight compartments.

On the forecastle was a 10 cm gun, behind it, set higher, a 4 cm twin gun. Behind it stood two quadruple anti-submarine missile launchers 37.5 cm from Bofors. A 4 cm Bofors single gun on each side of the aft superstructure and another 4 cm double mount at the end of the superstructure. There was a second 10 cm gun on the quarterdeck. In addition, there were two 53.3 cm torpedo tubes behind the front superstructures. They were used to fire Mk-44 torpedoes. Mine rails were laid behind the torpedo tubes and ran to the stern.

== Construction and career ==
Braunschweig was laid down on 28 July 1960 and launched on 3 February 1962 in Stülcken & Sohn, Germany. She was commissioned on 16 June 1964.

She was decommissioned in 1989 and handed over to the Turkish Navy as a spare parts supplier for two sister ships used there (ex-Emden and ex-Karlsruhe). After her sister ship Emden fell victim to a fire as Gemlik, the former Braunschweig was put into service under the name Gemlik for the Turkish Navy in 1992 and continued to do active service for a few years.

== Gallery ==
Braunschweig gallery

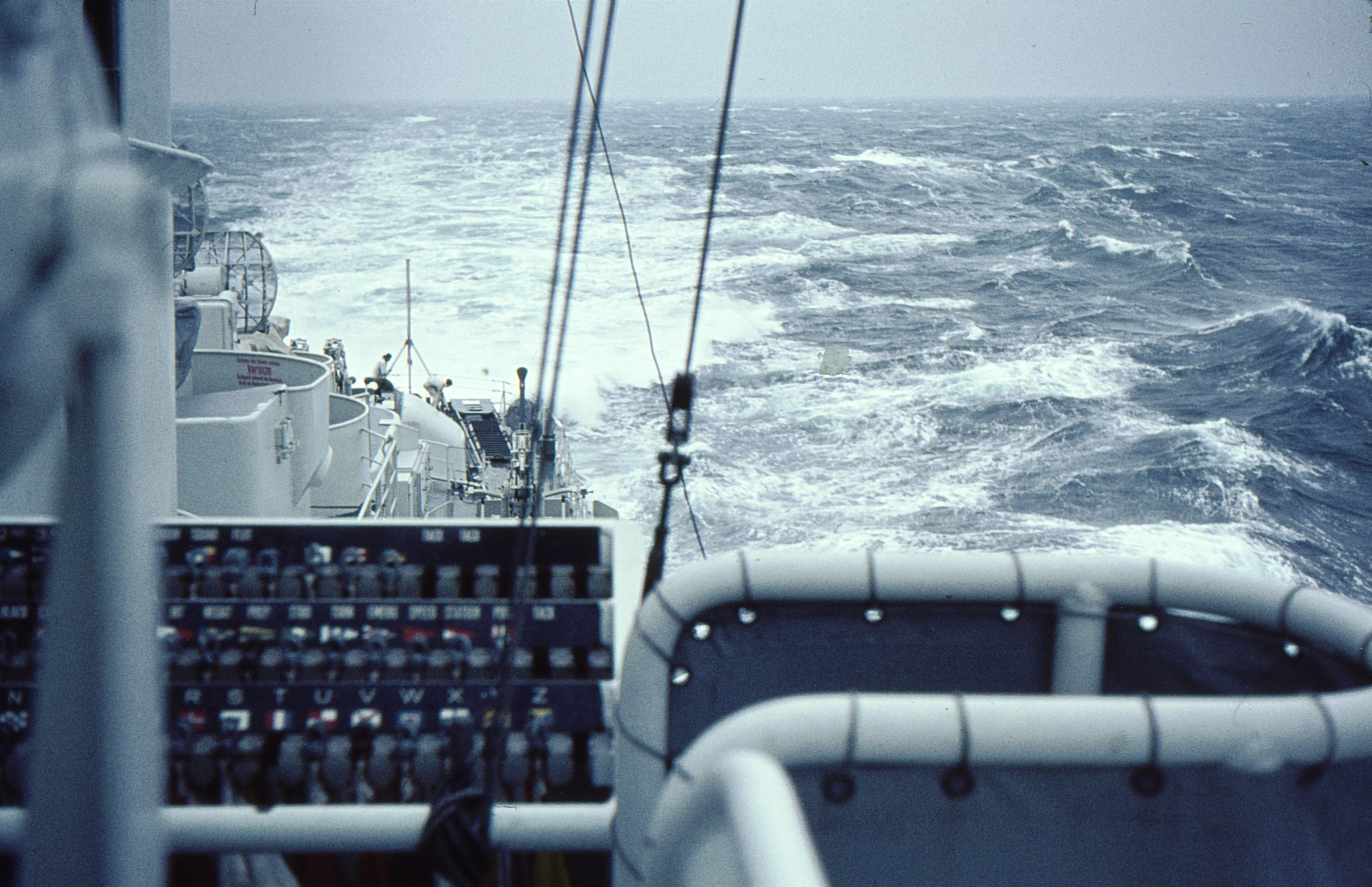
Braunschweig in 1964

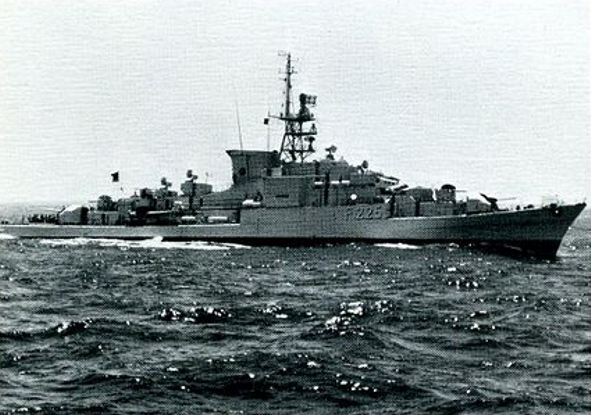
Braunschweig in 1972

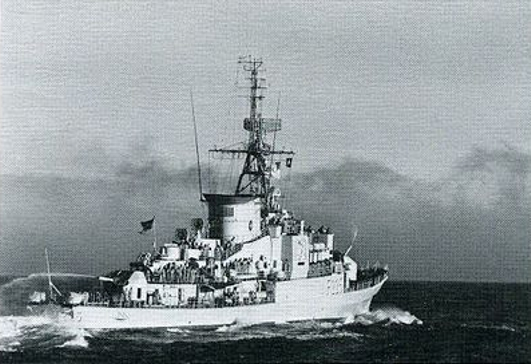
Braunschweig off Lisbon in 1972

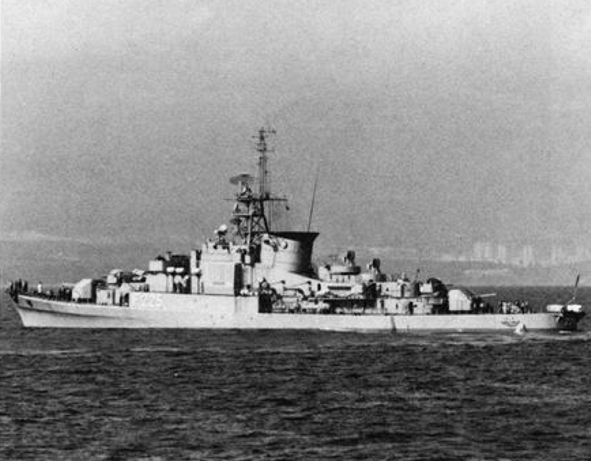
Braunschweig in 1981
