= TCG Gemlik =

TCG Gemlik is the name of the following ships of the Turkish Navy, named for the municipality of Gemlik:

- TCG Gemlik (D 347), ex-USS Lardner (DD-487), a Gleaves-class destroyer acquired in 1949, stricken in 1974, sunk as target in 1982
- TCG Gemlik (D 361), ex-Emden (F221), a Köln-class frigate acquired from Germany in 1983, scrapped in 1994
- TCG Gemlik (F 492), ex-USS Flatley (FFG-21), a Oliver Hazard Perry-class frigate acquired in 1998, in active service
