= USS Edward McDonnell =

US Navy frigate

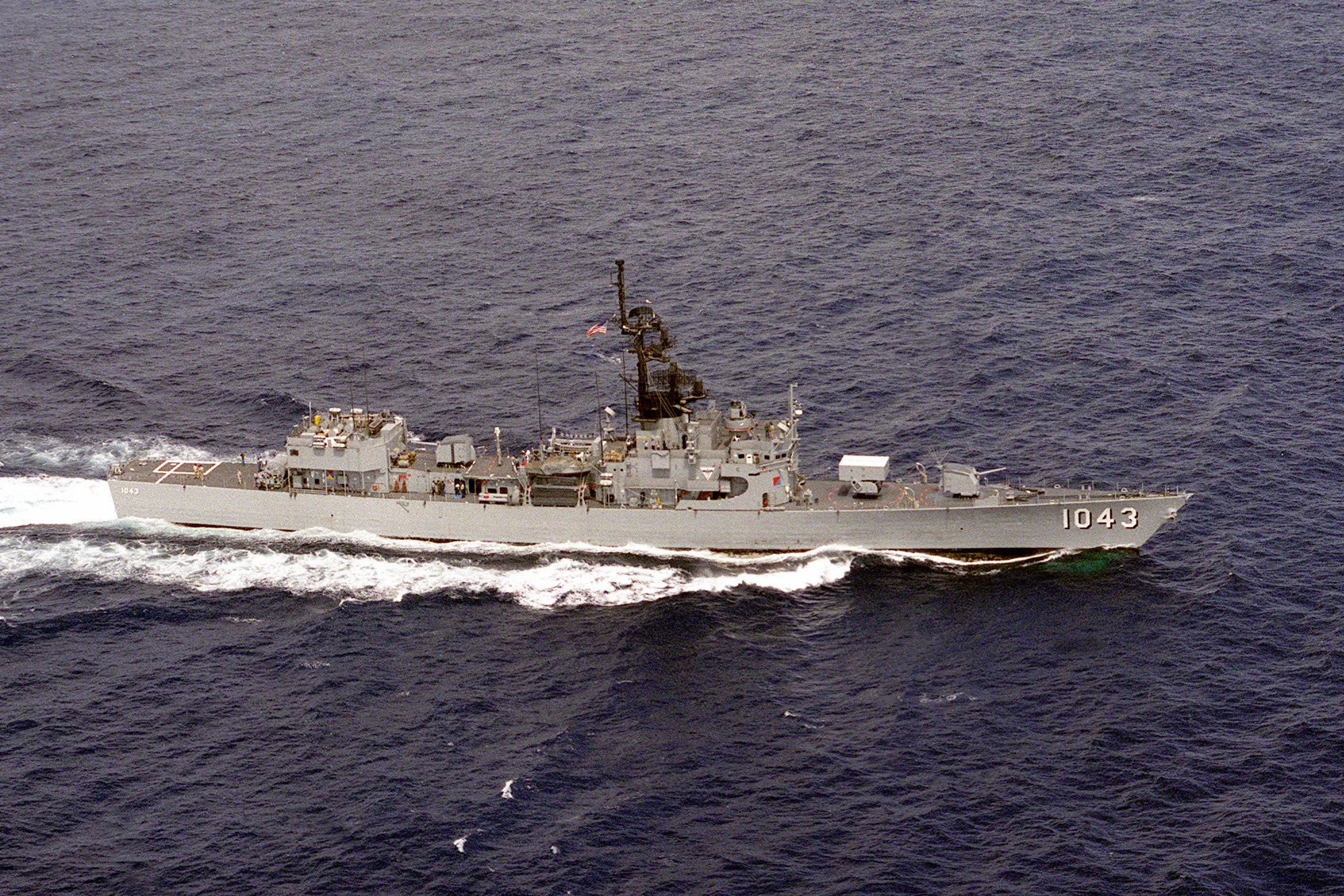

History

United States
- Name: USS Edward McDonnell
- Awarded: 3 January 1962
- Builder: Avondale Shipyard, New Orleans, Louisiana
- Laid down: 1 April 1963
- Launched: January 1964
- Commissioned: 15 February 1965
- Decommissioned: 30 September 1988
- Reclassified: Frigate 30 June 1975*
- Refit: 1968
- Stricken: 15 December 1992
- Identification: DE-1043 (1965); FF-1043 (1975)
- Motto: Deter Through Strength
- Nickname(s): "Eddy Mac"
- Honours and awards: Navy Unit Commendation, CG Meritorious Unit Commendation with star, Navy Expeditionary Medal, National Defense Service Medal, CG Special Operations Service Ribbon with 2 stars
- Fate: Disposed of by scrapping, dismantling, 21 August 2002

General characteristics
- Class & type: Garcia-class frigate; (Formerly destroyer escort)
- Displacement: 2,624 tons (light)
- Length: 414 ft 6 in (126.34 m)
- Beam: 44 ft 1 in (13.44 m)
- Draught: 24 ft 6 in (7.47 m)
- Propulsion: 2 Foster-Wheeler boilers; 1 Westinghouse geared turbine; 35,000 shp (26,000 kW); 1 shaft
- Speed: 27 knots (50 km/h; 31 mph)
- Complement: 16 officers; 231 enlisted
- Armament: 2 × single 5 in (130 mm)/38 cal. Mk 30 guns; 1 × 8-tube ASROC Mk16 launcher (16 missiles); 2 × triple 12.75 in (324 mm) Mk 32 torpedo tubes, Mk 46 torpedoes; 2 × MK 37 torpedo tubes (fixed, stern)
- Aircraft carried: 1 x SH-2F Seasprite LAMPS I

USS Edward McDonnell (FF-1043) was a frigate in the US Navy and the third in its class. Named for Medal of Honor recipient Vice Admiral Edward Orrick McDonnell.

== Service history ==
=== Construction and commissioning ===
The keel for Edward McDonnell was laid at Avondale Shipyard in Westwego, Louisiana on 1 April 1963. She was launched at Avondale in January 1964, and was commissioned at Charleston Naval Shipyard, South Carolina as DE-1043 on 15 February 1965. She completed her fitting out at Norfolk Naval Shipyard, Virginia and became operational as part of the US Navy's Atlantic Fleet Anti-Submarine Warfare Forces on 14 January 1966.

=== Operational history ===
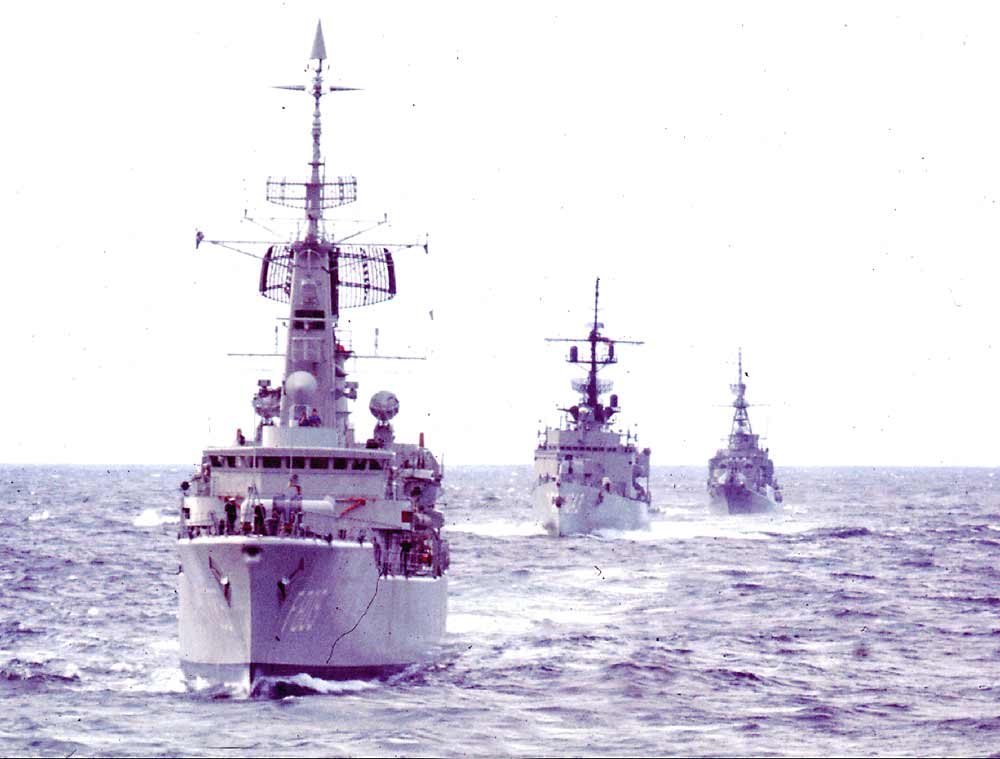
Three NATO frigates entering Lisbon, Portugal, in February 1975: HNLMS Van Nes (lead), USS Edward McDonnell, and the Lübeck.

In May 1966, USS Edward McDonnell was transferred to the Escort Squadron VI (Cortron 6) with its home port at Naval Station Newport, Rhode Island. Throughout 1966 and 1967, Edward McDonnell was assigned to anti submarine operations and exercises in the Atlantic and the Mediterranean.

In February 1968, Edward McDonnell entered Boston Naval Shipyard for a 13-month overhaul. Following her refit, Edward McDonnell undertook a shakedown and training deployment in the Caribbean before returning to Newport in June 1969.

During 1975, Edward McDonnell was assigned to NATO's Standing Naval Force Atlantic (STANAVFORLANT) along with the Royal Netherlands Navy Van Speijk-class frigate Van Nes and the West Germany Navy Köln-class frigate Lübeck.

=== Fate ===
USS Edward McDonnell was decommissioned on 30 September 1988, and struck from the Naval Register on 15 December 1992. She was moored at the Naval Inactive Ship Maintenance Facility in the Philadelphia Naval Shipyard awaiting disposal. She was sold for scrapping on 25 July 1995, and scrapping was completed at PNSY by 21 August 2002. The scrap value of the ship was $842 per ton.
