= TCG Gelibolu =

TCG Gelibolu is a name used three times for ships of the Turkish Navy:

- TCG Gelibolu (D-346) or TCG Gelibolu (D 346), ex USS Buchanan (DD-484)
- TCG Gelibolu (F-493) or TCG Gelibolu (F 493), ex USS Reid (FFG-30)
- TCG Gelibolu (D-360) or TCG Gelibolu (D 360), ex West German Karlsruhe (F 223)
