= German frigate Lübeck (F224) =

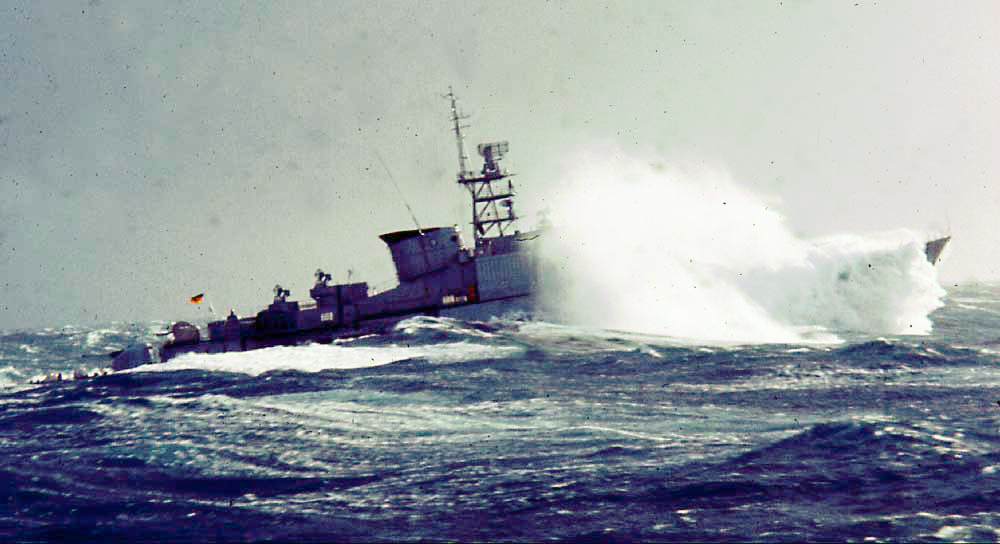
- Lübeck in the Bay of Biscay, 1975

History

Germany
- Name: Lübeck
- Namesake: Lübeck
- Builder: H. C. Stülcken Sohn
- Laid down: 28 October 1959
- Launched: 23 July 1960
- Commissioned: 6 June 1963
- Decommissioned: 1 December 1988
- Out of service: 30 September 1988
- Home port: Wilhelmshaven
- Identification: Pennant number: F224; Code letters: DBSI (Note: until 30 November 1981); DRAO (Note: from 1 December 1981)
- Fate: Sold to Turkey for cannibalization
- Badge

General characteristics
- Class & type: Köln-class frigate
- Displacement: 2,969 long tons (3,017 t)
- Length: 109.8 m (360 ft 3 in)
- Beam: 11 m (36 ft 1 in)
- Draft: 3.5 m (11 ft 6 in)
- Propulsion: CODAG; 2 × gas turbines 8,832 kW (11,844 hp) each; 4 × diesel engines 2,208 kW (2,961 hp) each
- Speed: 34 knots (63 km/h; 39 mph) maximum; 24 knots (44 km/h; 28 mph) cruise on diesel
- Range: 2,700 nmi (5,000 km; 3,100 mi) at 22 knots (41 km/h; 25 mph); 890 nmi (1,650 km) at 29 knots (54 km/h; 33 mph)
- Complement: 210 to 238
- Armament: 2 × 100 mm/55 caliber METL 53 guns; 2 × twin 40 mm / 70 caliber Breda Mod 58 II MDL AA guns; 2 × 40 mm / 70 caliber Bofors Mod 58 AA guns; 4 × 533 mm torpedo tubes with Mark 44 torpedoes; 2 × quad 375 mm ASW rockets; Depth charges; Mines

Lübeck (F224) was a Köln-class frigate which served in the Bundesmarine from 1963 through 1988.

== Design ==
The Type 120 or Köln-class frigates were built as smooth-deckers and had very elegant lines. The very diagonally cut bow and the knuckle ribs in the foredeck made it easy to navigate. The hull and parts of the superstructure were made of shipbuilding steel, other superstructure parts were made of aluminum. Due to the installation of gas turbines, large side air inlets were necessary, which could be closed by lamellas. The stern was designed as a round stern. The large funnel was sloped and skirted. Behind the bridge superstructure stood the tall lattice mast with radar and other antennas. The hull was divided into 13 watertight compartments.

On the forecastle was a 10 cm gun, behind it, set higher, a 4 cm twin gun. Behind it stood two quadruple anti-submarine missile launchers 37.5 cm from Bofors. A 4 cm Bofors single gun on each side of the aft superstructure and another 4 cm double mount at the end of the superstructure. There was a second 10 cm gun on the quarterdeck. In addition, there were two 53.3 cm torpedo tubes behind the front superstructures. They were used to fire Mk-44 torpedoes. Mine rails were laid behind the torpedo tubes and ran to the stern.

== Construction and career ==
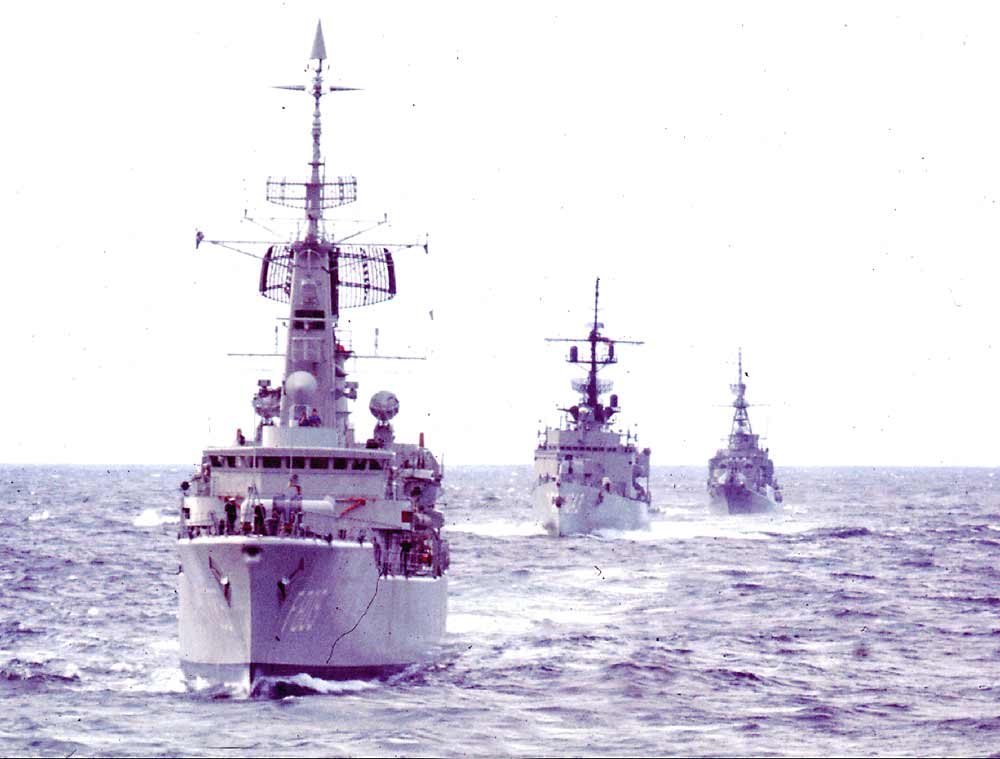
Lübeck following McDonnell and Van Nes into Lisbon in February 1975

Lübeck was built by Stülcken & Sohn, Hamburg. She was laid down on 28 October 1959, launched on 23 July 1960, and was commissioned on 6 June 1963.

After 25 years of service, Lübeck was taken out of active service on 30 September 1988 and sold to Turkey. On 14 November, she set sail for Gölcük, Kocaeli, Turkey with skeleton crew of 140 personnel. She was formally decommissioned on 1 December 1988 and handed over to the Turkish Naval Forces. Turkish navy used her as spare parts source for other Köln-class frigate in Turkish service.

== See also ==
- List of frigates
- List of German Federal Navy ships
- List of naval ships of Germany
