= USS Montgomery County =

U.S. Navy Tank Landing Ship (1945–1968)

- USS Montgomery County (LST-1041) moored at Little Creek Amphibious Base, Virginia, 1951

History

United States
- Name: USS LST-1041
- Builder: Dravo Corporation, Pittsburgh
- Laid down: 12 November 1944
- Launched: 20 January 1945
- Commissioned: 19 February 1945
- Decommissioned: 31 January 1956
- Renamed: USS Montgomery County (LST-1041), 1 July 1955
- Stricken: 1 June 1960
- Fate: Sold to West Germany, August 1961; Scrapped, 1968

General characteristics
- Class & type: LST-542-class tank landing ship
- Displacement: 1,625 long tons (1,651 t) light; 3,640 long tons (3,698 t) full
- Length: 328 ft (100 m)
- Beam: 50 ft (15 m)
- Draft: Unloaded : 2 ft 4 in (0.71 m) forward; 7 ft 6 in (2.29 m) aft; Loaded : 8 ft 2 in (2.49 m) forward; 14 ft 1 in (4.29 m) aft
- Propulsion: 2 × General Motors 12-567 diesel engines, two shafts, twin rudders
- Speed: 12 knots (22 km/h; 14 mph)
- Boats & landing craft carried: 2 or 6 × LCVPs
- Troops: Approximately 130 officers and enlisted men
- Complement: 8–10 officers, 89–100 enlisted men
- Armament: 8 × 40 mm guns; 12 × 20 mm guns

USS Montgomery County (LST-1041) was an LST-542-class tank landing ship built for the United States Navy during World War II. Named after counties in 18 U.S. states, she was the only U.S. Naval vessel to bear the name.

Originally laid down as LST-1041 by the Dravo Corporation of Neville Island, Pennsylvania, on 12 November 1944; launched on 20 January 1945, sponsored by Mrs. N. L. Gibson; ferried down the Ohio and Mississippi Rivers to New Orleans; and commissioned on 19 February 1945.

== Service history ==
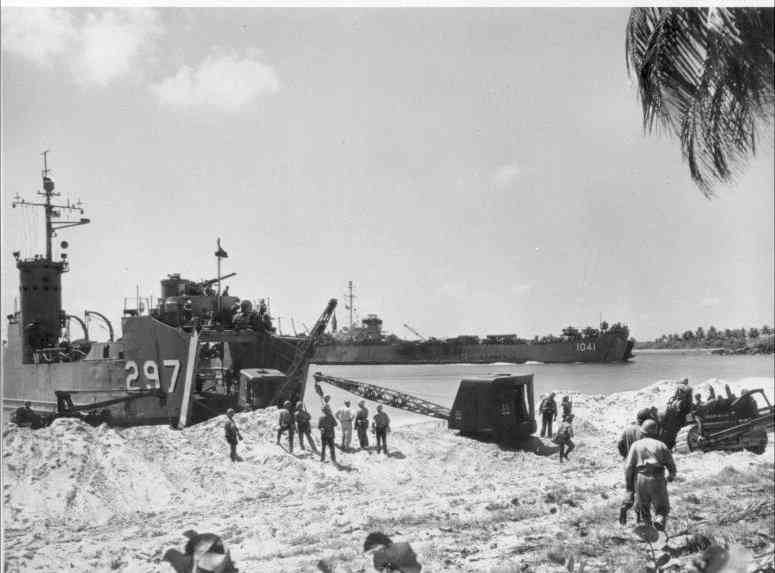
USS LSM-297 and LST-1041 beached while unloading equipment, date and place unknown.

=== World War II, 1945 ===
Following a shakedown along the Gulf coast, LST-1041 loaded cargo and sailed for duty in the Pacific in early April. Steaming via the Panama Canal to Seattle, Washington where she was loaded with army trucks before sailing to Pearl Harbor. From Pearl Harbor she sailed to Eniwetok, Marshalls on 12 June and began cargo shuttle missions to American bases in the mid- and western Pacific. Operating with LST Group 97, she sailed later in the month via Guam and Saipan to Okinawa where she unloaded military supplies in mid-July. Later that month she returned to the Marshalls and was anchored at Eniwetok when the Japanese agreed to cease hostilities.

=== Post-war activities, 1945–1956 ===
LST-1041 thence returned to the western Pacific and from 2 to 24 September she supported occupation operations in Japan. After occupation duty, she sailed for the United States and arrived Norfolk, Virginia, on 6 December. During the next decade this LST maintained a busy pattern of logistics, support, and amphibious training operations. She took part in numerous Atlantic Fleet and type training exercises. Training and readiness operations sent her from the east coast to the Caribbean and the Gulf of Mexico.

In addition, LST-1041 took part in providing valuable support for operations off Greenland and in Baffin Bay. She carried out three logistics runs; and, during her third mission from September to November 1953 she assisted in salvaging the SS Atlantic Waters after the merchant ship grounded in the approaches to Goose Bay, Labrador.

In September 1955 she was deployed to the Mediterranean for duty with the 6th Fleet. During the next few months she ranged the Mediterranean from Greece to southern France. Thence, she resumed training duty out of Norfolk in February 1956. Named USS Montgomery County (LST-1041) on 1 July 1955, the LST continued duty with the Atlantic Fleet Amphibious Force until 31 January 1956 when she was decommissioned at Green Cove Springs, Florida.

=== Decommissioning and sale ===
Assigned to the Atlantic Reserve Fleet, she remained in her Florida berthing area until mid-1960. Her name was struck from the Naval Vessel Register on 1 June 1960. In August 1961 she was sold under the terms of the Military Assistance Program to the West Germany. Scheduled for conversion to battle damage repair ship, the conversion was never undertaken and she was scrapped in 1968 without having seen any commissioned service in the German Navy.

== See also ==
- List of United States Navy LSTs
