= German frigate Augsburg (F222) =

Köln-class frigate of Bundesmarine

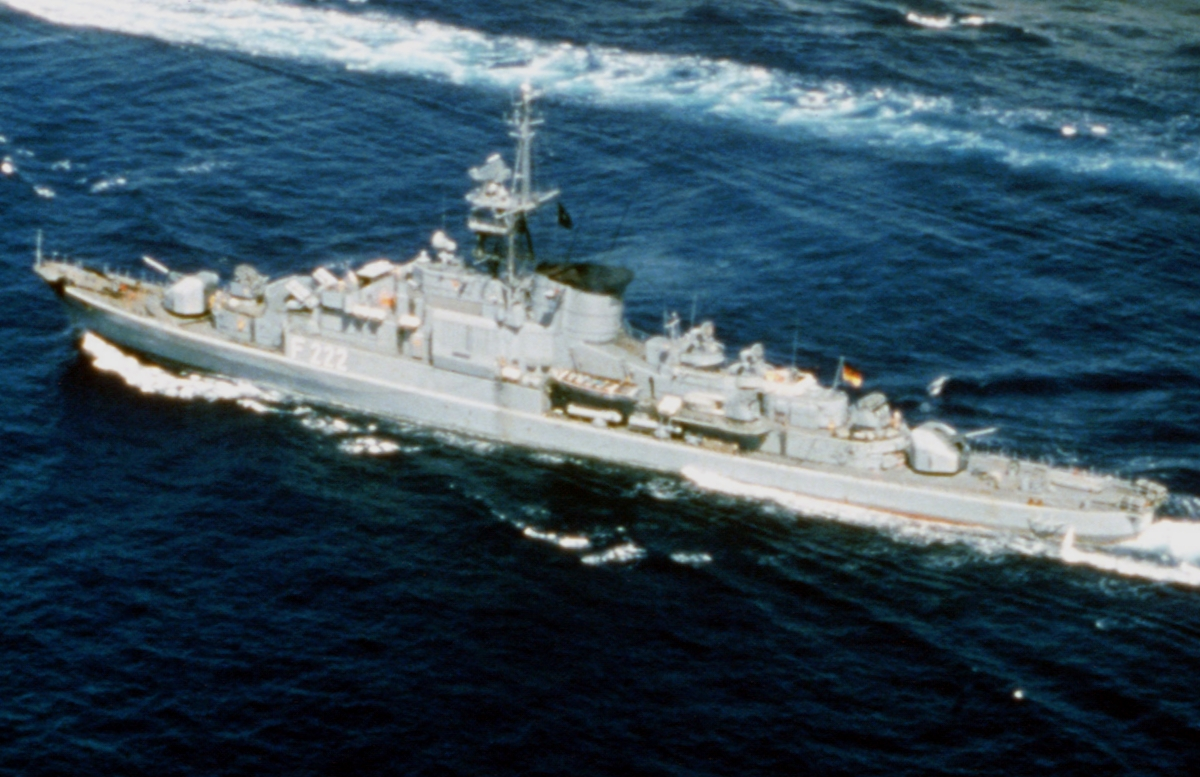
- Augsburg in 1982

History

Germany
- Name: Augsburg
- Namesake: Augsburg
- Builder: H. C. Stülcken Sohn
- Laid down: 29 October 1958
- Launched: 15 August 1959
- Commissioned: 7 April 1962
- Decommissioned: 30 March 1988
- Home port: Wilhelmshaven
- Identification: Pennant number: F222
- Fate: Scrapped, December 1989

General characteristics
- Type: Köln-class frigate
- Displacement: 2090 tons standard; 2750 tons full load
- Length: 105 m (344 ft 6 in) waterline; 109.80 m (360 ft 3 in) overall
- Beam: 11 m (36 ft 1 in)
- Draught: 4.60 m (15 ft 1 in)
- Propulsion: 2 shaft CODAG; 2 Brown Boveri & Cie gas turbines, 8832 kilowatts each (24,000 hp total); 4 MAN 16-cylinder diesel engines, 2208 kilowatts each (12,000hp total)
- Speed: 32 knots (59 km/h; 37 mph)
- Range: 3,450 nautical miles (6,390 km; 3,970 mi) at 12 knots (22 km/h; 14 mph), 900 nautical miles (1,670 km; 1,040 mi) at 30 knots (56 km/h; 35 mph)
- Endurance: Bunker: 360 t
- Complement: 238
- Sensors & processing systems: Navigation radar KH14/9; Target designation radar DA-02; Surface search radar SGR103; Fire control radar M44, M45; Sonar PAE/CWE hull mounted medium frequency sonar
- Armament: 2 × single METL 100 mm guns; 2 × dual Breda 40 mm/L70 guns; 2 × single Bofors 40 mm/L70 guns; 4 × single 533 mm torpedo tubes, 4 × quad 375 mm ASW rockets; depth charges, mine-laying capacity

Augsburg (F222) is the third ship of the Köln-class frigates of the German Navy.

== Design ==
The Type 120 or Köln-class frigates were built as smooth-deckers and had very elegant lines. The very diagonally cut bow and the knuckle ribs in the foredeck made it easy to navigate. The hull and parts of the superstructure were made of shipbuilding steel, other superstructure parts were made of aluminum. Due to the installation of gas turbines, large side air inlets were necessary, which could be closed by lamellas. The stern was designed as a round stern. The large funnel was sloped and skirted. Behind the bridge superstructure stood the tall lattice mast with radar and other antennas. The hull was divided into 13 watertight compartments.

On the forecastle was a 10 cm gun, behind it, set higher, a 4 cm twin gun. Behind it stood two quadruple anti-submarine missile launchers 37.5 cm from Bofors. A 4 cm Bofors single gun on each side of the aft superstructure and another 4 cm double mount at the end of the superstructure. There was a second 10 cm gun on the quarterdeck. In addition, there were two 53.3 cm torpedo tubes behind the front superstructures. They were used to fire Mk-44 torpedoes. Mine rails were laid behind the torpedo tubes and ran to the stern.

== Construction and career ==
Augsburg was laid down on 29 October 1958 and launched on 15 August 1959 in Stülcken & Sohn, Germany. She was commissioned on 7 April 1962.

One of the last deployments of the ship was an official visit to the Dutch municipality of Den Helder in 1987. As of October 1 of the same year, the ship was out of service and was decommissioned on 30 August 1988.

After that it was mothballed at naval arsenal Wilhelmshaven and was on sale. The ship was sold for demolition via the Vebeg, towed to Hamburg on 17 November 1989 and scrapped there in December.

== Gallery ==
Augsburg gallery

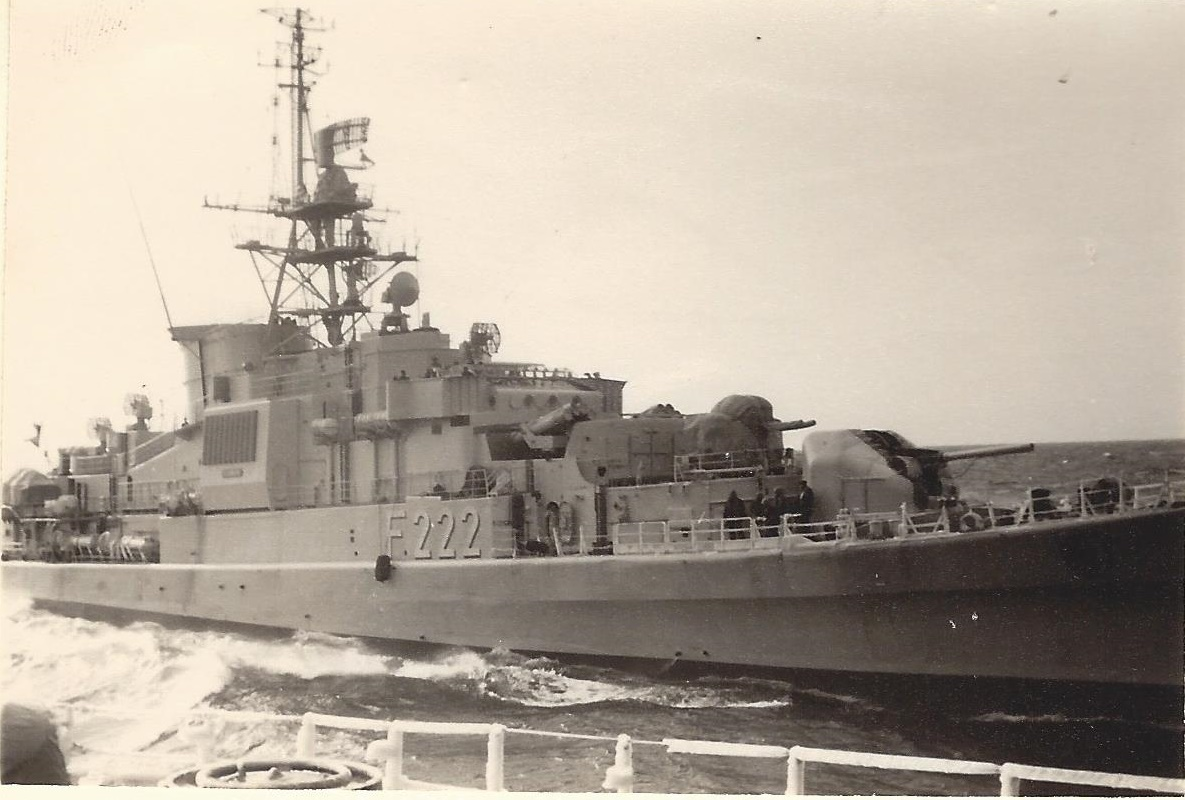
Augsburg in March 1971

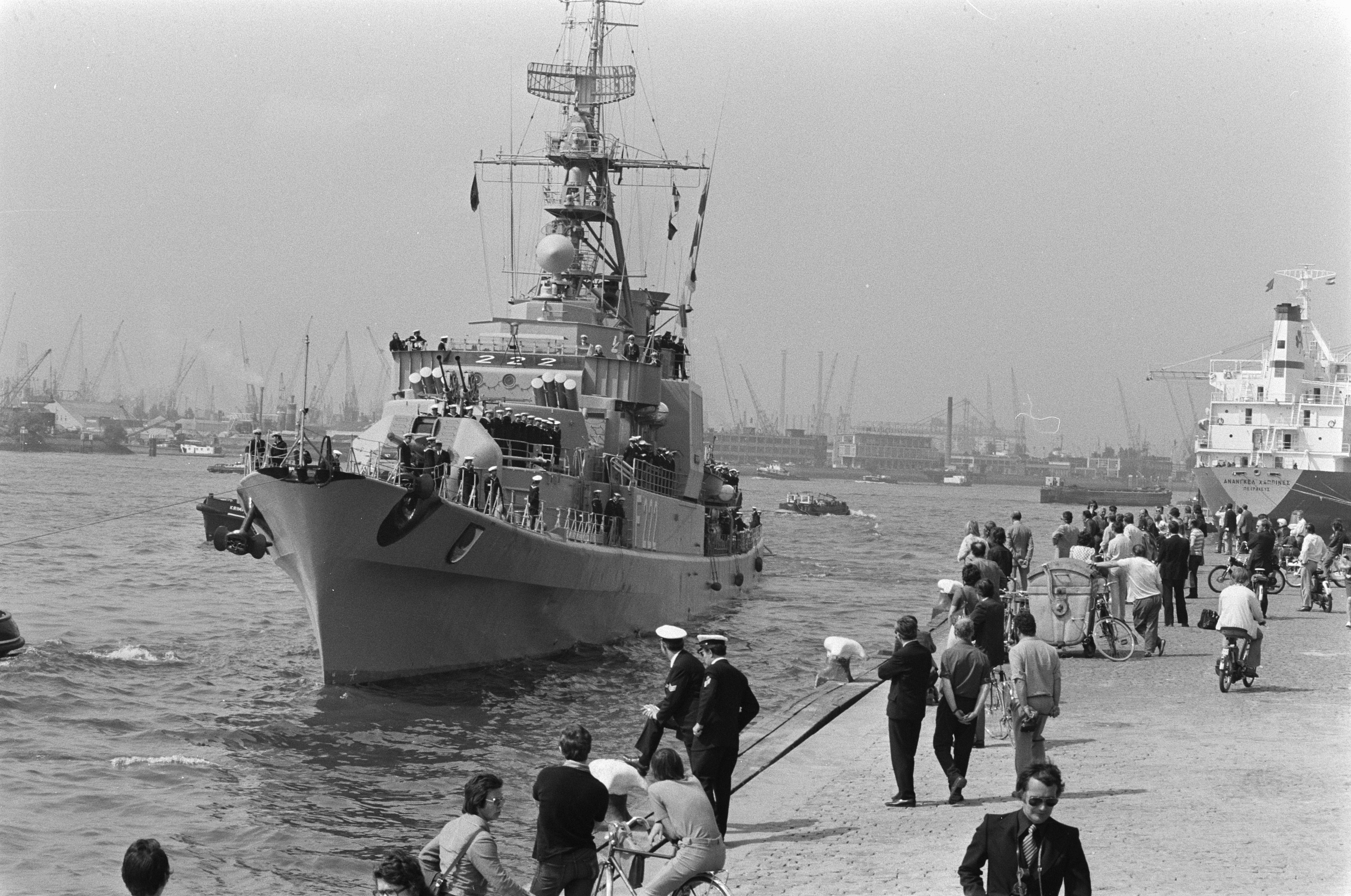
Augsburg on 21 June 1974

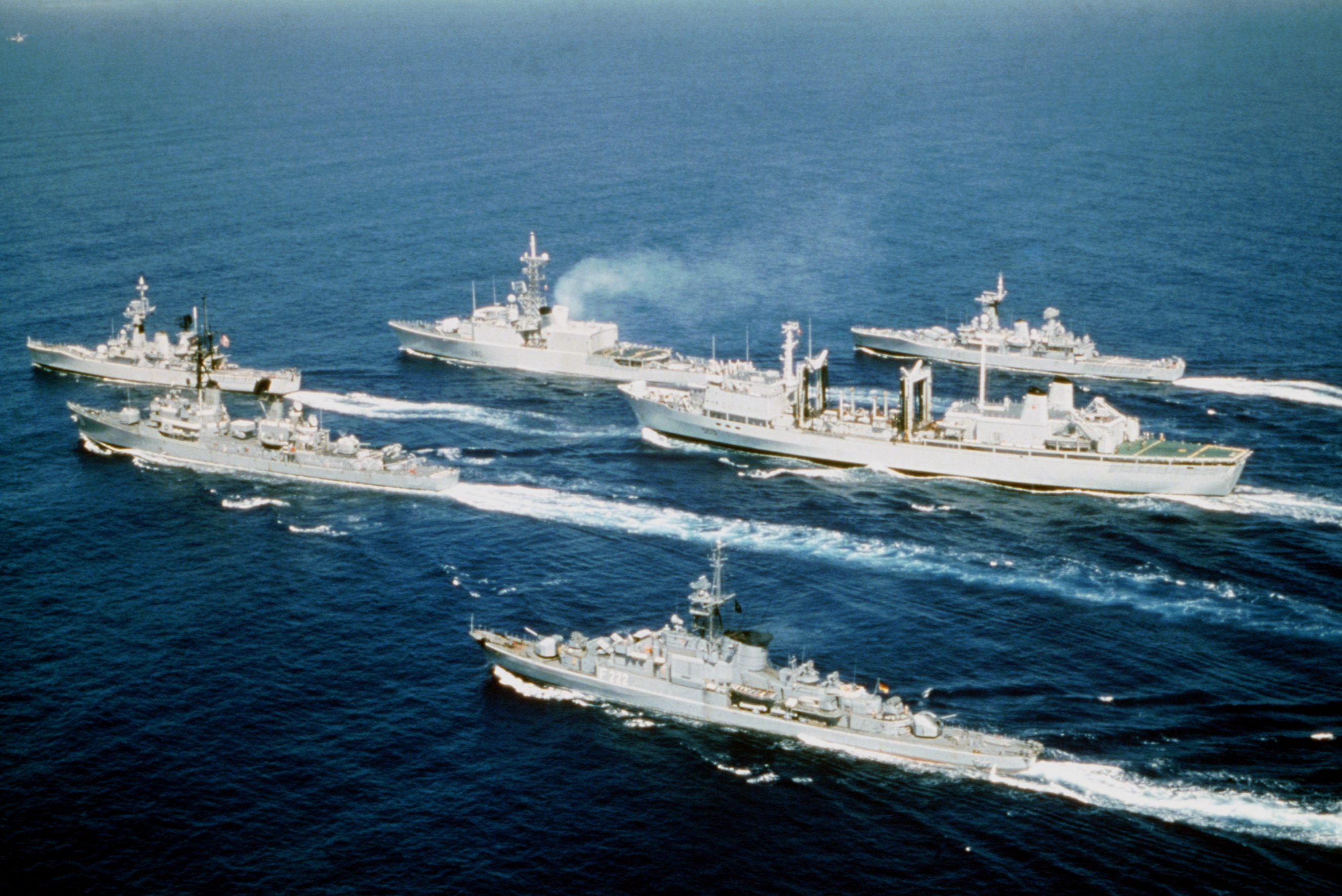
Augsburg in 1982

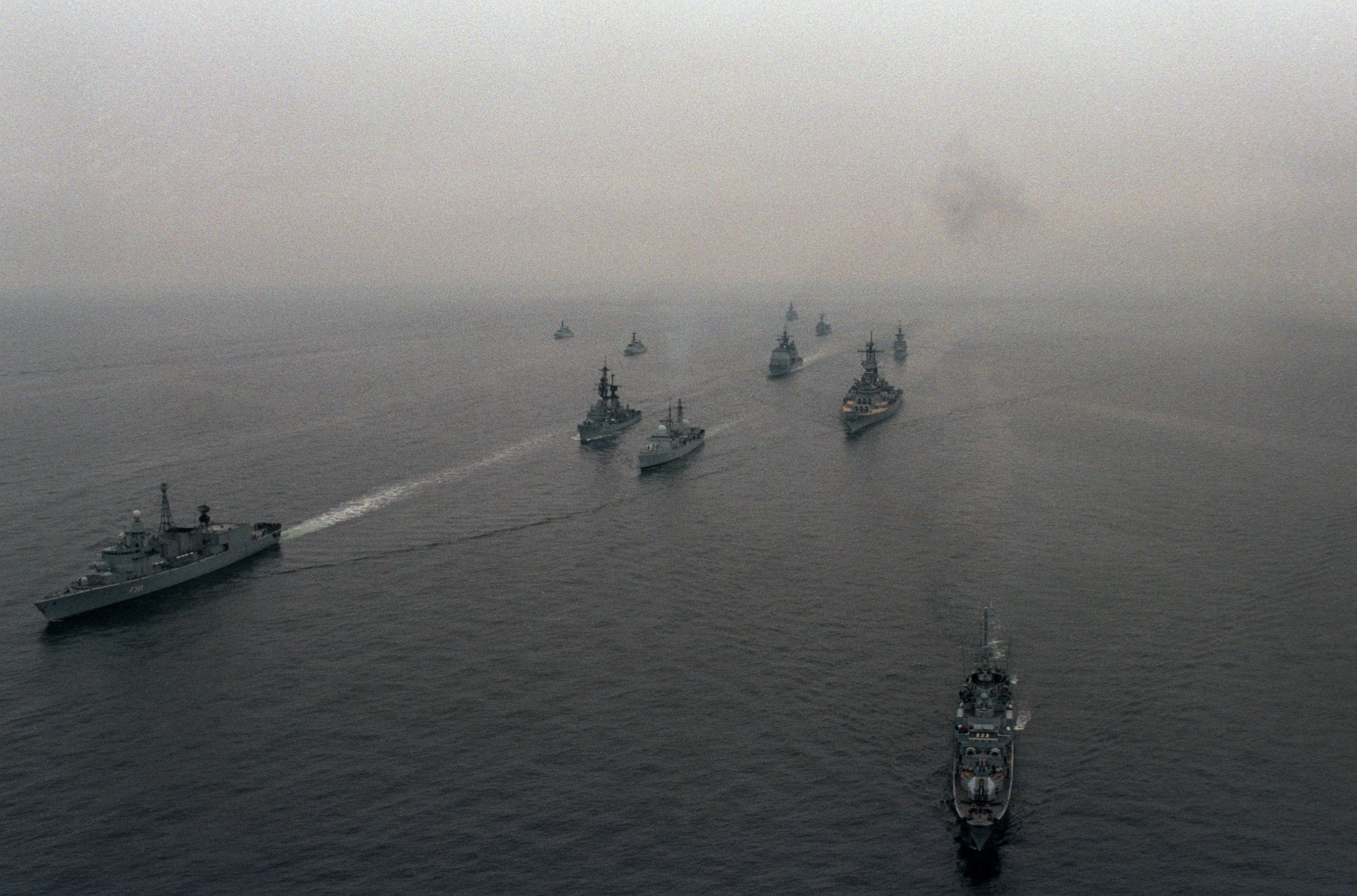
Augsburg during BALTOPS in 1985
