= German frigate Emden (F221) =

Köln-class frigate of Bundesmarine

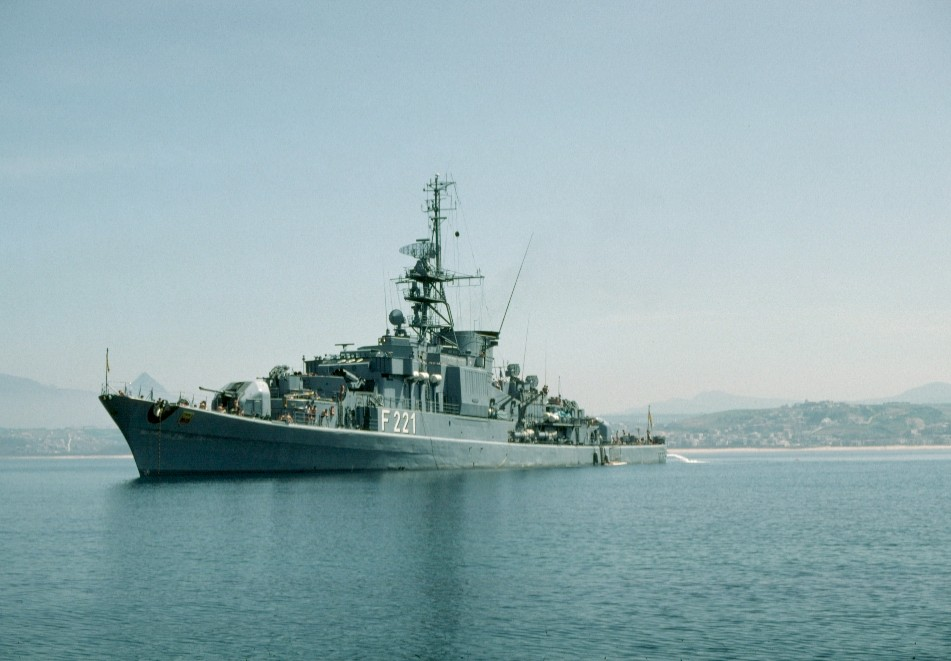
- Emden in 1983

History

Germany
- Name: Emden
- Namesake: Emden
- Builder: H. C. Stülcken Sohn
- Laid down: 15 April 1958
- Launched: 21 March 1959
- Commissioned: 24 October 1961
- Decommissioned: 23 September 1983
- Home port: Wilhelmshaven
- Identification: Pennant number: F221
- Fate: Sold to Turkish Navy
- Badge

Turkey
- Name: Gemlik
- Namesake: Gemlik
- Commissioned: 23 September 1983
- Decommissioned: 1994
- Identification: Pennant number: D-361
- Fate: Scrapped, January 1994

General characteristics
- Type: Köln-class frigate
- Displacement: 2090 tons standard; 2750 tons full load
- Length: 105 m (344 ft 6 in) waterline; 109.80 m (360 ft 3 in) overall
- Beam: 11 m (36 ft 1 in)
- Draught: 4.60 m (15 ft 1 in)
- Propulsion: 2 shaft CODAG; 2 Brown Boveri & Cie gas turbines, 8832 kilowatts each (24,000 hp total); 4 MAN 16-cylinder diesel engines, 2208 kilowatts each (12,000hp total)
- Speed: 32 knots (59 km/h; 37 mph)
- Range: 3,450 nautical miles (6,390 km; 3,970 mi) at 12 knots (22 km/h; 14 mph), 900 nautical miles (1,670 km; 1,040 mi) at 30 knots (56 km/h; 35 mph)
- Endurance: Bunker: 360 t
- Complement: 238
- Sensors & processing systems: Navigation radar KH14/9; Target designation radar DA-02; Surface search radar SGR103; Fire control radar M44, M45; Sonar PAE/CWE hull mounted medium frequency sonar
- Armament: 2 × single METL 100 mm guns; 2 × dual Breda 40 mm/L70 guns; 2 × single Bofors 40 mm/L70 guns; 4 × single 533 mm torpedo tubes, 4 × quad 375 mm ASW rockets; depth charges, mine-laying capacity

Emden (F221) was the second ship of the Köln-class frigates and the fourth ship to serve in one of the navies of Germany named after the city of Emden in the German state of Lower Saxony. Her predecessor was the light cruiser Emden which served in the Reichsmarine of the Weimar Republic and later the Kriegsmarine of Nazi Germany during the Second World War.

In 1983 the Emden was decommissioned and sold to the Turkish Navy where she was renamed the Gemlik and saw service until 1994 when she was decommissioned and scrapped. The Emden has been followed up by two more ships of the same name in the German Navy, the frigate Emden that entered service in 1983 and a corvette expected to be commissioned in 2025.

== Design ==
The Type 120 or Köln-class frigates were built as smooth-deckers and had very elegant lines. The very diagonally cut bow and the knuckle ribs in the foredeck made it easy to navigate. The hull and parts of the superstructure were made of shipbuilding steel, other superstructure parts were made of aluminum. Due to the installation of gas turbines, large side air inlets were necessary, which could be closed by lamellas. The stern was designed as a round stern. The large funnel was sloped and skirted. Behind the bridge superstructure stood the tall lattice mast with radar and other antennas. The hull was divided into 13 watertight compartments.

On the forecastle was a 10 cm gun, behind it, set higher, a 4 cm twin gun. Behind it stood two quadruple anti-submarine missile launchers 37.5 cm from Bofors. A 4 cm Bofors single gun on each side of the aft superstructure and another 4 cm double mount at the end of the superstructure. There was a second 10 cm gun on the quarterdeck. In addition, there were two 53.3 cm torpedo tubes behind the front superstructures. They were used to fire Mk-44 torpedoes. Mine rails were laid behind the torpedo tubes and ran to the stern.

== Construction and career ==
Emden was laid down on 15 April 1958 and launched on 21 March 1959 at H. C. Stülcken Sohn in Hamburg, Germany. She was commissioned on 24 October 1961.

On 23 September 1983, she was decommissioned and handed over to the Turkish Navy. After a fire on board, the ship was decommissioned and scrapped in Aliağa from January 1994.

== Gallery ==
Emden gallery

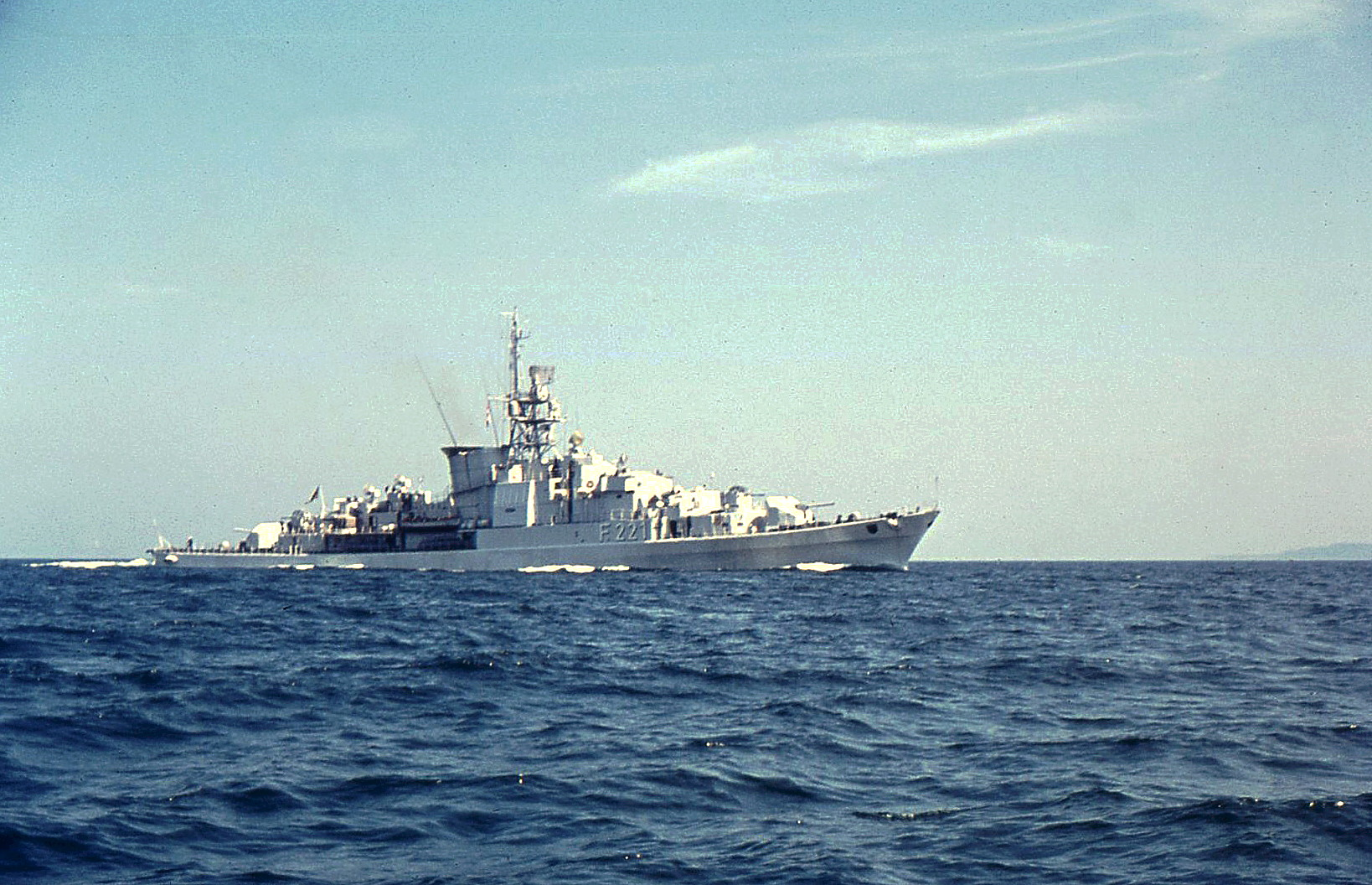
Emden in 1963

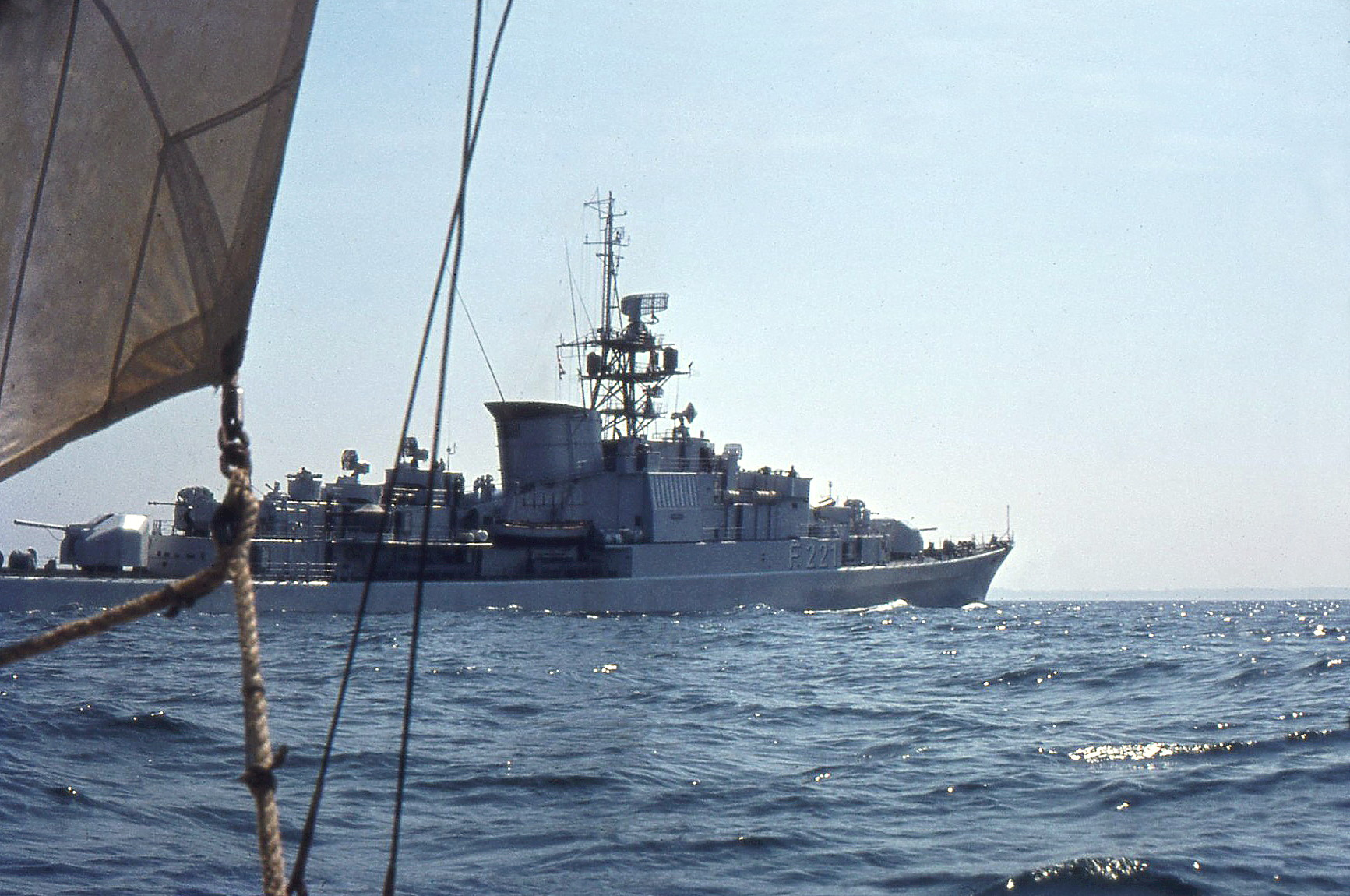
Emden in 1963

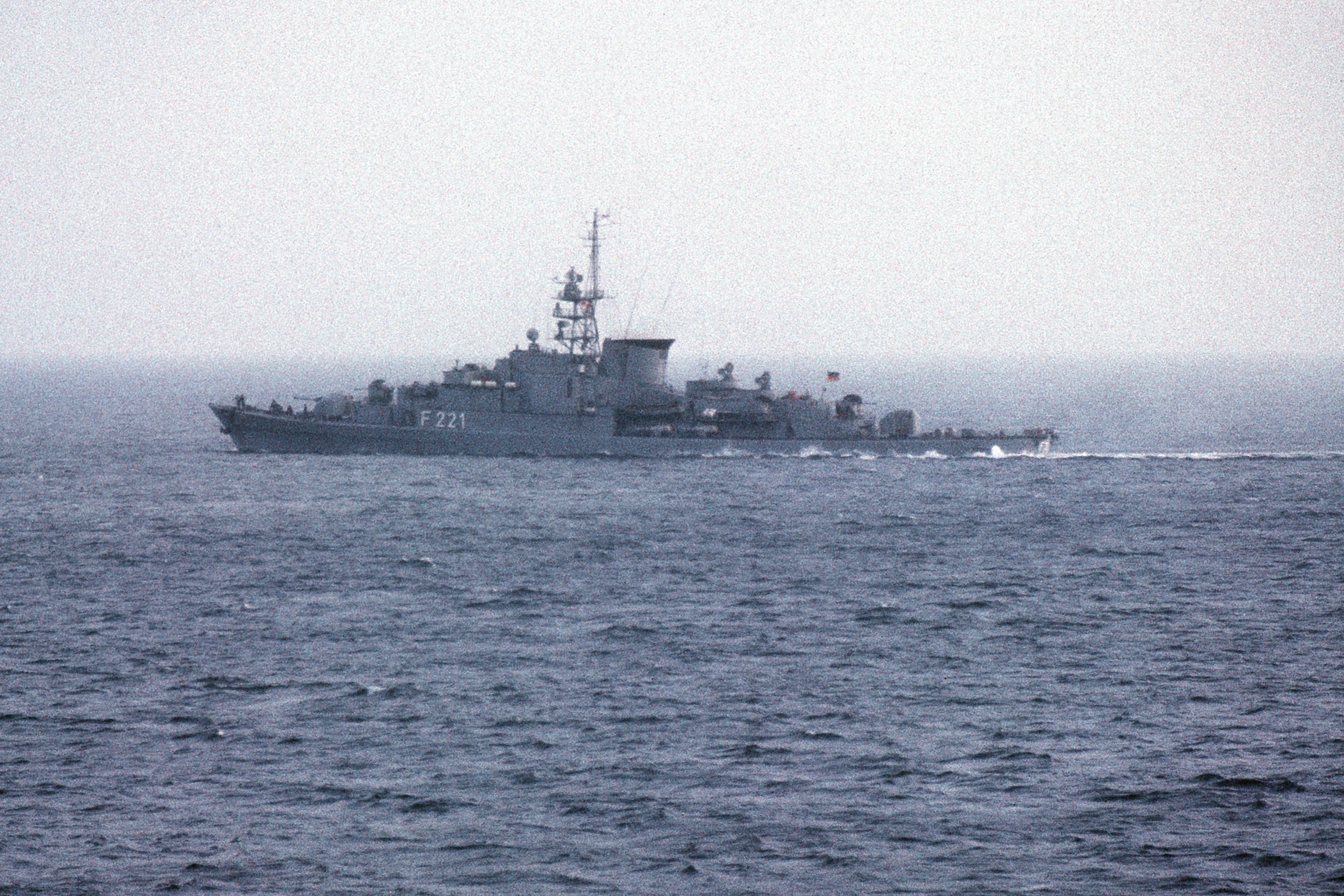
Emden in 1982
