= German frigate Karlsruhe (F223) =

Köln-class frigate of Bundesmarine

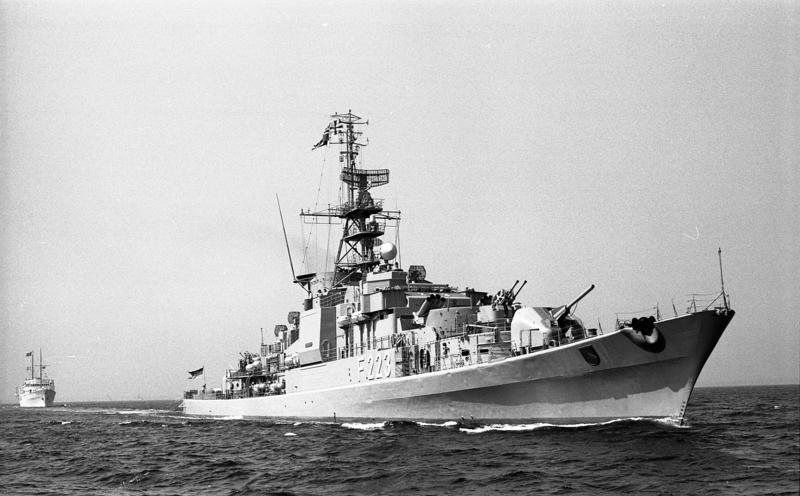
- Karlsruhe in June 1973

History

Germany
- Name: Karlsruhe
- Namesake: Karlsruhe
- Builder: H. C. Stülcken Sohn
- Laid down: 29 October 1958
- Launched: 15 August 1959
- Commissioned: 7 April 1962
- Decommissioned: 28 March 1983
- Home port: Wilhelmshaven
- Identification: Pennant number: F223
- Fate: Sold to Turkish Navy 1983
- Badge

Turkey
- Name: Gazi Osman Pasa
- Namesake: Gazi Osman Pasa
- Renamed: Gelibolu, 1984
- Namesake: Gelibolu
- Commissioned: 28 March 1983
- Decommissioned: 27 June 1994
- Identification: Pennant number: D-360
- Fate: Scrapped

General characteristics
- Type: Köln-class frigate
- Displacement: 2090 tons standard; 2750 tons full load
- Length: 105 m (344 ft 6 in) waterline; 109.80 m (360 ft 3 in) overall
- Beam: 11 m (36 ft 1 in)
- Draught: 4.60 m (15 ft 1 in)
- Propulsion: 2 shaft CODAG; 2 Brown Boveri & Cie gas turbines, 8832 kilowatts each (24,000 hp total); 4 MAN 16-cylinder diesel engines, 2208 kilowatts each (12,000hp total)
- Speed: 32 knots (59 km/h; 37 mph)
- Range: 3,450 nautical miles (6,390 km; 3,970 mi) at 12 knots (22 km/h; 14 mph), 900 nautical miles (1,670 km; 1,040 mi) at 30 knots (56 km/h; 35 mph)
- Endurance: Bunker: 360 t
- Complement: 238
- Sensors & processing systems: Navigation radar KH14/9; Target designation radar DA-02; Surface search radar SGR103; Fire control radar M44, M45; Sonar PAE/CWE hull mounted medium frequency sonar
- Armament: 2 × single METL 100 mm guns; 2 × dual Breda 40 mm/L70 guns; 2 × single Bofors 40 mm/L70 guns; 4 × single 533 mm torpedo tubes, 4 × quad 375 mm ASW rockets; depth charges, mine-laying capacity

Karlsruhe (F223) is the fourth ship of the Köln-class frigates of the German Navy.

== Design ==
The Type 120 or Köln-class frigates were built as smooth-deckers and had very elegant lines. The very diagonally cut bow and the knuckle ribs in the foredeck made it easy to navigate. The hull and parts of the superstructure were made of shipbuilding steel, other superstructure parts were made of aluminum. Due to the installation of gas turbines, large side air inlets were necessary, which could be closed by lamellas. The stern was designed as a round stern. The large funnel was sloped and skirted. Behind the bridge superstructure stood the tall lattice mast with radar and other antennas. The hull was divided into 13 watertight compartments.

On the forecastle was a 10 cm gun, behind it, set higher, a 4 cm twin gun. Behind it stood two quadruple anti-submarine missile launchers 37.5 cm from Bofors. A 4 cm Bofors single gun on each side of the aft superstructure and another 4 cm double mount at the end of the superstructure. There was a second 10 cm gun on the quarterdeck. In addition, there were two 53.3 cm torpedo tubes behind the front superstructures. They were used to fire Mk-44 torpedoes. Mine rails were laid behind the torpedo tubes and ran to the stern.

== Construction and career ==
Karlsruhe was laid down on 29 October 1958 and launched on 15 August 1959 in Stülcken & Sohn, Germany. She was commissioned on 7 April 1962.

The Karlsruhe was sold to Turkish Navy after active service in the German Navy, and, since 28 March 1983, it sailed there under the Turkish flag as the destroyer Gazi Osman Pasa with the identification D-360.

In 1984, it was renamed Gelibolu but kept the Identification D-360. Her last decommissioning took place on 27 June 1994.

== Gallery ==
Karlsruhe gallery

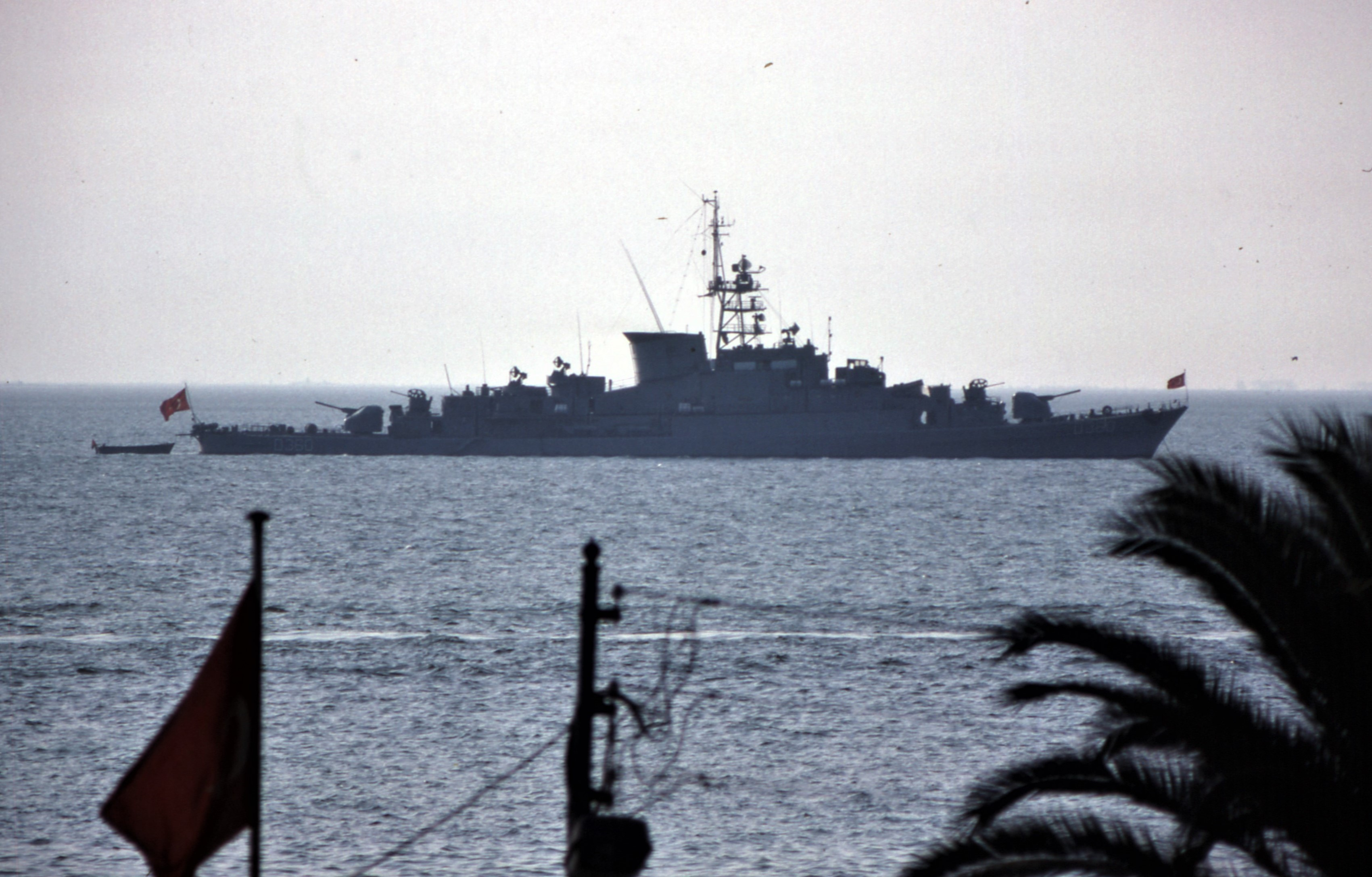
Gelibolu in 1988
