= Köln-class frigate =

German frigate class

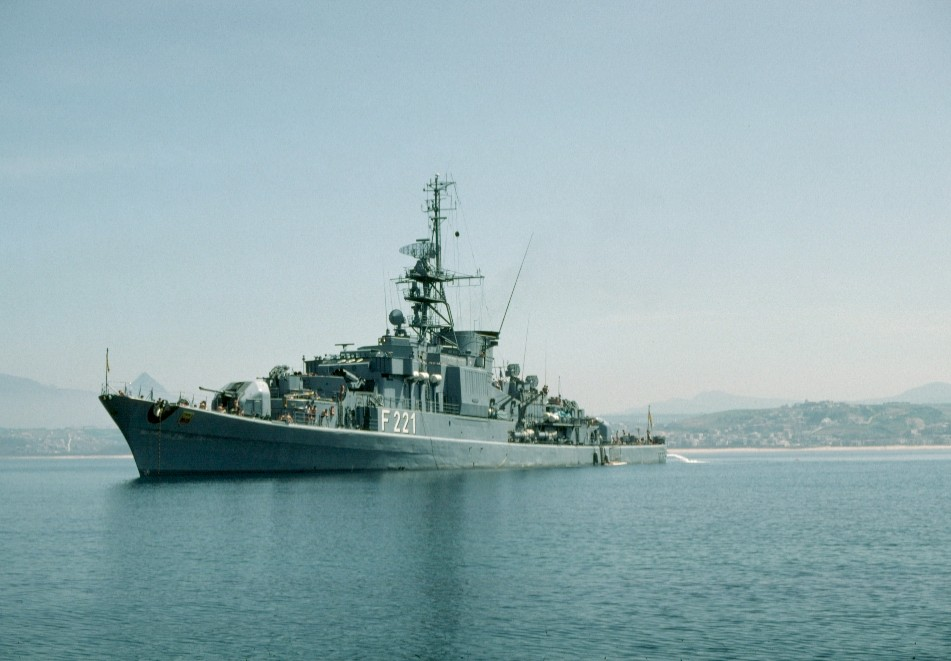
- Emden in 1983

Class overview
- Name: Köln
- Builders: H. C. Stülcken Sohn, Hamburg
- Operators: German Navy; Turkish Navy
- Succeeded by: Bremen class
- Built: 1957–1964
- In commission: 1961–1989
- Completed: 6
- Laid up: 1
- Retired: 6

General characteristics
- Type: Frigate
- Displacement: 2090 tons standard, 2750 tons full load
- Length: 105 m (344 ft 6 in) waterline; 109.80 m (360 ft 3 in) overall
- Beam: 11 m (36 ft 1 in)
- Draught: 4.60 m (15 ft 1 in)
- Propulsion: 2 shaft CODAG; 2 Brown Boveri & Cie gas turbines, 8832 kilowatts each (24,000 hp total); 4 MAN 16-cylinder diesel engines, 2208 kilowatts each (12,000hp total)
- Speed: 32 knots (59 km/h; 37 mph)
- Range: 3,450 nautical miles (6,390 km; 3,970 mi) at 12 knots (22 km/h; 14 mph), 900 nautical miles (1,670 km; 1,040 mi) at 30 knots (56 km/h; 35 mph)
- Endurance: Bunker: 360 t
- Complement: 238
- Sensors & processing systems: Navigation radar KH14/9; Target designation radar DA-02; Surface search radar SGR103; Fire control radar M44, M45; Sonar PAE/CWE hull mounted medium frequency sonar
- Armament: 2 × 100 mm METL 53 guns; 2 twin barreled 40 mm/L70 Breda Mod 58 II MDL anti-aircraft guns; 2 single barreled 40 mm/L70 Bofors Mod 58 anti-aircraft guns; 4 × 533 mm torpedo tubes, 2 quadruple 375 mm anti-submarine mortar; depth charges, mine-laying capacity

The F120 or Köln class was a six-ship class of frigates operated by the Bundesmarine. The ships of this class were the first major warships built in Germany after World War II.

They were the world's first ships to feature a combined diesel and gas propulsion system. The ships were mainly constructed for anti-submarine warfare. All of the class' ships received numerous refits during their long careers with new electronics and torpedo tubes being fitted. They were eventually replaced by Type 122 frigates in the 1980s with Braunschweig being the last to be decommissioned in 1989. Four ships of the class were sold to the Turkish Navy.

== Design ==
The F120 class frigates were constructed as flush deckers. Overall the hull was made of shipbuilding steel, with many other materials also used in different parts of the ship. The steeply angled bow and the overall streamlined hull design ensured good handling characteristics. Combined with a wide use of aluminium, which provided an adequate weight distribution, preventing the ship from being top-heavy despite the fairly large superstructure, this ensured decent seaworthiness, enabling the class to operate safely in rough north Atlantic waters. Notably the overall design of the superstructure was heavily influenced by the propulsion system used, with gas turbines requiring large air intakes, covered by louvres on the ship's sides. The funnel was located behind these intakes and the main mast directly above them.

== Propulsion ==
The class was the first in the world to use the CODAG (COmbined Diesel And Gas) propulsion system, with it consisting of four 16-cylinder diesel engines produced by MAN and two gas turbines produced by BBC.

The electricity aboard was provided by six generators, about half of which were normally turned off during regular service.

== Armament ==
The main artillery armament of the ship consisted of two 100 mm model 53 single gun turrets, which were capable of both anti-ship and anti-aircraft combat due to high vertical guidance angles and fast turret rotation speed. Additionally the frigates were equipped with 40 mm Bofors guns for anti-air defence.

For anti-submarine warfare, the class came fitted with two quadruple 375 mm Bofors rocket launchers located on the foredeck behind the 100 mm turret, and depth charges located on the stern.

Additionally the ships had four 533 mm torpedo tubes.

== Operational history ==
The six ships of the Köln-class comprised the 2. Geleitgeschwader (Second frigate squadron), stationed first in Cuxhaven, and then in Wilhelmshaven. Being commissioned between 1961 and 1964, they together with the newly built Hamburg-class destroyers quickly became the backbone of the Bundesmarine's surface fleet, also being the first major warships constructed in Germany after the Second World War. In 1968 two of the ships, Emden (F221) and Karlsruhe (F223) were separated from the second frigate squadron and stationed in Flensburg for the next 6 years, rejoining the squadron in 1974. After several decades of service the ships were eventually retired with four of them (Emden, Karlsruhe, Lübeck and Braunschweig) sold to Turkey, one (Augsburg) scrapped and one (Köln) being transferred to Einsatsausbildungszentrum Schadenabwehr Marine (Naval damage control training centre) in Neustadt, where it serves as a training hulk to this day.

== List of ships ==
Pen- nant	Name	Shipyard	Laid down	Launched	Com- missioned	Decom- missioned	Fate
F220	Köln	Stülcken & Sohn	21 December 1957	6 December 1958	15 April 1961	17 December 1982	Used as training hulk in Neustadt
F221	Emden	Stülcken & Sohn	15 April 1958	21 March 1959	24 October 1961	23 September 1983	Sold to the Turkish Navy as TCG Gemlik (D-361); destroyed in a fire
F222	Augsburg	Stülcken & Sohn	29 October 1958	15 August 1959	7 April 1962	30 March 1988	Broken up in Hamburg
F223	Karlsruhe	Stülcken & Sohn	15 December 1958	15 August 1959	15 December 1962	28 March 1983	sold to the Turkish Navy as TCG Gazi Osman Pasa (D-360); renamed Gelibolu 1984
F224	Lübeck	Stülcken & Sohn	28 October 1959	23 July 1960	6 June 1963	1 December 1988	sold to the Turkish Navy for cannibalization
F225	Braunschweig	Stülcken & Sohn	28 July 1960	3 February 1962	16 June 1964	4 July 1989	sold for spare parts to the Turkish Navy, 1989, replaced TCG Gemlik (D-361) after fire on originally-named ship, 1992

== See also ==
- List of naval ship classes of Germany
- List of frigate classes by country

Equivalent frigates of the same era

- Garcia class
- Oslo class
- Leander class
- Bronstein class
- João Belo class
- Commandant Rivière class
- Tribal class
