= H. C. Stülcken Sohn =

- Industry: Shipbuilding
- Founded: 1846
- Defunct: 1966
- Fate: Merged
- Successor: Blohm+Voss
- Headquarters: Hamburg, Germany,
- Number of employees: ~1,600

H. C. Stülcken Sohn (also known as Stülcken-Werft) was a German shipbuilding company located in Hamburg and founded in 1846 by Heinrich Christoph Stülcken.

During World War I the company built one single U-boat for the Kaiserliche Marine, the U-157, which under command of the famous Max Valentiner undertook the longest cruise in the war from November 27, 1917 to April 15, 1918, a total of 139 days. During World War II the company built 24 VIIC U-boats for the Kriegsmarine. The company used slave labour of the Neuengamme concentration camp with its own subcamp.

After the war the company constructed several vessels for the Bundesmarine. In the 1950s the company developed the Stülcken derrick, a lifting device for very heavy cargo.

In 1966 the company was absorbed by Blohm + Voss.

== Ships built by H. C. Stülcken Sohn (selection) ==
=== Civilian ships ===
- No. 5 Elbe (1883)

=== Navy training ship ===
- Barquentine Dewaruci, Indonesian Navy (1932–1952)
- Barquentine Jadran, Montenegrin Navy (1930–1931)

=== Naval ships ===
==== Frigates ====
- 6 × Köln class frigates (1958–1962)

==== Destroyers ====
- 4 × Hamburg class destroyers (1959–1963)

==== Auxiliary ====
- Deutschland (A59) (1959)

==== Submarines (U-boats) ====
- SM U-157 (1916)
- 24 × Type VIIC submarines (1939–1944)
