= Karlsruhe (disambiguation) =

Karlsruhe is a city in southern Germany.

Karlsruhe may also refer to:

== Places ==
- Karlsruhe (district), a rural district (Landkreis) in the north-west of Baden-Württemberg, Germany
- Karlsruhe (region), one of the four administrative regions (Regierungsbezirk) of Baden-Württemberg, Germany, located in the north-west of the state
- Karlsruhe, North Dakota, a town in the United States founded by German-Russians
- Karlsruhe, a German-Russian village established by German immigrants in what is now Stepove, Mykolaiv Raion, Ukraine

== In rail transport ==
- Karlsruhe model, a type of train system with different types of trains running on the same track
- Karlsruhe Stadtbahn, a German tram-train system
- Karlsruhe Hauptbahnhof, a railway station in the city of Karlsruhe
- Karlsruhe Local Railway, a former metre-gauge light railway
- Maschinenbau-Gesellschaft Karlsruhe, a defunct locomotive and railway wagon manufacturer
- Karlsruhe (EMU), class 425 electric multiple unit of Rhine-Neckar S-Bahn

== Ships ==
- SS Karlsruhe (1889), a passenger steamer for North German Lloyd; sold 1908
- SS Karlsruhe (1905), a cargo steamer for Hamburg America Line; torpedoed and sunk in 1945
- Karlsruhe, the name from 1928 of the former SS Prinzess Irene, a passenger steamer for North German Lloyd; scrapped 1932
- SMS Karlsruhe (1912), World War I German light cruiser, launched 1912
- SMS Karlsruhe (1916), Königsberg class light cruiser, launched 1916
- German cruiser Karlsruhe, 7,200 ton K class light cruiser, sunk World War II
- German frigate Karlsruhe (F223), Köln-class frigate, launched 1959, decommissioned 1983
- German frigate Karlsruhe (F212), Bremen-class (Type 122) frigate, launched 1982, decommissioned 2017
- German corvette Karlsruhe (F267), Braunschweig-class (Type 130) corvette, under construction, laid down 2020
- Ersatz Karlsruhe, a Cöln class World War I cruiser

== In sports ==
- Karlsruher SC, a football club
- Karlsruher FV, a football club
- BG Karlsruhe, a basketball club
- Post Südstadt Karlsruhe, a sports club
- Karlsruhe Storm, a lacrosse team

== Other uses ==
- Karlsruhe Accurate Arithmetic (KAA), an approach to high-accuracy computation in computer sciences
- Karlsruhe Congress, an international scientific meeting in 1860
- Karlsruhe metric, a measure of distance
- Karlsruhe Nuclide Chart, a table of nuclides (atomic species)
- Weltklasse in Karlsruhe, an annual indoor track and field competition

== See also ==
- Carlsruhe (disambiguation)
- German ship Karlsruhe
