= Action of 3 March 2009 =

German Navy capturing Somali pirate skiff

- Part of Piracy in Somalia; Operation Atalanta
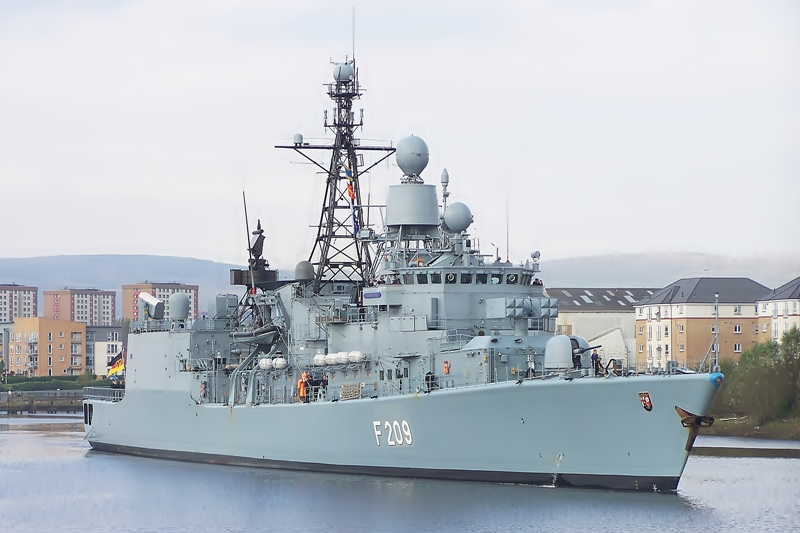
- Rheinland-Pfalz
Date	3 March 2009
Location	Gulf of Aden
Result	German-American victory

Belligerents
Germany; United States	Somali pirates

Commanders and leaders
Markus Rehbein	Mohamud Hashi

Strength
Frigate Rheinland-Pfalz; 2 helicopters	1 skiff

Casualties and losses
None	9 captured 1 skiff captured

The action of 3 March 2009 took place when the German Bremen-class frigate Rheinland-Pfalz chased and captured a pirate skiff in the Gulf of Aden, after the persons on board the small vessel fired at and attempted to stop the German-owned tanker MV Courier. The operation marked the first time that the German Navy captured a hostile vessel at sea since World War II.

== Background ==
On 19 December 2008, the German parliament – the Bundestag – gave the green light for German participation in Operation Atalanta. The German Navy mission would be to escort the merchant ships involved in the World Food Programme, and under certain circumstances, prevent piracy activities against commercial shipping in the operational area. The deployment of the German Navy bore some criticism from navy officers, who deemed the mission of searching for small fiberglass craft in an area nine times the size of Germany as "damned hard work".

On 22 January 2009, the frigate Rheinland-Pfalz, under the command of Markus Rehbein, relieved her sister ship Karlsruhe on her patrol station around the Horn of Africa.

== Action ==
On 3 March at 7:12 local time, the 14,969 ton Antigua and Barbuda-registered container ship MV Courier, owned by a Bremen-based shipping company and crewed by Filipino sailors, sent a distress message reporting the attack of pirates on board a small vessel. The assailants fired rocket-propelled grenades and automatic rifles at the freighter. The emergency call was received by Rheinland-Pfalz, which was located 50 nautical miles (93 km; 58 mi) away. The German warship dispatched her Westland Lynx helicopter to the scene, which opened warning shots at the hostile launch. The Lynx was joined by a Sikorsky SH-60 Seahawk from the American guided missile cruiser USS Monterey.

A couple of hours later, the pirate skiff was intercepted by the German frigate and seized by German marines, who captured nine suspects. The German boarding party found a cache of one rocket launcher, three AK-47 rifles, a Tokarev pistol, a carbine and an automatic rifle. All these weapons were thrown overboard by the Germans, for "security reasons", according to German Defence Minister Franz Josef Jung. Some of the attackers came from Sudan. This was the first time that the German Navy seized a hostile vessel and her crew at sea since World War II.

== Aftermath ==
The nine suspects were handed over to Kenyan authorities on 10 March 2009, in accordance with an agreement reached between the European Union and Kenya just four days before. The Kenyan high court questioned the procedures, on the basis that key evidence was unintentionally destroyed by the German Navy when the arms were disposed of. The nine men were eventually released by a Kenyan court on 9 November 2010.
