= German ship Karlsruhe =

Several naval ships of Germany have been named Karlsruhe after the city of Karlsruhe, Germany:

- SMS Karlsruhe (1912), World War I German light cruiser, launched 1912, sunk 1914
- SMS Karlsruhe (1916), Königsberg-class light cruiser, launched 1916, scuttled 1919
- German cruiser Karlsruhe, 7,200 ton Königsberg-class light cruiser, launched 1927 sunk 1940
- German frigate Karlsruhe (F223), Köln-class frigate, launched 1957, decommissioned 1983
- German frigate Karlsruhe (F212), Bremen-class (Type 122) frigate, launched 1982, decommissioned 2017
- German corvette Karlsruhe, a Braunschweig-class corvette laid down 2020 and launched 2024

== Others ==
- Ersatz Karlsruhe, Cöln-class German World War I light cruiser. Not completed, scrapped in 1920.
