= German frigate Emden (F210) =

Bremen-class frigate.

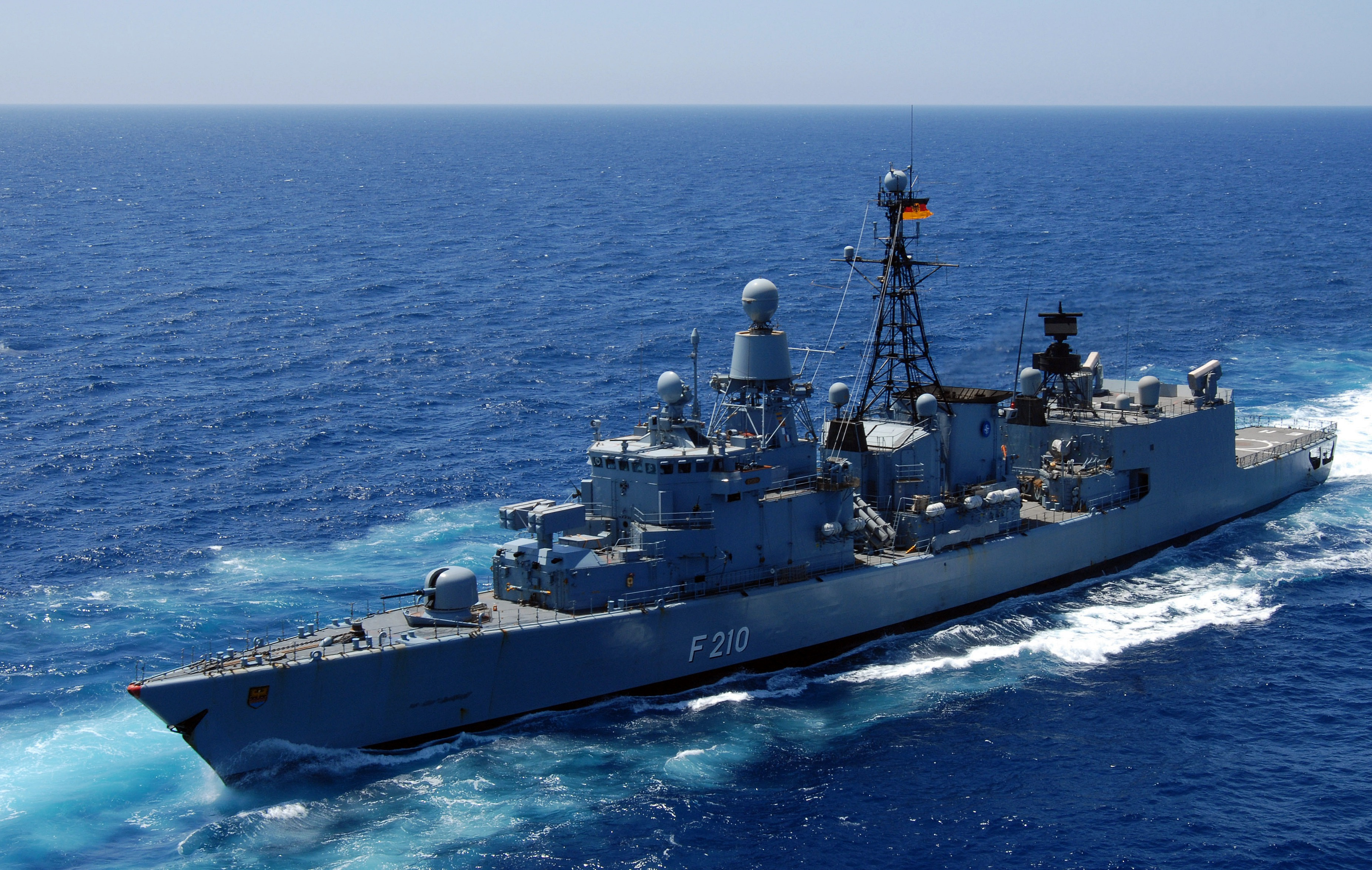
- Emden in 2009

History

Germany
- Name: Emden
- Builder: Nordseewerke, Emden
- Laid down: 23 June 1980
- Launched: 17 December 1980
- Commissioned: 7 October 1983
- Decommissioned: 29 November 2013
- Identification: Pennant number: F210; MMSI number: 211210250; Call sign: DRAT
- Status: to be scrapped in Aliaga

General characteristics
- Class & type: Bremen-class frigate
- Displacement: 3,680 tonnes (3,620 long tons)
- Length: 130.50 m (428 ft 2 in)
- Beam: 14.60 m (47 ft 11 in)
- Draft: 6.30 m (20 ft 8 in)
- Installed power: CODOG (Combined diesel or gas); 2 × MTU 20V956 TB92 diesel engines, 8.14 MW (10,920 hp) total; 2 × General Electric LM2500 gas turbines, 38 MW (51,000 hp) total; 2 × Renk STG 150-50 gearboxes, 10:1 (diesel) and 720:47 (turbine); 4 × Deutz MWM diesel-generators, 750 kW (1,010 hp)
- Propulsion: 2 × propeller shafts, controllable pitch, five-bladed Sulzer-Escher propellers
- Speed: 30 knots (56 km/h)
- Range: more than 4,000 nmi (7,400 km) at 18 knots (33 km/h)
- Complement: 202 crew plus 20 aviation
- Sensors & processing systems: 1 × EADS TRS-3D air search radar (three-dimensional); 1 × WM 25 combined surface search and fire control radar I/J band; 1 × Thales Nederland STIR 180 fire-control radar I/J/K band; 1 × Kelvin Hughes Nucleus 5000 I band navigation radar; 1 × STN Atlas DSQS-23BZ hull-mounted sonar
- Electronic warfare & decoys: ESM/ECM EADS FL 1800S; 2 × SCLAR decoys; SLQ-25 Nixie torpedo decoy
- Armament: Naval guns: 1 × OTO-Melara 76 mm dual-purpose gun; 2 × Mauser MLG27 27 mm autocannons; Antiaircraft warfare: 1 × 8-cell launch system, 16 × Sea Sparrow surface to air missiles; CIWS: 2 × MK 49 launcher, 21 × RAM each; Anti-ship missiles: 2 × quadruple Harpoon anti-ship missile launchers; Antisubmarine warfare: 2 × Mark 32 324-mm twin torpedo launchers, 8 × DM4A1 or Mark 46 torpedo
- Aircraft carried: Place for 2 Sea Lynx Mk.88A helicopters equipped with torpedoes, air-to-surface missiles Sea Skua, and/or heavy machine gun.

Emden was a Bremen-class frigate of the German Navy. She was the fourth ship of the class, and the fifth ship to serve with one of the navies of Germany to be named after the city of Emden, in Lower Saxony. Her predecessor was the frigate Emden of the Bundesmarine, one of the Köln class.

== Construction and commissioning ==
Emden was laid down in June 1980 at the yards of Nordseewerke, Emden and launched on 17 December 1980. Her sponsor was Elfriede Klinkenborg, the wife of the Lord Mayor of Emden. After undergoing trials Emden was commissioned on 7 October 1983 . During her later career she was based at Wilhelmshaven as part of 4. Fregattengeschwader, forming a component of Einsatzflottille 2. The Emden continued the tradition of her predecessors in the German navies, in carrying a large Iron Cross decoration, in honour of the achievements of the first SMS Emden during the First World War. The Iron Cross was displayed at the front of the bridge until her removal from active service. It was then presented to Australia by Inspector of the Navy Vizeadmiral Axel Schimpf on 6 October 2013, at the Royal Australian Navy's International Fleet Review marking the centenary of the Royal Australian Navy's establishment at Sydney.

== Service ==
In 1984 Emden's crew won the "Barbarian Prize" for the best gunnery of the fleet. Later that year she carried out combat training in the UK, at the Isle of Portland. From January to March 1994 Emden was the flagship of Kapitän zur See Henning Bess, the commander of 4. Fregattengeschwader, during Destroyer Exercise (DESEX) 1/94 in the South Atlantic. The Emden, the tanker Rhön, the supply ship Freiburg and the frigate Bremen sailed to Dakar, accompanied at times by ships of the Royal Navy and the French Navy. The German ships continued on to call at Buenos Aires, Montevideo, Mar del Plata and Recife. At Roosevelt Roads Naval Station they were joined by the frigate Niedersachsen for gunnery practice. In 1995 and 1996 she was the flagship of Flottillenadmiral Frank Ropers. In June 1996 Emden was active in the Adriatic Sea as part of NATO's Operation Sharp Guard, the maritime blockade of the former Yugoslavia during the Yugoslav Wars. In early October 1998 she collided with the Kaiser Wilhelm Bridge. She went on to serve in several other international missions, including Operation Enduring Freedom in three separate deployments in 2002, 2006 and 2008, and as part of Standing NATO Maritime Group 1 in Operation Active Endeavour from 18 October to 6 November 2006.

During Emden's 2008 deployment in support of Operation Enduring Freedom, which lasted from 12 February to 8 July, the frigate was active off the Horn of Africa. On 21 April she launched her helicopter in response to a Somalian pirate attack on the Japanese oil tanker Takayama. The helicopter successfully dispersed the pirates. During the night of 23 to 24 April Emden escorted the sailing ship Star Clipper, after she was approached by several suspicious speedboats. On 28 June she assisted the merchant vessel Amiya Scan, which had just been released from pirate control. The Emden provided emergency water, food, fuel and first aid equipment, and the services of a medical team.

It was planned that in early 2009 Emden would sail to Australia as part of Standing NATO Maritime Group 1. During the course of the voyage she would have passed close to the location where the earlier SMS Emden, a cruiser of the Imperial German Navy, had been sunk in 1914. The voyage was cancelled when Emden was instead assigned to transit the Suez Canal to take part in Operation Atalanta, the EU's anti-piracy mission off the Horn of Africa. Emden carried out a second deployment with Operation Atalanta, beginning in January 2010, until her relief on 19 May 2010 by the frigate Schleswig-Holstein. On 19 February she was sent to investigate a dhow and a skiff acting strangely. The dhow was discovered abandoned and was taken in tow to prevent it being a hazard to shipping. The dhow was later returned to its Yemeni owner by the Italian ship Etna. On 11 March she was routed to an area where a number of attacks had been reported. She came across a mothership and two skiffs, and a boarding party was dispatched. One skiff was sunk and the other seized as evidence. On 18 March she responded to reports of an attack on the Spanish fishing vessel Albatun 2. En route she discovered two pirate skiffs and a mothership, destroying the skiffs and seizing grappling ladders. Two days later another mothership and two skiffs were discovered. A team boarded the mothership and destroyed weapons, grappling hooks and ladders and the two skiffs.

In 2013 Emden participated in the navy's annual training voyage (Einsatz- und Ausbildungsverband), before returning to Wilhelmshaven, where she was removed from active service on 15 June 2013, and formally decommissioned by Fregattenkapitän Hendrik Hülsmann on 29 November 2013.
