= Action of 7 September 2009 =

German frigate capturing Somali pirate skiff

Coordinates: 14°03′04″N 49°10′44″E

- Part of Operation Atalanta
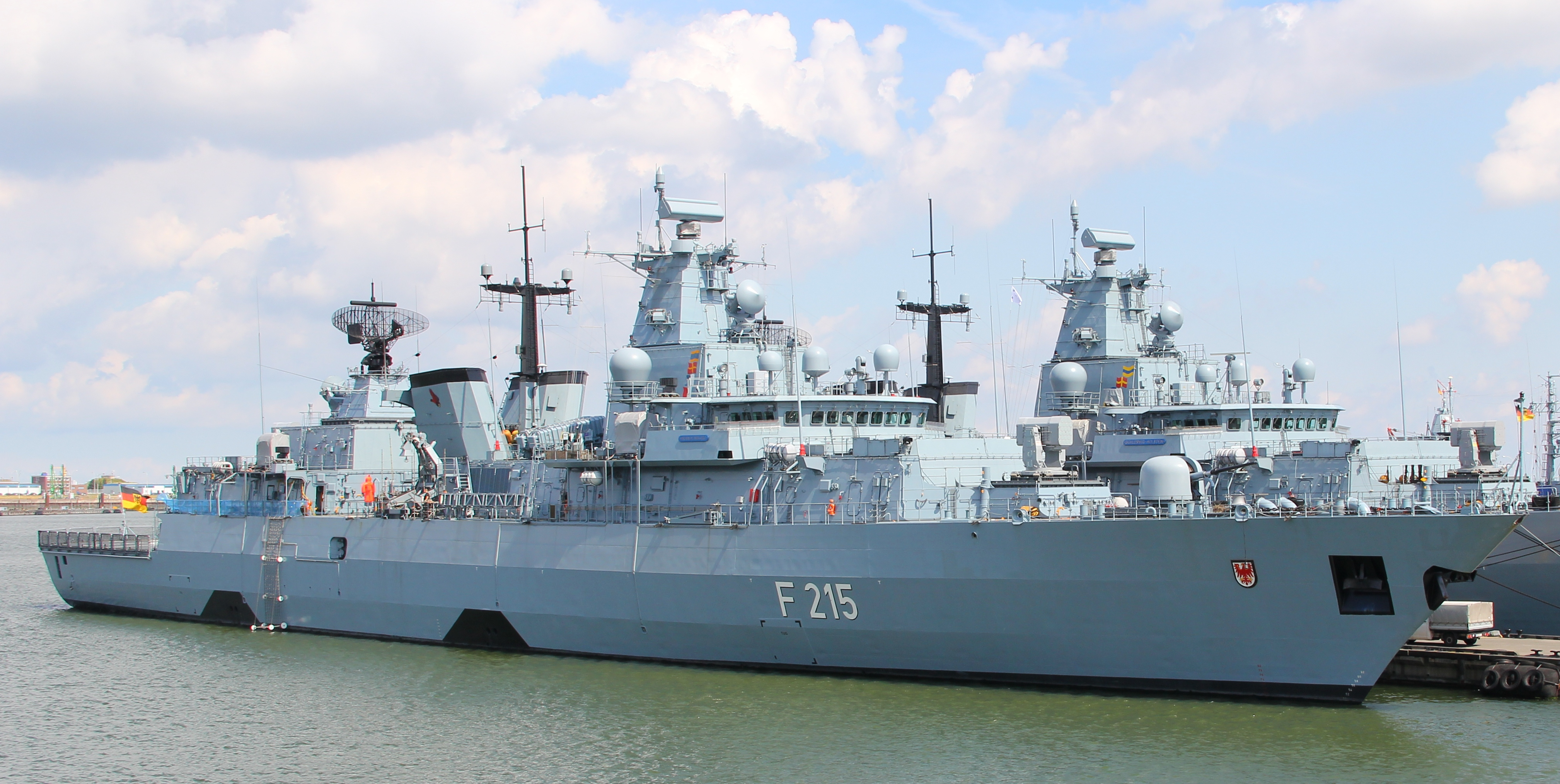
- Brandenburg at anchor, 31 July 2013
Date	7 September 2009
Location	Off Mukalla, Gulf of Aden
Result	German victory

Belligerents
Germany; German Navy	Somali pirates

Commanders and leaders
Torsten Ites	Unknown

Strength
1 frigate 1 helicopter	1 skiff

Casualties and losses
None	1 killed 4 captured 1 skiff captured

The action of 7 September 2009 took place when the German frigate Brandenburg, taking part of Operation Atalanta, chased and captured a pirate skiff south of Mukalla, in the Gulf of Aden, after suspicious activity was spotted on the small vessel by the frigate's helicopter during a reconnaissance mission. The boat was disabled by gunfire, and one suspect from her crew was killed. Four individuals were captured and weaponry confiscated and eventually destroyed.

== Background ==
The German Navy became involved in Operation Atalanta on 19 December 2008, when the Bundestag approved the German naval presence in the Horn of Africa both to support World Food Programme supply ships and to combat piracy.

Brandenburg began her mission on 29 June 2009, under the command of Fregattenkapitän Torsten Ites. In August, she assisted the crew of the container ship MV Hansa Stavanger when the vessel was released at Mombasa, Kenya, by Somali pirates who had captured her four months before.

== Action ==
On 7 September Brandenburg launched a Sea Lynx helicopter to perform a reconnaissance mission on a suspected skiff just south of Mukalla, Yemen. The Sea Lynx closed on and filmed five suspects on board the vessel throwing ladders and weapons overboard. The skiff was ordered to stop, but apparently refused to do so. An interpreter tried to convince the crew to stop, but to no avail. Then Brandenburg fired warning shots across her bow. As the boat continued undeterred, it was later known that the headquarters of Operation Atalanta authorized the German frigate to disable the skiff by gunfire. After the vessel was neutralized, a German Navy team from a rigid-hulled inflatable boat took control of the crew and seized a number of weapons. One of the suspects was injured by gunfire during the incident, and later died of his wounds onboard Brandenburg while receiving medical treatment. This was the first fatality caused by the Bundeswehr in the course of Operation Atalanta. The weaponry found on board the skiff was later destroyed.

== Aftermath ==
The German Navy eventually released the four surviving suspects. The body of the suspect killed in the action was handed back to his relatives in Somalia by the International Red Cross. The Bundeswehr decided not to extradite the men to Kenya after being advised by Operation Atalanta's headquarters that the men's conviction after the trial was not granted. At the time there was a deal with Kenya to judge in that country any act of piracy committed in the Indian Ocean, but on a case-by-case basis. Therefore, as the attack did not affect German interests, the skiff crewmembers were left in a craft within sight of the Somali coast.
