= German frigate Rheinland-Pfalz (F209) =

Bremen-class frigate of the German Navy

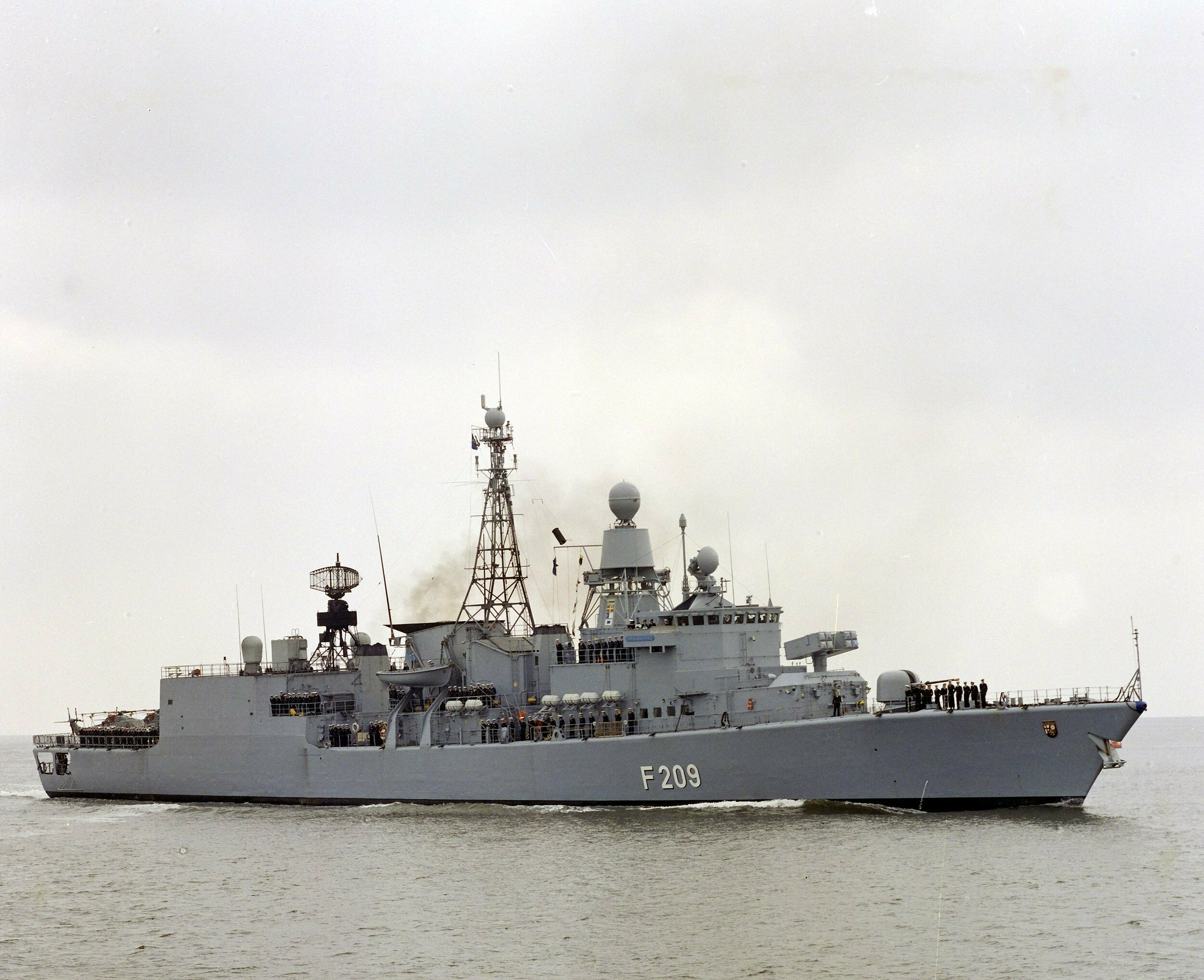
- Rheinland-Pfalz in 1989

History

Germany
- Name: Rheinland-Pfalz
- Builder: Blohm+Voss, Hamburg
- Laid down: 25 September 1979
- Launched: 3 September 1980
- Commissioned: 9 May 1983
- Decommissioned: 22 March 2013
- Identification: Pennant number: F209; MMSI number: 211210240; Callsign: DRAS
- Fate: Sold for scrapping in 2017

General characteristics
- Class & type: Bremen-class frigate
- Displacement: 3,680 tonnes (3,620 long tons)
- Length: 130.50 m (428 ft 2 in)
- Beam: 14.60 m (47 ft 11 in)
- Draft: 6.30 m (20 ft 8 in)
- Installed power: CODOG (Combined diesel or gas); 2 × MTU 20V956 TB92 diesel engines, 8.14 MW (10,920 hp) total; 2 × General Electric LM2500 gas turbines, 38 MW (51,000 hp) total; 2 × Renk STG 150-50 gearboxes, 10:1 (diesel) and 720:47 (turbine); 4 × Deutz MWM diesel-generators, 750 kW (1,010 hp)
- Propulsion: 2 × propeller shafts, controllable pitch, five-bladed Sulzer-Escher propellers
- Speed: 30 knots (56 km/h)
- Range: more than 4,000 nmi (7,400 km) at 18 knots (33 km/h)
- Complement: 202 crew plus 20 aviation
- Sensors & processing systems: 1 × EADS TRS-3D air search radar (three-dimensional); 1 × WM 25 combined surface search and fire control radar I/J band; 1 × Thales Nederland STIR 180 fire-control radar I/J/K band; 1 × Kelvin Hughes Nucleus 5000 I band navigation radar; 1 × STN Atlas DSQS-23BZ hull-mounted sonar
- Electronic warfare & decoys: ESM/ECM EADS FL 1800S; 2 × SCLAR decoys; SLQ-25 Nixie torpedo decoy
- Armament: Naval guns: 1 × OTO-Melara 76 mm dual-purpose gun; 2 × Mauser MLG27 27 mm autocannons; Antiaircraft warfare: 1 × 8-cell launch system, 16 × Sea Sparrow surface to air missiles; CIWS: 2 × MK 49 launcher, 21 × RAM each; Anti-ship missiles: 2 × quadruple Harpoon anti-ship missile launchers; Antisubmarine warfare: 2 × Mark 32 324-mm twin torpedo launchers, 8 × DM4A1 or Mark 46 torpedo
- Aircraft carried: Place for 2 Sea Lynx Mk.88A helicopters equipped with torpedoes, air-to-surface missiles Sea Skua, and/or heavy machine gun.

Rheinland-Pfalz was a Bremen-class frigate of the German Navy.

== Construction and commissioning ==
Rheinland-Pfalz was laid down in 1979 at the yards of Blohm+Voss, Hamburg and launched in September 1980. After undergoing trials she was commissioned on 9 May 1983.

== Service ==
=== Early deployments ===
Rheinland-Pfalz was involved in several foreign missions since her commissioning. From 1992 to 1996 she was deployed several times in the Adriatic Sea as part of Operation Sharp Guard, blockading the former Yugoslavia. In 1999 she supported Operation Allied Force, the NATO bombing of Yugoslavia. In 2001 she was part of a Destroyer Exercise (DESEX), followed by a deployment in 2004 with Operation Enduring Freedom – Horn of Africa, and in the Gulf of Aden. Rheinland-Pfalz took part in Operation Active Endeavour in the Mediterranean in 2005, and in 2006 joined the South African naval exercises Good Hope II. In early 2009 she was briefly once more part of Operation Active Endeavour, before departing for the waters off the Horn of Africa to participate in Operation Atalanta, combatting piracy off the coast of Somalia. She relieved her sister ship Karlsruhe on patrol on 22 January 2009.

=== Operation Atalanta 2009 ===
On 3 March at 7:12 local time, the 14,969 ton Antigua and Barbuda-registered container ship MV Courier, owned by a Bremen-based shipping company and crewed by Filipino sailors, sent a distress message reporting the attack of pirates on board a small vessel. The assailants fired rocket propelled grenades and automatic rifles at the freighter. The emergency call was received by the Rheinland-Pfalz, which was located 50 nautical miles away. The German warship dispatched her Westland Lynx helicopter to the scene, which fired warning shots at the hostile launch. The Sea Lynx was joined by a Sikorsky SH-60 Seahawk from the US guided-missile cruiser USS Monterey. A couple of hours later, the pirate skiff was intercepted by the German frigate and seized by German marines, who captured nine suspects. The German boarding party found a cache of one rocket launcher, three AK-47 rifles, a Tokarev pistol, a carbine and an automatic rifle. This was the first time that the German Navy seized a hostile vessel and her crew at sea since the Second World War.

Early in the morning of 30 March 2009, a group of Somali pirates approached the German naval replenishment tanker Spessart, opened fire upon her and attempted to board the vessel. The attack was averted by the on-board security detachment, who opened fire on the pirates. A chase then ensued, ending with the pirates being stopped and detained by the Rheinland-Pfalz. On 3 August 2009 the captured merchant vessel MV Hansa Stavanger was released from pirate control, with Rheinland-Pfalz and the frigate Brandenburg escorting her into port in Mombasa, Kenya.

=== Later service ===
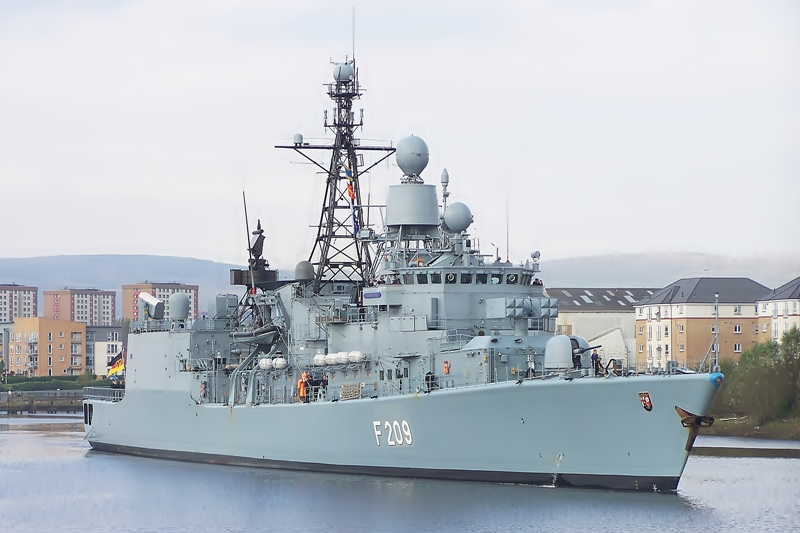
Rheinland-Pfalz in Glasgow, 2011

Rheinland-Pfalz took part in exercises and manoeuvrers in 2011, and in February that year sailed to the Libyan coast to assist in the evacuation of German citizens caught up in the Libyan Civil War. On 5 March 2011 Rheinland-Pfalz entered the Tunisian port of Gabès, along with the Brandenburg and the replenishment ship Berlin, embarking several hundred Egyptian refugees and transporting them to Alexandria.

On 1 February 2012 Rheinland-Pfalz left her homeport to join Standing NATO Maritime Group 1 in the Mediterranean. This would be her last international deployment. On 11 September 2012 Rheinland-Pfalz was removed from active duty, and was officially decommissioned on 22 March 2013, the second ship of the Bremen class to leave service. In April 2017 Rheinland-Pfalz was auctioned off via the state-owned Vebeg GmbH for scrapping. In December 2017, the ship arrived at Aliağa for scrapping. A successor ship, a Baden-Württemberg-class frigate, was christened Rheinland-Pfalz on 24 May 2017 by Malu Dreyer, minister-president of Rhineland-Palatinate.
