= Carlsruhe =

Carlsruhe is the name of several locations:

- Karlsruhe, a city in Germany (Karlsruhe was formerly Carlsruhe)
- Carlsruhe, South Australia, a locality in South Australia, Australia
- Carlsruhe, Victoria, a town in Victoria, Australia
- Carlsruhe O/S and Bad Carlsruhe, German names of the village Pokój in Poland

== See also ==
- Karlsruhe (disambiguation)
