= German frigate Bremen =

Bremen-class frigate

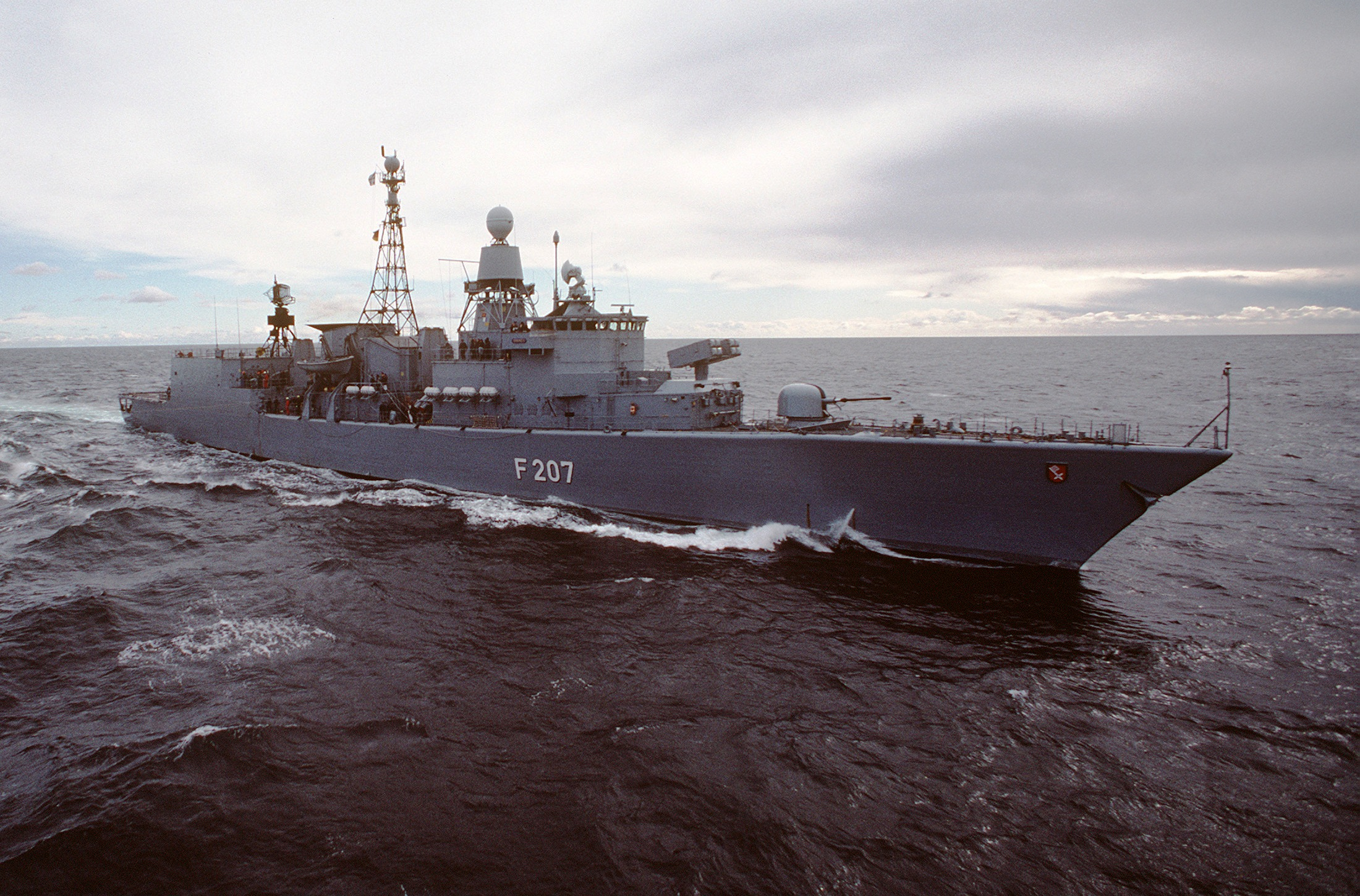
- Bremen in 1986

History

Germany
- Name: Bremen
- Builder: Bremer Vulkan, Bremen
- Laid down: 9 July 1979
- Launched: 27 September 1979
- Commissioned: 7 May 1982
- Decommissioned: 28 March 2014
- Identification: Pennant number: F207; MMSI number: 211210220; Call sign: DRAQ
- Fate: Scrapped, 2021

General characteristics
- Class & type: Bremen-class frigate
- Displacement: 3,680 tonnes (3,620 long tons)
- Length: 130.50 m (428 ft 2 in)
- Beam: 14.60 m (47 ft 11 in)
- Draft: 6.30 m (20 ft 8 in)
- Installed power: CODOG (Combined diesel or gas); 2 × MTU 20V956 TB92 diesel engines, 8.14 MW (10,920 hp) total; 2 × General Electric LM2500 gas turbines, 38 MW (51,000 hp) total; 2 × Renk STG 150-50 gearboxes, 10:1 (diesel) and 720:47 (turbine); 4 × Deutz MWM diesel-generators, 750 kW (1,010 hp)
- Propulsion: 2 × propeller shafts, controllable pitch, five-bladed Sulzer-Escher propellers, later replaced with seven-bladed ones from Wegemann & Co.
- Speed: 30 knots (56 km/h)
- Range: more than 4,000 nmi (7,400 km) at 18 knots (33 km/h)
- Complement: 202 crew plus 20 aviation
- Sensors & processing systems: 1 × EADS TRS-3D air search radar (three-dimensional); 1 × WM 25 combined surface search and fire control radar I/J band; 1 × Thales Nederland STIR 180 fire-control radar I/J/K band; 1 × Kelvin Hughes Nucleus 5000 I band navigation radar; 1 × STN Atlas DSQS-23BZ hull-mounted sonar
- Electronic warfare & decoys: ESM/ECM EADS FL 1800S; 2 × SCLAR decoys; SLQ-25 Nixie torpedo decoy
- Armament: Naval guns: 1 × OTO-Melara 76 mm dual-purpose gun; 2 × Mauser MLG27 27 mm autocannons; Antiaircraft warfare: 1 × 8-cell launch system, 16 × Sea Sparrow surface to air missiles; CIWS: 2 × MK 49 launcher, 21 × RAM each; Anti-ship missiles: 2 × quadruple Harpoon anti-ship missile launchers; Antisubmarine warfare: 2 × Mark 32 324-mm twin torpedo launchers, 8 × DM4A1 or Mark 46 torpedo
- Aircraft carried: Place for 2 Sea Lynx Mk.88A helicopters equipped with torpedoes, air-to-surface missiles Sea Skua, and/or heavy machine gun.

Bremen was a Bremen-class frigate of the German Navy. She was the lead ship of the class, and the second surface warship to serve with one of the navies of Germany to be named after the city of Bremen, in the state of Bremen. Her predecessor was the cruiser SMS Bremen of the Imperial German Navy, one of the Bremen class cruiser.

== Construction and commissioning ==
Bremen was laid down in July 1979 at the yards of Bremer Vulkan, Bremen and launched on 27 September 1979. Her sponsor was Christine Koschnick, wife of the then mayor of Bremen Hans Koschnick. After undergoing trials Bremen was commissioned on 7 May 1982. During her later career she was based at Wilhelmshaven as part of 4. Fregattengeschwader, forming a component of Einsatzflottille 2. Initially built with five-bladed Sulzer-Escher propellers, these were later replaced with seven-bladed ones from Wegemann & Company, making Bremen the fastest of her class. She was also the first warship in the navy to carry a helicopter.

== Service ==
Bremen participated in various international missions during her career. She was frequently deployed to participate in NATO permanent monitoring missions in the Mediterranean during the Gulf War in 1991. In late January 1992 she escorted the German freighter Godewind into Cartagena, Spain. The Godewind had been intercepted in the Mediterranean by the destroyer Mölders while transporting T-72 tanks from Poland to Syria without German permission. From 1992 to 1996 Bremen was active in the Adriatic Sea as part of NATO's Operation Sharp Guard, the maritime blockade of the former Yugoslavia during the Yugoslav Wars. From 2002 she served in the counter-terrorism Operation Enduring Freedom. In 2009 Bremen joined Operation Atalanta, the EU's anti-piracy mission off the Horn of Africa. On 14 August 2009 she deployed her helicopter to counter a pirate attack on the Turkish-flagged merchant ship MS Elgiznur Cebi. On encountering a pirate skiff and six pirates, the helicopter fired warning shots to force it to stop. The skiff was then seized by the Greek frigate Narvarinon, which found weapons and boarding ladders. In May 2012 Bremen was again deployed with Operation Atalanta, taking over from the replenishment oiler Berlin, in a ceremony attended by German Secretary of State Thomas Kossendey. Bremen was relieved from these duties in September 2012 by the Sachsen-class frigate Sachsen.

== Decommissioning ==
Bremen was removed from active service on 30 September 2013, and was decommissioned on 28 March 2014 at Wilhelmshaven by her final commander, Ingolf Schlobinsky. By this time she had been in service for 32 years, and had sailed over 1.5 million kilometres, under the command of 16 different captains. She was laid up in Wilhelmshaven as a source of spare parts for the remaining Bremen-class frigates in service. In mid-October Bremen left Wilhelmshaven in tow, for demolition at Aliağa, Turkey.
