= MV Hansa Stavanger =

German container ship

History
- Name: Hansa Stavanger
- Operator: Leonhardt & Blumberg Reederei
- Port of registry: Monrovia, Liberia
- Builder: Guangzhou Wenchong Shipyard, Guangzhou, People's Republic of China
- Yard number: 271
- Laid down: 18 July 1996
- Launched: 9 March 1997
- Completed: 29 September 1997
- In service: 1997–2013
- Renamed: Maersk Izmir (1998–1999); Maersk Gauteng (1999); Direct Condor (1999–2000); Hansa Stavanger (2000–2003); Cap Pasado (2003–2004); Lykes Trader (2004–2005); Hansa Stavanger (2005–2012); Pearl (2012–2013); VSM (2013)
- Identification: IMO number: 9128465; Call sign: A8UZ8; MMSI number: 636091967
- Fate: Scrapped 13 February 2013 at Alang, India.

General characteristics
- Type: Container ship
- Tonnage: 15,988 GT; 8,222 NT; 20,526 DWT
- Length: 170.17 m (558 ft 4 in)
- Beam: 24.80 m (81 ft 4 in)
- Draft: 10.85 m (35 ft 7 in)
- Depth: 14.20 m (46 ft 7 in)
- Ice class: GL ice class E Finnish-Swedish ice class II
- Installed power: MAN-B&W 6S60MC (12,240 kW)
- Propulsion: Single shaft; fixed pitch propeller
- Speed: 18 knots (33 km/h; 21 mph)
- Capacity: 1,550 TEU

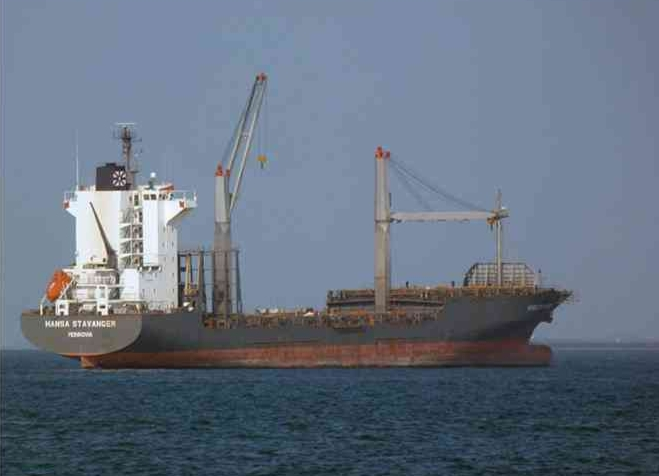
MV Hansa Stavanger

MV Hansa Stavanger was a German container ship. The owner of the ship was Schiffahrts-Gesellschaft MS "HANSA STAVANGER" Co. KG. The Hansa Stavanger was built in 1997 at Guangzhou Wenchong Shipyard in the Chinese city of Guangzhou. Her loading capacity is 20,526 GT & she could transport 1,550 containers on board. She was captured by Somali pirates on 4 April 2009. Around 1 May 2009, USS Boxer and a screen of German Navy warships assisted approximately 200 members of the German special police unit GSG-9 in approaching the hijacked ship. During the last phase of the operation, James L. Jones, the U.S. President's National Security Advisor, withheld final approval for the operation out of concern for the safety of the 25 sailors aboard the vessel. This led the German Federal Ministry of Defence to abort the planned attack on the freighter and the GSG-9 unit returned to their base of operations at the airport of Mombasa, Kenya.

Among the captured sailors held hostage were eleven Tuvaluans and one Fijian. A ransom of US$15 million had been demanded. The government of Tuvalu indicated it was incapable of paying, and expressed great concern for its citizens. On 3 August 2009 the ship was released after a ransom of US$2 million was paid, and was escorted into port in Mombasa, Kenya by the German frigates Brandenburg and Rheinland-Pfalz.

== Whereabouts of the ship ==
After hijacking, the vessel was later renamed to Pearl, reflagged from Liberia to Comoros & in January 2013 renamed again to VSM & beached at Alang, India on 13 February 2013.

== Literature ==
Kotiuk, Krzysztof (2010), Frohe Ostern Hansa Stavanger: 121 Tage in der Hand von Piraten (in German), Bielefeld: Delius Klasing, p. 219, ISBN 978-3-7688-3129-1
