= Karlsruhe Storm =

Lacrosse team in Karlsruhe, Germany

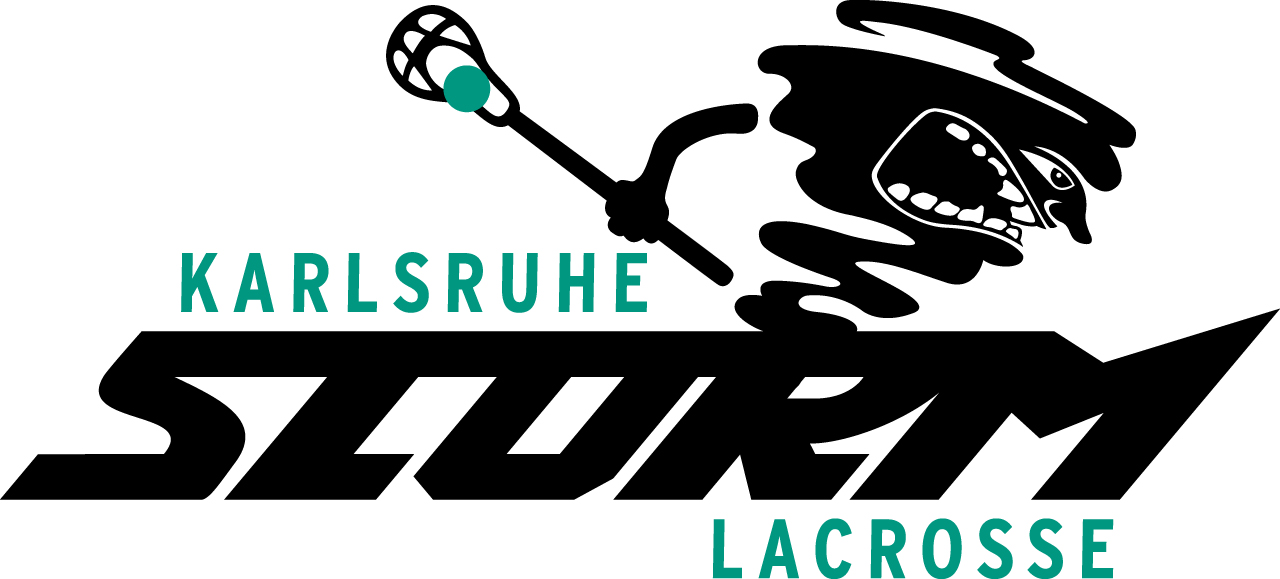
Karlsruhe Storm
Founded	2007
Field	KIT Kunstrasenplatz
Location	Karlsruhe, Germany
Team colors men	green/white
Team colors women	black/pink
League	Bundesliga South
Founders	Christian Herff; Johannes Kaschke; Birger Schmidt
Club	KIT SC

Karlsruhe Storm is a lacrosse team in Karlsruhe, Germany that was founded in 2007. It was originally a university team until October 2007, when the team transferred to the Club "Karlsruher SV". In 2010 the team joined the KIT SC, the sports club of the Karlsruhe Institute of Technology. Practice takes place on the Kunstrasen field on campus. The men's teams participate in the First Bundesliga South (Team White) and in the Landesliga Baden-Württemberg (Team Green). The women's team plays in the Bundesliga South.

== Accomplishments ==
- 2007/08: Together with Mannheim, Karlsruhe places 6th in the league
- 2008: Men's team places 5th at the Amsterdam Lowlands Tournament
- 2008: Men's team places 9th at the Kieler Lacrosse Meeting
- 2009: Men's team places 4th in the German Lacrosse Bundesliga Süd
- 2009: Men's team places 5th at the Amsterdam Lowlands Tournament
- 2009: Women's team plays first game ever at the Amsterdam Lowlands Tournament
- 2012: Men's Team White places 3rd in the First Bundesliga South
- 2012: Women's team places 4th in the Bundesliga South

== Women's Team "Black Storm" ==
The first practice took place in July 2008. In the first years, only a few girls participated in the training sessions. Since the team did not have a coach, the acquisition and improvement of lacrosse skills was guided by team members themselves. Through constant work and participation in tournaments and the Bundesliga South, not only the lacrosse skills augmented, but also the number of team members. Especially through the cooperation with the Karlsruhe Institute of Technology many new players joined the team. With growing experience and through the help of their new coach, the team improved its position in the league and reached the 4th place in the Bundeslige South in 2012. The team colors are black and pink, which is the reason for the women's team name "Black Storm". Every game starts and ends with the team members performing their team slogan "1,2,3 - Black Storm - Woohoo."

== Off-field ==
The team spirit is an essential element of Karlsruhe Storm. Monthly social events and other activities are an integral part of the team. Karlsruhe Storm is especially renowned for its lacrosse parties that take place every semester. These parties not only render the opportunity to celebrate with lacrosse team players and other students, but also to make lacrosse in Karlsruhe more popular.
