= German frigate Niedersachsen =

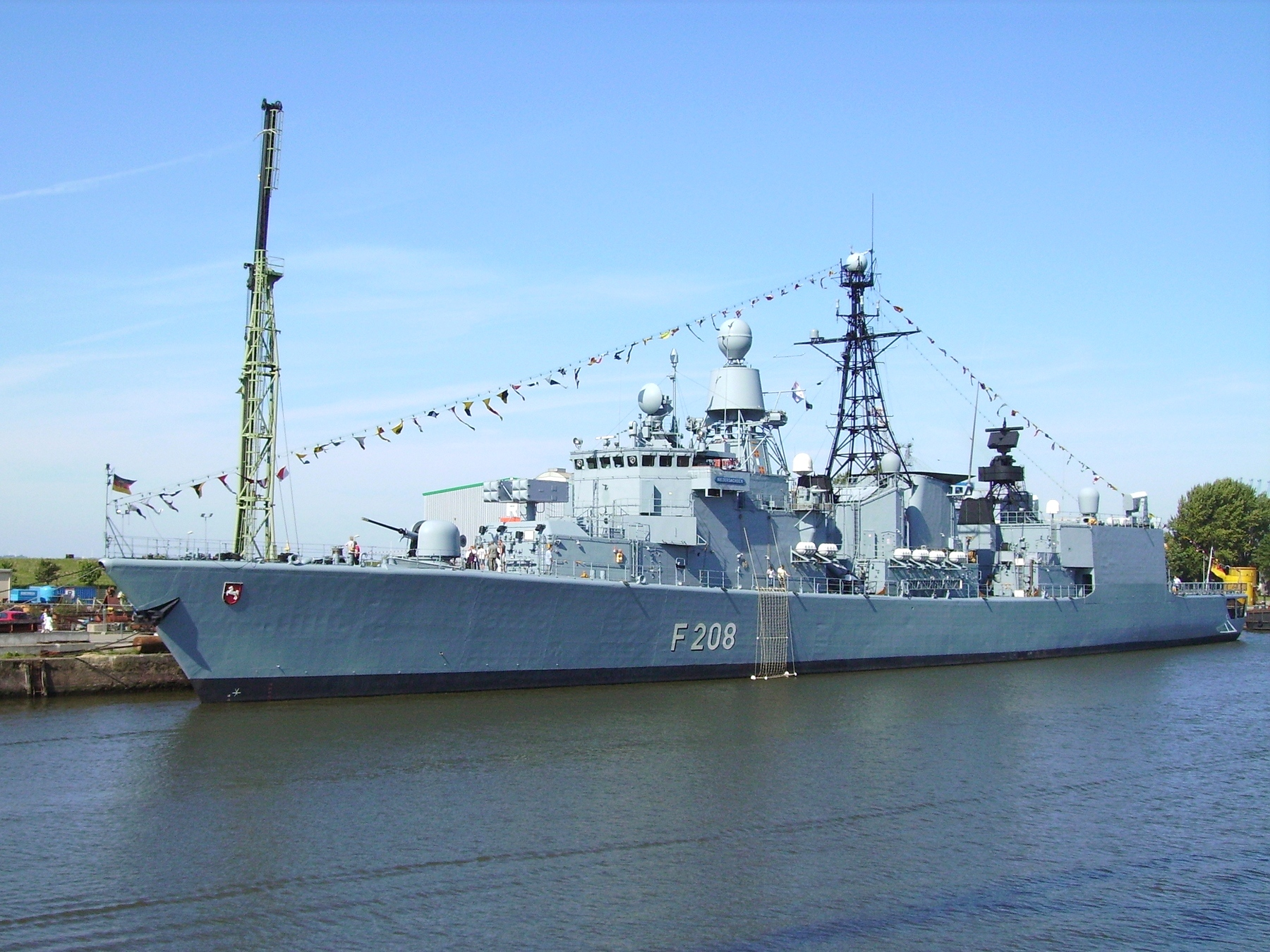
- Niedersachsen in 2008

History

Germany
- Name: Niedersachsen
- Builder: AG Weser, Bremen
- Laid down: 9 November 1979
- Launched: 9 June 1980
- Commissioned: 15 October 1982
- Decommissioned: 26 June 2015
- Identification: Pennant number: F208; MMSI number: 211210230; Call sign: DRAR
- Fate: Scrapped, 2021-22

General characteristics
- Class & type: Bremen-class frigate
- Displacement: 3,680 tonnes (3,620 long tons)
- Length: 130.50 m (428 ft 2 in)
- Beam: 14.60 m (47 ft 11 in)
- Draft: 6.30 m (20 ft 8 in)
- Installed power: CODOG (Combined diesel or gas); 2 × MTU 20V956 TB92 diesel engines, 8.14 MW (10,920 hp) total; 2 × General Electric LM2500 gas turbines, 38 MW (51,000 hp) total; 2 × Renk STG 150-50 gearboxes, 10:1 (diesel) and 720:47 (turbine); 4 × Deutz MWM diesel-generators, 750 kW (1,010 hp)
- Propulsion: 2 × propeller shafts, controllable pitch, five-bladed Sulzer-Escher propellers
- Speed: 30 knots (56 km/h)
- Range: more than 4,000 nmi (7,400 km) at 18 knots (33 km/h)
- Complement: 202 crew plus 20 aviation
- Sensors & processing systems: 1 × EADS TRS-3D air search radar (three-dimensional); 1 × WM 25 combined surface search and fire control radar I/J band; 1 × Thales Nederland STIR 180 fire-control radar I/J/K band; 1 × Kelvin Hughes Nucleus 5000 I band navigation radar; 1 × STN Atlas DSQS-23BZ hull-mounted sonar
- Electronic warfare & decoys: ESM/ECM EADS FL 1800S; 2 × SCLAR decoys; SLQ-25 Nixie torpedo decoy
- Armament: Naval guns: 1 × OTO-Melara 76 mm dual-purpose gun; 2 × Mauser MLG27 27 mm autocannons; Antiaircraft warfare: 1 × 8-cell launch system, 16 × Sea Sparrow surface to air missiles; CIWS: 2 × MK 49 launcher, 21 × RAM each; Anti-ship missiles: 2 × quadruple Harpoon anti-ship missile launchers; Antisubmarine warfare: 2 × Mark 32 324-mm twin torpedo launchers, 8 × DM4A1 or Mark 46 torpedo
- Aircraft carried: Place for 2 Sea Lynx Mk.88A helicopters equipped with torpedoes, air-to-surface missiles Sea Skua, and/or heavy machine gun.

Niedersachsen was a Bremen-class frigate of the German Navy. She was the second ship of the class, and the second surface warship to serve with one of the navies of Germany to be named after the state of Lower Saxony, German: Niedersachsen. Her predecessor was the minelayer Niedersachsen of the Kriegsmarine. The frigate entered service with the Bundesmarine in 1982, serving for 32 years until being decommissioned in 2015.

== Construction and commissioning ==
Niedersachsen was laid down in November 1979 at the yards of AG Weser, Bremen and launched on 9 June 1980. After undergoing trials Niedersachsen was commissioned on 15 October 1982. During her later career she was based at Wilhelmshaven as part of 4. Fregattengeschwader, forming a component of Einsatzflottille 2. Her sponsor was Adele Albrecht, wife of the then Prime Minister of Lower Saxony Ernst Albrecht.

== Service ==
Niedersachsen participated in various international missions during her career. In October 1989 she and the destroyer Rommel and the supply ship Coburg visited Leningrad, the first German navy ships to visit a Soviet/Russian port for 77 years. Niedersachsen was frequently deployed to participate in NATO permanent monitoring missions in the Mediterranean and Atlantic, including Standing Naval Force Atlantic (SNFL) and Standing Naval Force Mediterranean (SNFM) in 1992. In 1995 Niedersachsen took part in the British-organised Joint Maritime Course, and was again part of Standing Naval Force Mediterranean in 1997. In March 1997 she was ordered into Albanian waters as part of Operation Libelle, the German-led evacuation of foreign nationals as the Albanian unrest broke out. Niedersachsen operated off Durrës during the evacuation, using her radar to monitor Albanian airspace. Niedersachsen was again part of Standing Naval Force Atlantic in 2000 and 2004. She deployed in 2004 to participate in the NATO exercise Medshark/Majestic Eagle, and in 2007 was attached to the maritime component of the United Nations Interim Force in Lebanon.

From 8 January to 12 June 2008 Niedersachsen deployed with Standing NATO Maritime Group 2 in the Mediterranean Sea, conducting exercises and training sessions with Italian, Turkish, US, UK and Greek ships to promote international cooperation. In February she was also part of Operation Active Endeavour, the NATO anti-terrorist and anti-smuggling mission, off the Egyptian coast and in waters off Lebanon, Albania and southern Sardinia. During this time Niedersachsen visited 17 different ports in the Mediterranean, including Aksaz Naval Base and Antalya (Turkey), Haifa (Israel), Volos (Greece), Trieste, Palermo, Naples and Savona (Italy).

In 2011 Niedersachsen joined Operation Atalanta, the EU's anti-piracy mission off the Horn of Africa. On 20 April 2011 she carried out repairs to a disabled Yemeni dhow. On 10 June she detected a suspected Pirate Action Group (PAG), consisting of a fishing dhow and two attack skiffs, believed to have carried out a number of attacks on merchant vessels in the area. The Niedersachsen sank the two skiffs, after which the dhow returned to Somalia. Niedersachsen returned to Operation Atalanta in 2013. While patrolling off the Somali coast on 5 November 2013 she located a whaler towing a skiff, crewed by 10 men and carrying over 10 fuel barrels and 2 long ladders. When the Niedersachsen approached the suspect vessels, the men aboard the whaler threw the ladders overboard and returned to the shore. In 2014 she was again part of Standing NATO Maritime Group 2 and deployed in support of Operation Active Endeavour.

== Decommissioning ==
Niedersachsen was removed from active service in late December 2014, and decommissioned on 26 June 2015 after 32 years in service, in which she had covered 764,000 nautical miles. She was sold for scrapping to Turkey in 2021, and scrapped the following year.
