= Bremen-class frigate =

Frigate ship class

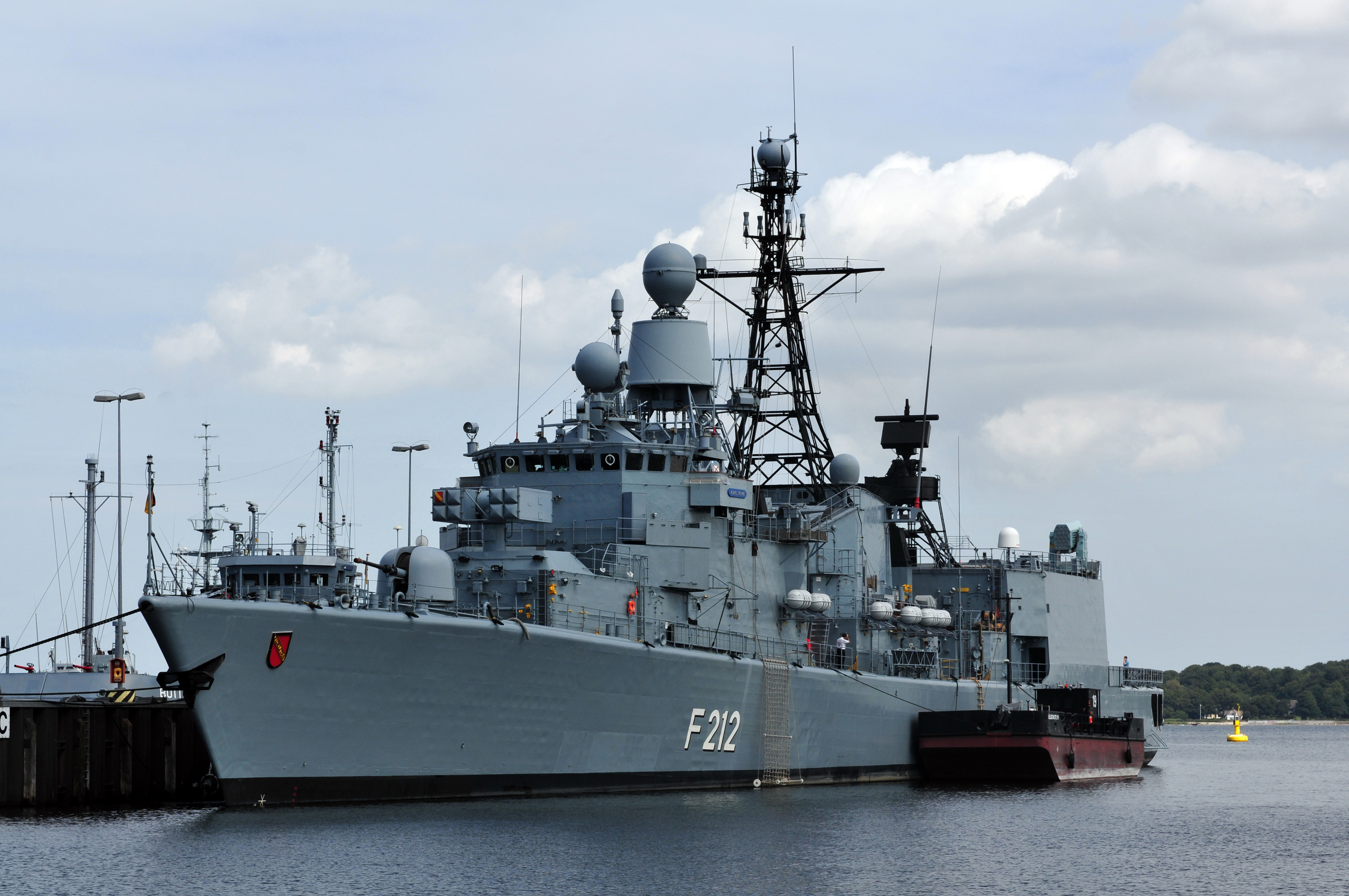
- Karlsruhe on 21 August 2013

Class overview
- Builders: Bremer Vulkan; AG Weser; Blohm + Voss; Nordseewerke; Howaldtswerke
- Operators: German Navy
- Preceded by: Köln class; Zerstörer 1 class
- Succeeded by: Baden-Württemberg class
- Built: 1979–1990
- In commission: 1982–2022
- Completed: 8
- Retired: 8

General characteristics
- Type: Frigate
- Displacement: 3,680 tonnes (3,620 long tons)
- Length: 130.50 m (428 ft 2 in)
- Beam: 14.60 m (47 ft 11 in)
- Draft: 6.30 m (20 ft 8 in)
- Installed power: CODOG (Combined diesel or gas); 2 × MTU 20V956 TB92 diesel engines, 8.14 MW (10,920 hp) total; 2 × General Electric LM2500 gas turbines, 38 MW (51,000 hp) total; 2 × Renk STG 150-50 gearboxes, 10:1 (diesel) and 720:47 (turbine); 4 × Deutz MWM diesel-generators, 750 kW (1,010 hp)
- Propulsion: 2 × propeller shafts, controllable pitch, five-bladed Sulzer-Escher propellers, later replaced with seven-bladed ones from Wegemann & Co. ("Bremen" only)
- Speed: 30 knots (56 km/h)
- Range: more than 4,000 nmi (7,400 km) at 18 knots (33 km/h)
- Complement: 202 crew plus 20 aviation
- Sensors & processing systems: 1 × EADS TRS-3D air search radar (three-dimensional); 1 × WM 25 combined surface search and fire control radar I/J band; 1 × Thales Nederland STIR 180 fire-control radar I/J/K band; 1 × Kelvin Hughes Nucleus 5000 I band navigation radar; 1 × STN Atlas DSQS-23BZ hull-mounted sonar
- Electronic warfare & decoys: ESM/ECM EADS FL 1800S; 2 × SCLAR decoys; SLQ-25 Nixie torpedo decoy
- Armament: Naval guns: 1 × OTO-Melara 76 mm dual-purpose gun; 2 × Mauser MLG27 27 mm autocannons; Antiaircraft warfare: 1 × 8-cell launch system, 16 × Sea Sparrow surface to air missiles; CIWS: 2 × MK 49 launcher, 21 × RAM each; Anti-ship missiles: 2 × quadruple Harpoon anti-ship missile launchers; Antisubmarine warfare: 2 × Mark 32 324-mm twin torpedo launchers, 8 × DM4A1 or Mark 46 torpedo
- Aircraft carried: Place for 2 Sea Lynx Mk.88A helicopters equipped with torpedoes, air-to-surface missiles Sea Skua, and/or heavy machine gun.

The eight F122 Bremen-class frigates of the German Navy was a series of frigates commissioned between 1982 and 1990. The design was based on the proven and robust Dutch Kortenaer class but used a different propulsion system and hangar lay-out. The ships were built for anti-submarine warfare as a primary task although they were not fitted with towed array sonars. They were also equipped for anti-surface warfare, while having anti-aircraft warfare point defences. The Bremen class frigates replaced both the Zerstörer 1 class destroyers and the Köln class frigates.

This class of ship was one of the last to be constructed under post-war displacement limitations imposed by the WEU on West Germany.

All eight Bremen-class frigates were replaced by the F125-class frigate. Prior to that the Bremen class served as the backbone of the German Navy.

== Employment ==
During the Cold War period, the ships' main war task was to escort convoys for reinforcement and resupply of allied forces in Europe in the Northern Atlantic. They frequently took part in NATO Standing Naval Forces. Since 1990, all ships have served in additional supporting missions such as the embargo operations against former Yugoslavia in the Adriatic Sea or Operation Enduring Freedom against the international terrorism.

During their lifetime, the ships' equipment has frequently been modernized and proven to be reliable platforms.

=== Notable actions ===
Karlsruhe successfully assisted an Egyptian freighter repel pirates on 25 December 2008 in the Gulf of Aden.

In 2012 Rheinland-Pfalz was reportedly used to gather intelligence on Syrian troop movements to be passed to the Free Syrian Army to assist in their attacks on the Syrian Army.

In December 2015 Augsburg joined the French aircraft carrier Charles de Gaulle in the south-eastern Mediterranean Sea to go to the Arabian Sea as part of the intervention against ISIS in the Syrian Civil War.

== Ships ==
Pennant	Name	Builder	Laid down	Launched	Commissioned	Decommissioned	Fate
F207	Bremen	Bremer Vulkan, Bremen	9 July 1979	27 September 1979	7 May 1982	28 March 2014	Scrapped, 2021
F208	Niedersachsen	AG Weser, Bremen	9 November 1979	9 June 1980	15 October 1982	26 June 2015	Scrapped, 2021-22
F209	Rheinland-Pfalz	Blohm + Voss, Hamburg	25 September 1979	3 September 1980	9 May 1983	22 March 2013	Scrapped, 2017
F210	Emden	Nordseewerke, Emden	23 June 1979	17 December 1980	7 October 1983	29 November 2013	Scrapped in Aliaga, Turkey, from 2021.
F211	Köln	Blohm + Voss, Hamburg	16 June 1980	29 May 1981	19 October 1984	31 July 2012	Scrapped, 2016-17
F212	Karlsruhe	Howaldtswerke, Kiel	10 March 1981	8 January 1982	19 April 1984	16 June 2017	Laid up in Kiel for blast tests
F213	Augsburg	Bremer Vulkan, Bremen	4 April 1987	17 September 1987	3 October 1989	30 June 2019	Laid up in Wilhelmshaven
F214	Lübeck	Nordseewerke, Emden	1 June 1987	15 October 1987	19 March 1990	15 December 2022	Laid up in Wilhelmshaven

All ships were based in Wilhelmshaven. Together they formed the 4. Fregattengeschwader (4th Frigate Squadron) of the German Navy.

== Gallery ==
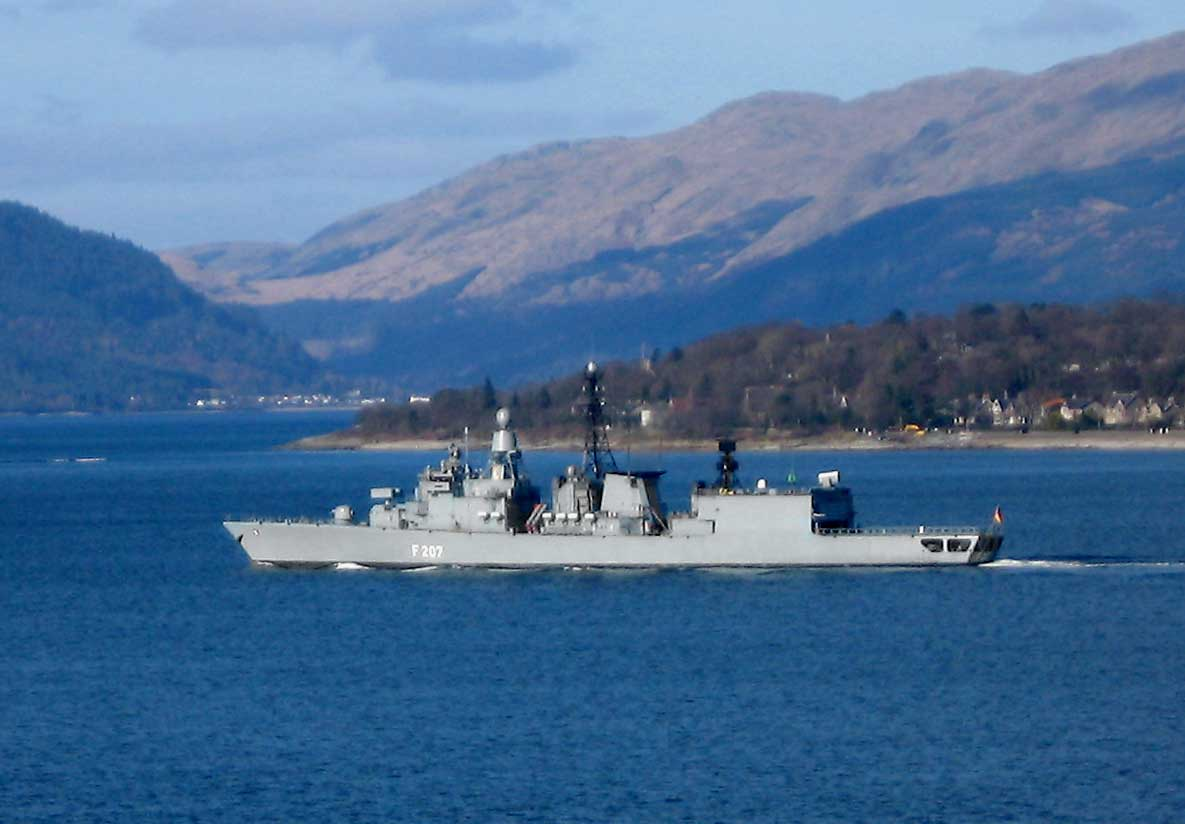
Bremen

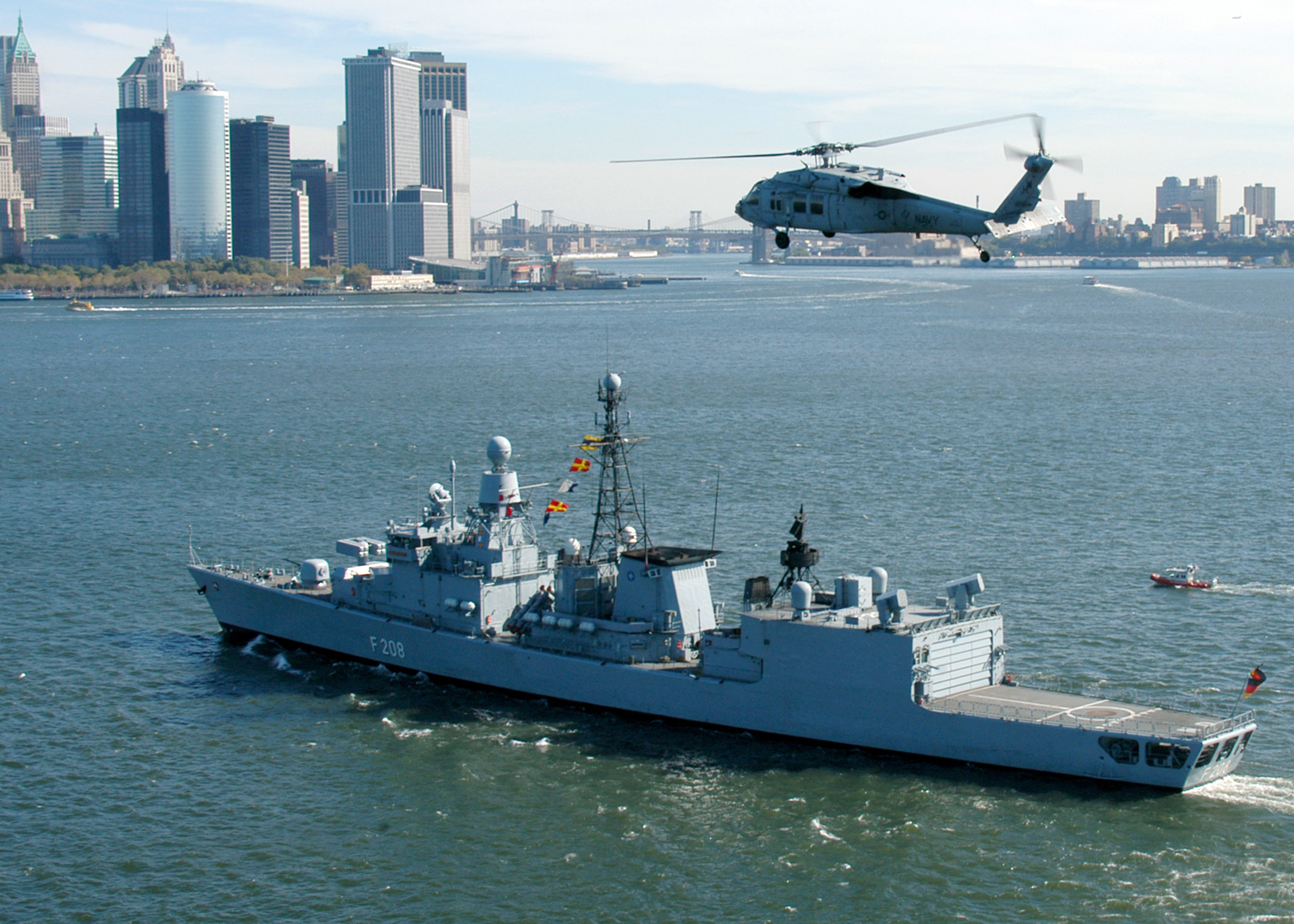
Niedersachsen at New York, 2004

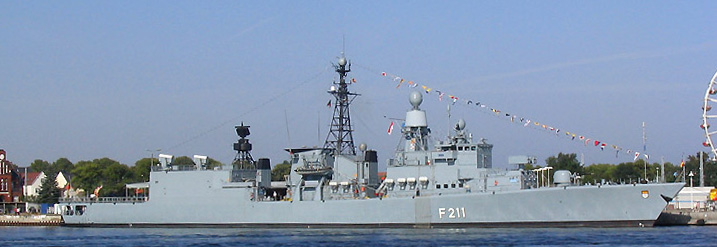
Köln

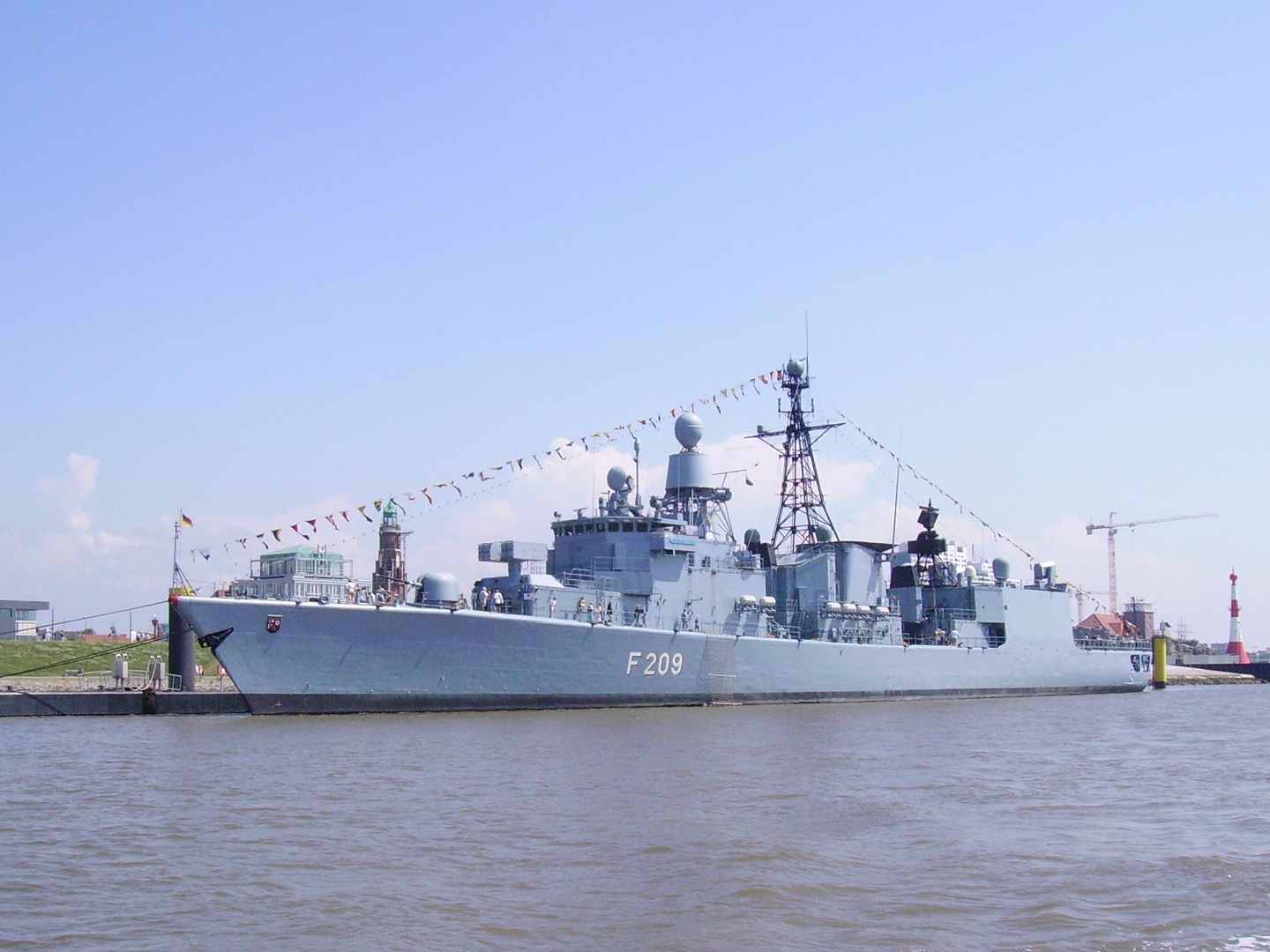
Rheinland-Pfalz

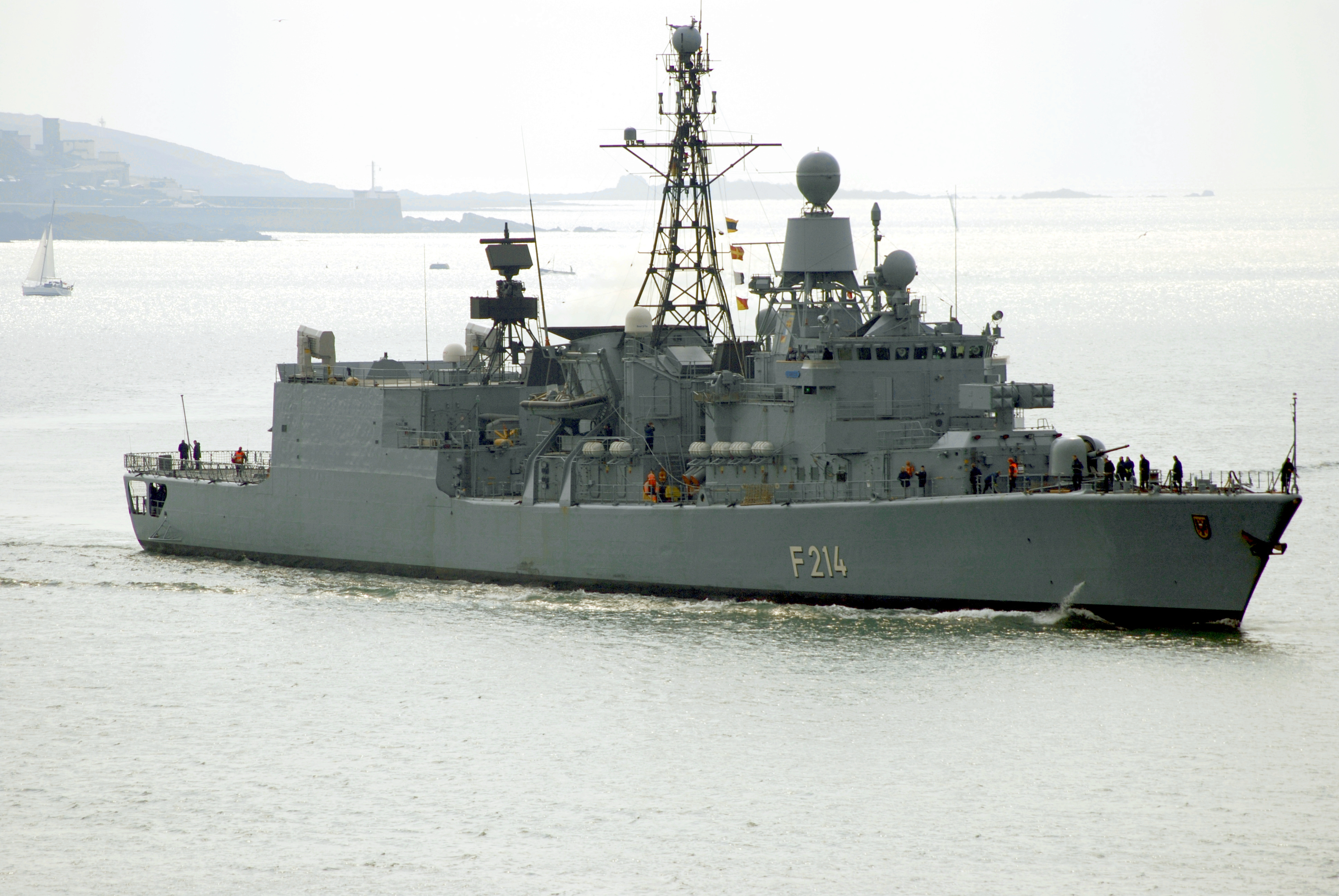
Lübeck

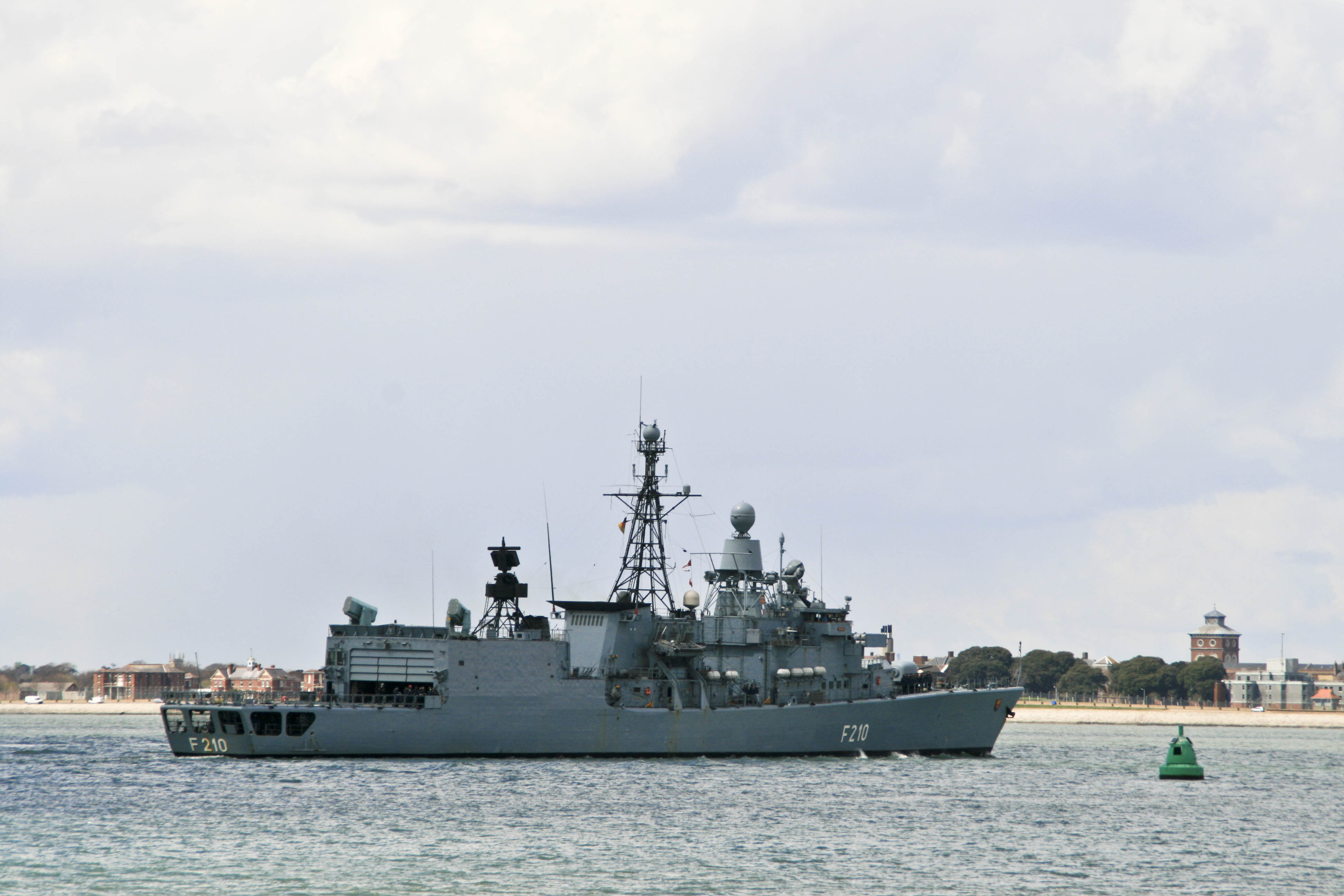
Emden at Portsmouth, UK, 2013

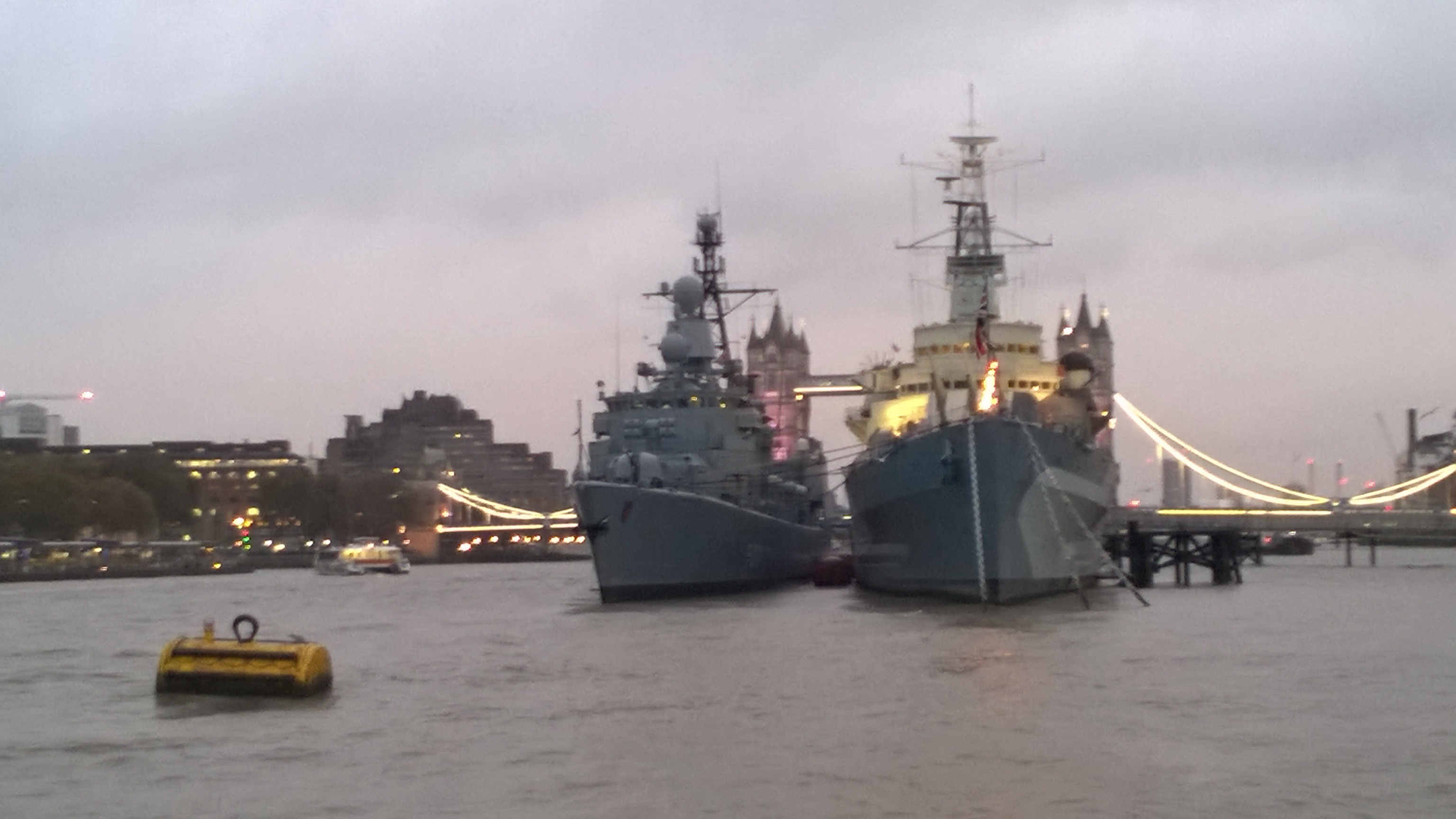
Karlsruhe at London, 2016

== See also ==
- List of frigate classes
- List of German Federal Navy ships
- List of naval ship classes of Germany

Equivalent frigates of the same era

- Kortenaer class
- Maestrale class
- Georges Leygues class
- Niterói class
- Krivak class
- Knox class
