= German corvette Karlsruhe =

Braunschweig-class corvette

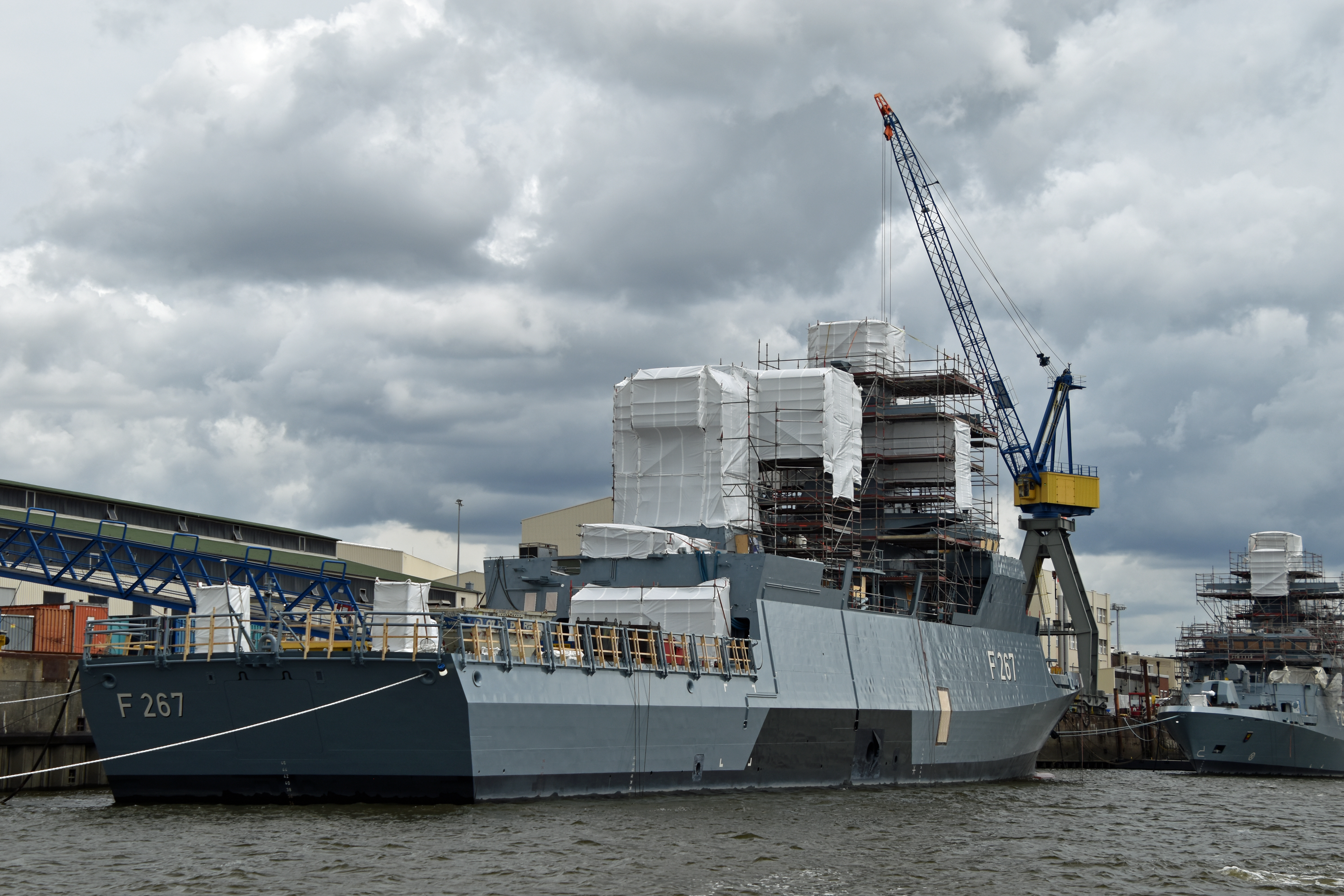
- Karlsruhe, still under construction, in the port of Hamburg, 2022

History

Germany
- Name: Karlsruhe
- Namesake: Karlsruhe
- Ordered: September 2017
- Builder: Lürssen-Werft, Bremen
- Cost: €400 million
- Laid down: 6 October 2020
- Launched: 4 May 2024
- Christened: 7 May 2024
- Commissioned: Expected, 2025
- Identification: Pennant number: F267
- Status: Outfitting

General characteristics
- Type: Braunschweig-class corvette
- Displacement: 1,840 tonnes (1,810 long tons)
- Length: 89.12 m (292 ft 5 in)
- Beam: 13.28 m (43 ft 7 in)
- Draft: 3.4 m (11 ft 2 in)
- Propulsion: 2 MTU 20V 1163 TB 93 diesel engines producing 14.8MW, driving two controllable-pitch propellers.
- Speed: 26 knots (48 km/h; 30 mph)
- Range: 4,000 nmi (7,400 km) at 15 kn (28 km/h; 17 mph)
- Endurance: 7 days; 21 days with tender
- Complement: 65 : 1 commander, 10 officers, 16 chief petty officers, 38 enlisted
- Sensors & processing systems: Cassidian TRS-3D multifunction Passive electronically scanned array C-Band radar; 2 navigation radars; MSSR 2000 i IFF system; MIRADOR electro-optical sensors; UL 5000 K ESM suite; Link 11 and Link 16 communications
- Electronic warfare & decoys: 2 × TKWA/MASS (Multi Ammunition Softkill System) decoy launcher; UL 5000 K ECM suite
- Armament: Guns; 1 × OTO Melara 76 mm gun; 2 × Mauser BK-27 autocannons; Anti-ship; 4 × RBS-15 Mk.3 anti-ship missiles; Close-In Weapon System: 2 × RAM Block II launchers, 21 missiles each; Mine laying capability; 2 mine racks of 34 naval mines Mk 12
- Aircraft carried: Helicopter pad and hangar for two Saab Skeldar

Karlsruhe (F267) is the eighth ship of the Braunschweig-class corvette of the German Navy.

== Developments ==
The K130 Braunschweig class (sometimes Korvette 130) is Germany's newest class of ocean-going corvettes. Five ships have replaced the Gepard-class fast attack craft of the German Navy.

They feature reduced radar and infrared signatures ("stealth" beyond the Sachsen-class frigates) and will be equipped with two helicopter UAVs for remote sensing. Recently, the German Navy ordered a first batch of two UMS Skeldar V-200 systems for the use on the Braunschweig-class corvettes. The hangar is too small for standard helicopters, but the pad is large enough for Sea Kings, Lynx, or NH-90s, the helicopters of the German Navy.

The German Navy has ordered the RBS-15 Mk4 in advance, which will be a future development of the Mk3 with increased range —400 km (250 mi)— and a dual seeker for increased resistance to electronic countermeasures. The RBS-15 Mk3 has the capability to engage land targets.

In October 2016 it was announced that a second batch of five more frigates is to be procured from 2022 to 2025. The decision was in response to NATO requirements expecting Germany to provide a total of four corvettes at the highest readiness level for littoral operations by 2018, and with only five corvettes just two can be provided.

In September 2017, the German Navy commissioned the construction of five more corvettes in a consortium of North German shipyards. Lürssen will be the main contractor in the production of the vessels. The contract is worth around 2 billion euros. In April 2018, the German government announced the specific arrangements under which the five new K130s would be built.

== Construction and career ==
Karlsruhe's construction started in 2020 and later laid down on 6 October 2020 by Lürssen-Werft in Bremen. In September 2022 it was reported that increasing difficulties in integrating the command and control systems for the Batch 2 ships had resulted in a cost growth of 401 million Euros and at least a two-year delay for the completion of the lead Batch 2 vessel, and potentially cascading delays for the next two ships in the Batch 2 program (including Karlsruhe) as well. The ship was christened in May 2024 in Hamburg, and has since begun its outfitting process.
