= German frigate Karlsruhe (F212) =

Bremen-class frigate

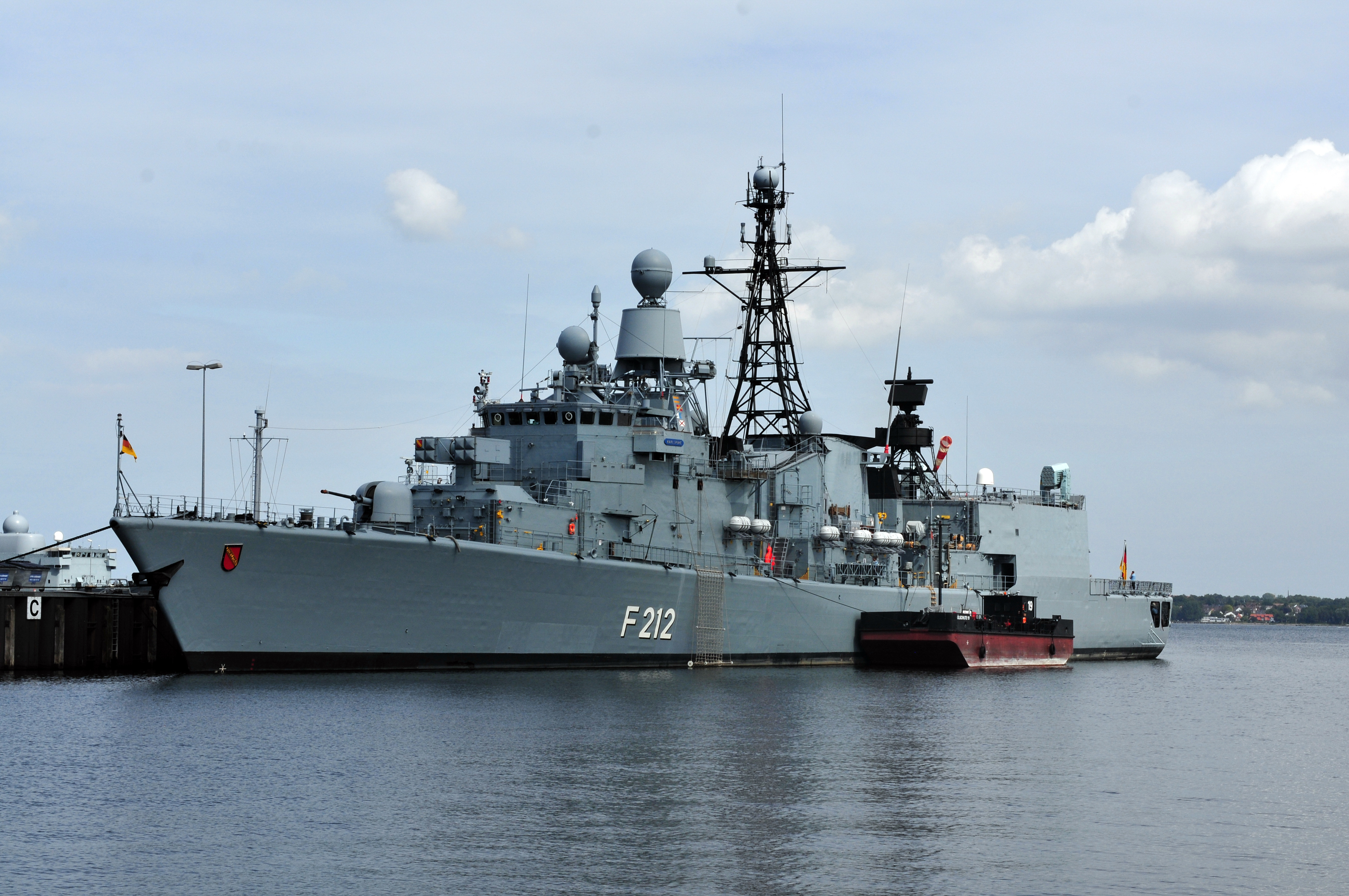
- Karlsruhe in Kiel in August 2013

History

Germany
- Name: Karlsruhe
- Builder: Howaldtswerke, Kiel
- Laid down: 10 March 1981
- Launched: 8 January 1982
- Commissioned: 19 April 1984
- Decommissioned: 16 June 2017
- Identification: Pennant number: F212; MMSI number: 211210270; Call sign: DRAV
- Status: Laid up, to be sunk.

General characteristics
- Class & type: Bremen-class frigate
- Displacement: 3,680 tonnes (3,620 long tons)
- Length: 130.50 m (428 ft 2 in)
- Beam: 14.60 m (47 ft 11 in)
- Draft: 6.30 m (20 ft 8 in)
- Installed power: CODOG (Combined diesel or gas); 2 × MTU 20V956 TB92 diesel engines, 8.14 MW (10,920 hp) total; 2 × General Electric LM2500 gas turbines, 38 MW (51,000 hp) total; 2 × Renk STG 150-50 gearboxes, 10:1 (diesel) and 720:47 (turbine); 4 × Deutz MWM diesel-generators, 750 kW (1,010 hp)
- Propulsion: 2 × propeller shafts, controllable pitch, five-bladed Sulzer-Escher propellers
- Speed: 30 knots (56 km/h)
- Range: more than 4,000 nmi (7,400 km) at 18 knots (33 km/h)
- Complement: 202 crew plus 20 aviation
- Sensors & processing systems: 1 × EADS TRS-3D air search radar (three-dimensional); 1 × WM 25 combined surface search and fire control radar I/J band; 1 × Thales Nederland STIR 180 fire-control radar I/J/K band; 1 × Kelvin Hughes Nucleus 5000 I band navigation radar; 1 × STN Atlas DSQS-23BZ hull-mounted sonar
- Electronic warfare & decoys: ESM/ECM EADS FL 1800S; 2 × SCLAR decoys; SLQ-25 Nixie torpedo decoy
- Armament: Naval guns: 1 × OTO-Melara 76 mm dual-purpose gun; 2 × Mauser MLG27 27 mm autocannons; Antiaircraft warfare: 1 × 8-cell launch system, 16 × Sea Sparrow surface to air missiles; CIWS: 2 × MK 49 launcher, 21 × RAM each; Anti-ship missiles: 2 × quadruple Harpoon anti-ship missile launchers; Antisubmarine warfare: 2 × Mark 32 324-mm twin torpedo launchers, 8 × DM4A1 or Mark 46 torpedo
- Aircraft carried: Place for 2 Sea Lynx Mk.88A helicopters equipped with torpedoes, air-to-surface missiles Sea Skua, and/or heavy machine gun.

Karlsruhe was a Bremen-class frigate of the German Navy. She was the sixth ship of the class to enter service, and the fifth ship to serve with one of the navies of Germany to be named after the city of Karlsruhe, in Baden-Württemberg. She is currently laid up, pending disposal as a trials and target ship.

== Construction and commissioning ==
Karlsruhe was laid down in March 1981 at the yards of Howaldtswerke, Kiel and launched on 8 January 1982. After undergoing trials Karlsruhe was commissioned on 19 April 1984. During her later career she was based at Wilhelmshaven as part of 4. Fregattengeschwader, forming a component of Einsatzflottille 2.

== Refits and roles ==
Karlsruhe, in common with the other ships of her class, underwent several refits and upgrades during her time in service. During her service in the Adriatic Sea in the mid-1990s she was temporarily equipped with the Goalkeeper CIWS, an air defence system. In 1995 she received the RIM-116 Rolling Airframe Missile system, and in 1998 was equipped with a new central computer and TRS 3D/32 radar antenna, replacing the DA 08 air and sea surveillance antenna. With the end of the Cold War the ship's role changed from being primarily convoy protection, submarine hunting, and general naval warfare, to include international peacekeeping and intervention missions.

== Service ==
After commissioning Karlsruhe participated in several international deployments. From August to December 1993 she was active in the Adriatic Sea as part of NATO's Operation Sharp Guard, the maritime blockade of the former Yugoslavia during the Yugoslav Wars. From February to April 1994 she deployed as part of Operation Southern Cross, the maritime element of Deutscher Unterstützungsverband Somalia, the German component of United Nations Operation in Somalia II. From December 1995 to April 1996 Karlsruhe was once more in service with Operation Sharp Guard.

From October 2001 to February 2002 Karlsruhe took part in Operation Active Endeavour, an anti-terrorism mission in the Eastern Mediterranean. This was followed by service in support of Operation Enduring Freedom – Horn of Africa, another anti-terrorism mission, from June to October 2002, and again from March to September 2005. Karlsruhe next deployment was as part of the United Nations Interim Force in Lebanon, from September 2006 to March 2007, followed by service in the Mediterranean and Middle East with Standing NATO Maritime Group 2 in 2008. Karlsruhe then took part in several deployments with Operation Atalanta, the EU's anti-piracy mission off the Horn of Africa. The first was from December 2008 to February 2009, followed by a second from August to December 2009, with a third and final deployment from November 2012 to April 2013.

From March to June 2016 Karlsruhe was part of Operation Sophia in the Mediterranean, during which time she rescued a total of 663 people from shipwrecks and other maritime incidents. Her final deployment was from June to September 2016, as flagship of Standing NATO Maritime Group 2. She handed over this duty to the Dutch frigate HNLMS De Ruyter on 1 September 2016. Karlsruhe returned to Wilhelmshaven on 16 December 2016, having spent 183 days on mission.

== Decommissioning and disposal ==
Karlsruhe was decommissioned on 16 June 2017 and handed over to Wehrtechnische Dienststelle 71, the navy's technical weapons research division, for use as a trial and target ship. After being fitted with sensors, she is slated for disposal in 2018 in a series of tests to determine the effects of various munitions and weapons, particularly those used in asymmetric warfare, such as smaller weapons and rockets currently used by terrorist and pirate groups in attacks. As of April 2018 Karlsruhe is moored at the naval arsenal in Kiel.
