= Ashok Khosla =

Indian environmentalist (born 1940)

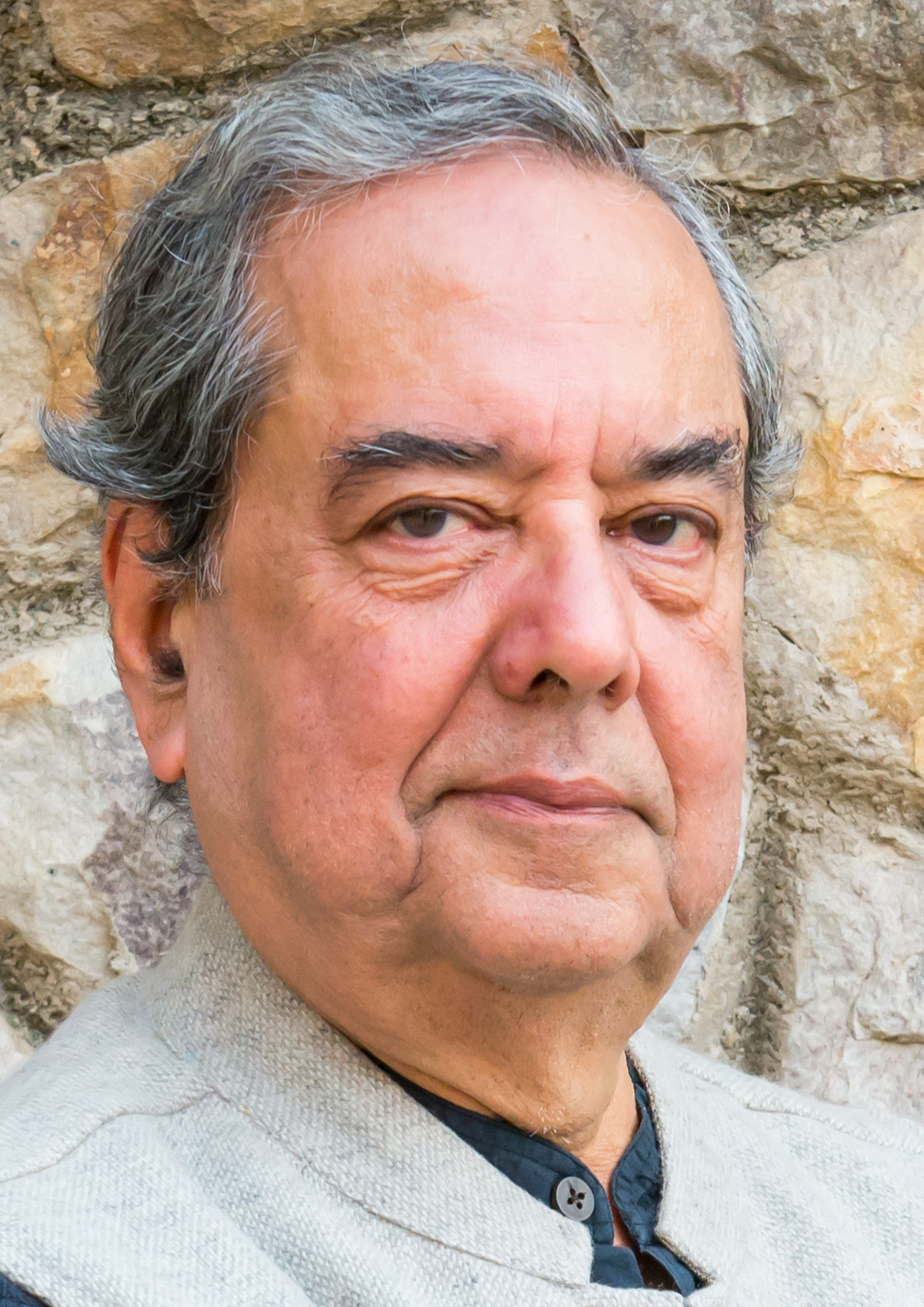
- Ashok Khosla, c. 2014
- Born: 31 March 1940 (age 86); Lahore, Punjab province, British India
- Education: Harvard University

Ashok Khosla is an Indian environmentalist currently based in Delhi. He received his PhD in experimental physics from Harvard University with a doctoral dissertation in the hyperfine structure of hydrogen halide isotopes. He is the co-chair of United Nations Environment Programme’s International Resource Panel (UNEP-IRP) and is internationally known for pioneering and contributing to sustainable development. He is recognized for popularizing the word and concept of "sustainability" in international forums. He was actively involved in various projects that defined the environmental views and activities of institutions such as UNEP, UNESCO, UNU, the U.S. Academy of Sciences, IUCN, and the ICSU/SCOPE. He was also the President of IUCN (2008 to 2012) and Club of Rome (2005 to 2012). Ashok Khosla is member of the World Future Council.

== Early life and education ==
Khosla was born in Lahore on 31 March 1940. His father was a university professor and diplomat, and his mother was a college lecturer. Khosla’s family moved to Delhi from Lahore in 1947 after the Partition of India. He pursued an M.A. in Natural Sciences from Peterhouse, Cambridge University. Additionally, he completed and received his PhD in experimental physics at Harvard University. In 1965, he helped design and taught the first undergraduate course on environment at the University as an assistant to Professor Roger Revelle.

== Career ==
Khosla was exposed to the issues of sustainable development during his time as a graduate student at Harvard University, while studying experimental physics. In 1964, Khosla met Professor Roger Revelle at the Population Center at Harvard. Revelle, who had been the head of the Scripps Institute of Oceanography and science advisor to President John F. Kennedy, was a pioneer in applying science to issues of social relevance. This was a meeting of minds and Khosla quickly became a student and collaborator of Professor Revelle. They worked together closely for over a decade exploring the relationships between people, their resources, and the environment. Khosla helped Revelle design and teach the groundbreaking undergraduate course, "Natural Sciences 118." This eventually led them to jointly publish The Survival Equation: Man, Resources, and His Environment which was the first definitive textbook on the subject.

At the time, much of the environmental literature available (for example, authors such as Paul Ehrlich and the Paddock Brothers) projected an apocalyptic future, whereas the message of The Survival Equation was one of hope. Its view was that while it is certainly true that forces and pressures to destroy the planet’s life support systems do exist, so does the knowledge to reorient the behaviour of economies and prevent this from happening. The course and the book itself had a considerable influence on the field of resource management and the environment. In fact, The Earth in Balance: Ecology and the Human Spirit , written by a student of the course, Al Gore, pays extensive homage to this course.

Upon completion of his PhD in experimental physics, Ashok was asked by the Government of India to establish the Office of Environmental Planning and Coordination (OEPC), the first national environmental agency in the Third World.

As director of the OEPC, he worked closely with Prime Minister Indira Gandhi, to introduce a broad range of methodological and institutional innovations necessary for managing environmental resources in a developing country such as India. These innovations included methods for assessing environmental impact and outcome, creating legal and institutional frameworks for pollution monitoring and control, managing the conservation of natural resources and wildlife, guidelines for the preservation of cultural heritage, and creating national institutions for research, training, and promoting awareness. Much of Khosla’s early effort was geared to what he called “strengthening the capacity” of public agencies and members of the civil society to bring about the changes needed to enhance environmental quality in the country.

At the time, Khosla was regarded as a pioneer in the emerging field of sustainable development not only in India, but at a variety of international platforms which had been set up to explore the implications of global-social phenomena. He was actively involved in various projects that defined the environmental views and activities of institutions such as UNEP, UNESCO, UNU, the US Academy of Sciences, IUCN and ICSU/SCOPE – each of which had their unique areas of action in a rapidly growing field. He was also a member of the small team that wrote the SCOPE 5 Monograph, the first definitive manual on environmental impact assessment. Khosla played an influential part in many of the early UNESCO Man and Biosphere and IUCN task forces.

== Achievements ==
Khosla identified and prepared the first three major environmental impact assessments in India: industrial pollution threats to the Taj Mahal, environmental impact of development projects at Chilka Lake, and impact assessment of a World Bank funded fertilizer plant in Nhava Sheva, Bombay (1973–1975).

He Formulated a detailed environmental management plan for the State of Jammu & Kashmir (1976) and guidelines for its implementation and established primary funding programmes for the Indian Government to support environmental research, environmental awareness and environmental action in India (1975–1976)

He promoted a large network of NGOs and community-based organizations interested in environmental issues, particularly in rural India and was responsible for introducing many key environmental issues relevant to the third world to an international community playing a key role in expanding the scope of interest and action for international organizations, as well as introducing them to various tools with which to address these issues.

In 1976, Ashok Khosla joined the United Nations Environment Programme (at its new headquarters in Nairobi, Kenya) as the first Director of Infoterra. His primary task was to design and implement a global information system for sustainable development that would facilitate governments and international agencies to introduce environmental agendas into national decision-making. At UNEP, he was also responsible for many other activities, such as setting up the MIS, designing project approval procedures and contributing to various publications like the State of Environmental Reports.

Ashok Khosla's main achievements at UNEP included the design and implementation of INFOTERRA, the global information system of the United Nations Environment Programme (UNEP); building up an active network of more than 10,000 environmental organizations extending over 120 countries (1976–1982) and creating strong working links between UNEP and leading NGOs throughout the world.

He was also responsible for making internal UNEP programmes more effective and efficient, as well as preparing policy papers on key issues such as the impact of consumption patterns and lifestyles on the environment and made a major contribution to the World Conservation Strategy, a defining moment in the promotion of sustainable development (1980).

=== Development alternatives ===
In 1983, Ashok set up Development Alternatives (DA), made possible by a $100,000 project grant from UNEP. Ashok's vision for DA was to create an organization that would make good business out of delivering environmentally sound development.

Recognizing that 70% of the people of India lived in villages, the organization felt that the bulk of the actions of industry and civil society must be aimed at their needs. As a result, it combined the objectives of a civil society organization with the profit orientation (and management discipline) of a private sector business, DA (though itself a not-for-profit entity). This created a fundamentally new niche in the Indian economy for a whole new breed of organization, which can meet social objectives in a scalable and sustainable manner. Such organizations are now known as the Social Enterprises.

DA’s major concerns lie with the environment (specifically, the interaction of people with nature), technology (interaction of people with machines), and institutions and policies (interaction of people with people). DA has demonstrated that humankind's choice of technologies, the existing design of our institutions, consumption patterns, and production systems must be fundamentally transformed if we want to ensure Earth's long-term ecological security.

Furthermore, technologies have to be more human in scale, less wasteful in resources, and directly responsive to the basic needs of people. In a developing country, such as India, where economic and social disparities in society are large, the poor tend to overutilize and destroy renewable resources out of the exigencies of survival and need. On the other hand, the rich tend to overutilize and destroy other kinds of resources, such as non-renewable resources, often out of greed. Thus, only by increasing social equity, and eradicating poverty, can humankind make an impact on environmental conservation and reduce the threats to the resource base.

== Recognition ==
Khosla's contribution to the field of sustainability has been recognized and lauded through various awards:

- UN Sasakawa Environment Prize
- Zayed International Environment Prize
- WWF Duke of Edinburgh Medal
- Officer of the Order of the British Empire (OBE)
- Schwab Foundation Outstanding Social Entrepreneur
- Stockholm Challenge Award
- Global 500 Roll of Honour of the United Nations Environment Programme
- The Golden Ark of the Netherlands

=== Publications ===
- More than 300 professional papers, articles and reports
- Honorary doctorate from Simon Fraser University (British Columbia, Canada) in June 2018

== Criticism ==
He was accused of aligning with the South Korean government and Samsung about the construction of the Jeju Naval Base in Jeju Island in the last moments of his presiding the IUCN.
