= Minhwi Lee =

South Korean indie rock musician

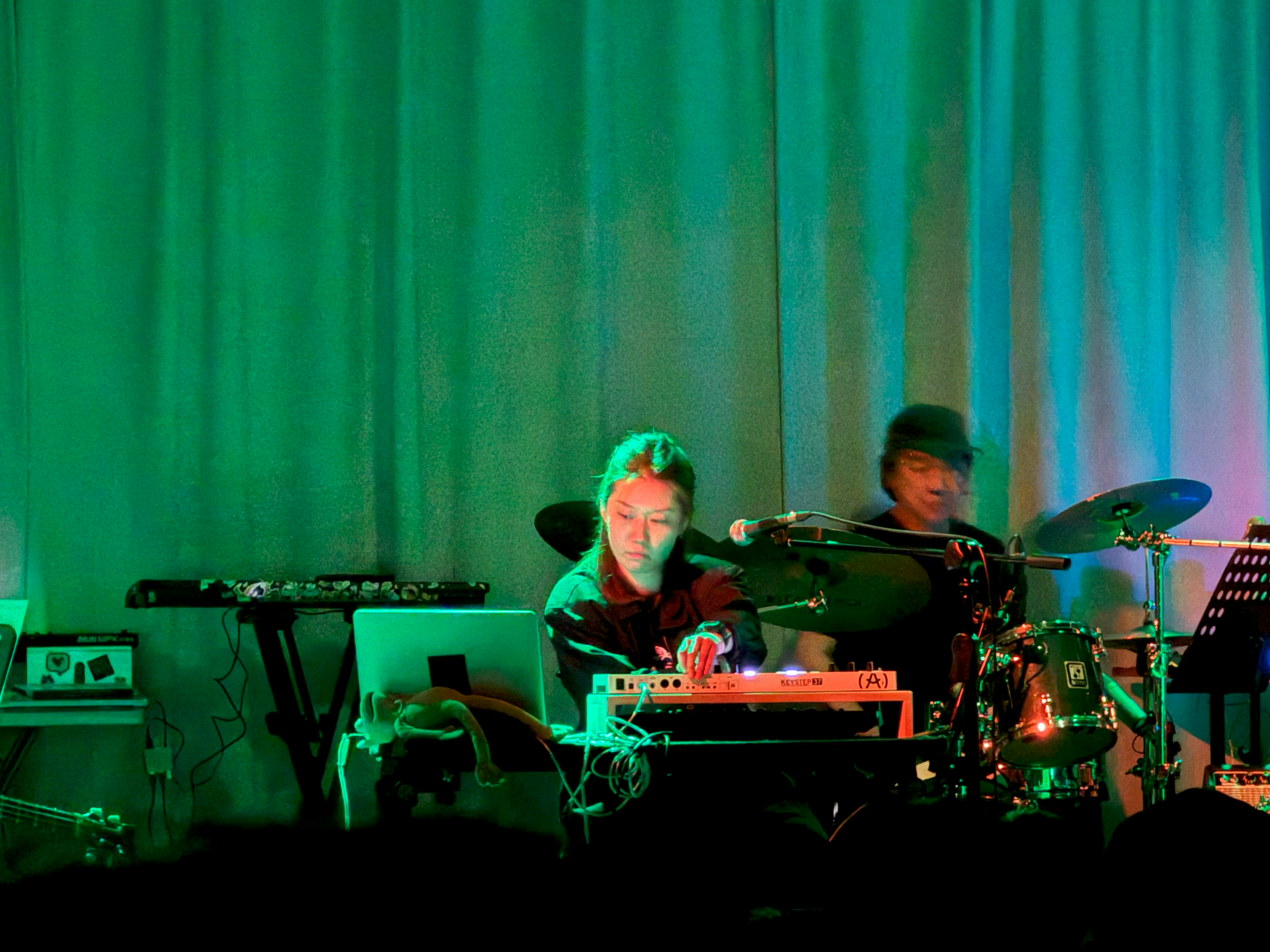
- Lee in 2023

Background information
- Also known as: Mansu
- Born: 1989 (age 36–37)
- Origin: Anyang, Gyeonggi, South Korea
- Genres: Contemporary folk
- Years active: 2011–present
- Member of: Gawthrop; Sam-seung
- Formerly of: Mukimukimanmansu
- Website: minhwi.kr

Minhwi Lee (Korean: 이민휘; born 1989) is a South Korean contemporary folk singer-songwriter and composer. She debuted as a member of indie band Mukimukimanmansu under the name Mansu (Korean: 만수) in 2011, and released her first solo album Borrowed Tongue (빌린 입) in 2016. The album was awarded The Best Folk Album at the 2017 Korean Music Awards. In 2023, she released her second album Hometown to Come (미래의 고향).

== Career ==
Minhwi Lee was born in Anyang, Gyeonggi in 1989. She graduated from the Korea National University of Arts, and made her debut in 2011 as a member of the indie duo Mukimukimanmansu under the stage name Mansu. The band's music gained huge popularity as a meme due to its unique style, and released a studio album 2012. The band was disbanded in May 2013.

Minhwi Lee produced the soundtrack for A Midsummer's Fantasia in 2015. Her first solo studio album, Borrowed Tongue (빌린 입), was released in 2016. The album was awarded The Best Folk Album at the 2017 Korean Music Awards. She majored film score at New York University and Conservatoire National Supérieur de Musique et de Danse de Paris. She produced a variety of film score, including Family in the Bubble (2017) and Vestige (2022), as well as drama soundtracks such as One Day Off (2023).

In 2020, she formed the group Sam-seung with Seo Kyungsoo and Choi Kyeongjoo, and released the studio album Imaginary Scheme (상상도). In November 2023, she released her second studio album Hometown to Come (미래의 고향).

== Discography ==
=== Solo studio albums ===
- Borrowed Tongue (빌린 입) (2016)
- Hometown to Come (미래의 고향) (2023)

=== Mukimukimanmansu ===
- 2012 (2012)

=== Sam-seung ===
- Imaginary Scheme (상상도) (2012)
