= Hometown to Come =

Studio album by Minhwi Lee
- Released: 17 November 2023
- Genre: Contemporary folk
- Length: 32:28
- Label: Mirrorball Music
- Producer: Minhwi Lee

Minhwi Lee chronology
Music for Hwi-i-ing (2023)	Hometown to Come (2023)

Hometown to Come (Korean: 미래의 고향; RR: Miraeeui gohyang) is the second studio album by South Korean singer-songwriter Minhwi Lee. The album was released on 17 November 2023.

== Background ==
Hometown to Come was released 7 years after the release of her debut studio album Borrowed Tongue. She said that she recorded the album based on her feelings when she returned to Korea after 5 years of living abroad, and that she recorded the album under the theme of "the absence of hometown."

== Critical reception ==
Professional ratings
Review scores
Source	Rating
Pitchfork	7.6/10

Music critic Seojeongmingab reviewed "Hometown to Come encompasses the past, present, and future, bringing ghostly people and asking questions." Lee Arim of Music Y described the album's track Hometown to Come as "It is an attractive song with an elegant yet bizarre voice with Minhwi Lee's voice, which is reminiscent of strings and jazz, starting with a guitar melody with a minor chord." James Gui of Pitchfork compared the album's tracks to that of Françoise Hardy, and described the album as "If Borrowed Tongue questioned our ability to connect with one another, Hometown to Come suggests that it’s the only way forward."

== Track listing ==
No.	Title	Length
1.	"Blue Flower" ("푸른 꽃")	2:58
2.	"The Station" ("정거장")	3:58
3.	"Returning" ("귀향")	4:35
4.	"Mirror Therapy for Phantom Pain" ("환상통의 거울 치료")	2:58
5.	"Lost Land" ("무대륙")	5:23
6.	"Penitentiary" ("감화원")	3:32
7.	"Mother's Mother" ("어머니의 어머니")	3:05
8.	"Hometown to Come" ("미래의 고향")	5:59
