= ROKS Gang Gam-chan =

Chungmugong Yi Sun-sin-class destroyer

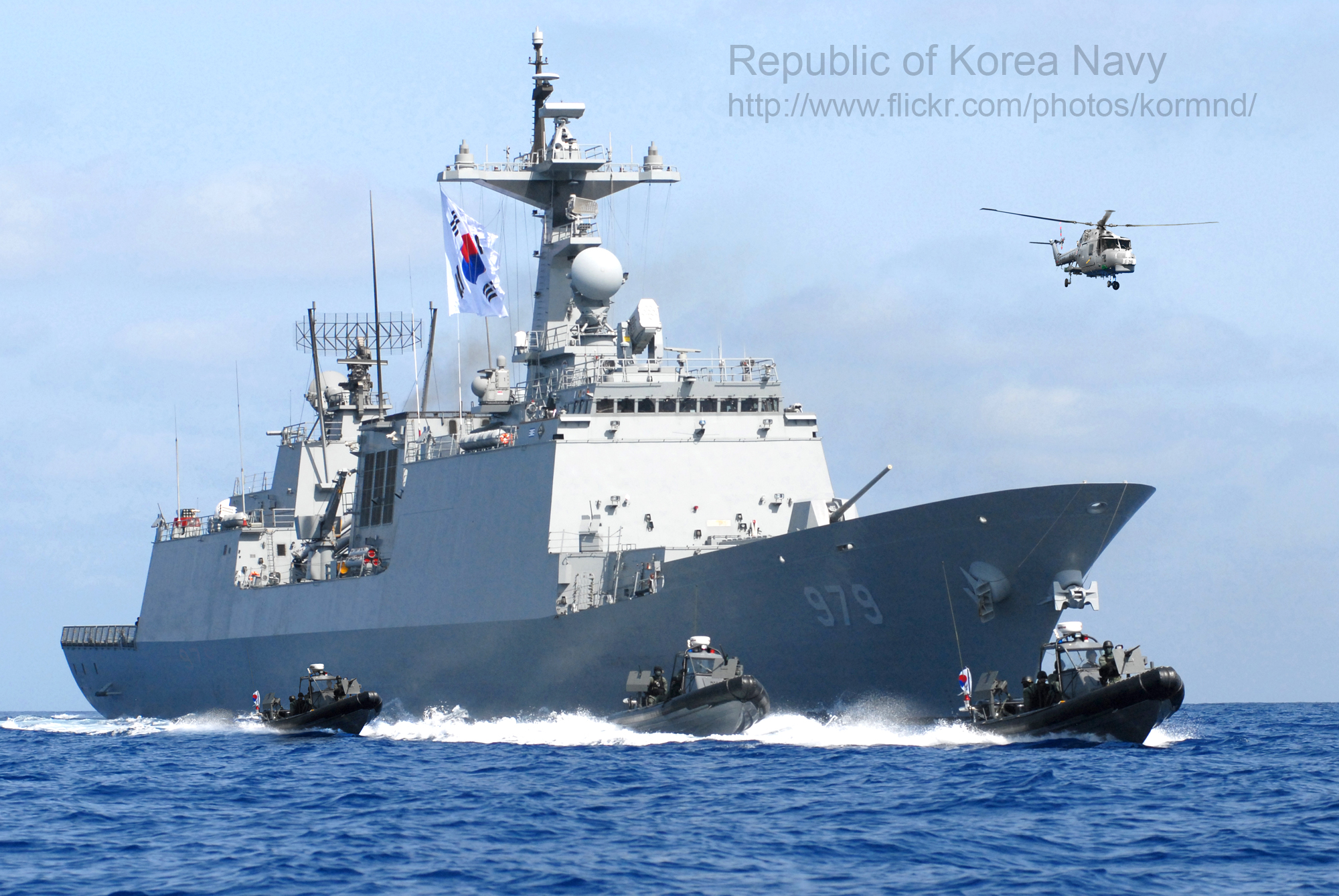
- ROKS Gang Gam-chan on 16 April 2010.

History

South Korea
- Name: Gang Gam-chan; (강감찬)
- Namesake: Gang Gam-chan
- Builder: DSME
- Launched: 16 March 2006
- Commissioned: 1 October 2007
- Identification: Pennant number: DDH-979
- Status: Active

General characteristics
- Class & type: Chungmugong Yi Sun-sin-class destroyer
- Displacement: 4,800 t (4,700 long tons) standard; 5,000 t (4,900 long tons) full load
- Length: 150 m (492 ft 2 in)
- Beam: 17 m (55 ft 9 in)
- Propulsion: Combined diesel or gas
- Speed: 30 knots (56 km/h; 35 mph)
- Complement: 200
- Armament: 1 x 5"/54 caliber Mark 45 gun; 1 x Goalkeeper CIWS; 56 x Vertical launching system; 21 x RIM-116 Rolling Airframe Missile; 8 x RGM-84 Harpoon; 2 x triple K745 Blue Shark Torpedo

ROKS Gang Gam-chan (DDH-979) is a Chungmugong Yi Sun-sin-class destroyer in the Republic of Korea Navy. She is named after Gang Gam-chan.

== Design ==
The KDX-II is part of a much larger build up program aimed at turning the ROKN into a blue-water navy. It is said to be the first stealthy major combatant in the ROKN and was designed to significantly increase the ROKN's capabilities.

== Construction and career ==
ROKS Gang Gam-chan was launched on 16 March 2006 by Daewoo Shipbuilding and commissioned on 1 October 2007.

Gang Gam-chan participated in the anti-piracy operations off Somalia alongside European Union Naval Force (EU NAVFOR) on March 26, 2014.

ROKS Gang Gam-chan has been sent on patrol duty to Gulf of Aden on 13 August 2019. She is in the Navy's anti-piracy Cheonghae Unit.

On 22 April 2025, Gang Gam-chan arrived at the Port of Colombo, Sri Lanka on a replenishment visit. The vessel departed the island on 24 April.

The ship departed the Jeju Naval Base on 30 January 2026 to participate in the International Fleet Review 2026 and Exercise MILAN 2026 hosted by the Indian Navy at Visakhapatnam. This is the second instance of a ROKS Navy ship participating in the MILAN exercise. ROKS Gwangju (FFG-817) was the first to participate in the exercise in 2022.

== Gallery ==
ROKS Gang Gam-chan Gallery

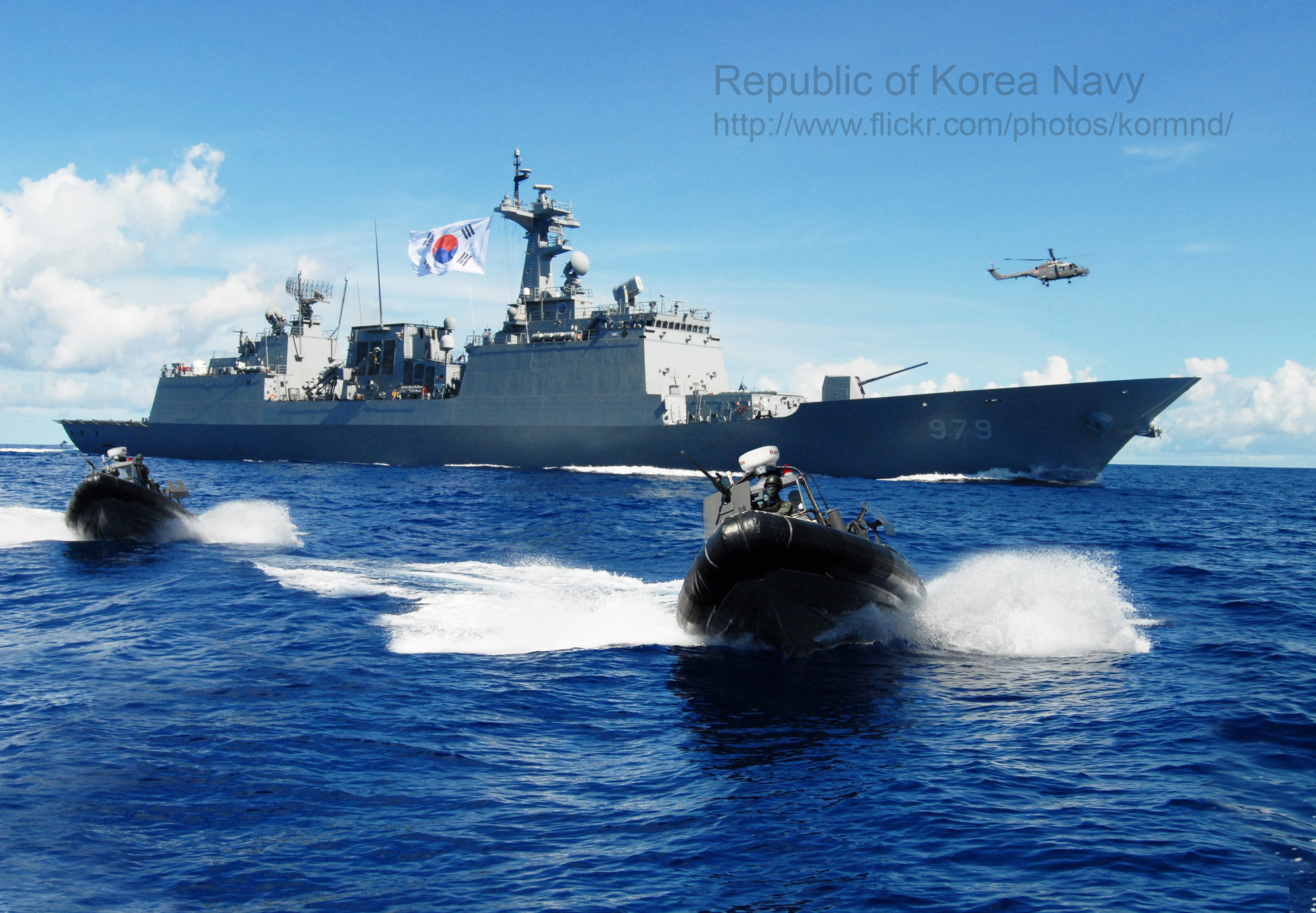
ROKS Gang Gam-chan in the Cheonghae Unit.

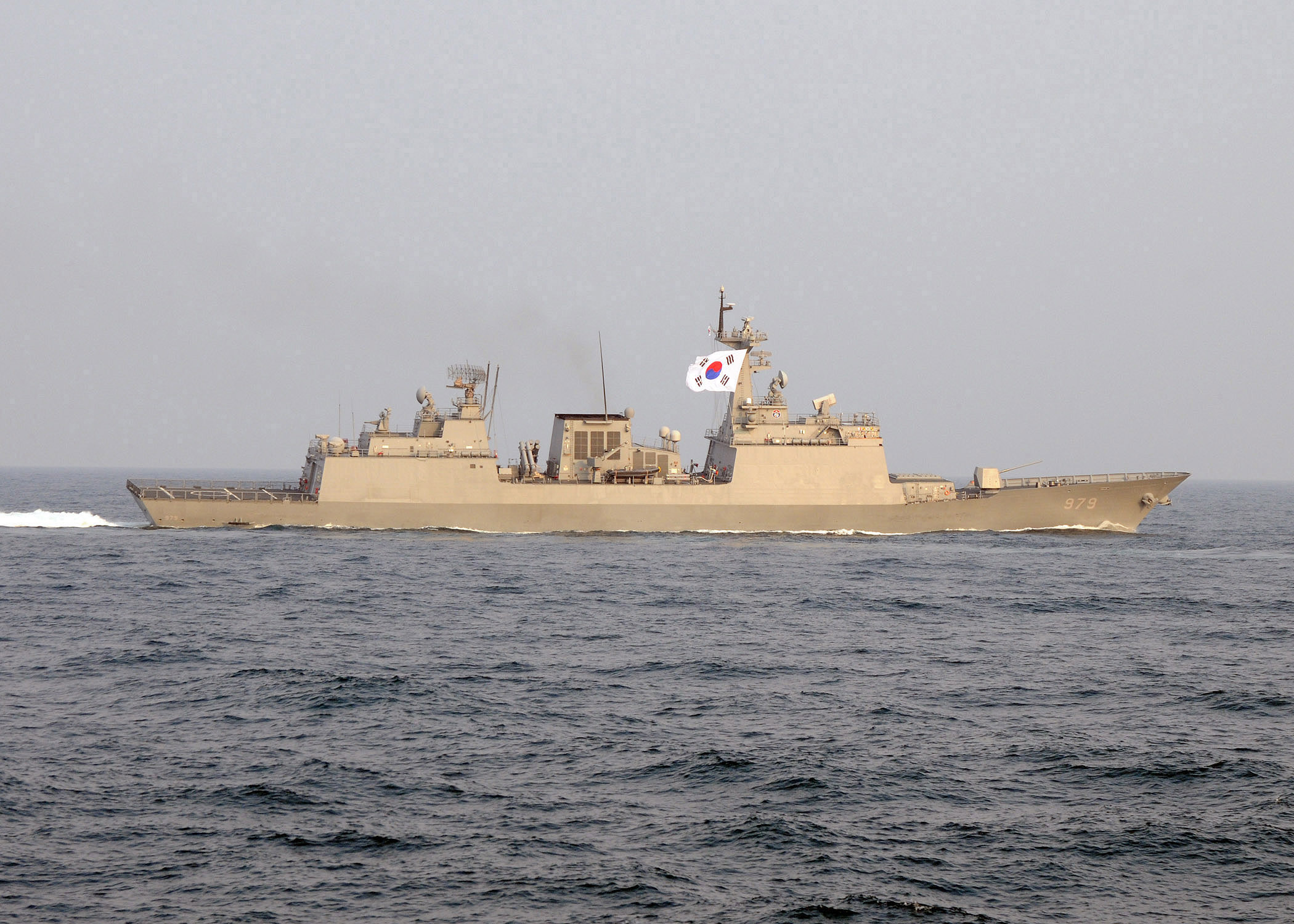
ROKS Gang Gam-chan underway in the Pacific Ocean on 13 October 2009.

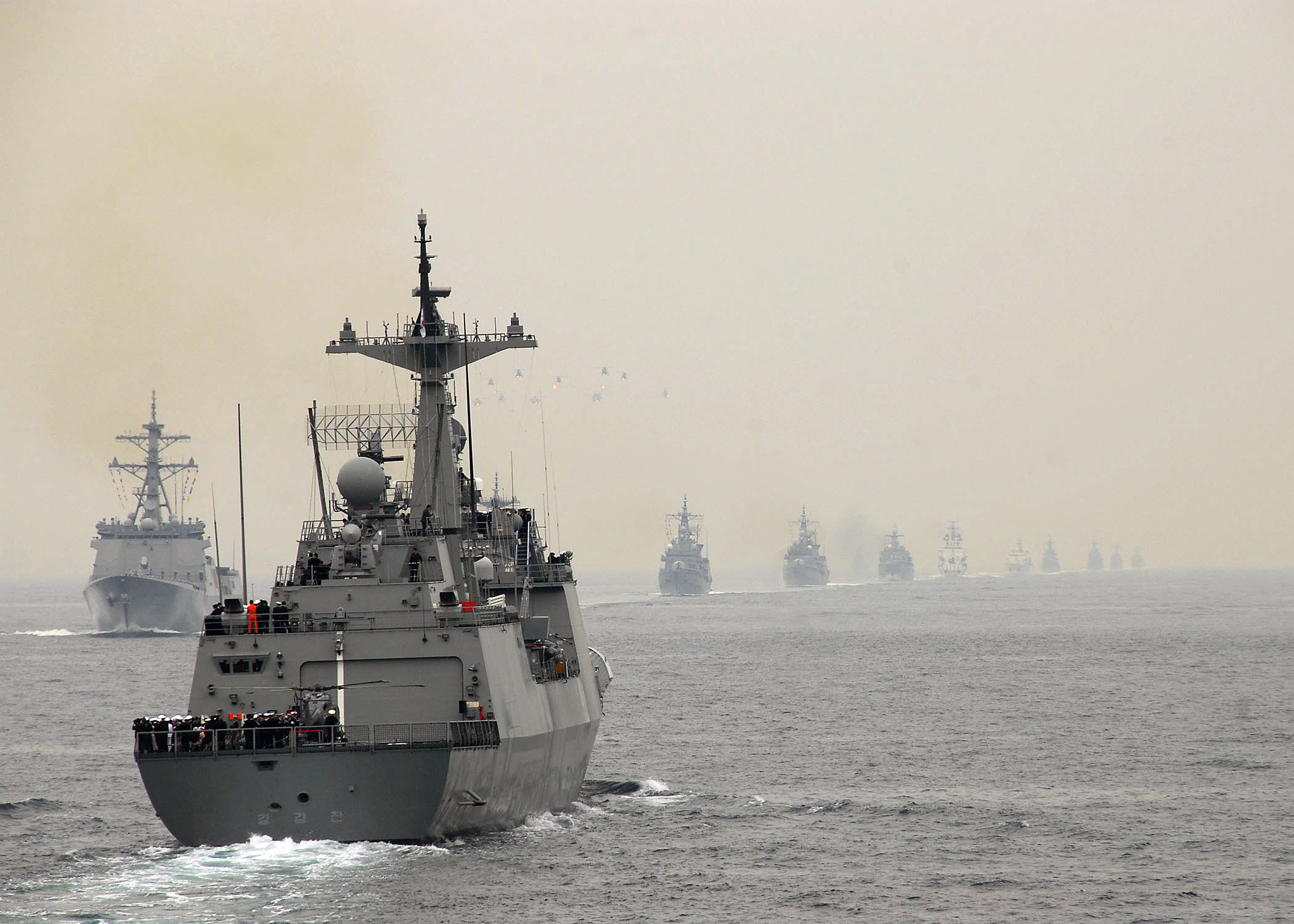
ROKS Gang Gam-chan on 7 October 2008 during International Fleet Review.

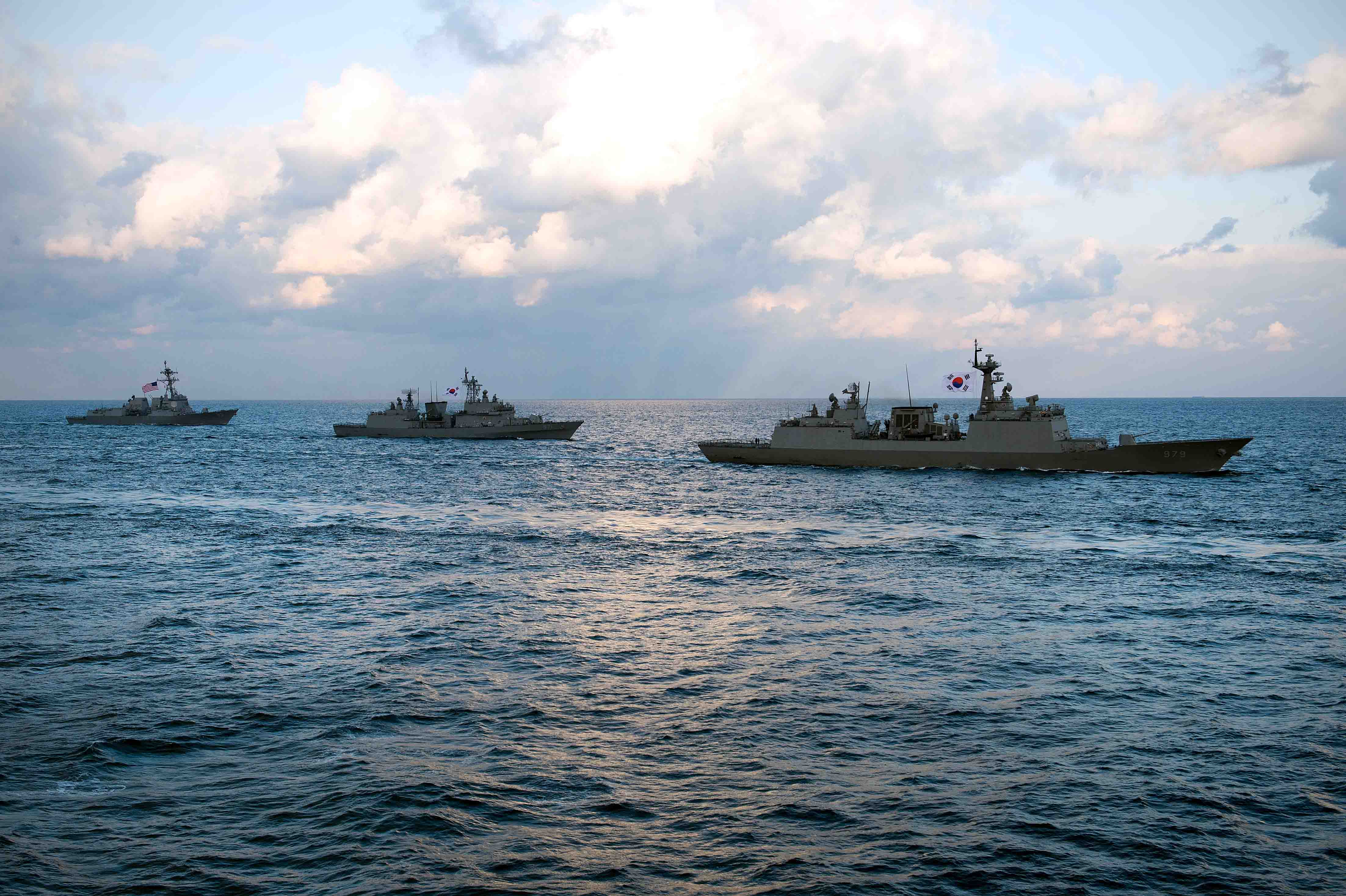
ROKS Gang Gam-chan, ROKS Gwanggaeto the Great and USS Chung Hoon in formation during Foal Eagle 2016 on 24 March 2016.

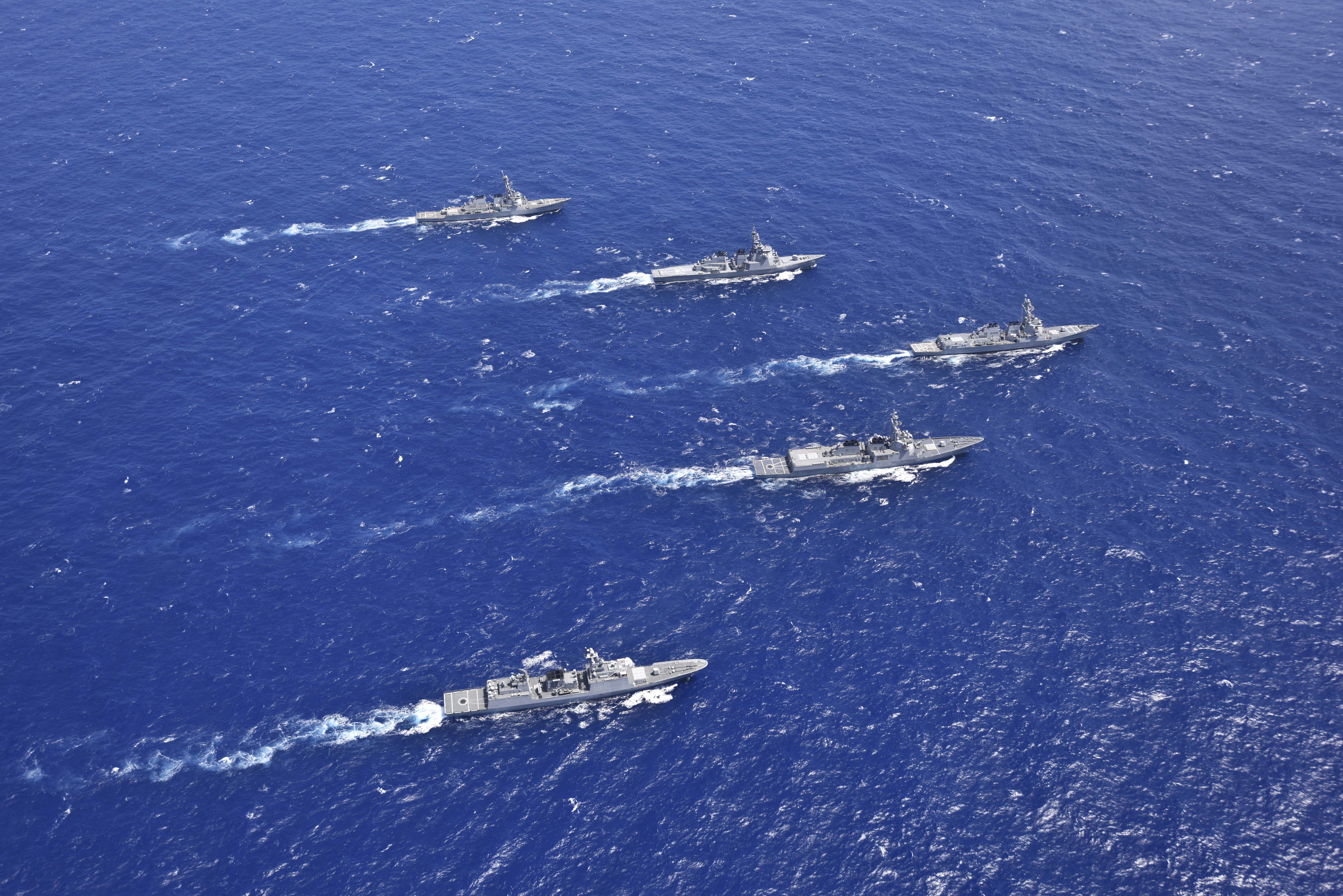
USS John Paul Jones, USS Shoup, JS Chokai, ROKS Sejong The Great and ROKS Gang Gam Chan maneuver into formation during Exercise Pacific Dragon 2016 on 25 June 2016.
