= ROKS Yang Man-chun =

Gwanggaeto the Great-class destroyer

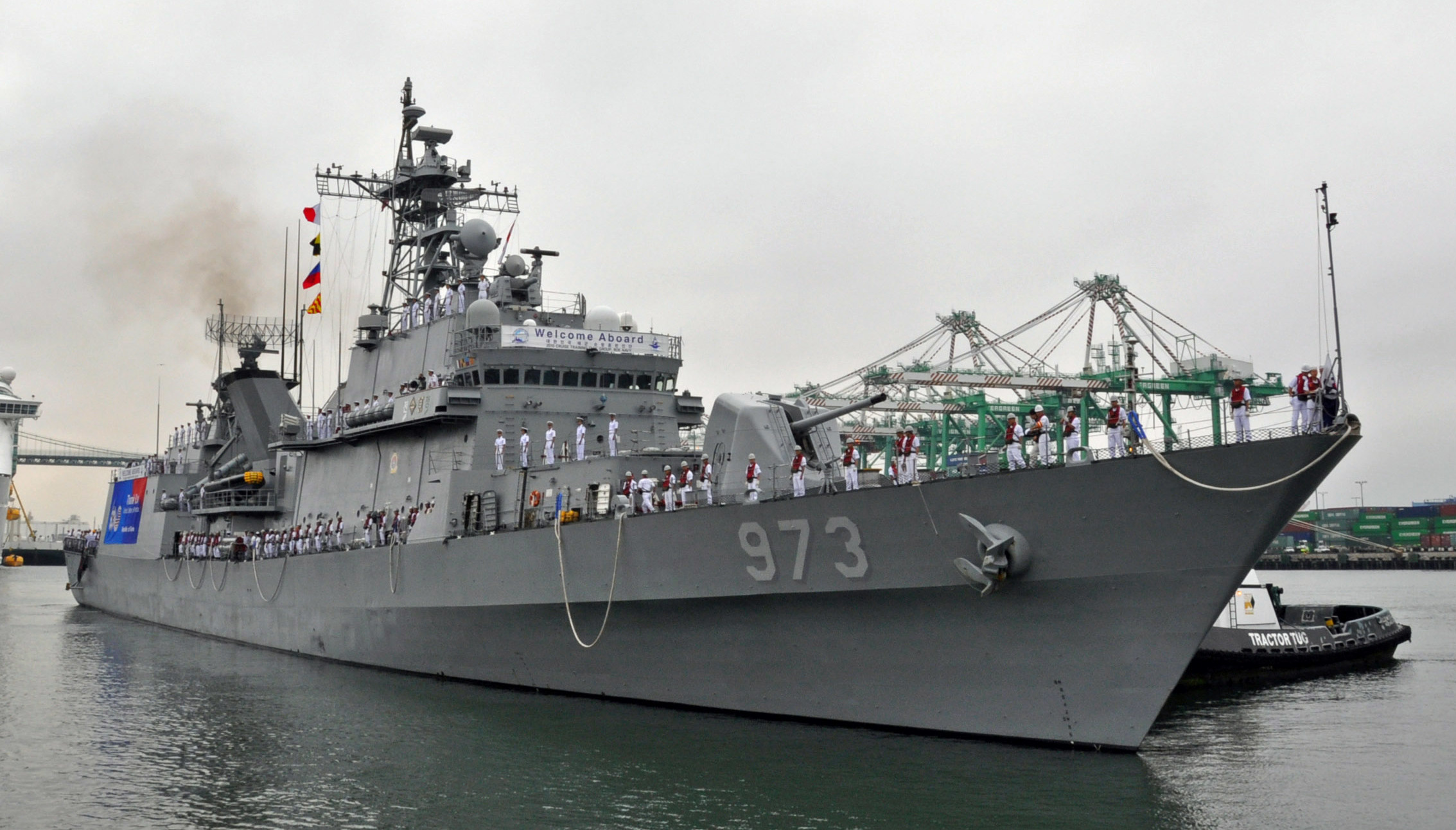
- ROKS Yang Man-chun in Los Angeles on 25 July 2010

History

South Korea
- Name: Yang Man-chun; (양만춘)
- Namesake: Yang Manchun
- Builder: DSME
- Launched: 30 September 1998
- Commissioned: 29 June 2000
- Identification: Pennant number: DDH-973
- Status: Active

General characteristics
- Class & type: Gwanggaeto the Great-class destroyer
- Displacement: 3,885–3,900 tonnes (3,824–3,838 long tons) full load
- Length: 135.5 m (444 ft 7 in)
- Beam: 14.2 m (46 ft 7 in)
- Propulsion: 2 × General Electric LM2500-30 gas turbines; 2 × SsangYong Motor Company 20V 956 TB 82 diesel engines; 2 shafts
- Speed: 30 knots (56 km/h; 35 mph)
- Complement: 286
- Sensors & processing systems: AN/SPS-49(V) 2D air search radar; Signaal MW 08 surface search radar; Daewoo SPS-95k navigation radar; 2 × Signaal STIR 180 Fire control radars; ATLAS DSQS-21BZ Hull mounted sonar
- Electronic warfare & decoys: SLQ-25 Nixie towed torpedo decoy; ARGOSystems AR 700 and APECS 2 ECM; 4 × CSEE DAGAIE MK 2 Chaff Launchers
- Armament: 1 × OTO Melara 127 mm (5 inch)/54 gun; 2 × Signaal 30 mm Goalkeeper CIWS; 8 × Harpoon missile in quad canisters; 1 × Mk 48 Mod 2 VLS with 16 RIM-7P Sea Sparrow missiles; 2 × triple torpedo tubes for Mark 46 torpedo

ROKS Yang Man-chun (DDH-973) is the third ship of the Gwangaetto the Great-class in the Republic of Korea Navy. She is named after Yang Man-chun.

== Development ==
The KDX-I was designed to replace the old destroyers in the ROKN that were transferred from the US Navy in the 1950s and 1960s. It was thought to be a major turning point for the ROKN in that the launching of the first KDX-I meant that ROKN finally had a capability to project power far from its shores. After the launching of the ship, there was a massive boom in South Korean international participation against piracy and military operations other than war.

== Construction and career ==
ROKS Yang Man-chun was launched on 30 September 1998 by Daewoo Shipbuilding and commissioned on 29 June 2000.

=== RIMPAC 2008 ===
ROKS Yang Man-chun and ROKS Munmu the Great participated in RIMPAC 2008 and they were part of USS Kitty Hawk's battle group.

== Gallery ==
ROKS Yang Man-chun Gallery

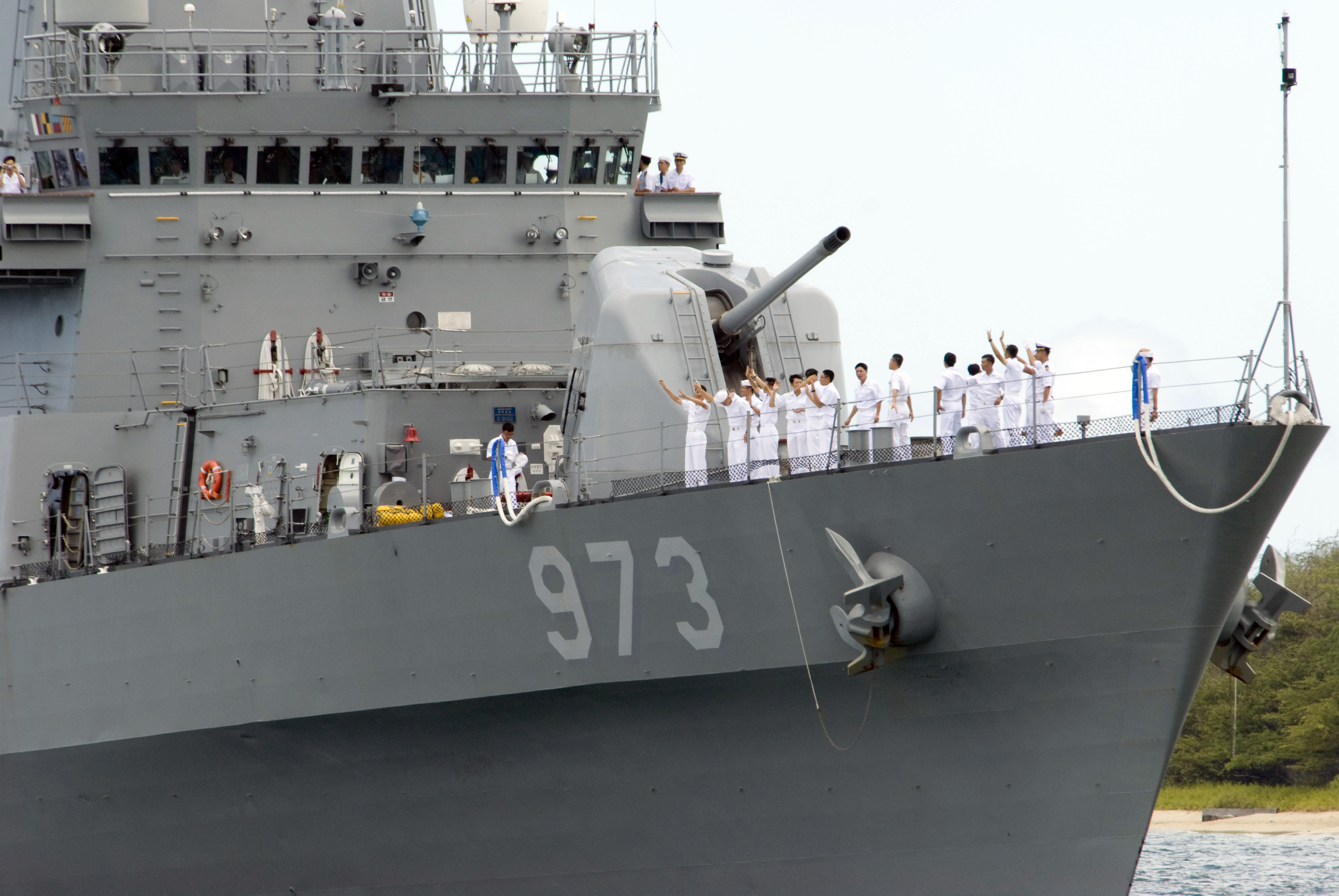
ROKS Yang Man-chun enters Pearl Harbor prior to RIMPAC 2008.

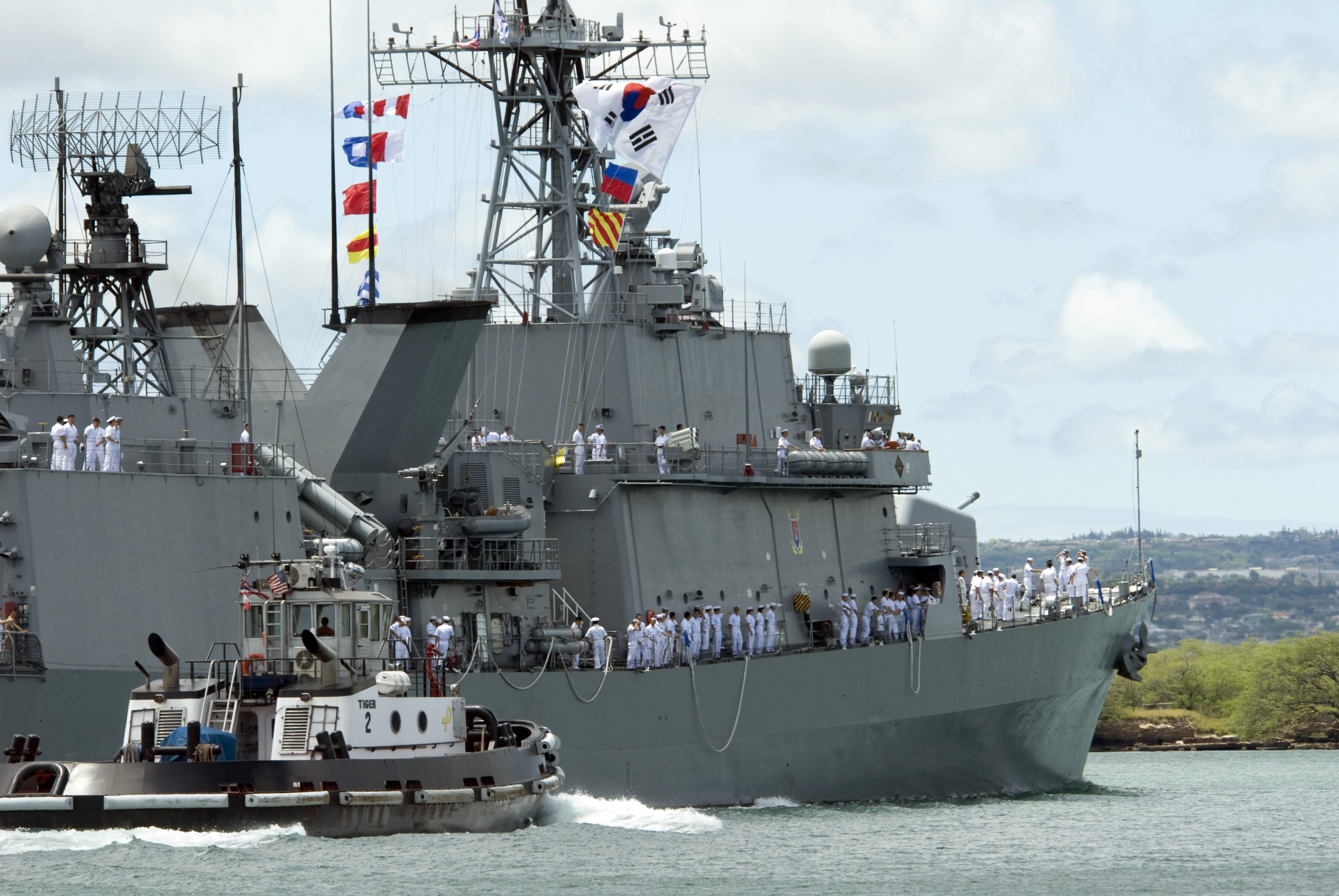
ROKS Yang Man-chun is escorted by a U.S. Navy tugboat as it enters Pearl Harbor prior to RIMPAC 2008.

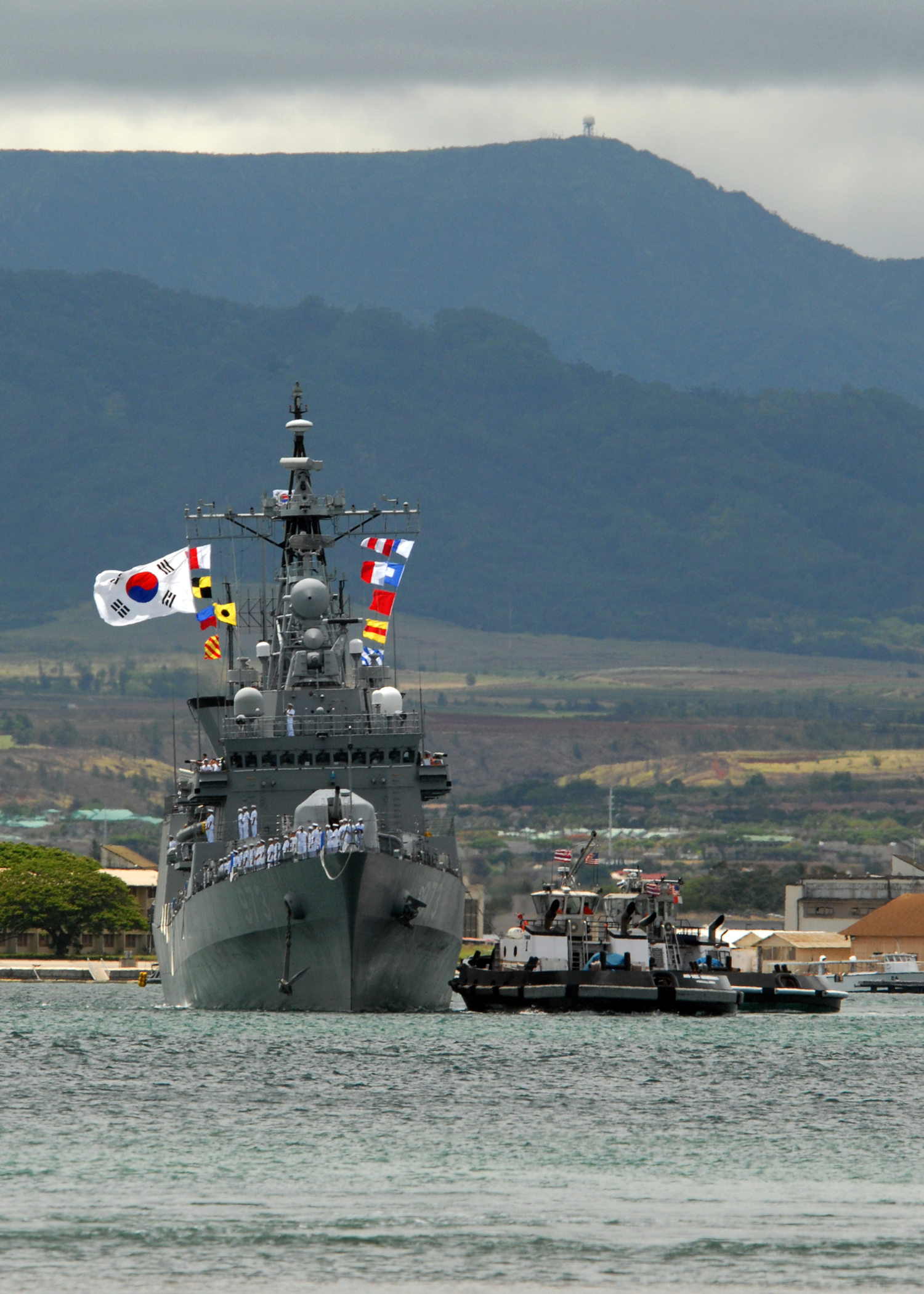
ROKS Yang Man-chun is escorted by a U.S. Navy tugboat as it enters Pearl Harbor prior to RIMPAC 2008.
