= Gawthrop (band) =

South Korean doom metal band

- Origin: Seoul, South Korea
- Genres: doom metal; sludge metal
- Years active: 2018-present
- Label: Sentient Ruin Laboratories
- Members: Jang Sunggun; Hyunwoong; Owen; Mansu

Gawthrop (Korean: 고쓰롭) is a South Korean doom metal band. The band consists of Jang Sunggun, Hyunwoong, Owen and Mansu. Since their formation in 2018, the band has released a studio album Kuboa (2025).

== History ==
Goshrop was formed in 2018 and is based in Seoul. In 2019, they released a three-track demo. The member Jang Sunggun is a former member of the Bamseom Pirates.

Their first studio album, Kuboa, was recorded in 2020 during the COVID-19 pandemic, and was released five years later, on 19 September 2025.

== Discography ==
=== Studio albums ===
- Kuboa (2025)
