= Gwanggaeto the Great-class destroyer =

Class of South Korean destroyers

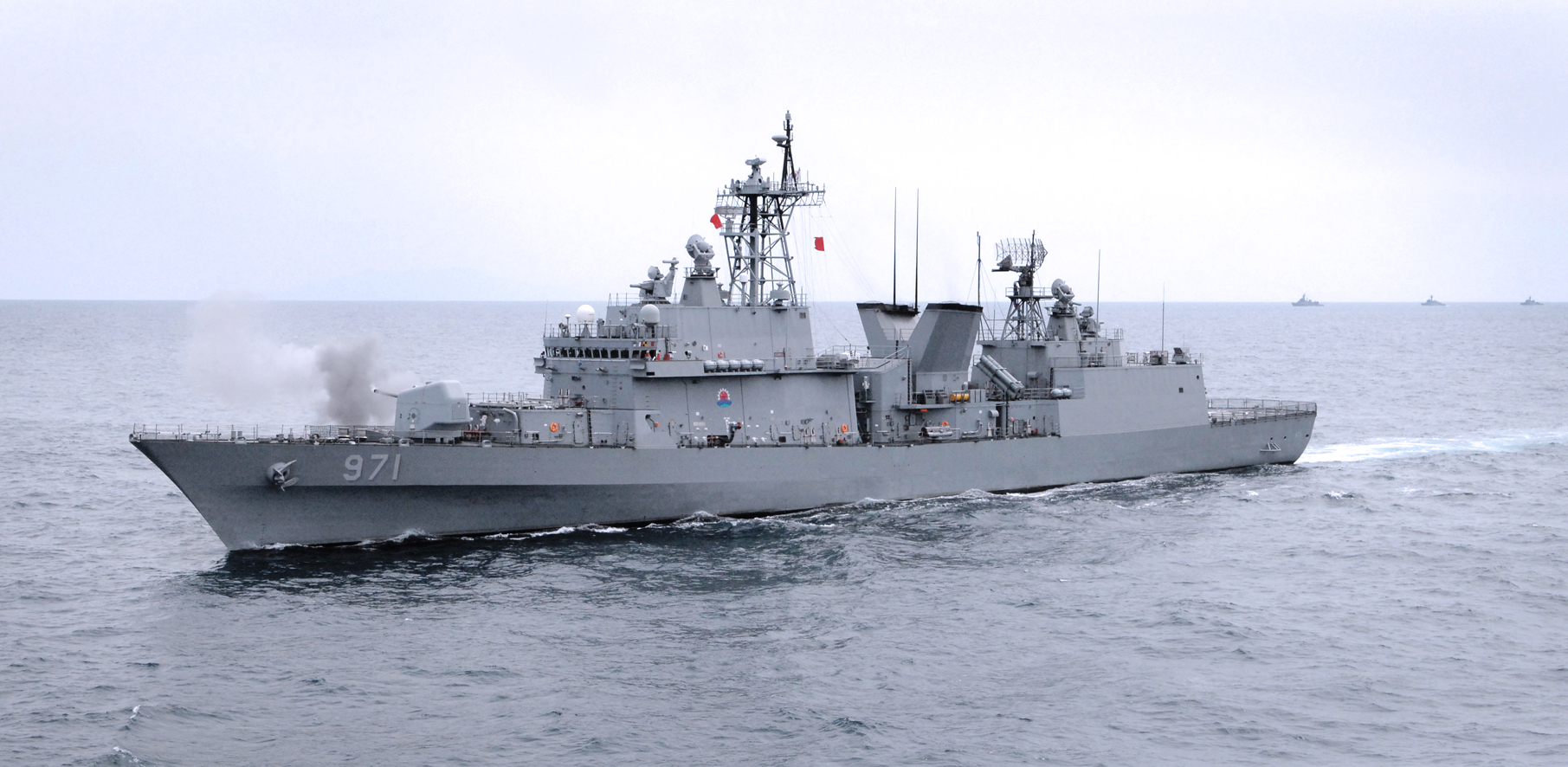
- ROKS Gwanggaeto the Great underway at sea in 2009

Class overview
- Name: Gwanggaeto the Great class
- Builders: Daewoo Heavy Industries Co., Okpo, Geoje
- Operators: Republic of Korea Navy; Royal Thai Navy
- Preceded by: Gangwon class
- Succeeded by: Chungmugong Yi Sun-sin class
- Subclasses: Bhumibol Adulyadej-class frigate
- Built: 1994–2000
- In commission: 1998–present
- Planned: 12
- Completed: 3
- Cancelled: 9
- Active: 3

General characteristics
- Type: Destroyer or Frigate
- Displacement: 3,885–3,900 tonnes (3,824–3,838 long tons) full load
- Length: 135.5 m (444 ft 7 in)
- Beam: 14.2 m (46 ft 7 in)
- Draft: 4.2 m (13 ft 9 in)
- Propulsion: 2 × General Electric LM2500-30 gas turbines; 2 × SsangYong Motor Company 20V 956 TB 82 diesel engines; 2 shafts
- Speed: 30 knots (56 km/h; 35 mph)
- Range: 4,500 nmi (8,300 km; 5,200 mi) at 18 kn (33 km/h; 21 mph)
- Complement: 286
- Sensors & processing systems: AN/SPS-49(V) 2D air search radar; Signaal MW 08 surface search radar; Daewoo SPS-95k navigation radar; 2 × Signaal STIR 180 Fire control radars; ATLAS DSQS-21BZ Hull mounted sonar
- Electronic warfare & decoys: SLQ-25 Nixie towed torpedo decoy; ARGOSystems AR 700 and APECS 2 ECM; 4 × CSEE DAGAIE MK 2 Chaff Launchers
- Armament: 1 × OTO Melara 127 mm (5 inch)/54 gun; 2 × Signaal 30 mm Goalkeeper CIWS; 8 × Harpoon missile in quad canisters; 1 × Mk 48 Mod 2 VLS with 16 RIM-7P Sea Sparrow missiles; 2 × triple torpedo tubes for Mark 46 torpedo
- Aircraft carried: 2 × Super Lynx helicopters

The Gwanggaeto the Great-class destroyers (Korean: 광개토대왕급 구축함; Hanja: 廣開土大王級 驅逐艦), often called KDX-I, are destroyers, but are classified by some as frigates, operated by the Republic of Korea Navy. Their commissioning was the first phase of ROKN's KDX program, in moving the ROK Navy from a coastal defence force to a blue-water navy.

== Development ==
The KDX-I was designed to replace the old destroyers in the ROKN that were transferred from the US Navy in the 1950s and 1960s. It was thought to be a major turning point for the ROKN in that the launching of the first KDX-I meant that ROKN finally had a capability to project power far from its shores. After the launching of the ship, there was a massive boom in South Korean international participation against piracy and military operations other than war.

== Description ==
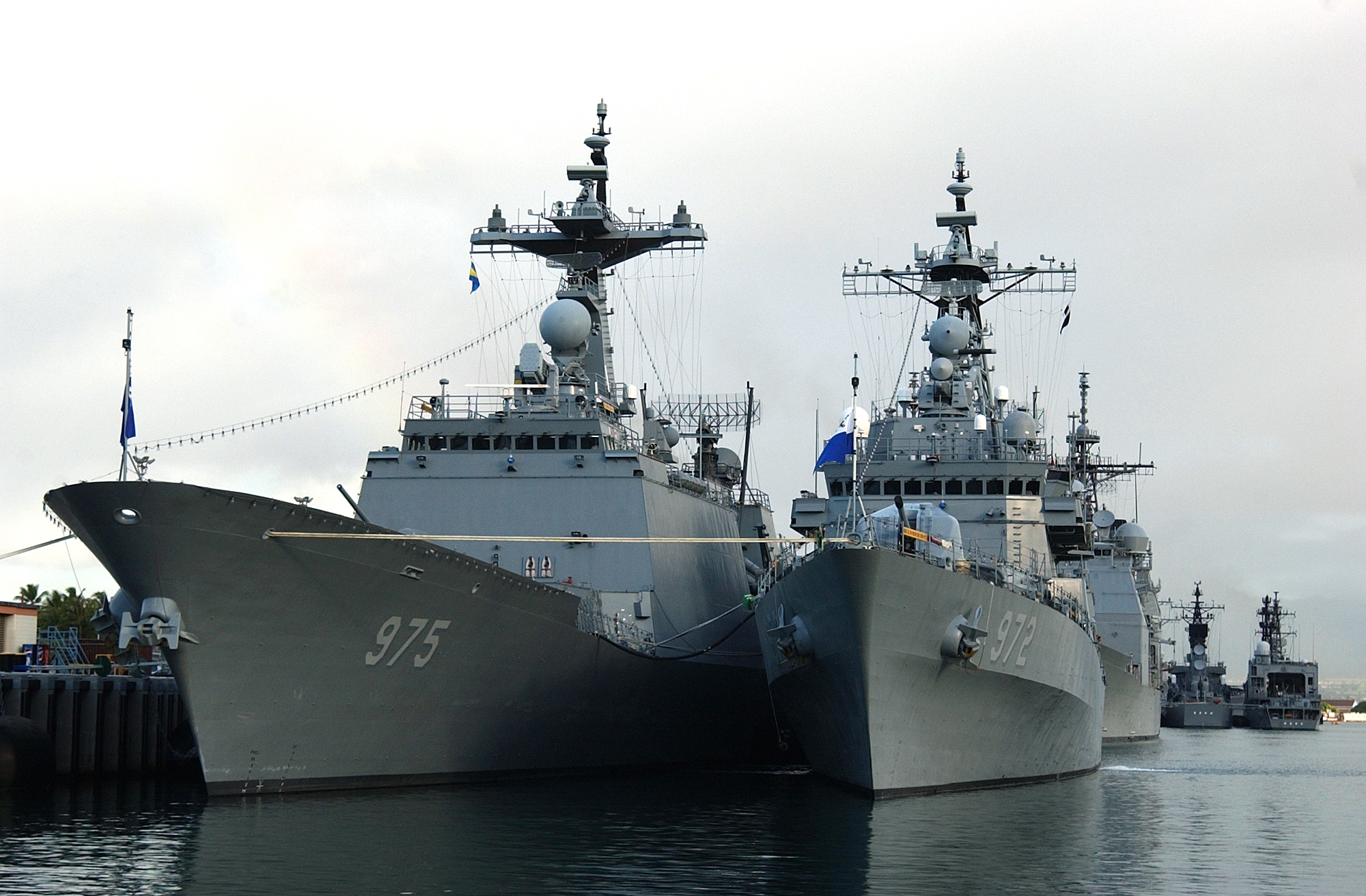
ROKS Eulji Mundeok (DDH-972) rafted next to ROKS Chungmugong Yi Sun-sin (DDH-975) in Pearl Harbor, Hawaii during RIMPAC 2004

=== Weapon systems ===
The primary weapon deployed by Gwanggaeto the Great-class vessels is the Super Lynx helicopter, which acts in concert with shipboard sensors to seek out and destroy submarines at long distances from the ships. The Gwanggaeto the Great class also carries a close-in anti-submarine weapon in the form of the Mark 46 torpedoes, launched from triple torpedo tubes in launcher compartments either side of the forward end of the helicopter hangar. A secondary anti-shipping role is supported by the RGM-84 Harpoon surface-to-surface missile, mounted in two quadruple launch tubes at the main deck level between the funnel and the helicopter hangar. For anti-aircraft self-defense, the Gwanggaeto the Great class carries 16 RIM-7P Sea Sparrow. The Gwanggaeto the Great class also carries two 30mm Goalkeeper to provide a shipboard point-defense against incoming anti-ship missiles and aircraft. The main gun on the forecastle is an OTO Melara 127 gun.

=== Propulsion ===
The Gwanggaeto the Great class is powered by two General Electric LM2500-30 gas turbines and two SsangYong 20V 956 TB 82 diesel engines. The Gwanggaeto the Great class can reach a maximum speed of 30 knots.

== Construction ==
All Gwanggaeto the Great-class destroyers were built by the Daewoo Heavy Industries Co., Inc. at Geoje, South Korea. In 1989, Daewoo Heavy Industries began working on the 4,000-ton destroyer which is now the secondary destroyer of the Korean navy, and the achievement was made through DSME's 100% design engineering for the first time in Korea.

The keel of the first ship was planned to have been laid down in late 1992 and the ship was planned to be completed in 1996. But due to definition studies that lasted until late 1993, the construction of the first ship did not started until April 1994 with the first steel cutting at Daewoo shipyard in Okpo.

== Modernisation/Mid-Life Update ==
It was reported on April 27, 2016, that the KDX-1 class will undergo a limited mid-life upgrade at a cost of 67.41 billion won, aimed at replacing obsolete foreign equipment. The original command and control system (BAeSEMA SSCS Mk-7 combat management system) was replaced with Hanwha System's combat management system (likely Naval Shield ICMS), the installation of a domestic Towed Array Sonar System (TASS, likely from MteQ), LINK-16 and general equipment overhaul.

The first vessel, ROKS Yang Man-chun completed the upgrade in September 2020 at DSME, while the second vessel, ROKS Gwanggaeto the Great completed the upgrade in November 2021 and the final vessel, ROKS Eulji Mundok completed the upgrade in December 2021.

== Ships in the class ==
Name	Pennant number	Builder	Launched	Delivered	Commissioned	Status
ROKS Gwanggaeto the Great	DDH-971	Daewoo Heavy Industries	28 October 1996		24 July 1998	Active
ROKS Eulji Mundeok	DDH-972	Daewoo Heavy Industries	16 October 1997		30 August 1999	Active
ROKS Yang Man-chun	DDH-973	Daewoo Heavy Industries	30 September 1998		29 June 2000	Active

== Bhumibol Adulyadej class ==
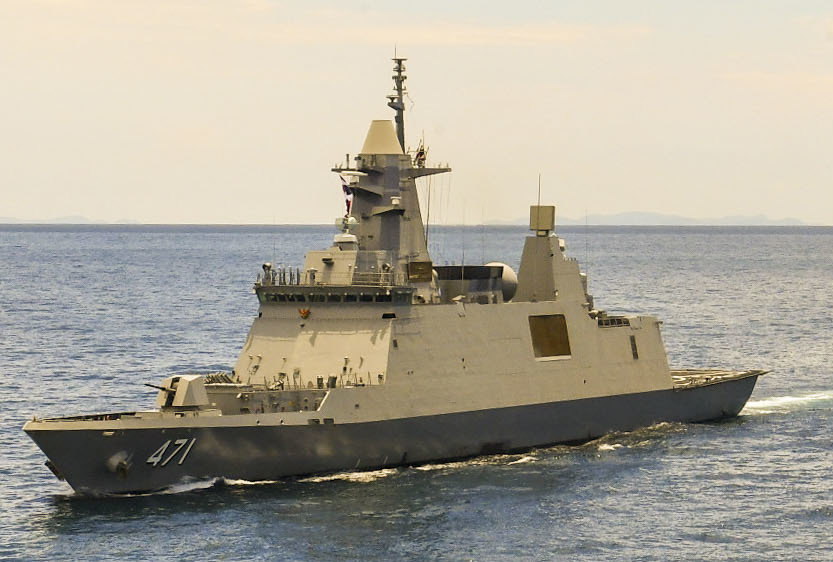
HTMS Bhumibol Adulyadej (FFG 471)

The Bhumibol Adulyadej-class frigate is a modification of the Gwanggaeto the Great class for the Royal Thai Navy. It differs from the Gwanggaeto the Great class with the addition of stealth features.

- HTMS Bhumibol Adulyadej (Active)
- HTMS Prasae (Postponed)

== See also ==
- List of destroyer classes in service

Equivalent destroyers of the same era

- Murasame class
- Delhi class
- Type 051B
