= ROKS Eulji Mundeok =

Gwanggaeto the Great-class destroyer

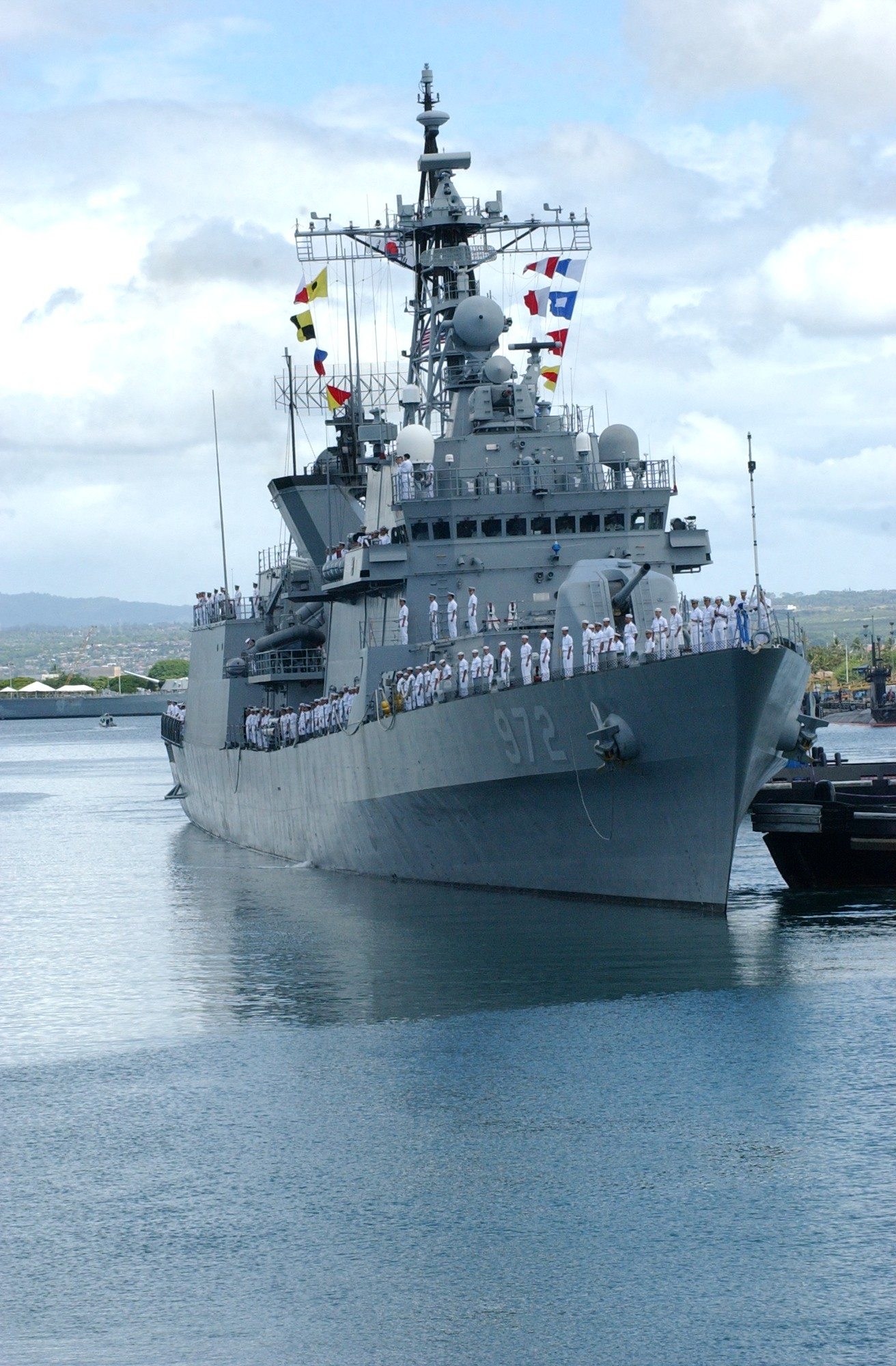
- ROKS Eulji Mundeok in March 2020

History

South Korea
- Name: Eulji Mundeok; (을지문덕)
- Namesake: Eulji Mundeok
- Builder: DSME
- Launched: 16 October 1997
- Commissioned: 30 August 1999
- Identification: Pennant number: DDH-972
- Status: Active

General characteristics
- Class & type: Gwanggaeto the Great-class destroyer
- Displacement: 3,885–3,900 tonnes (3,824–3,838 long tons) full load
- Length: 135.5 m (444 ft 7 in)
- Beam: 14.2 m (46 ft 7 in)
- Propulsion: 2 × General Electric LM2500-30 gas turbines; 2 × SsangYong Motor Company 20V 956 TB 82 diesel engines; 2 shafts
- Speed: 30 knots (56 km/h; 35 mph)
- Complement: 286
- Sensors & processing systems: AN/SPS-49(V) 2D air search radar; Signaal MW 08 surface search radar; Daewoo SPS-95k navigation radar; 2 × Signaal STIR 180 Fire control radars; ATLAS DSQS-21BZ Hull mounted sonar
- Electronic warfare & decoys: SLQ-25 Nixie towed torpedo decoy; ARGOSystems AR 700 and APECS 2 ECM; 4 × CSEE DAGAIE MK 2 Chaff Launchers
- Armament: 1 × OTO Melara 127 mm (5 inch)/54 gun; 2 × Signaal 30 mm Goalkeeper CIWS; 8 × Harpoon missile in quad canisters; 1 × Mk 48 Mod 2 VLS with 16 RIM-7P Sea Sparrow missiles; 2 × triple torpedo tubes for Mark 46 torpedo

ROKS Eulji Mundeok (DDH-972) is the second ship of the Gwangaetto the Great-class in the Republic of Korea Navy. She is named after Eulji Mundeok.

== Development ==
The KDX-I was designed to replace the old destroyers in the ROKN that were transferred from the US Navy in the 1950s and 1960s. It was thought to be a major turning point for the ROKN in that the launching of the first KDX-I meant that ROKN finally had a capability to project power far from its shores. After the launching of the ship, there was a massive boom in South Korean international participation against piracy and military operations other than war.

== Construction and career ==
ROKS Eulji Mundeok was launched on 16 October 1997 by Daewoo Shipbuilding and commissioned on 30 August 1999.

=== RIMPAC 2000 ===
ROKS Eulji Mundeok and ROKS Jeon Nam participated in RIMPAC 2000. Both ships joined USS Abraham Lincoln Battle Group along with ships from Australia, Chile, Japan, Canada, and South Korea steam alongside one another.

=== RIMPAC 2004 ===
ROKS Chungmugong Yi Sun-sin and ROKS Eulji Mundeok joined RIMPAC 2004 which included 40 ships, seven submarines, 100 aircraft, and nearly 18,000 military personnel from seven navies, including Canada, Australia, Japan, South Korea, Chile, and the United Kingdom. Both ships were part of USS John C. Stennis’ Battle Group during the exercise.

ROKS Eulji Mundeok was proudly honored as the top gunnery ship of the year in 2014.
