= ROKS Gwanggaeto the Great =

Gwanggaeto the Great-class destroyer

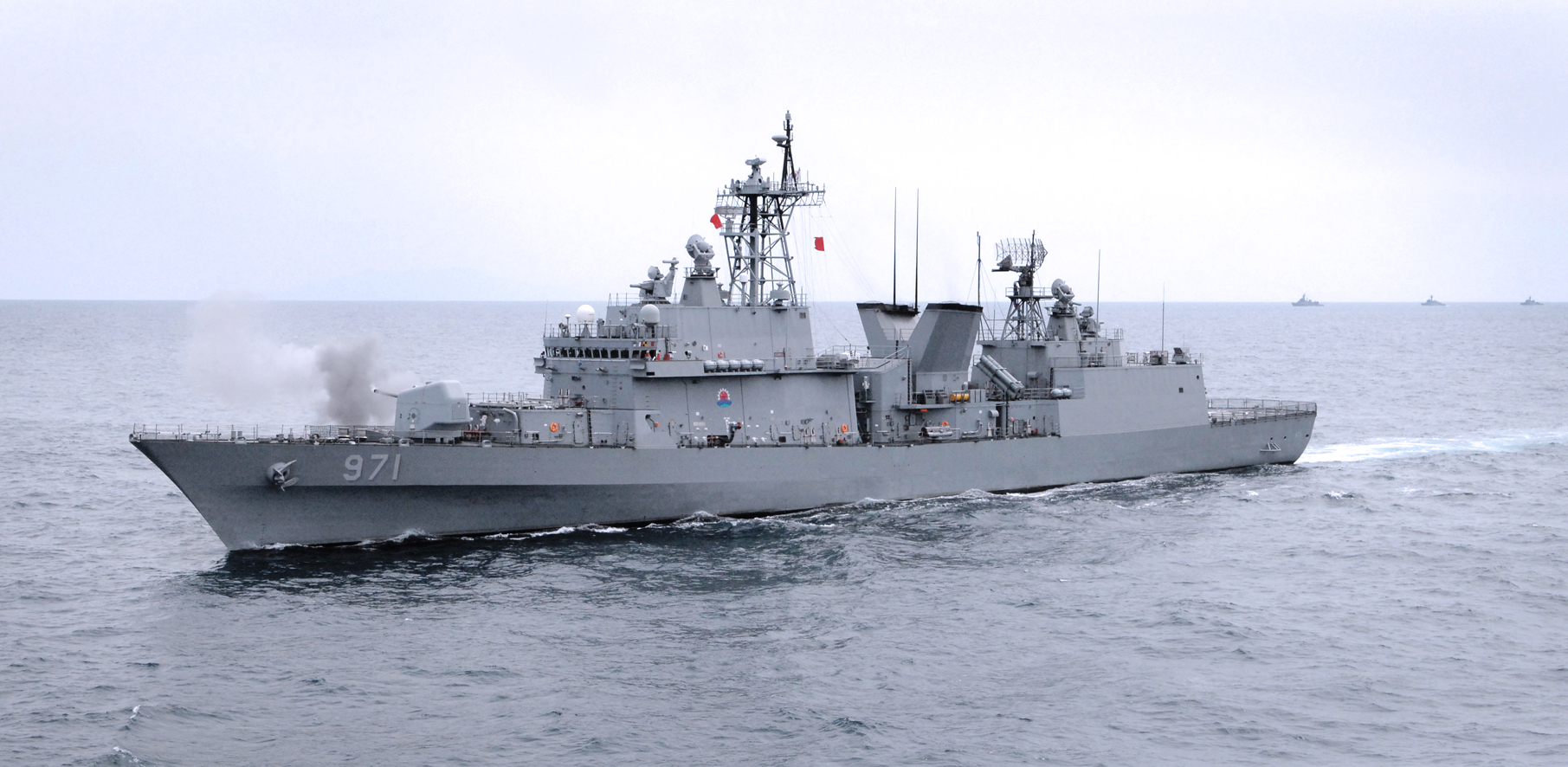
- ROKS Gwanggaeto the Great on 1 January 2012

History

South Korea
- Name: Gwanggaeto the Great; (광개토대왕)
- Namesake: Gwanggaeto the Great
- Builder: DSME
- Launched: 23 October 1996
- Commissioned: 24 July 1998
- Identification: Pennant number: DDH-971
- Status: Active

General characteristics
- Class & type: Gwanggaeto the Great-class destroyer
- Displacement: 3,885–3,900 tonnes (3,824–3,838 long tons) full load
- Length: 135.5 m (444 ft 7 in)
- Beam: 14.2 m (46 ft 7 in)
- Propulsion: 2 × General Electric LM2500-30 gas turbines; 2 × SsangYong Motor Company 20V 956 TB 82 diesel engines; 2 shafts
- Speed: 30 knots (56 km/h; 35 mph)
- Complement: 286
- Sensors & processing systems: AN/SPS-49(V) 2D air search radar; Signaal MW 08 surface search radar; Daewoo SPS-95k navigation radar; 2 × Signaal STIR 180 Fire control radars; ATLAS DSQS-21BZ Hull mounted sonar
- Electronic warfare & decoys: SLQ-25 Nixie towed torpedo decoy; ARGOSystems AR 700 and APECS 2 ECM; 4 × CSEE DAGAIE MK 2 Chaff Launchers
- Armament: 1 × OTO Melara 127 mm (5 inch)/54 gun; 2 × Signaal 30 mm Goalkeeper CIWS; 8 × Harpoon missile in quad canisters; 1 × Mk 48 Mod 2 VLS with 16 RIM-7P Sea Sparrow missiles; 2 × triple torpedo tubes for Mark 46 torpedo

ROKS Gwanggaeto the Great (DDH-971) is the lead ship of the Gwanggaeto the Great-class in the Republic of Korea Navy. She is named after Gwanggaeto the Great.

== Development ==
The KDX-I was designed to replace the old destroyers in the ROKN that were transferred from the US Navy in the 1950s and 1960s. It was thought to be a major turning point for the ROKN in that the launching of the first KDX-I meant that ROKN finally had a capability to project power far from its shores. After the launching of the ship, there was a massive boom in South Korean international participation against piracy and military operations other than war.

== Construction and career ==
ROKS Gwanggaeto the Great was launched on 28 October 1996 by Daewoo Shipbuilding and commissioned on 24 July 1998.

== Gallery ==
ROKS Gwanggaeto the Great Gallery

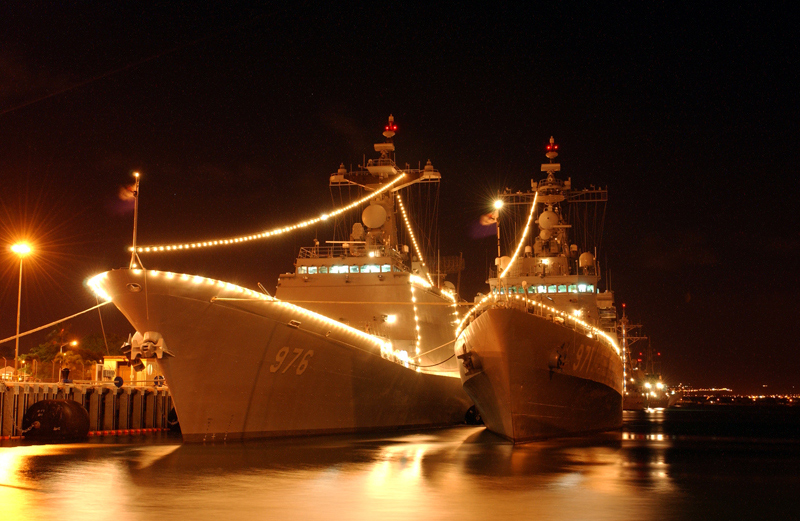
ROKS Munmu The Great and ROKS Kwanggaeto The Great lighted ship's lights to celebrate the July 4th Independence Day 2006.

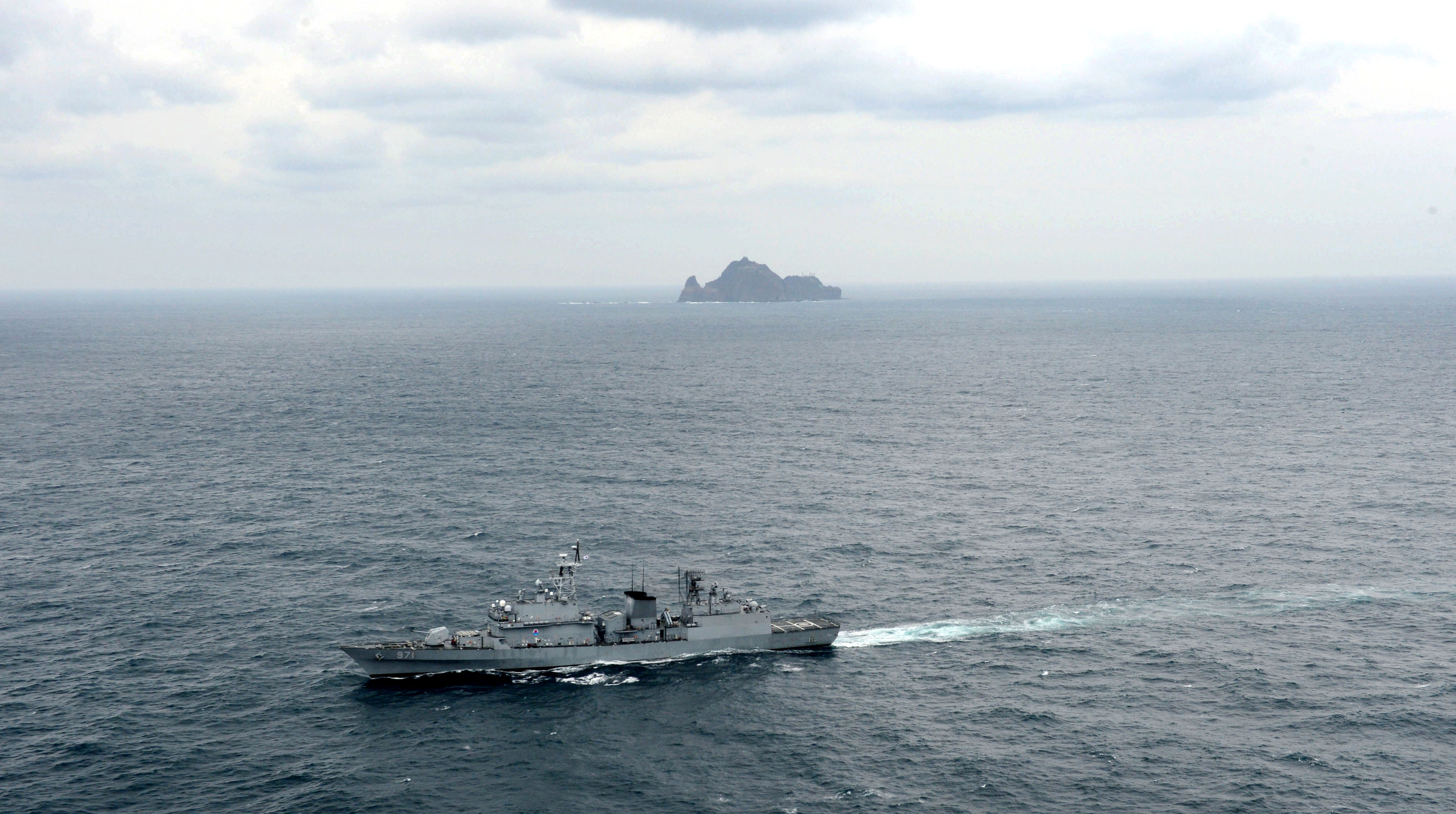
ROKS Gwanggaeto the Great maneuvering while on patrol on 25 October 2013.

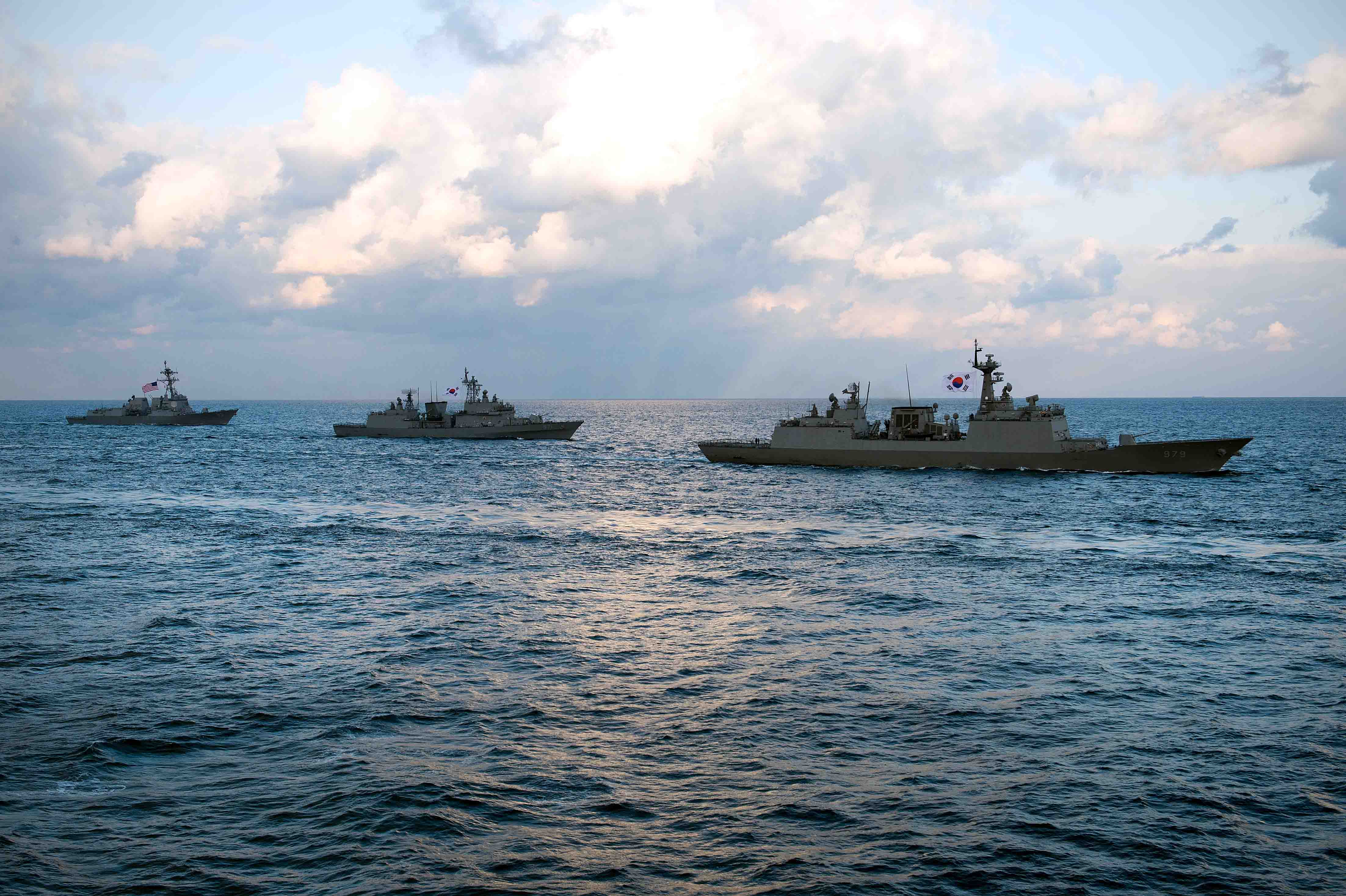
ROKS Gang Gam-chan, ROKS Gwangaetto the Great and USS Chung Hoon in formation during Foal Eagle 2016 on 24 March 2016.
