= Borrowed Tongue =

Studio album by Minhwi Lee
- Released: 17 November 2016
- Genre: Contemporary folk
- Length: 29:06
- Label: Self-released
- Producer: Minhwi Lee

Minhwi Lee chronology
Borrowed Tongue (2016)	Music for Hwi-i-ing (2023)

Borrowed Tongue (Korean: 빌린 입; RR: Bilin ib) is the debut studio album by South Korean singer-songwriter Minhwi Lee. The album was released on 17 November 2016. The album won The Best Folk Album at the 2017 Korean Music Awards.

== Background ==
Before her solo debut, Minhwi Lee was famous under the name of Mukimukimanmansu's Mansu. In an interview with Indiepost, she said about Borrowed Tongue, "I did not record on various topics like during Mukimukimanmansu's music style, but rather made them with one theme."

== Critical reception ==
Kim Banya of IZM said, "All of this in Borrowed Tongue blooms with an atypical beauty in a minimal order.". Seong Hyosun of Weiv reviewed the album as "Borrowed Tongue will be a good stimulus and direction for those who face all kinds of absurdities in the world every day and suffer frustration and despair, but speak only with borrowed tongue or remain silent", and named it the second in the best Korean albums of 2016.

Publication	List	Rank	Ref.
IZM	The best indie albums of 2016	N/A	
Music Y	The 20 Editor's best Korean albums of 2016	N/A	
Weiv	The best Korean albums of 2016	2	

== Track listing ==
No.	Title	Length
1.	"Stone-Throwing" ("돌팔매")	2:01
2.	"Borrowed Tongue" ("빌린 입")	4:23
3.	"Mirror" ("거울")	2:36
4.	"Swollen Foot" ("부은 발")	4:47
5.	"Dream" ("꿈")	3:28
6.	"Broken Mirror" ("깨진 거울")	4:16
7.	"Dictée" ("받아쓰기")	2:46
8.	"The Light of Silence" ("침묵의 빛")	4:49
