= Mukimukimanmansu =

2011–2013 Korean music duo

Mukimukimanmansu 무키무키만만수
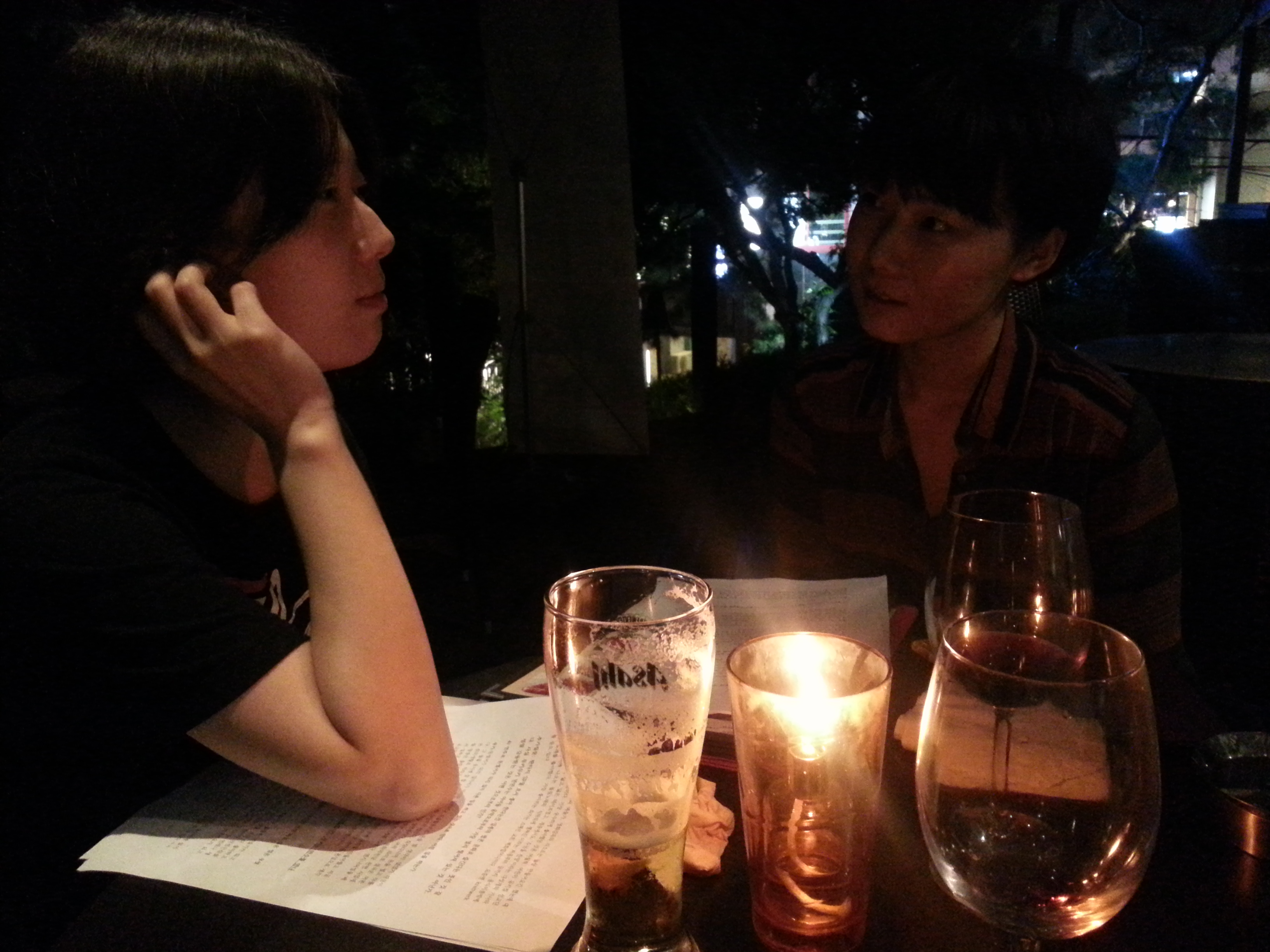
- Lee Min-hwi (right) and Jeong Eun-sil (left) in 2013

Background information
- Origin: Seoul, South Korea
- Instruments: Guitar, Janggu
- Years active: 2011-2013
- Label: Beatball Records
- Members: Muki (Jeong Eun-sil), Mansu (Minhwi Lee)

Mukimukimanmansu (무키무키만만수) were an indie South Korean musical duo. The two members are Muki (Jeong Eun-sil, Korean: 정은실) and Mansu (Minhwi Lee, Korean: 이민휘), who were classmates from the Korean National University of Arts. Mansu played the guitar, and Muki played a modified version of a traditional Korean drum called a Janggu. They both provided vocals. They released their studio album, 2012 and were nominated as Rookies of the Year at the 2013 Korean Music Awards.

== Formation and beginnings ==
Mukimukimanmansu was formed by Lee Min-hwi and Jeong Eun-sil, two students at the Korean National University of Arts, who were part of the 'Dolgoki Vista Social Club' film club to participate in 'the Trash Music festival', held under the Sinimun Station 3 days before the festival itself. A video of the festival of them covering two songs by Sanulrim and Hahn Vad respectively, as well as two songs they wrote themselves were posted to YouTube. In 2012, they released their studio album, 2012 and were nominated as Rookies of the Year at the 2013 Korean Music Awards. Kim Banya of IZM described the album as "the definition of indie music is being broken down."

The name Mukimukimanmansu comes from a portmanteau of both the women's nicknames from school; Jeong received the name "Muki" from a novel called "In search of lost concepts" (Korean: 잃어버린 개념을 찾아서) by Bae Myung-hoon (Korean: 배명훈), and Lee said she got called "Mansu" by the director of the school's newspaper because she resembled their friend who also was named Mansu.

== Performances and disbandment ==
Since July 2011, the duo performed at various rally sites, including a protest rally in front of Hongik University, the Hanjin Heavy Industries strike in Yeongdo, Busan, and demonstrations against the establishment of a naval base in Jeju, Gangjeong Village. Soon after, the women appeared on various radio broadcasts and television shows.

On March 30, 2013, they announced they had disbanded at the Itaewon club 'Flower Land' as the club shutdown. Eun-sil read a poem to the club while performing a burning ceremony. Soon after, the club reopened and resumed business.

== Discography ==
- 2012 (2012)
