= HTMS Bhumibol Adulyadej =

Royal Thai Navy ship

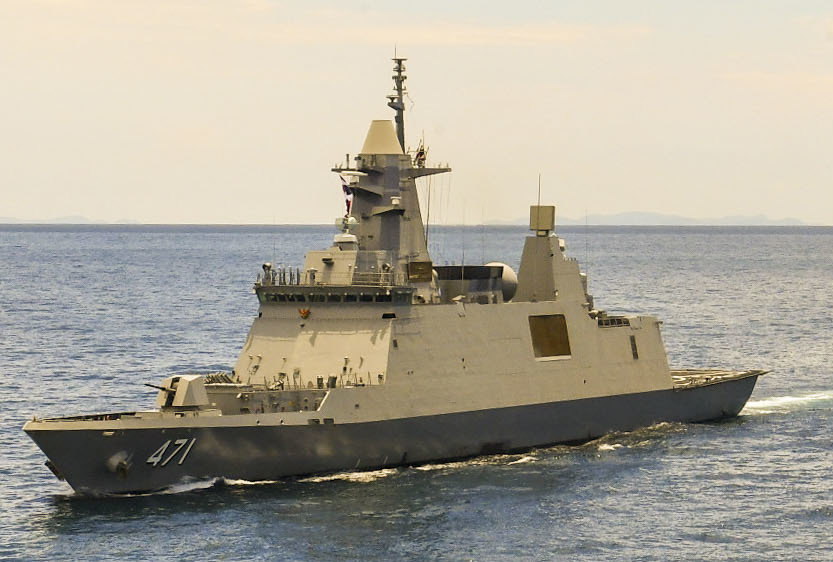
- HTMS Bhumibol Adulyadej (FFG 471)

History

Thailand
- Name: HTMS Bhumibol Adulyadej
- Namesake: King Bhumibol Adulyadej
- Ordered: 2013
- Builder: Daewoo Shipbuilding & Marine Engineering, Busan, South Korea
- Cost: 482 Million USD or 14,997 Million THB
- Laid down: 15 May 2016
- Launched: 23 January 2017
- Commissioned: 7 January 2019
- Identification: 471
- Status: In service

General characteristics
- Class & type: Bhumibol Adulyadej-class frigate
- Displacement: 3,700 tons full load
- Length: 124.1 m
- Beam: 14.40 m
- Draught: 4.3
- Installed power: 4 × Ship Service Power Generation (Each of 830 kW Rated output) Total output: 3,320 kW
- Propulsion: 2 × Diesel engine MTU 16V1163 M94 8,000 horsepower, each producing 5,920 kilowatts (7,940 bhp) Total output: 11,840 kW (15,880 bhp); 1 × General Electric LM2500 gas turbine 29,000 horsepower, each producing 25,100 kW (33,600 shp)
- Speed: 33.3 knots (61 km/h; 38 mph)
- Endurance: 4,000 nautical miles at 18 knots (7,408 km at 33 km/h)
- Crew: 141 officers
- Sensors & processing systems: 1 × Sea Giraffe 4A AESA long range surveillance radar, Instrumented range: 350 km; 1 × Saab SEA GIRAFFE AMB medium range 3D surveillance radar, Instrumented range: 180 km; 1 × Wartsila X-band Navigation radar; 1 × Wartsila S-band Navigation radar; 1 × Tactical Air Navigation System; 1 × Surveillance camera; 2 × Saab CEROS 200 fire control radar; 1 × Saab EOS 500 Electro Optical Fire Control; 1 × Atlas ASO DSQS-24 Hull Mounted Sonar; 1 × Atlas ELEKTRONIK ACTAS Towed Array Sonar
- Electronic warfare & decoys: 1 × Harris ES-3601 Radar-ESM; 1 × R&F DDF-255 Communication-ESM; 2 x 12 Terma Decoy DL-12T; 6 × 4 Terma Decoy Mk.137 Decoy Launchers for Canto-V; Active-offboard ECM; Mk 234 Nulka anti-ship missile decoy system; Naval Group CANTO-V anti-torpedo decoy system
- Armament: 1 × Otomelara 76/62 Super Rapid Stealth Shield; 2 × MSI Defence DS30M Mk.2; 2 × M2HB Browning .50 caliber guns; 1 × 20 mm Mk.15 Phalanx Block-1B CIWS; 2 × 4 RGM-84L Block II Harpoon anti-ship missile; 2 × 3 SEA Torpedo Launching System Mark 54 Lightweight Torpedo; 8-cell Mk. 41 VLS containing/or mixture of: 32 × RIM-162 ESSM Block II in quadpacked max loadout
- Aviation facilities: 1 × S-70B Seahawk or MH-60S Knight hawk

HTMS Bhumibol Adulyadej (FFG-471) (Thai: เรือหลวงภูมิพลอดุลยเดช), is the lead ship of her class of frigates for the Royal Thai Navy, developed from the Gwanggaeto the Great-class destroyer. The DW-3000F hull is different from the Gwanggaeto the Great-class destroyer, due to the design of the ship having reduced radar cross section, and there are many other additional technologies added.

== Design ==
HTMS Bhumibol Adulyadej was constructed in South Korea. It is the first ship of the High-Performance Frigate Boat Project of the Royal Thai Navy. It is able to perform 3D combat operations on both the surface, underwater and air. It was commissioned on January 7, 2019, with the original name as HTMS Tha Chin (Thai: เรือหลวงท่าจีน). Later, with the royal benevolence of His Majesty King Vajiralongkorn, the ship was bestowed with the new name HTMS Bhumibol Adulyadej.

== Design and construction ==
The ship was developed based on the South Korean Navy Gwanggaeto the Great-class destroyer (KDX-I). The ship was built at Daewoo Shipbuilding & Marine Engineering Co., Ltd, South Korea, from 2013 to 2018. The hull is designed using stealth Technology. Both the hull and its systems are focused on reducing detection through reduction of heat radiation, radar cross-section and noise. The naval combat system is linked to Air Force aircraft via Link E, Fellow vessels HTMS Naresuan (FFG-421), HTMS Taksin (FFG-422) and HTMS Chakri Naruebet (CVH-911) via Link RTN, and the Air Force’s Jas-39 Gripen multirole fighter (the Air Force's most advanced 4.5 generation fighter) via Link G.

As part of the development of Network Centric Warfare, High-performance frigates Designed hull and structure Support for improvements to be able to fire the RIM-66 Standard MR ground-to-air missile, including a plan to support it. The companies involved in the assembly system include the launch pad, the vertical missile launcher (Mk.41 VLS), the combat system. Fire control radar and target radar (Illuminator) can be improved to support the firing of such launch weapons when the Navy needs it and the budget situation allows.

== Gallery ==
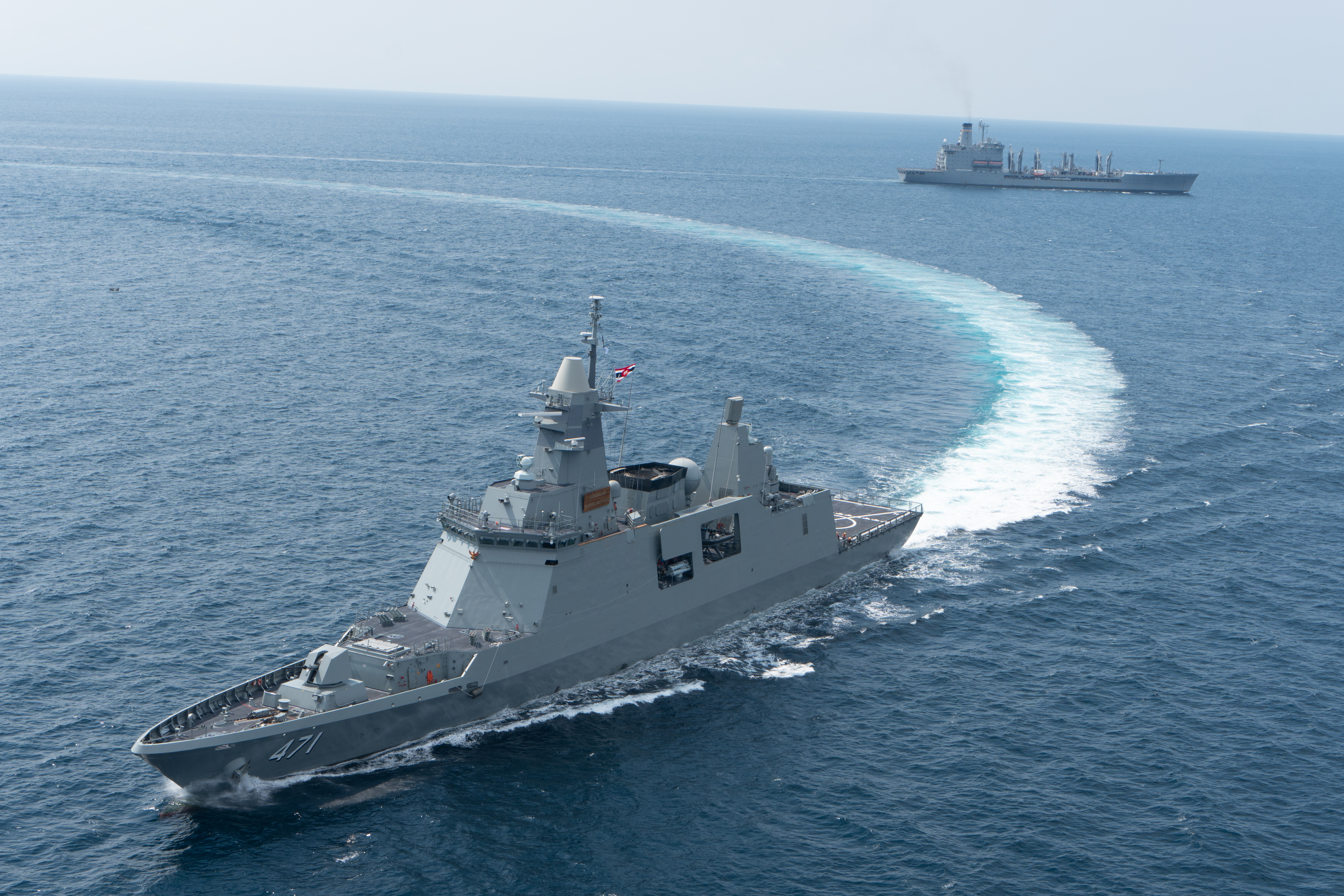
HTMS Bhumibol Adulyadej (FFG-471) sail in formation with three other ships during U.S.-Thai joint naval exercise Guardian Sea 2019

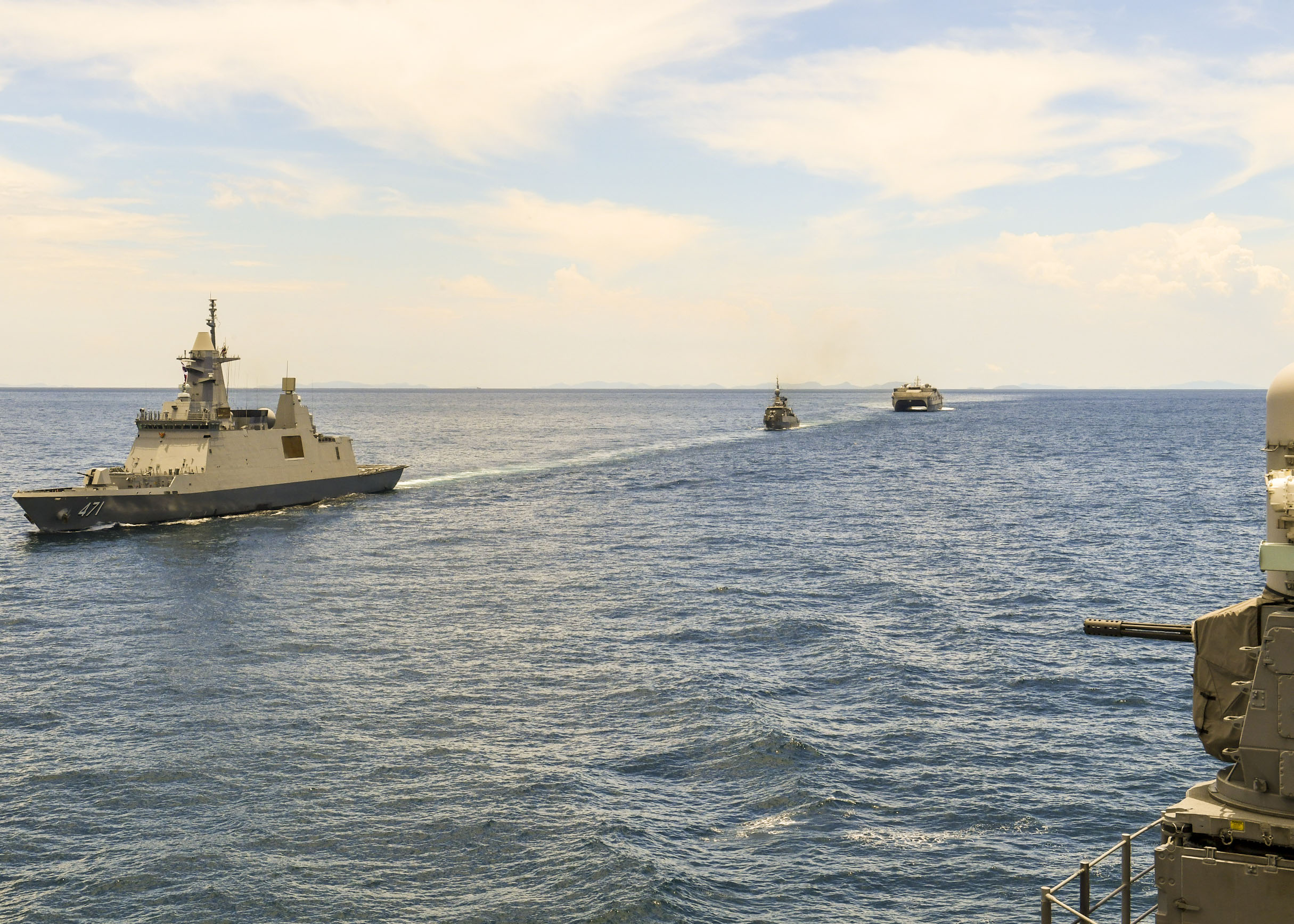
HTMS Bhumibol Adulyadej (FFG 471) sails with naval ships from the U.S. and Thailand during CARAT Thailand 2019

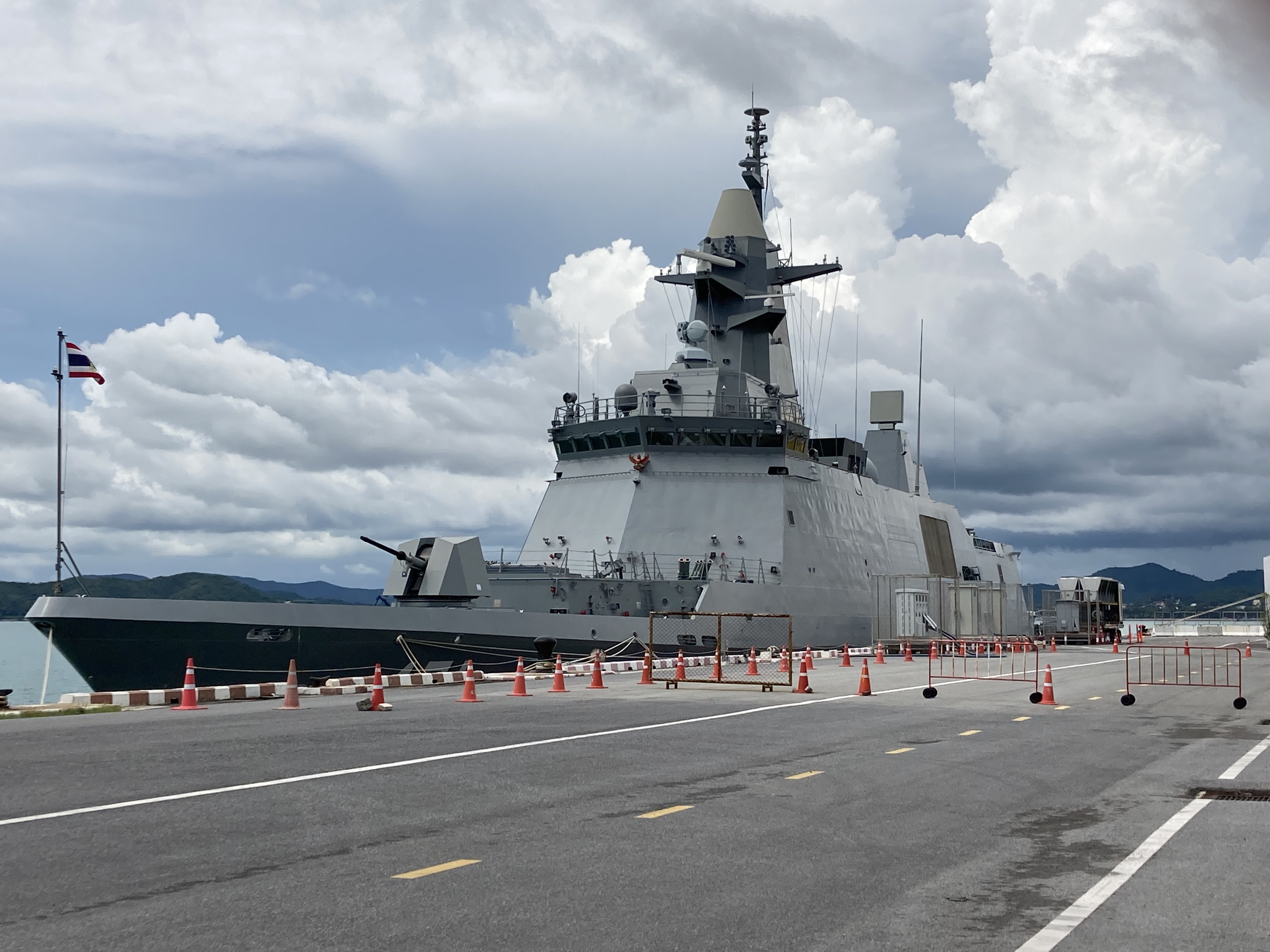
HTMS Bhumibol Adulyadej (FFG-471) moored at Sattahip Naval Base

== See also ==
- List of naval ship classes in service
- List of equipment in Royal Thai Navy
