= Bhumibol Adulyadej-class frigate =

Thai class of frigates

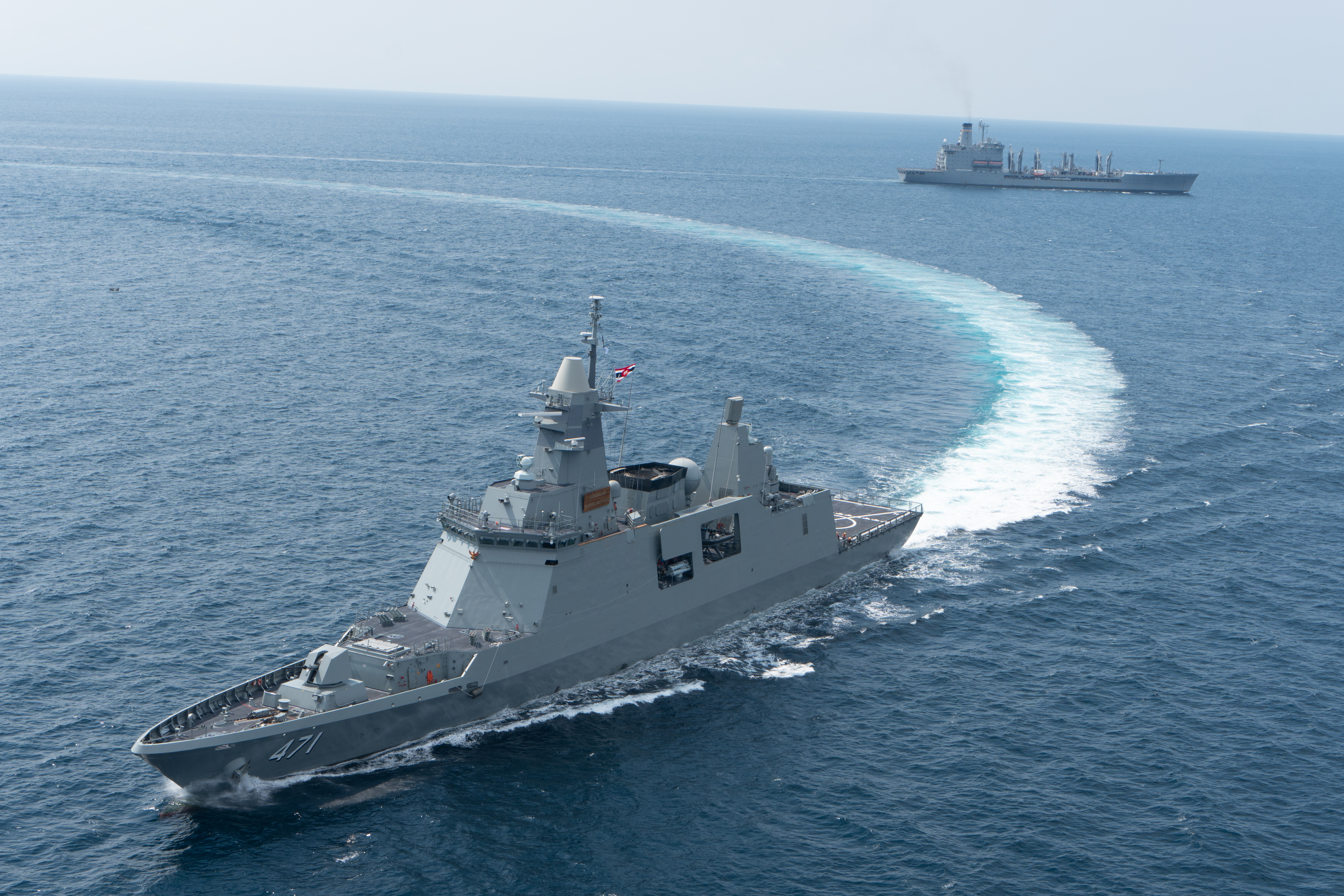
- HTMS Bhumibol Adulyadej in formation with US ships during joint naval exercise Guardian Sea 2019

Class overview
- Builders: Daewoo Shipbuilding & Marine Engineering, Busan, South Korea
- Operators: Royal Thai Navy
- Preceded by: Naresuan class
- Built: 2013–2017
- In commission: 2019–present
- Planned: 2
- Completed: 1
- Active: 1

General characteristics
- Type: Multi-role stealth frigate
- Displacement: 3,700 tons full load
- Length: 124.1 m (407 ft 2 in)
- Beam: 14.4 m (47 ft 3 in)
- Draught: 4.3 m (14 ft 1 in)
- Installed power: 4 × Ship Service Power Generation (Each of 830 kW Rated output)
- Propulsion: 2 × MTU 16V1163 M94 diesel engine 8,000 hp (6,000 kW); 1 × General Electric LM2500 gas turbine 29,000 hp (22,000 kW)
- Speed: 33.3 knots (61.7 km/h; 38.3 mph)
- Range: 4,000 nmi (7,400 km; 4,600 mi) at 18 knots (33 km/h; 21 mph)
- Complement: 141
- Sensors & processing systems: 1 × Sea Giraffe 4A AESA long range surveillance radar; 1 × Saab SEA GIRAFFE AMB medium range 3D surveillance radar; 1 × Wartsila X-band Navigation radar; 1 × Wartsila S-band Navigation radar; 1 × Tactical Air Navigation System; 1 × Surveillance camera; 2 × Saab CEROS 200 fire control radar; 1 × Saab EOS 500 Electro Optical Fire Control; 1 × Atlas ASO DSQS-24 Hull Mounted Sonar; 1 × Atlas ELEKTRONIK ACTAS Towed Array Sonar; 15 × Saab 9LV Mk4 Multi-Function Consoles; 2 × Continuous Wave Illuminators; 2 × Target Designation Sight: Bridge Pointer; 2 × Identification Friend or Foe; 1 × ADS – Broadcast; Stealth technology; Radar Cross Section Reduction; Infrared Reduction; Underwater Radiated Noise Reduction; Degaussing System; NBC Protection System
- Electronic warfare & decoys: 1 × Harris ES-3601 Radar-ESM; 1 × R&F DDF-255 Communication-ESM; 6 × Terma C-Guard DL-12T Mk. 137 Decoy Launchers; Active-offboard ECM; Mk.234 Nulka anti-ship missile decoy system; Naval Group CANTO-V anti-torpedo decoy system
- Armament: 1 × OTO Melara 76 mm/62 Super Rapid main gun; 2 × 30mm DS30M Mark 2 Automated Small Calibre Gun; 2 × M2 Browning .50 caliber guns; 1 × 20 mm Phalanx CIWS; 8 × RGM-84L Block II Harpoon anti-ship missile; 2 x SEA Torpedo Launching System Mk 32 torpedo tubes; 8-cell Mk. 41 VLS containing/or mixture of: 32 × RIM-162 ESSM Block II in quadpacked max loadout; 8 × RUM-139C VL ASROC; Fitted for but not with SM-2MR Standard Missile
- Aircraft carried: 1 × S-70B Seahawk or MH-60S Knight hawk

The Bhumibol Adulyadej-class frigate is a class of frigates operated by the Royal Thai Navy. The design is a variant of the Republic of Korea Navy's Gwanggaeto the Great-class destroyer design, with additional stealth features. This is the first ship in the High-Performance Frigate Boat Project of the Royal Thai Navy. It is able to perform 3D combat operations on surface, underwater and air.

The lead ship of the class, named HTMS Bhumibol Adulyadej, was constructed in South Korea. It was commissioned on 7 January 2019, with the original name as HTMS Tha Chin. It was subsequently renamed HTMS Bhumibol Adulyadej.

== Ships in class ==
Name	Hull no.	Builder	Laid down	Launched	Commissioned	Status
HTMS Bhumibol Adulyadej	FFG-471	Daewoo Shipbuilding & Marine Engineering	15 May 2016	23 January 2017	7 January 2019	Active
HTMS Ananda Mahidol	FFG-472					Postponed

== See also ==
- List of naval ship classes in service
- List of equipment of the Royal Thai Navy
