= 2012 (Mukimukimanmansu album) =

Studio album by Mukimukimanmansu
- Released: April 27, 2012
- Genres: Freak folk, indie rock
- Length: 31:00
- Label: Beat Ball Records

2012 is the first and only studio album by South Korean indie rock band Mukimukimanmansu. The album was released on 27 April 2012.

== Background ==
Mukimukimanmansu formed in 2011 and were one of the first indie bands to achieve the top spot in Naver's real-time search terms. Numerous media outlets described them as a "menboong (Korean: 멘붕, South Korean Internet slang for mental breakdown)" band and noted the unique chorus of one of their songs, "Andromeda." The song later became the album's first track.

== Critical reception ==
Professional ratings
Review scores
Source	Rating
IZM	2/5 stars

Kim Banya of IZM described the album as "the definition of indie music is being broken down." Park Joohyeok of Weiv reviewed "In all areas, 'internality', 'magic', and 'primitive local characteristics' appear evenly. At this point, even if it is a bizarre item, it is worth having a variety of special items. So this album, it's definitely a good acid folk album." Nominating 2012 for best modern rock album, Lee Minhee, a member of the selection committee for the Korean Music Awards, said, "They are a very unusual band that reminds people not to overuse the expression 'ingenuity.'"

== Track listing ==
All songs are by Mukimukimanmansu except track 5, which is by Kim Chang-wan

No.	Title	Length
1.	"Andromeda" ("안드로메다")	1:31
2.	"Type 7" ("7번 유형")	2:28
3.	"Seokgwan-Dong, 2008" ("2008년 석관동")	3:00
4.	"Head Size" ("머리 크기")	3:10
5.	"If I Confess, Be Totally Surprised" ("내가 고백을 하면 깜짝 놀랄 거야")	2:37
6.	"Namsan Tower" ("남산타워")	1:34
7.	"I'm a Taxi Driver in Paris" ("나는 빠리의 택시 운전사")	2:30
8.	"The Pyromaniac" ("방화범")	3:12
9.	"Botanical Garden" ("식물원")	3:49
10.	"Your Present" ("너의 선물")	2:35
11.	"Mukimukimanmansu" ("무키무키만만수")	2:50
12.	"Struggle and Diet" ("투쟁과 다이어트")	1:44
