= Jeju Naval Base controversy =

There was much controversy during the construction of Jeju Naval Base (Korean: 제주 해군기지; Hanja: 濟州海軍基地), which is a joint civil and Republic of Korea Navy base constructed by the South Korean government in Gangjeong village on the southern coast of Jeju Island (coterminous with Jeju Province, or Jeju-do), South Korea.

By 2011, construction had been halted seven times by protesters concerned about the base's environmental impact and who saw it as a US-driven project aimed at China, rather than enhancing South Korean defense. In July 2012, the South Korean Supreme Court upheld the base's construction. It is expected to host up to 20 military vessels and occasional civilian cruise ships.

== Background and rationale ==
The plan was first announced in 1993 during the Kim Young Sam presidency. During the Roh Moo-hyun presidency, the southwestern villages of Hwasun and Wimi were considered potential sites of construction. In 2007, Gangjeong village, located on the southern coast of Jeju Island, was designated as the official site. Two days after former village chief Yoon Tae-Jun announced his approval for the naval base construction on April 24, 2007, a vote was held on April 26, 2007, during which only 87 of the over 1,000 eligible voters were present. Ignoring local voting protocol, the motion was passed based on clapping.

The base was chosen for its strategic forward location that could provide rapid response to any type of activity in the neighboring seas shared with China and Japan, along with protecting the vital Korean shipping lanes through which 99% of Korean exports and all oil imports flow. A 2012 editorial in The Dong-a Ilbo, made the case for the base in the context of maritime disputes with China over claims to the Socotra Rock, which South Korea claims lies within its exclusive economic zone: "... the planned naval base on Jeju Island is a must ... If disputes arise over Ieo [i.e. the Socotra Rock], the South Korean Navy should respond to them." The editorial noted that naval response time to the Socotra Rock from the base in Busan is 23 hours versus eight hours from Jeju and went on to observe: "The naval base is also essential to protecting the Jeju sea route, where more than 90 percent of inbound and outbound maritime freight passes." Jeju provincial council representative, Park Weon-cheol (박원철), discussed how the naval base can be potentially used as an aircraft carrier base.

According to South Korean defense officials, the base is a multipurpose joint civilian-military project and will not allow permanent stationing of American or other foreign naval vessels. In 2011, South Korea's then-deputy chief of naval operations, Rear Admiral Koo Ok-hyoe, indicated that the base "is meant to deter North Korea, not China" and will not host a US missile defense system. In 2013, the South Korean government denied reports that it plans to participate in the US missile defense program but this does not include South Korean guided missile destroyers equipped with the US-made Aegis Combat System, which will be based in Jeju. (Note: The Aegis Combat System is distinct from the Aegis Ballistic Missile Defense (BMD) system, the naval component of the US Missile Defense Agency's (MDA) Ballistic Missile Defense System. According to the MDA, Japan is the only foreign country to have purchased or deployed the Aegis BMD.)

== Environmental impact ==
The coastline surrounding Gangjeong Village consists of one contiguous volcanic rock. The estuary is Jeju Island's only rocky wetland and acts as home to several endangered species and soft coral reefs. In 1991, the Jeju Provincial government designated the coastline surrounding Gangjeong Village an Absolute Conservation Area (ACA). In 2002, the area where the naval base construction is currently ongoing was designated a UNESCO Biosphere Conservation Area. In December 2009, Jeju Island Governor Kim Tae-hwan nullified the ACA designation to proceed with the naval base construction. The Jeju Branch of the Korean Federation of Environmental Movements have criticized the Navy's Environmental Impact Assessment noting that several endangered species are absent from the report.

During its recent archeological excavation of the Gangjeong coastal area the Jeju Cultural Heritage Research Institute discovered artifacts dating back to 4-2 B.C.E. inside the naval base construction zone. According to the director of the Korean Cultural Heritage Policy Research Institute only 10 – 20% of the site has been excavated and the naval base construction violates cultural properties protection law.

== Protests, reactions and recent developments ==
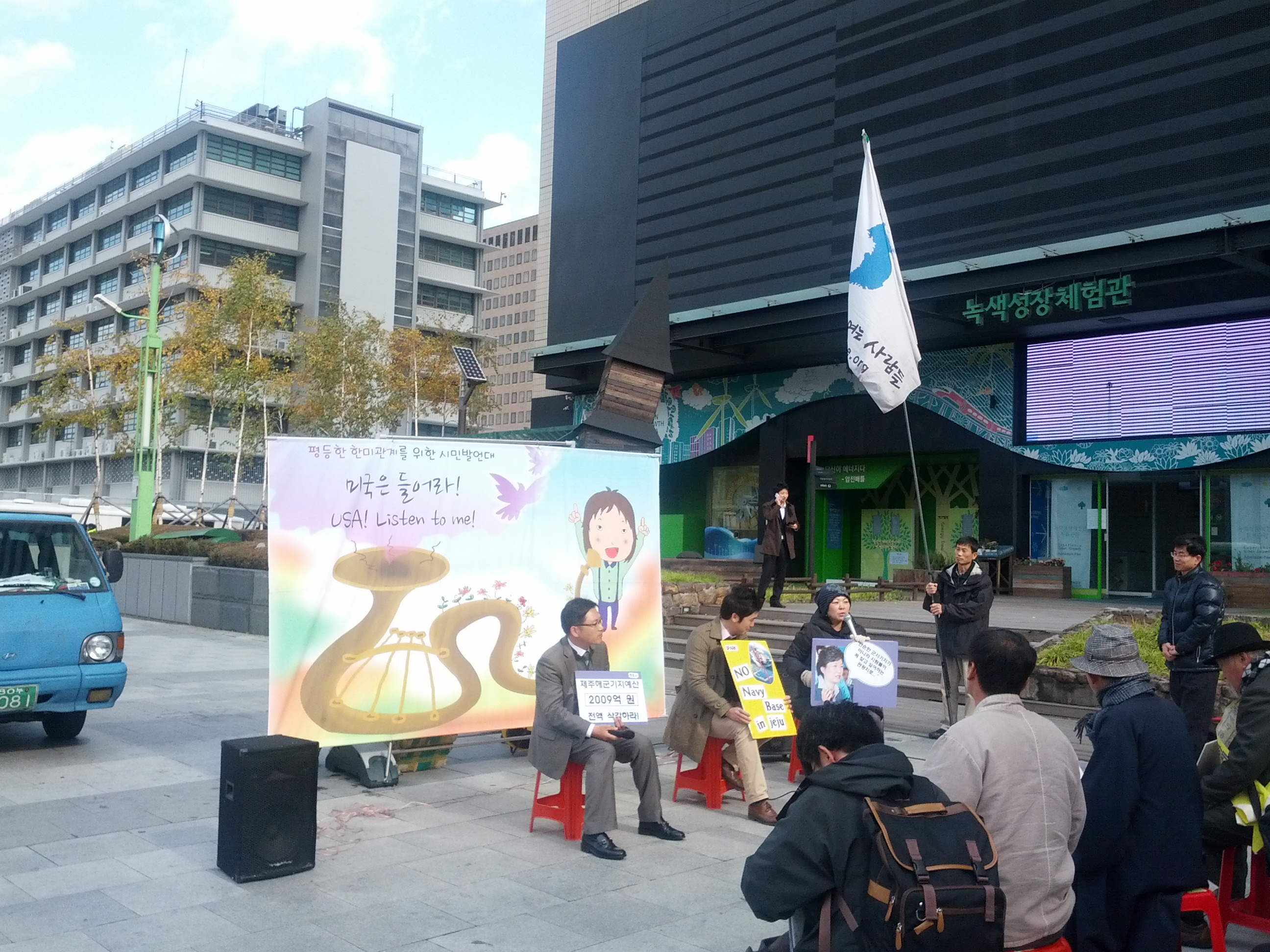
Rally near the U.S. Embassy in downtown Seoul against the planned Jeju-do Naval Base

A recent statement to the International Union for Conservation of Nature signed by a number of leading academics and well known figures including Vandana Shiva, Walden Bello, David Suzuki, Noam Chomsky, Gloria Steinem and Robert Redford cites police brutality and claims that over 500 people have been arrested thus far. The protesters have staged rallies to stop the naval base construction despite these actions being ruled illegal by the Jeju courts. Protestors include resident villagers, other Jeju Islanders, mainland activists, international peace activists, leading figures from various religious orders, women's rights and environmental organizations, and opposition politicians, among others. International human rights organizations including Amnesty International have condemned indiscriminate arrests of protestors by the police and the alleged hiring of "thugs" by construction companies.

Writing in The Diplomat in 2013, professor Andrew Yeo of Catholic University argued most South Koreans do not support the protesters, rejecting their cause as a case of either NIMBYism or "a politically motivated agenda driven by leftist activists and opposition party members."

=== 2011 ===
In June 2011, protesters staged a sit in on the construction future site, halting construction for several months. They were not cleared out until September 2, 2011.

A press conference was held in the Jeju Special Self-governing Provincial Council on October 4, 2011, where protesters such as university students and religious figures shared episodes of harassment they faced at the hand of members of the ROK Navy Ship Salvage Unit.

=== 2012 ===
On March 6, 2012, Han Myeong-sook, leader of the opposition Democratic United Party, traveled to the base site to protest its construction saying: "... we need to completely re-examine the construction of the naval base" and "The Roh Moo-hyun government had planned to create a civilian-military base, but the incumbent government is pushing to build a naval base." Editorializing on this event, the Dong-a Ilbo, a leading South Korean newspaper, quoted then-Prime Minister Han speaking in the National Assembly in February 2007: "The Jeju Island naval base is inevitably needed to foster the Navy and secure sea routes to the south." The same unsigned editorial quoted then-President Roh at the Jeju Peace Forum in June 2007: "The Navy is necessary to protect Jeju and the Jeju naval base is a preventive one."

On March 8, 2012, nineteen law school students from Seoul National University protested the construction over concerns the construction is destroying the natural marine habitat around Gureombi rocks (구럼비 바위) near the Gangjeong village.

The proportional representative candidate from the Unified Progressive Party, Kim Ji-yoon, called the planned naval base a pirate base. Writer Gong Ji-young has also supported her statement. The statement received nationwide criticism, and Kim Ji-yoon was blasted for her criticism. The South Korean Navy and other politicians threatened to sue Kim, and some of Kim's fellow opponents even denounced her comments.

On March 11, a 20,000-ton barge that used for the construction was pushed by strong winds, and sank two fishing boats.

Law School professor Dr. Yong-in Shin (신용인) of Jeju National University claimed construction violates several provisions of the third Article of Technological Standards of Constructing Harbors (항만시설의 기술기준에 관한 규칙 제3조).

In July 2012, the ROK Supreme Court ruled the construction of the base legal, despite the fact the government began construction before examining environmental risk assessment reports.

=== 2013 ===
In August 2013, one thousand demonstrators, including filmmaker Oliver Stone, participated in the Grand March for Life and Peace and the Human Chain that encircled the base. In a brief interview with reporters, Stone said his opposition to the base comes down to his fear that another Pacific war is brewing: "This base will host US Aegis missile destroyers, aircraft carriers, nuclear submarines. It's part of Obama's Pacific pivot...put in place to threaten China...We have to stop this. All this is leading up to a war, and I've seen war in Asia. I do not want another war."

=== 2014 ===
On April 7, 2014, tensions between the South Korean government and the local Catholic community, who have been protesting the base for years, came to a head. Two priests, a nun and a lay Catholic in the Diocese of Cheju were arrested on charges of "interfering with police business." The nun, Sister Roserina, and the lay Catholic, Lee Jonghwa, were released later that day, but the two priests, Jesuit Fr Kim Seunghwan and Fr Junghyun, were held until April 9, 2014. This instance was not the first time members of the Catholic community have clashed with local authorities. Recent events include September 3, 2011, when two priests were arrested and January 2012 when twenty nuns and a priest were arrested for "praying for peace outside the gates of the naval construction."

=== 2015 ===
On April 3, 2015, DPRK officials commemorated the 67th anniversary of the Jeju uprising by calling on South Koreans to oppose the United States's military presence in their country. In addition to urging South Koreans to "hold in their hearts the deeds of Jeju insurgents," DPRK officials declared that the naval base under construction at Gangjeong village is proof that Jeju Island is still under "imperial rule."

On July 31, 2015, the ROK defense procurement agency announced that the Korean Commercial Arbitration Board ordered the Korean Navy to pay Samsung C&T Corp., a contractor working on the base, 7.3 billion won (US$23.2 million) because of delays. In 2010, Samsung C&T Corp. was contracted to build two piers for the naval base to accommodate cruise ships, but due to severe protests, construction did not get underway until 2012.

On October 26, 2015, ROK Navy officials announced that the base, now 91% complete, would open as early as December 1, 2015, with official ceremonies planned for sometime between mid-December and early January. The officials also said that when the Jeju Naval Base opens, the Navy's 7th Task Flotilla and part of the Submarine Force Command will be relocated there from Busan and Jinhae, South Gyeongsang Province, respectively. After the base opens, an estimated 3,000 naval personnel and their families will be stationed at the base.

=== 2016 ===
The base, now named the Jeju Civilian-Military Complex Port was officially opened on February 26, 2016.

== International reactions ==
The "International Interfaith Solidarity" and Veterans For Peace expressed concerns about the naval base. They believe it will strengthen the military presence of U.S. in the region and escalate the tensions between U.S. and China. In October 2011 and March 2012, two international environment activists, Angie Zelter and Benjamain Monnet, had been arrested and then deported from the country when they illegally approached the construction site. The Asian Human Rights Commission criticized South Korean police for assaulting and detaining activists. Julia Marton-Lefèvre, the Director General of the IUCN, stated that "...The Republic of Korea has the responsibility of keeping its country safe; it has equal obligations on the development of the society and economy and the protection of the environment..."

== See also ==
- Republic of Korea Navy
