= Jeju Civilian-Military Complex Port for Beautiful Tourism =

Republic of Korea Navy base

Jeju Naval Base
- 제주 해군기지
- Jeju Province in South Korea

Site information
- Type: Naval Base
- Owner: Republic of Korea
- Operator: Republic of Korea Navy
- Open to the public: No

Location
- Coordinates: 33.228°N 126.484°E

Site history
- Built: 2012-2015
- In use: 2016-present

The Jeju Civilian-Military Complex Port for Beautiful Tourism (Korean: 제주 민군복합형관광미항; Hanja: 濟州民軍複合型觀光美港) or Jeju Naval Base (제주 해군기지; 濟州海軍基地) is a joint civil and Republic of Korea Navy base constructed by the South Korean government in Gangjeong village on the southern coast of Jeju Island (coterminous with Jeju Province, or Jeju-do), South Korea. Construction of the base at a projected cost, as of 2011, of ₩977 billion or about US$907 million proved highly controversial. A poll revealed that majority a residents of Jeju island wanted to have a referendum about the construction of the base. By 2011, construction had been halted seven times by protesters concerned about the base's environmental impact and who saw it as a US-driven project aimed at China, rather than enhancing South Korean defense. In July 2012, the South Korean Supreme Court upheld the base's construction. It can host up to 20 military vessels and occasional civilian cruise ships.

== Tourism port ==
A portion of the port complex is taken up by tourist and fishing infrastructure. There is a cruise ship terminal, a dive-school, restaurants, a coffee shop, three houses of worship, a walking path, a football pitch, and the Sunrise-Sunset Road. The Sunrise-Sunset Road has been closed since September 2022.
