= 11/9 =

11/9 may refer to:

- November 9, US and Asian style date
    - Fahrenheit 11/9, an American documentary film
- September 11, used in the day-month-year stylization of dates
  - The September 11 attacks, a series of four coordinated terrorist attacks in the United States of America on September 11, 2001
- September, 2011; see 2011
- November, 2009; see 2009
- September, 11 A.D.; see AD 11
- November, 9 A.D.; see AD 9
- 11 shillings and 9 pence in UK predecimal currency
- "11/9", an episode of American Horror Story: Cult

== See also ==
- September 11 attacks (disambiguation)
- 119 (disambiguation)
- 9/11 (disambiguation)
