= HTMS Taksin =

Naresuan-class frigate

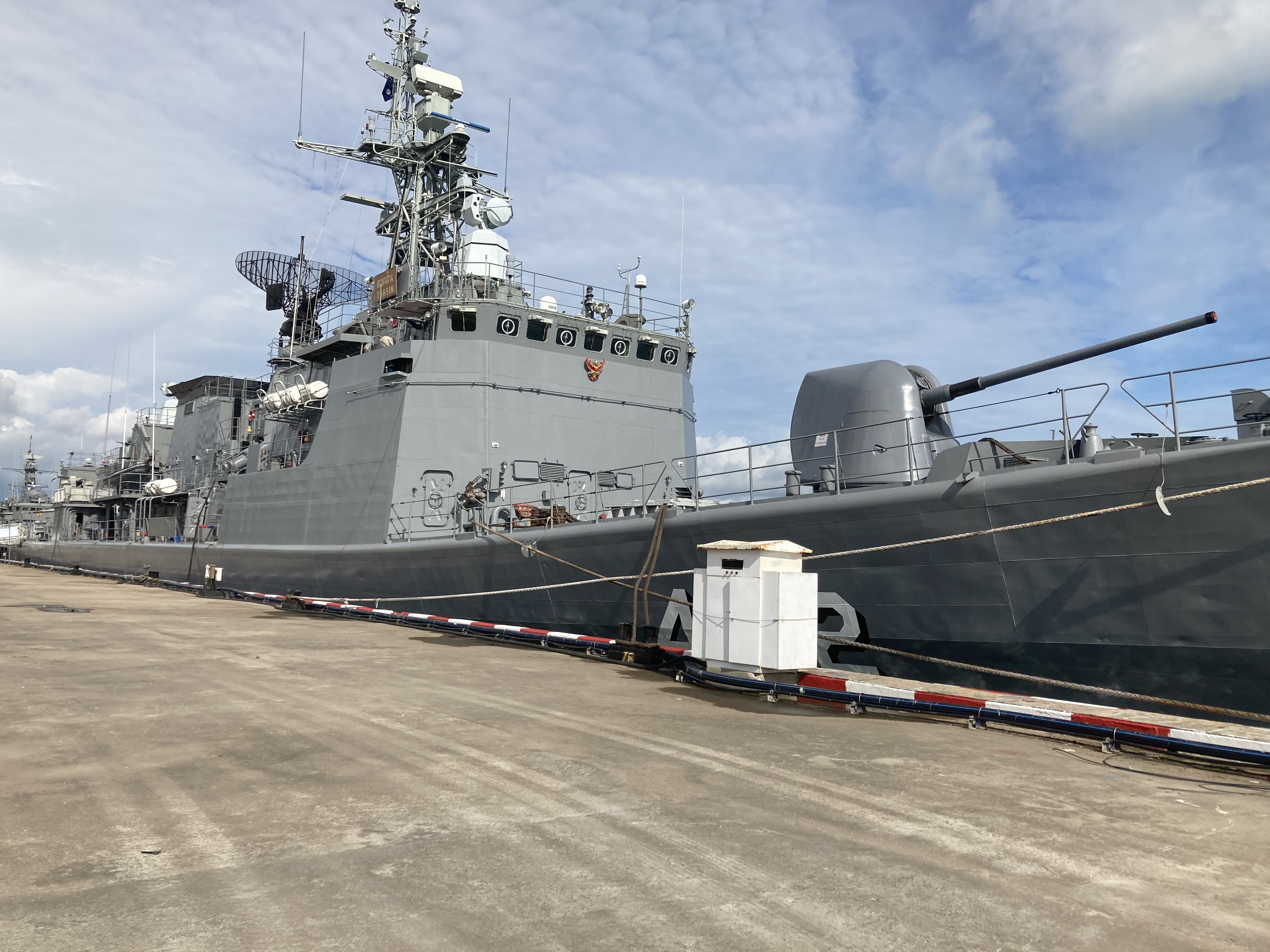
- HTMS Taksin

History

Thailand
- Name: HTMS Taksin
- Namesake: King Taksin
- Builder: China State Shipbuilding Corporation, Shanghai
- Laid down: 1991
- Launched: 1993
- Commissioned: 1995
- Status: ship in active service

General characteristics
- Type: Naresuan-class frigate
- Displacement: 2,985 tons full load
- Length: 120.5 m
- Beam: 13.7 m
- Draught: 6 m
- Propulsion: 1 × General Electric LM2500+ gas turbine and 2 × MTU 20V1163 TB83 diesel engines, driving two shafts with controllable pitch propellers in CODOG configuration.
- Speed: 32 knots (59 km/h) max
- Range: 4000 nmi(7408 km) at 18 kn
- Complement: 150
- Sensors & processing systems: Saab Sea Giraffe AMD 3D surveillance radar; Thales LW08 long range search radar; Raytheon AN/SPS-64 Navigation radar; Selex IFF SIT422CI&M425; Saab 9LV Mk.4 with Saab TIDLS combat management system; 2 × Saab Ceros 200 fire control radar; 1 x Saab EOS 500 electro-optical fire control director; Kelvin Hughes SharpEye™ radar; Atlas DSQS-24d sonar
- Electronic warfare & decoys: ESM ITT ES-3601 (AN/SLQ-4); ECM Type 984-1 noise jammer&Type 981-3 deception jammer; Decoys Terma SKWS (C-Guard)
- Armament: 1 × 5 in/54 (127 mm) Mk-45 Mod 2 naval artillery gun; 2 × 30mm MSI-DSL DS30MR automated small calibre gun; 8 cell Mk.41 vertical launch system for 32 x RIM-162 ESSM; 8 × RGM-84 Harpoon SSM launcher; 2 × triple 324 mm Mk-32 Mod.5 tubes
- Aircraft carried: 1 x Super Lynx 300

HTMS Taksin (FFG-422) (Thai: เรือหลวงตากสิน), hull number 622, commissioned in 1995, is a modified version of the Chinese-made Type 053 frigate, designed and built by the China State Shipbuilding Corporation in Shanghai. Her sister ship, HTMS Naresuan was delivered in November 1995. The ships came at 2 billion baht each, less than the 8 billion baht claimed price tag for Western-built frigates.

The Thai Navy complained of the poor quality of the ships. The ship's damage control system was very limited, with very basic fire suppression systems. It was claimed that if the ship's hull was breached, the ship would be quickly lost to flooding. The Thai Navy had to spend considerable time and effort to correct some of these issues.

== Upgrade ==
On 3 June 2011, Saab announced that it was awarded a contract for the upgrading of the two Naresuan class frigates. The scope of the upgrade will include Saab's 9LV MK4 combat management system, Sea Giraffe AMB, CEROS 200 fire control radar, EOS 500 electro-optics system and data link systems for communications with the newly acquired Royal Thai Air Force Erieye surveillance aircraft.

On 8 August 2012, DSCA announced Thailand's intention to acquire the Evolved Sea Sparrow missile and associated equipment to upgrade the frigates. A letter of offer and acceptance was signed with Raytheon on 14 January 2013.

During a network centric exercise of the Royal Thai Navy in March 2021 networked data links was established between Gripen fighters and HTMS Taksin, HTMS Naresuan and HTMS Chakri Naruebet for the first time.
