= 119 =

119 may refer to:

- 119 (number), the natural number following 118 and preceding 120
- 119 (emergency telephone number)
- AD 119, a year in the 2nd century AD
- 119 BC, a year in the 2nd century BC
- 119 (album), 2012
- 119 (NCT song)
- 119 (Show Me the Money song)
- 119, a Japanese film by Naoto Takenaka
- Route 119 (MBTA), a bus route in Massachusetts, US
- List of highways numbered 119
- 119 Althaea, a main-belt asteroid

== See also ==
- 11/9 (disambiguation)
- 911 (disambiguation)
- Ununennium, a hypothetical chemical element with atomic number 119
