= 911 =

911, 9/11 or Nine Eleven may refer to:

== Dates ==
- AD 911
- 911 BC
- September 11 (9/11 in the month/day date format)
  - The 2001 September 11 attacks on the US by al-Qaeda, commonly referred to as 9/11
  - 11 de Septiembre, Chilean coup d'état in 1973 that ousted the democratically elected Salvador Allende
  - Revolution of 11 September 1852, the revolt of the Buenos Aires Province against the government of Justo José de Urquiza
- November 9 (9/11 in the day/month date format)
  - 9 November in German history, several historical events that occurred in present-day Germany

== Numbers ==
- 911 (number)
- 911 (emergency telephone number), in countries mostly in North America
  - 911 (Philippines), an emergency telephone number in the Philippines

== Film ==
- 9/11: The Twin Towers, a 2006 documentary special about the 9/11 attacks
- 9/11 (2002 film), a documentary about the 9/11 attacks
- 9/11 (2017 film), a drama about the 9/11 attacks

== Literature ==
- 9-11 (Noam Chomsky), a collection of essays by and interviews with Noam Chomsky
- 9-11: Artists Respond, Volume One, a benefit comic published by Dark Horse Comics, Chaos! Comics, and Image Comics
- 9-11: Emergency Relief, a benefit comic published by Alternative Comics

== Music ==
=== Groups ===
- 911 (group), a boy band formed in 1995
- Nine One One (band), a Taiwanese hip hop group formed in 2009

=== Albums ===
- 9.11 (album), 2001, by Ron "Bumblefoot" Thal

=== Songs ===
- "911" (Wyclef Jean song) (2000)
- "911" (Gorillaz and D12 song) (2001)
- "911 / Mr. Lonely", 2017, by Tyler, the Creator
- "911" (Lady Gaga song) (2020)
- "911", 1986, by Cyndi Lauper from True Colors
- "911", 2012, by Rick Ross from God Forgives, I Don't
- "911", 2021, by Sech
- "Emergency (911)", 2009, by Jordin Sparks from Battlefield

== Television ==
- 9-1-1 (TV series), a 2018 American procedural drama series
- 9-1-1: Lone Star, a 2020 spinoff of 9-1-1
- 9-1-1: Nashville, a 2025 spinoff of 9-1-1
- "911" (Law & Order: Special Victims Unit), a 2005 episode of Law & Order: Special Victims Unit
- "911" (Dexter's Laboratory), a 1997 episode of Dexter's Laboratory

== Transportation ==
- Porsche 911, a series of German sports cars
- BOAC Flight 911, a flight that crashed in 1966
- HTMS Chakri Naruebet (CVH-911), an aircraft carrier of the Royal Thai Navy
- List of highways numbered 911

== Other uses ==
- 911 (wrestler), an American professional wrestler
- 911 Agamemnon, an asteroid
- 911 Battalion (SWATF), a Namibian military unit
- Leyton House CG911, a Formula One racing car
- Springfield Armory 911, a semi-automatic pistol

== See also ==
- "911 Is a Joke", a 1990 song by Public Enemy
- Reno 911!, an American comedy television series
- Reno 911!: Miami, a 2007 cop comedy movie based on the series
- Rescue 911, an CBS docudrama series based on real emergencies
- September 11 attacks (disambiguation)
- List of comics about the September 11 attacks
