= HTMS Chakri Naruebet =

Thai aircraft carrier

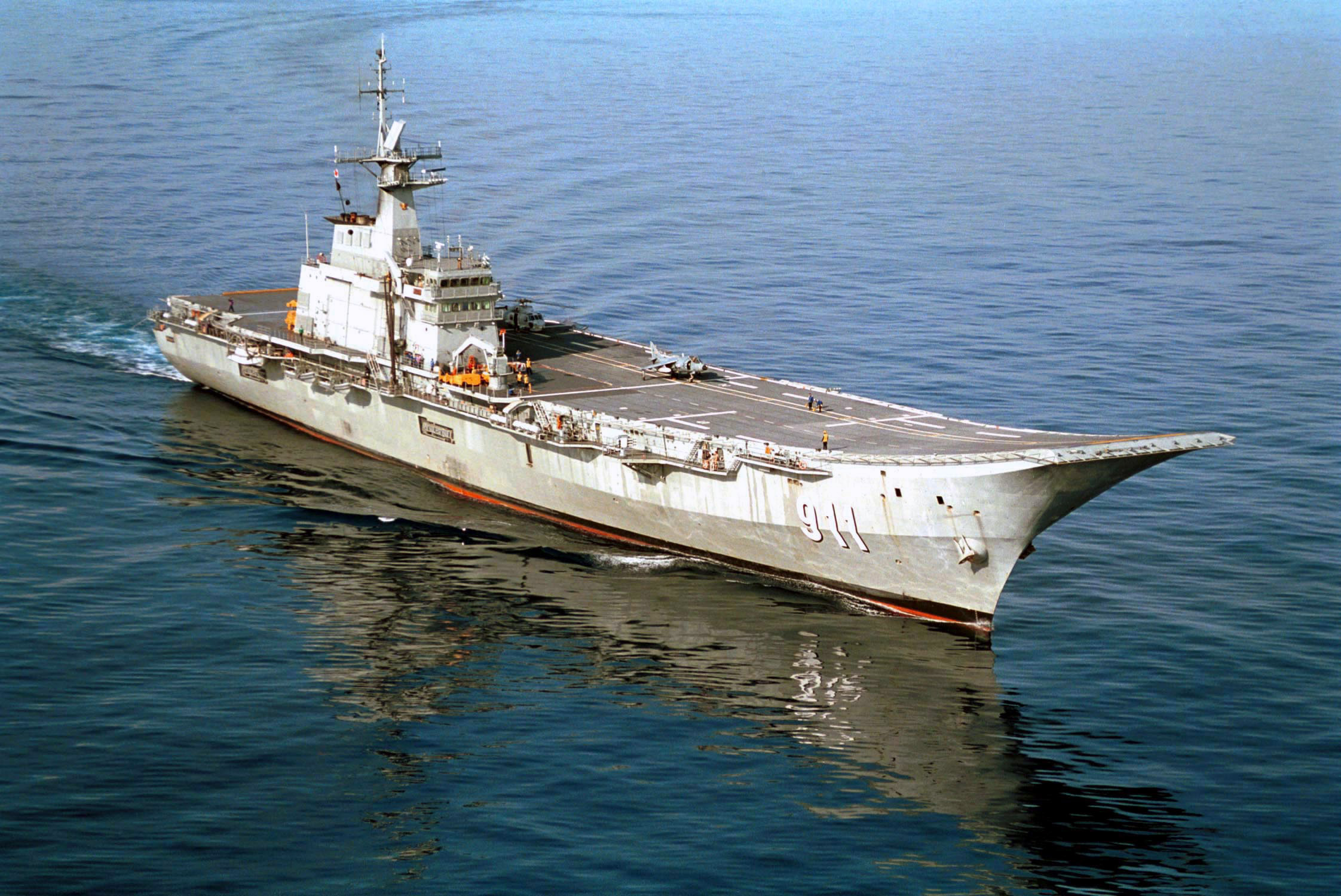
- HTMS Chakri Naruebet in the South China Sea in 2001

History

Thailand
- Name: Chakri Naruebet
- Namesake: Sovereign of the Chakri Dynasty
- Ordered: 27 March 1992
- Builder: Bazán, Ferrol, Spain
- Cost: US$285 million (1993)
- Laid down: 12 July 1994
- Launched: 20 January 1996
- Commissioned: 27 March 1997
- Home port: Sattahip Naval Base
- Identification: 911
- Motto: Rule The Sky, Rule The Sea (ครองเวหา ครองนที)
- Status: in active service
- Badge

General characteristics
- Type: Helicopter carrier (current classification); Light aircraft carrier (previous classification)
- Displacement: 11,486 long tons (11,670 t) full load
- Length: 182.65 m (599 ft 3 in) (oa); 174.1 m (571 ft 2 in) (flight deck); 164.1 m (538 ft 5 in) (pp)
- Beam: 22.5 m (73 ft 10 in) (waterline); 30.5 m (100 ft 1 in) maximum
- Draught: 6.12 m (20 ft 1 in)
- Propulsion: 2 × GE LM2500 gas turbines providing 22,125 shp (16,499 kW); 2 × Bazán-MTU 16V1163 TB83 diesel engines providing 5,600 bhp (4,200 kW); 2 × shafts with 5-bladed propellers
- Speed: 25.5 knots (47.2 km/h; 29.3 mph) (maximum)
- Range: 10,000 nmi (19,000 km; 12,000 mi) at 12 knots (22 km/h; 14 mph)
- Troops: Up to 675
- Complement: 62 officers; 393 sailors; 146 aircrew
- Sensors & processing systems: Hughes SPS-52C air search radar, E/F band; 2 × Kelvin-Hughes 1007 navigational radars
- Electronic warfare & decoys: Decoys: 4 × SRBOC decoy launchers; SLQ-32 towed decoy
- Armament: 2 × 12.7mm machine guns; 3 × sextuple Sadral launchers for Mistral surface-to-air missiles; 4 x 20mm Rheinmetall Mk 20 Rh-202 autocannons
- Aircraft carried: 6 Sikorsky SH-60 Seahawk helicopters; 2 (+4) MH-60S Knighthawk; Up to 14 additional helicopters when required
- Aviation facilities: 174.6-by-27.5-metre (573 by 90 ft) flight deck; 12° ski-jump; Hangar space for 10 aircraft

HTMS Chakri Naruebet (911) (Thai: เรือหลวงจักรีนฤเบศร, meaning 'Sovereign of the Chakri Dynasty', the Thai monarchy's ruling family) is the flagship of the Royal Thai Navy (RTN), and Thailand's first and only aircraft carrier, although the RTN refers to her as an "Offshore Patrol Helicopter Carrier". Based on the Spanish Navy's Príncipe de Asturias design and constructed by Spanish shipbuilder Bazán, Chakri Naruebet was ordered in 1992, laid down in 1994, launched in 1996, and commissioned into the RTN in 1997. The ship is the smallest functioning aircraft carrier in the world (currently only operates helicopters).

The aircraft carrier was designed to operate an air group of V/STOL fighter aircraft and helicopters, and is fitted with an aircraft ski-jump. Initial intentions were to operate a mixed air group of ex-Spanish AV-8S Matador Harrier V/STOL aircraft and Sikorsky SH-60 Seahawk helicopters. However, by 1999 it was reported that only one Matador was operational due to parts, training, and fiscal limitations, although three Matadors were spotted on the ship during a show of force after the 29 January 2003 Phnom Penh riots in Cambodia. Her entire Matador jet fleet was removed from service in 2006. Although Chakri Naruebet was intended for patrols and force projection in Thai waters, a lack of funding brought on by the 1997 Asian financial crisis meant the carrier has spent most of her career docked at the Sattahip naval base.

Chakri Naruebet has been deployed on several disaster relief operations, including in the aftermath of the 2004 Indian Ocean earthquake and tsunami, and in response to separate flooding incidents in late-2010 and early-2011.

== Design ==
The original plan was to acquire a 7,800-long-ton (7,900 t) vessel from Bremer Vulcan, but the Thai government cancelled this contract on 22 July 1991. A new contract for a larger warship to be constructed at Bazán's shipyard in Ferrol, Spain was signed by the Thai and Spanish governments on 27 March 1992. The proposed vessel was based on the design of the Spanish Navy aircraft carrier Príncipe de Asturias, which in turn was based on the United States Navy's Sea Control Ship concept. The design is formally referred to by the RTN as an "Offshore Patrol Helicopter Carrier".

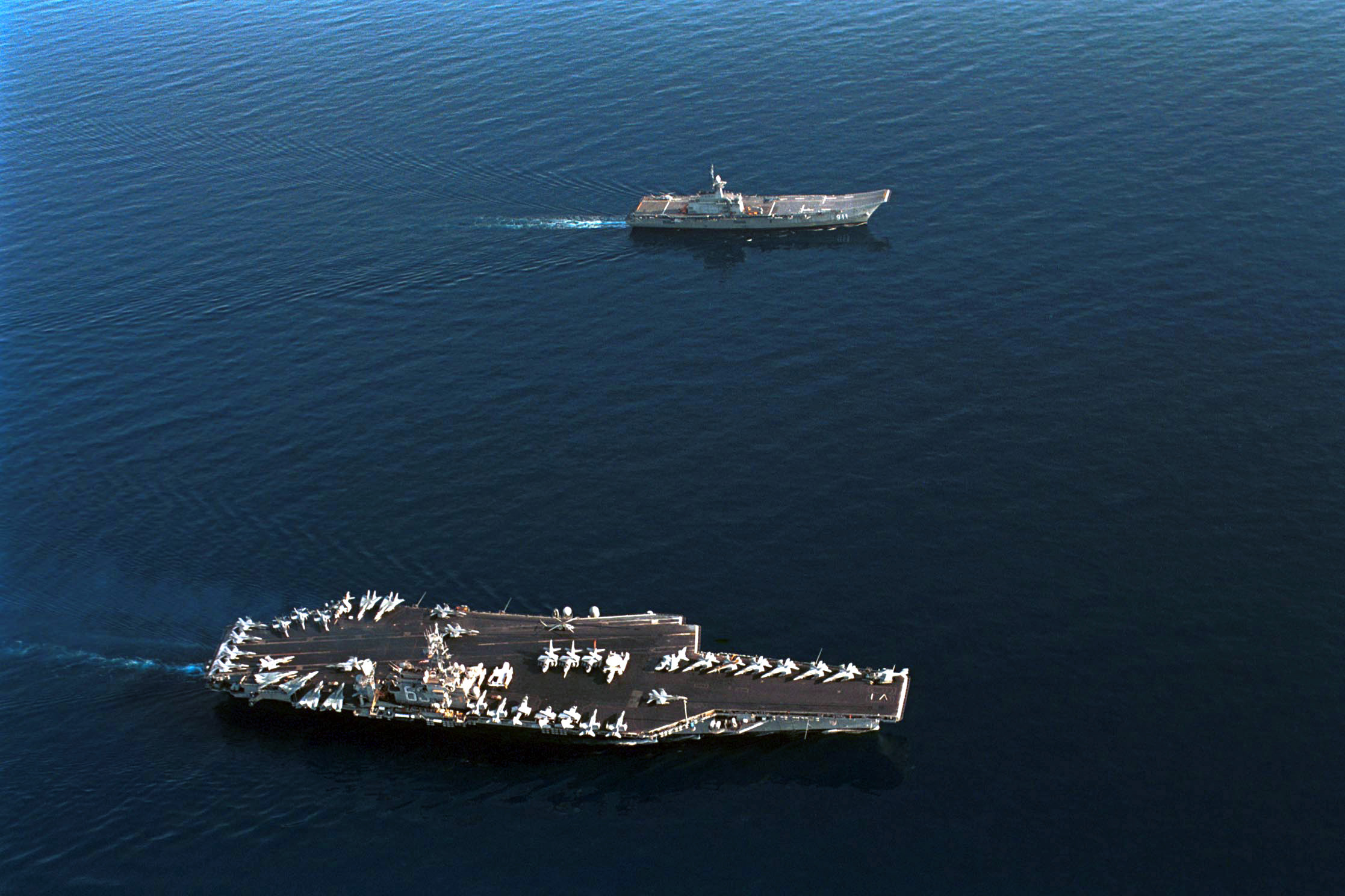
Chakri Naruebet (top) underway with the United States Navy supercarrier USS Kitty Hawk

Chakri Naruebet while still operating with Matadors was the smallest aircraft carrier with a fixed wing air group in operation in the world. She displaces 11,486 long tons (11,670 t) at full load. The carrier is 164.1 metres (538 ft 5 in) long between perpendiculars, and 182.65 metres (599 ft 3 in) overall. She is 22.5 metres (73 ft 10 in) wide at the waterline, with a maximum beam of 30.5 metres (100 ft 1 in), and a draught of 6.12 metres (20 ft 1 in). The warship has a ship's company of 62 officers, 393 sailors, and 146 aircrew. Up to 675 additional personnel can be transported, usually from the Royal Thai Marine Corps.

Chakri Naruebet is propelled by a combined diesel or gas (CODOG) system. Each of the two, five-bladed propellers is connected to a Bazán-MTU 16V1163 TB83 diesel engine (providing 5,600 brake horsepower (4,200 kW), used for cruising speed), and a General Electric LM2500 gas turbine (providing 22,125 shaft horsepower (16,499 kW), used to reach top speed for short periods). Chakri Naruebet has a maximum speed of 25.5 knots (47.2 km/h; 29.3 mph), although she can only reach 17.2 knots (31.9 km/h; 19.8 mph) with the diesels alone. She has a maximum range of 10,000 nautical miles (19,000 km; 12,000 mi) with a constant speed of 12 knots (22 km/h; 14 mph), and 7,150 nautical miles (13,240 km; 8,230 mi) at 16.5 knots (30.6 km/h; 19.0 mph).

=== Armament and aircraft ===
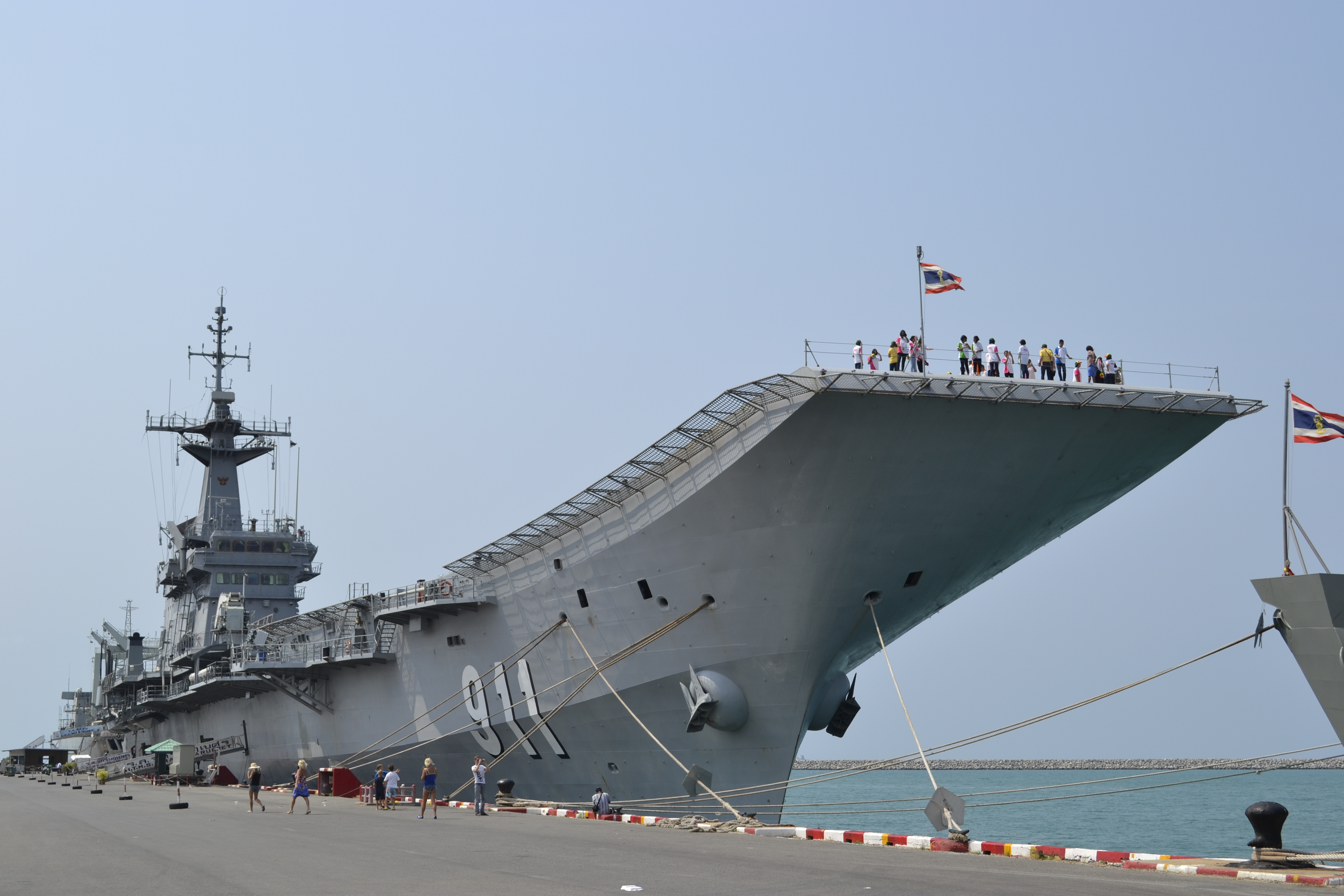
HTMS Chakri Naruebet at Sattahip Naval Base

Chakri Naruebet is fitted with two .50-caliber machine guns, four 20 mm autocannons and three Matra Sadral sextuple surface-to-air missile launchers firing Mistral missiles. The missile launchers were installed in 2001. The vessel is also fitted for but not with an 8-cell Mark 41 vertical launch system for Sea Sparrow missiles, and four Phalanx close-in weapon systems. The carrier reportedly does not have a functioning anti-aircraft defense system installed.

The carrier was designed to operate an air group of up to six AV-8S Matador V/STOL aircraft, plus four to six S-70B Seahawk helicopters. Chakri Naruebet is also capable of carrying up to fourteen additional helicopters; a mix of Sikorsky Sea King, Sikorsky S-76, and CH-47 Chinook. There is only enough hangar space for ten aircraft.

The Matador was a first-generation export version of the Hawker Siddeley Harrier, acquired secondhand from the Spanish Navy in 1997. The nine Spanish aircraft (seven standard versions plus two TAV-8S trainer aircraft) were refurbished by Construcciones Aeronáuticas SA firm before delivery. By 1999, only one aircraft was operational, and the RTN was looking for other first-generation Harriers to cannibalize for spares. In 2003, the RTN attempted to acquire several second-generation, ex-Royal Navy Sea Harrier FA2 aircraft from British Aerospace, but the deal did not go ahead. The inoperative Matadors were finally eliminated from service lists in 2006.

The flight deck measures 174.6 by 27.5 metres (572 ft 10 in by 90 ft 3 in). A 12° ski-jump assists V/STOL aircraft to take off. There are two aircraft lifts, each capable of lifting 20 tons.

=== Sensors and countermeasures ===
The sensor suite of Chakri Naruebet consists of a Hughes SPS-52C air search radar operating on the E/F band, and two Kelvin-Hughes 1007 navigational radars. There are provisions to install an SPS-64 surface search radar and a hull-mounted sonar, but neither has been fitted as of 2008. Fire control facilities are also yet to be fitted.

The carrier is equipped with four SRBOC decoy launchers, and an SLQ-25 towed decoy.

In April 2012 Saab won a contract to upgrade Chakri Naruebet's command and control systems. This will include fitting a 9LV Mk4 command and control system to the ship as well as a Sea Giraffe AMB radar and improved datalinks.

During a network-centric exercise of the Royal Thai Navy in March 2021 networked data links were established between Gripen fighters and HTMS Chakri Naruebet, HTMS Naresuan and HTMS Taksin for the first time.

== Construction ==
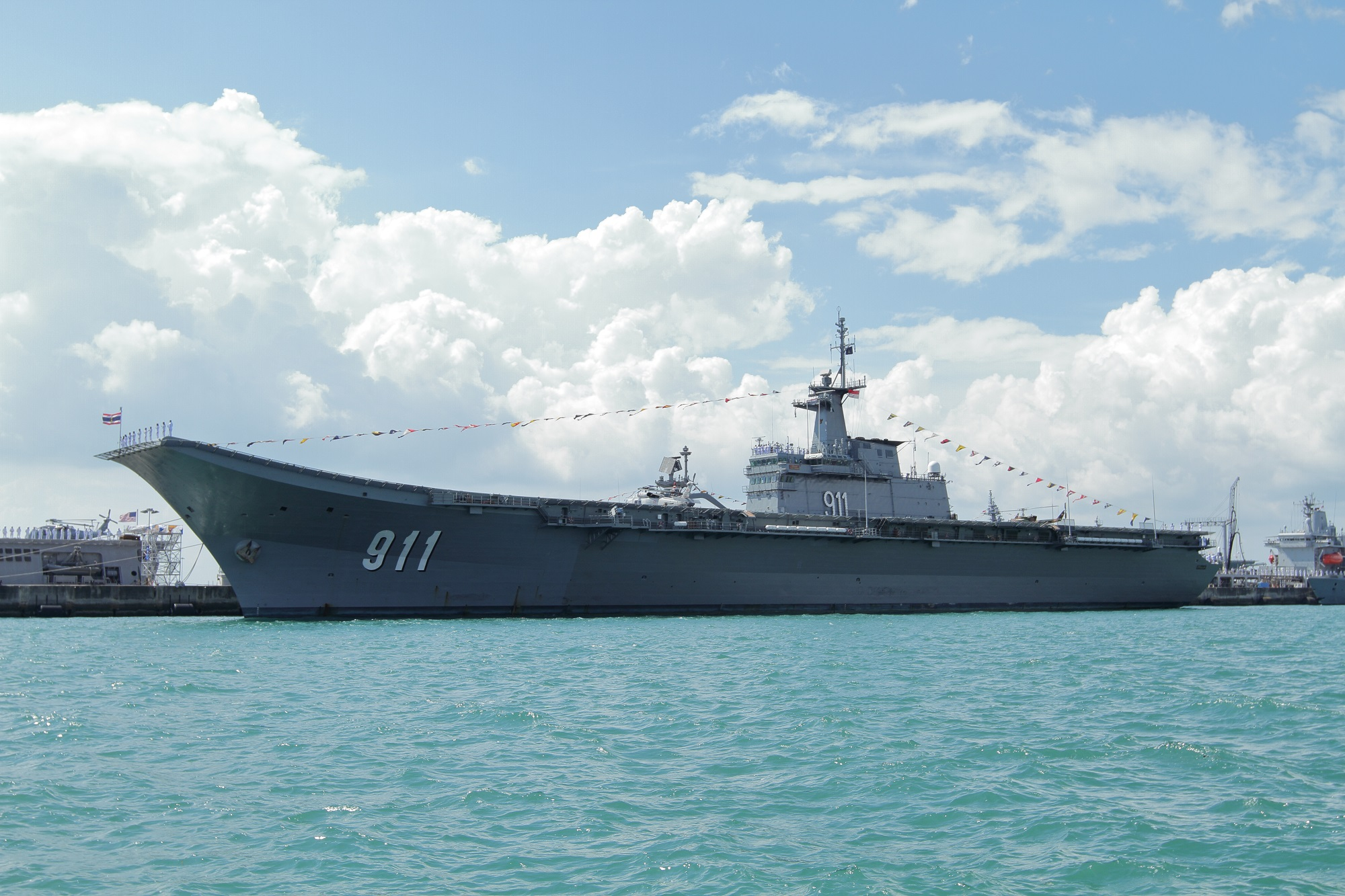
HTMS Chakri Naruebet at Changi Naval Base for International Maritime Review

Work on the Thai carrier commenced in October 1993, although it was not until 12 July 1994 that the hull was laid down. Chakri Naruebet was launched on 20 January 1996 by Queen Sirikit. Chakri Naruebet cost US$336 million to build.

Sea trials were conducted from October 1996 to January 1997, the latter part of which was in coordination with the Spanish Navy. This was followed by aviation trials at Rota, Spain. The carrier was handed over on 27 March 1997, when she was commissioned into the RTN. She arrived at Phuket on 4 August 1997 following a 42-day voyage from Spain, and formally entered service on 10 August.

== Role and operational history ==
Chakri Naruebet is the first aircraft carrier to be operated by a Southeast Asian nation. She is assigned to the Third Naval Area Command, and her intended duties include operational support of the RTN's amphibious warfare forces, patrols and force projection around Thailand's coastline and economic exclusion zone, disaster relief and humanitarian missions and search-and-rescue (SAR) operations. However, at the time the carrier entered service, the 1997 Asian financial crisis prevented the necessary funding to operate the ship from being available. Consequently, Chakri Naruebet was usually only operational for a single day per month for training, with the rest of the time spent alongside as a "part-time tourist attraction". The struggles continued for years, but it is increasingly common for her to participate in a maritime exercise or joint forces exercise; these have included PASSEX, CARAT, Guardian Sea and Cobra Gold. She was also sent for a fleet review such as the 2017 International Maritime Review in Singapore.

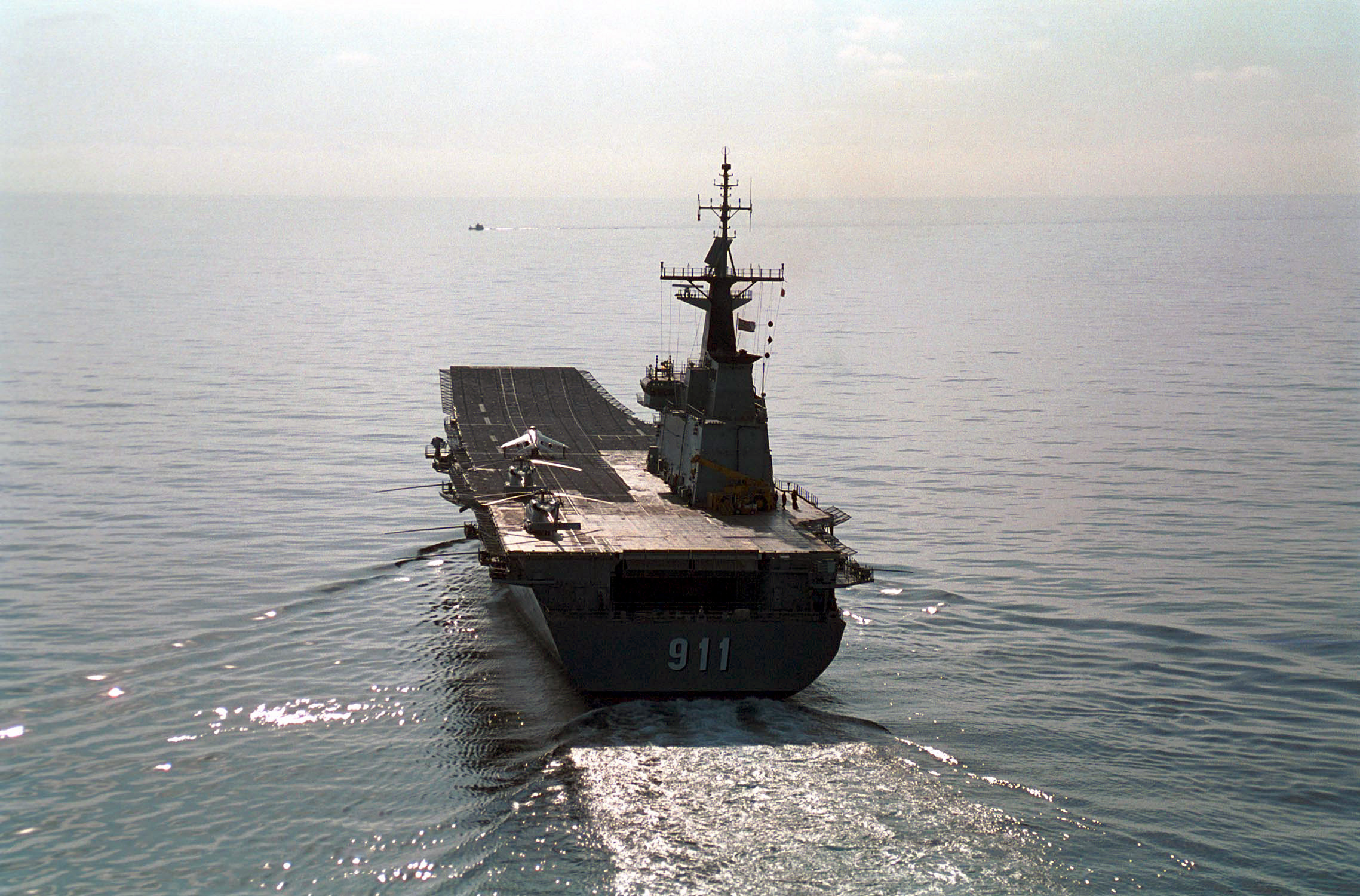
Stern view of Chakri Naruebet near the coast of Thailand

Between 4 and 7 November 1997, Chakri Naruebet participated in disaster relief operations following the passage of Tropical Storm Linda across the Gulf of Thailand and the Kra Isthmus. The carrier's main task was to search for and assist any fishing vessels affected by the storm.

Flooding in the Songkhla Province resulted in the carrier's mobilisation in late November 2000. Chakri Naruebet was anchored at an island marina off Songkhla, and used as a base for helicopters and small boats transporting food, supplies and the wounded.

In January 2003 after the burning of the Royal Thai Embassy in Cambodia, she was sent for her only "show of force" type mission to date; as an "insurance" policy for the Pochentong-1 evacuation plan.

Following an undersea earthquake in the Indian Ocean, tsunamis struck multiple regions around the Indian Ocean, including the Andaman Sea coast of Thailand. The personnel of Chakri Naruebet were part of a 760-strong response by the Thai military to the disaster. This task force was involved in search-and-rescue around Phuket and the Phi Phi Islands, treatment of wounded and handling of dead and repair work to schools and government facilities.

In November 2010, the ship was involved in flood relief operations following the 2010 Thai floods; anchored off Songkhla Province, relief supplies and food were airlifted to people in the region, while hospital patients were evacuated by the ship's helicopters. Chakri Naruebet was sent to Ko Tao in late-March during the 2011 Southern Thailand floods, as the heavy storms causing the flooding had isolated the island, requiring the evacuation of tourists and local citizens.

In 2021 it was reported that Chakri Naruebet usually spends only a day each month at sea, though it had recently sailed through the Singapore Strait. The ship is open to tourists when it is docked at its home port.

== See also ==
- List of naval ship classes in service
