= HTMS Naresuan =

1993 Thai naval frigate

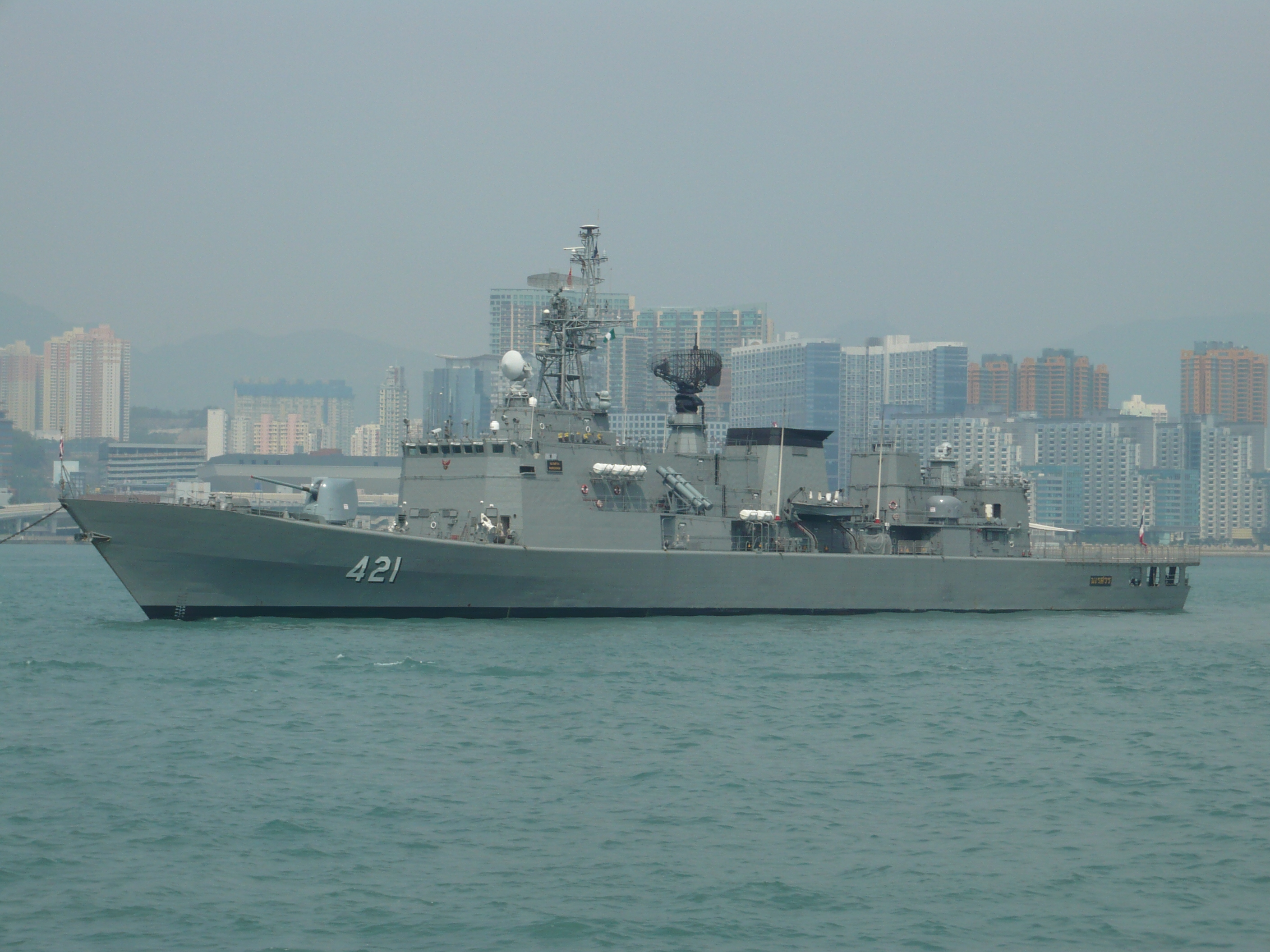
- Frigate Naresuan (FFG 421)

History

Thailand
- Name: HTMS Naresuan
- Namesake: King Naresuan
- Builder: China State Shipbuilding Corporation, Shanghai
- Laid down: 1991
- Launched: July 1993
- Commissioned: 15 December 1994
- Status: In service

General characteristics
- Class & type: Naresuan-class frigate
- Displacement: 2,985 tons full load
- Length: 120.5 m (395 ft 4 in)
- Beam: 13.7 m (44 ft 11 in)
- Draught: 6 m (19 ft 8 in)
- Propulsion: 1 × General Electric LM2500+ gas turbine and 2 × MTU 20V1163 TB83 diesel engines, driving two shafts with controllable pitch propellers in CODOG configuration
- Speed: 32 knots (59 km/h; 37 mph) max
- Range: 4,000 nmi (7,400 km; 4,600 mi) at 18 kn (33 km/h; 21 mph)
- Complement: 150
- Sensors & processing systems: Saab Sea Giraffe AMD 3D surveillance radar; Thales LW08 long range search radar; Raytheon AN/SPS-64 Navigation radar; Selex IFF SIT422CI&M425; Saab 9LV Mk4 combat management system with Saab TIDLS and Saab Tacticall integrated communications system; 2 × Saab Ceros 200 fire control radar; 1 x Saab EOS 500 electro-optical fire control director; Kelvin Hughes SharpEye™ radar; Atlas DSQS-24d sonar
- Electronic warfare & decoys: ESM ITT ES-3601 (AN/SLQ-4); ECM Type 984-1 noise jammer&Type 981-3 deception jammer; Decoys Terma SKWS (C-Guard)
- Armament: 1 × 5 in/54 (127 mm) Mk-45 Mod 2 naval artillery gun; 2 × 30mm MSI-DSL DS30MR automated small calibre gun; 8 cell Mk.41 vertical launch system for 32 x RIM-162 ESSM; 8 × RGM-84 Harpoon SSM launcher; 2 × triple 324 mm Mk-32 Mod.5 tubes
- Aircraft carried: 1 x Super Lynx 300

HTMS Naresuan (FFG-421) (Thai: เรือหลวงนเรศวร), commissioned in 1995, is a modified version of the Chinese-made Type 053 frigate, corporately designed between Royal Thai Navy and China but built by the China State Shipbuilding Corporation in Shanghai. Her sister ship, HTMS Taksin was delivered in November 1995. The ships cost 2 billion baht each.

Upon delivery, The Royal Thai Navy complained of the poor quality of the ship. The ship's damage control system was very limited, with very basic fire suppression systems. It was claimed that if the ship's hull was breached, the ship would quickly be lost to flooding. The Thai Navy had to spend considerable time and effort to correct some of these issues.

== Upgrade ==
On 3 June 2011, Saab announced that it had been awarded a contract for the upgrading of the two Naresuan-class frigates. The scope of the upgrade included Saab's 9LV MK4 combat management system, Sea Giraffe AMB, CEROS 200 fire control radar, EOS 500 electro-optics system and data link systems for communications with the newly acquired Royal Thai Air Force Erieye surveillance aircraft.

On 8 August 2012, DSCA announced Thailand's intention to acquire the Evolved Sea Sparrow (ESSM) missile and associated equipment to upgrade the frigates and a Letter of Offer and Acceptance was signed with Raytheon on 14 January 2013.

== Service history ==
On 30 August 2015, the ESSM was fired from Naresuan during Exercise CARAT 2015.

During a network centric exercise of the Royal Thai Navy in March 2021 networked data links were established between Gripen fighters and Naresuan, HTMS Taksin and HTMS Chakri Naruebet for the first time.

On 23 May 2022, Naresuan and Chao Phraya-class frigates Bangpakong and Kraburi participated in the 28th Annual CARAT exercise with the US Navy's 7th Fleet.

In March 2026, the ship participated in the Royal Australian Navy's Exercise Kakadu Fleet Review on Sydney Harbour.

== Gallery ==
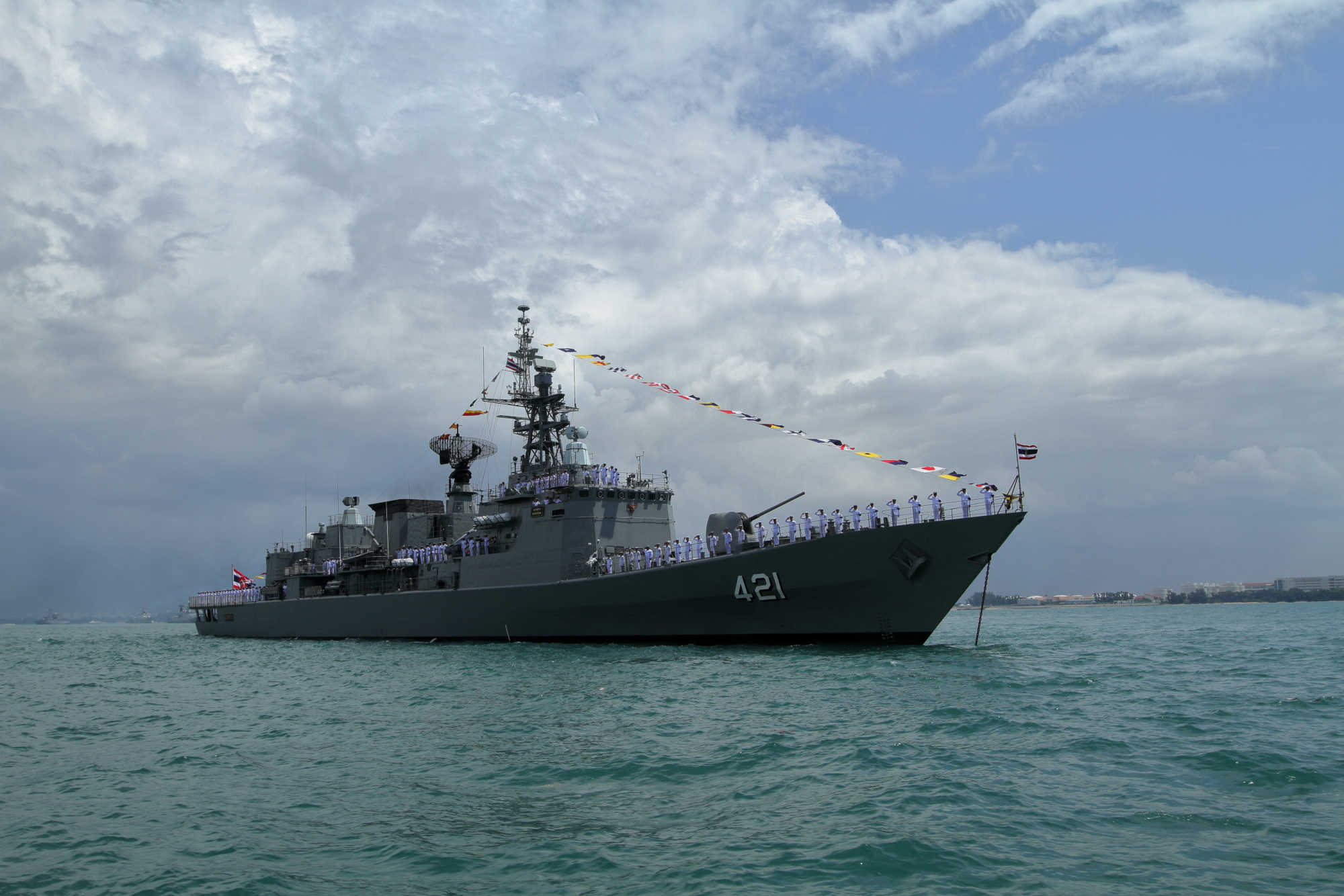
HTMS Naresuan at International Maritime Review, Singapore in 2017

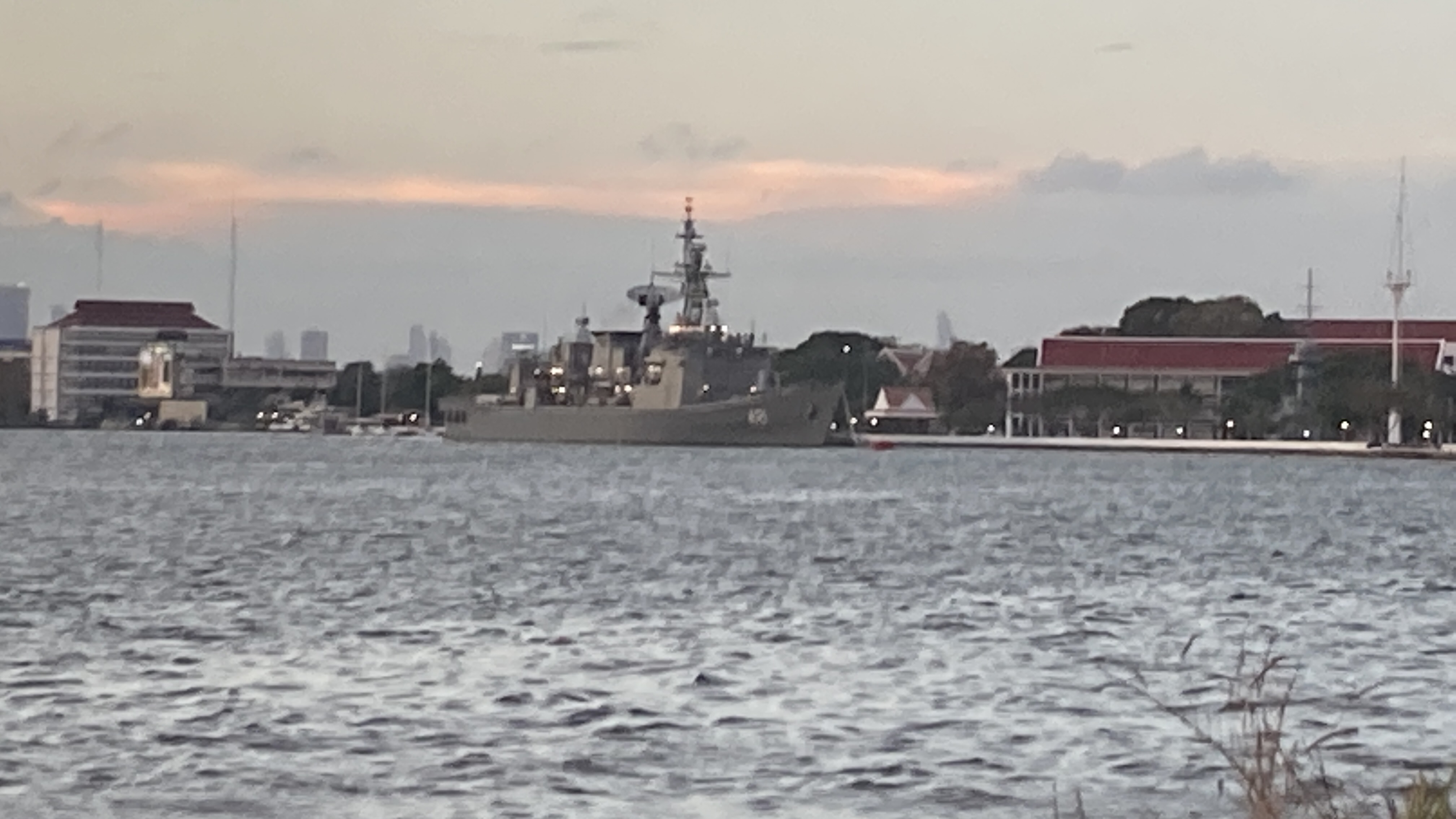
HTMS Naresuan moored at Royal Thai Naval Academy in 2022
