= Naresuan-class frigate =

Thai navy ship

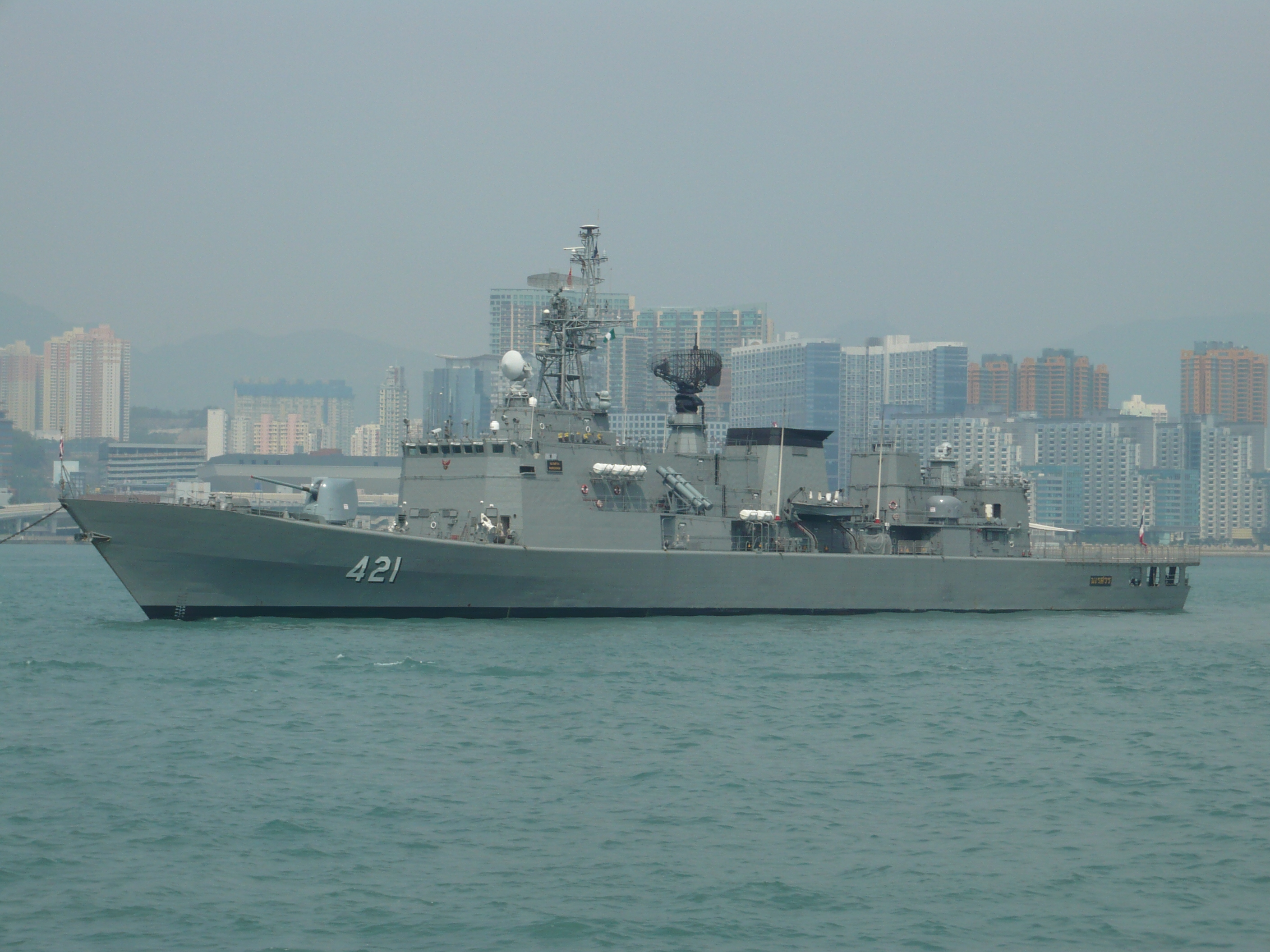
- HTMS Naresuan (FFG 421)

Class overview
- Builders: China State Shipbuilding Corporation, Shanghai
- Operators: Royal Thai Navy
- Preceded by: Phutthayotfa Chulalok class
- Succeeded by: Bhumibol Adulyadej class
- Subclasses: Type 053 frigate
- Built: 1991–1995
- In commission: 1994–present
- Completed: 2
- Active: 2

General characteristics
- Type: Frigate
- Displacement: 2,985 tons full load
- Length: 120.5 m
- Beam: 13.7 m
- Draught: 6 m
- Propulsion: 2 × General Electric LM2500 gas turbines and; 2 × MTU 20V1163 TB83 diesel engines, driving two shafts with controllable pitch propellers in CODOG configuration
- Speed: 32 knots (59 km/h) max
- Range: 4000 nmi (7408 km) at 18 kn
- Complement: 150
- Sensors & processing systems: Saab Sea Giraffe AMD 3D surveillance radar; Thales LW08 long range search radar; Raytheon AN/SPS-64 Navigation radar; Selex IFF SIT422CI&M425; Saab 9LV Mk 4 with Saab TIDLS combat management system; 2 × Saab CEROS 200 Fire Control Radar; Atlas DSQS-24d sonar
- Electronic warfare & decoys: ESM ITT ES-3601 (AN/SLQ-4); ECM Type 984-1 noise jammer & Type 981-3 deception jammer; Decoys Terma SKWS (C-Guard)
- Armament: 1 × 5 in/54 (127 mm) Mk 45 Mod 2 naval gun; 2 × 30mm MSI-DSL DS30MR automated small calibre gun; 8 cell Mk.41 VLS for 32 x RIM-162 ESSM; 8 × RGM-84 Harpoon SSM launcher; 2 × Triple Mark 32 Mod 5 torpedo tubes
- Aircraft carried: 1 × Super Lynx 300

The Naresuan-class frigate (Thai: ชุดเรือหลวงนเรศวร) is an enlarged modified version of the Chinese-made Type 053 frigate with Western weaponry, cooperatively designed by the Royal Thai Navy and China but built by the China State Shipbuilding Corporation in Shanghai. The ships came at 2 billion baht each, less than the 8 billion baht claimed price tag for Western-built frigates.

Upon delivery, the Royal Thai Navy complained of the poor quality of the ships. The damage control system was very limited, with very basic fire suppression systems. It was claimed that if the ships’ hulls were breached, they would quickly be lost to flooding. The Thai Navy had to spend considerable time and effort to correct these issues.

== Ships in the class ==
Name	Number	Builder	Launched	Commissioned	Decommissioned	Status
HTMS Naresuan	421	China State Shipbuilding Corporation	July 1993	15 December 1994		Active
HTMS Taksin	422	China State Shipbuilding Corporation	1994	28 September 1995		Active

== Upgrade ==
On 3 June 2011, Saab announced that it was awarded a contract for the upgrading of the two Naresuan-class frigates. The scope of the upgrade will include Saab's 9LV MK4 combat management system, Sea Giraffe AMB, CEROS 200 fire control radar, EOS 500 electro-optics system and data link systems for communications with the newly acquired Royal Thai Air Force Erieye surveillance aircraft.

The ships also received 8 Mk 41 VLS cells in 2013, giving them the ability to launch RIM-162 ESSM surface-to-air missiles, greatly improving their anti-air capabilities.
