= September 11 attacks (disambiguation) =

The September 11 attacks were a series of four coordinated Islamist terrorist attacks in the United States on September 11, 2001.

September 11 attacks may also refer to:

- The massacre of Drogheda during the British Cromwellian conquest of Ireland, from 3 to 11 September 1649
- Mountain Meadows Massacre in Utah, from September 7 to 11, 1857
- 1973 Chilean coup d'état, on September 11, 1973
- 2012 Benghazi attack, an assault on American facilities in Libya on September 11, 2012

== See also ==
- September 11
- 911 (disambiguation)
