= 911 Battalion (SWATF) =

41/911 Battalion
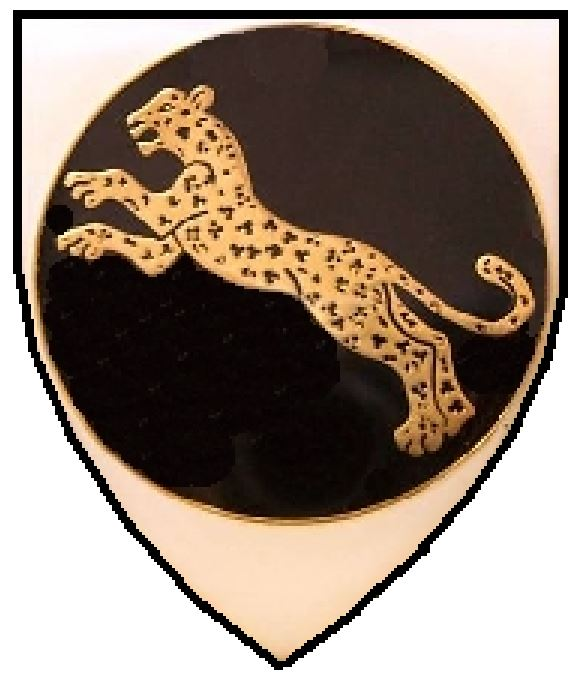
- SWATF 911 Battalion emblem
- Active: 1977
- Country: Namibia, South Africa
- Allegiance: South Africa
- Branch: South African Army,
- Type: Infantry
- Part of: South West African Territorial Force
- Garrison/HQ: Windhoek, Luiperdsvlei
- Equipment: Casspir, Buffel

Commanders
- Ceremonial chief: Commandant Gert Uys

Insignia
- Part of the South West African Territorial Force

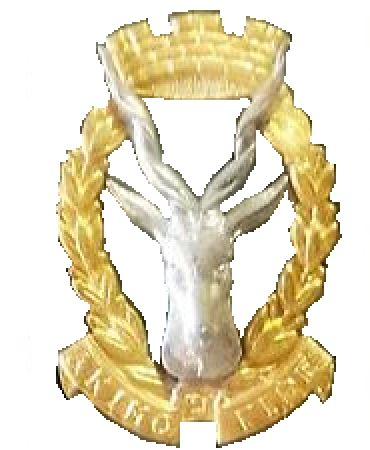
- SWATF Regiment Windhoek beret badge

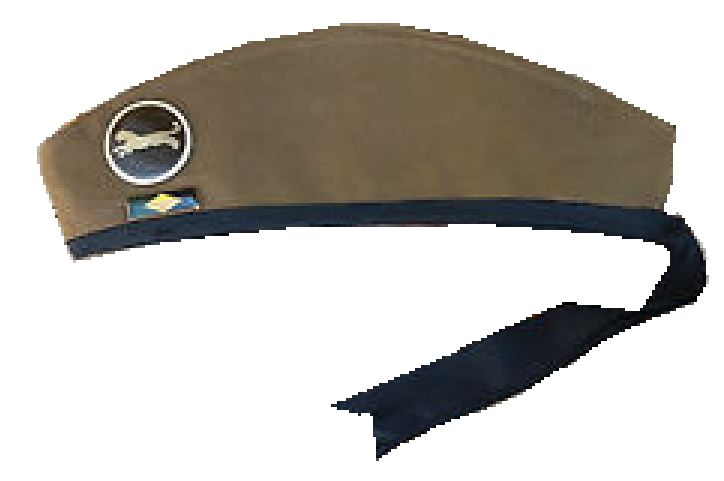
- Regiment Windhoek bonnie cap

911 Battalion was part of the South West African Territorial Force's 91 Brigade.

== History ==
This unit was formed in 1977 and situated sixty kilometers south of Windhoek at Oamites, an old disused copper mine. 911 Battalion was made up of various ethnic groups from SWA, such as Hereros, Damaras, Tswanas, Basters, and Coloureds. 911 Battalion became known as "Swing Force" due to its ability to operate as a conventional unit or as a counter-insurgency (COIN) unit. It recruited from South West Africa at large and deployed predominantly as a reserve force. An infantry element, a mechanized contingent, artillery, and a regiment of Eland armored cars were included. The unit was never mobilized en masse.

911 Battalion was part of 91 Brigade.

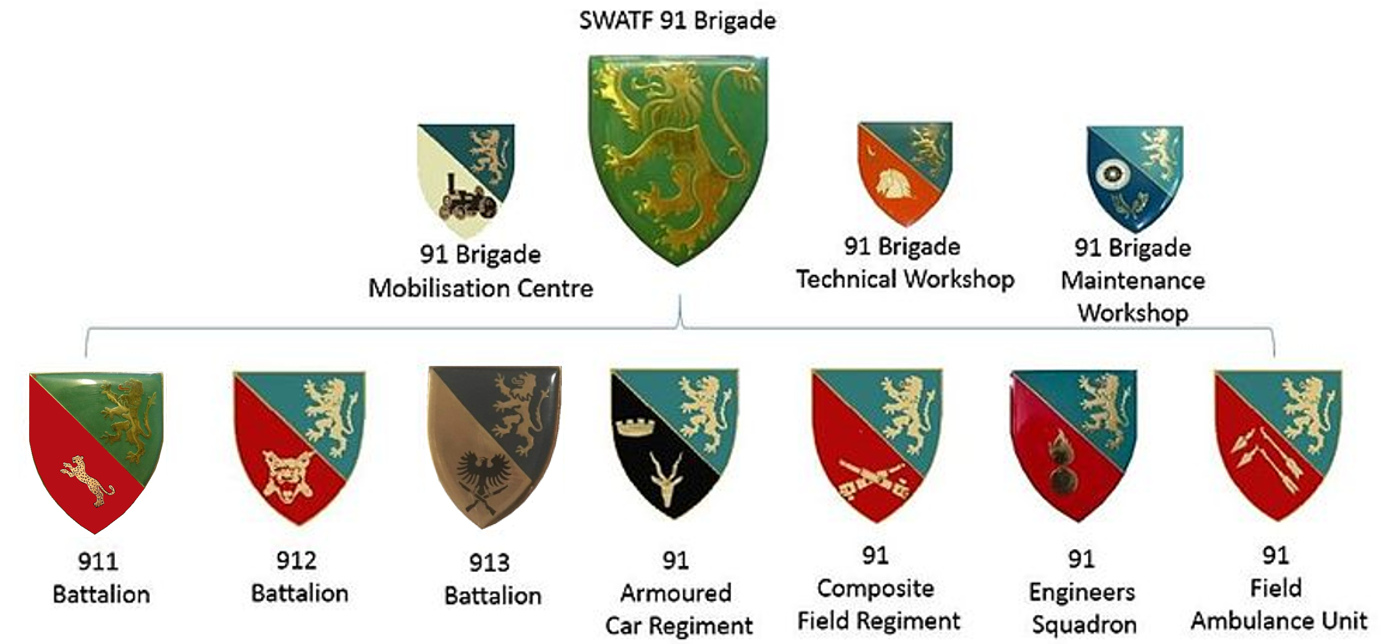

== Operational area ==
The battalion's main operational area was Owamboland, via Oshivello, about two hundred kilometres south of the SWA/Angola border. On entering the Oshivello gate, soldiers had passed over the so-called 'red line' which meant in effect that they were officially on the border and in the operational area.

== See also ==
- Namibian War of Independence
- South African Border War
