= 9LV =

Naval combat management system

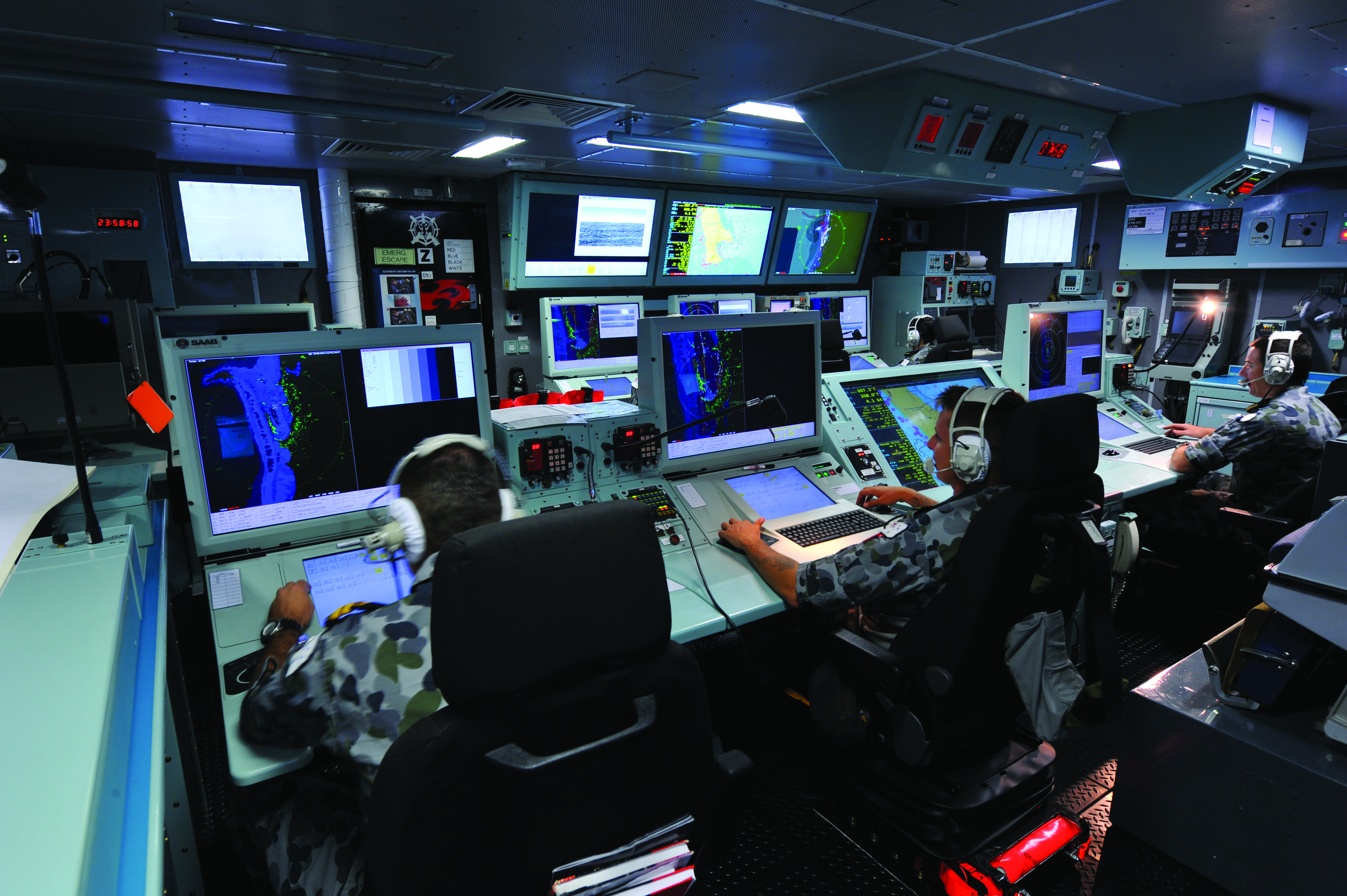
9LV combat management system

9LV is a naval combat management system (CMS) from the Swedish company Saab AB. The system was developed in the late 1960s. It originated from torpedo fire-control systems that were produced by Philips Teleindustri AB in the 1960s.

== Origin ==
=== Background ===
Philips Teleindustri AB was selected to supply some equipment for the Norrköping-class missile boats of the Swedish Navy (Philips Teleindustri AB a subsidiary of Philips of the Netherlands, renamed Philips Elektronikindustrier AB in 1975). The equipment included the torpedo fire control system, the and dual-purpose gun fire control system including a radar fire control director.

Prior to the Norrköping class, Philips provided torpedo fire control to Spica-class and Plejad-class torpedo boats, as well as to Sjöormen-class and Draken-class submarines, and also anti-submarine fire control for the Halland-class destroyers and Visby-class frigates.

The designation 9LV was only established when the air defence fire control and radar fire control director was introduced to the torpedo fire control systems. LV is the Swedish abbreviation for "luftvärn", i.e. air defence.

9LV is currently used on several classes of naval combatants, including the Australian Anzac-class frigates, the Swedish Visby-class corvettes, the Canadian Halifax-class frigates and the Australian Canberra-class landing helicopter dock ships. It will be used on the Norwegian Coast Guard’s new Jan Mayen-class vessels.

=== Name etymology ===
The heritage of the name 9LV can be traced back to the late 1960s and Philips Teleindustri (Järfälla, Sweden). Philips gave the number nine to the product from Sweden. LV is the Swedish abbreviation for Ground Based Air Defence (GBAD), in Swedish "Luftvärn". Often, a specific ship class 9LV configuration is identified by a three digit number, consisting of one complexity digit and a two digit serial or country code. The first digit is defined by the following table.

System numbers
1	Small system, optronic (EOS) "100" director
2	Small system, radar (Ceros) "200" director
3	Significant system, optronic and radar (100 + 200 = 300) directors
4	Major system (actually "2+2" i.e. double Ceros)(Göteborg, ANZAC, Visby, Naresuan)

== Variants ==
=== 9LV Mk1 (1968–1977) ===
To meet the requirements of the Swedish Navy weapon control system on the Norrköping class, the 9LV200 system was developed from 1968 by Philips TeleindustriAB (PTAB). The contract was awarded PTAB 1969. The solution included was based on analogue computers with a newly developed hydraulically controlled director platform and a frequency agile Ku band fire control radar, Ceros. The solution also included an X band track-while-scan target acquisition radar. In the Swedish Navy, the system was denoted ARTE 722. Mk1 included a fixed program digital computer.

=== 9LV Mk2 (1977–1983) ===
The patrol boat Jägaren was built as a test vessel with the Norwegian gunboats Storm and Snögg as references. Later Bergens Mekaniske Verksteder built another 16 patrol boats based on Jägaren. The patrol boats were equipped with 9LV Mk2 (Arte 726). The system was called 9LV Mk2 during the period Arte726 A-D. After the patrol boats had been decommissioned these radars where updated and fitted to the modernised Koster-class mine countermeasures vessels.

=== 9LV Mk2.5 (1983–1987) ===
The 9LV Mk2.5 introduced a new high level language (RTL/2) and also upgrades to the hardware architecture with new processors and busses. The Swedish Navy Arte726E is an example of 9LV Mk2.5.

=== 9LV Mk3 (1987–2005) ===
Based on the experiences from 9LV Mk2.5, a major redesign of 9LV was performed for 9LV Mk3, starting around 1985. It featured a module based architecture called Base System 2000 (Bassystem 2000), as an addition of the commercial OS-9 real-time operating system. The new programming language Ada was introduced in cooperation with the company Rational. After the acquisition of the Ericsson "H Division" developing a competing combat management system (Maril systems) on 1 January 1990, several key architectural features were transferred into 9LV Mk3.

Features of 9LV Mk3 included a fully distributed system, based on Ethernet LAN, with small, location independent, applications implemented in Ada. It also featured a "system family" concept, with all ship classes based on a common code base (reference book on reuse) and multi-function consoles, allowing any operator to perform any task from any position.

=== 9LV Mk3E (1998–2008) ===
Aiming to benefit from the fast development of commercially available hardware, the software base of Mk3 was transferred to Intel based processors on cPCI, running MS Windows NT instead of the real-time OS-9 used in Mk3.

=== 9LV Mk4 (2008–) ===
In order to facilitate integration and partnerships, the Mk4 was developed towards the Naval Open Architecture. Mk4 employs DDS to create modularity and introduces the Java programming language for certain applications. The first deployment of some limited 9LV Mk4 software components were as part of the Lockheed Martin Canada CMS330 combat system used on the Halifax-class frigate where Saab acted as a sub-supplier to Lockheed Martin Canada. Later versions of CMS330 do not utilize 9LV Mk4 components.

One important milestone for 9LV Mk4 was the firing on 30 August 2015 of the ESSM missile from HTMS Naresuan during the military exercise CARAT 2015, less than three years after the signing of the contract for the missile.

As Saab has evolved the architecture of 9LV with virtualization, containerization and other technologies, the generation indicator (Mk4) is becoming less emphasized and is not even mentioned in marketing, instead the term NextGen is used.

== Company heritage of 9LV development ==
The history of C2S, the creator of 9LV

- 1938: Standard Radiofabrik is established
- 1956: SRT (Standard Radio & Telefon AB) is founded
- 1964: SRT builds a factory in Veddesta, Järfälla outside Stockholm
- 1968: Philips Teleindustrier is established; opening ceremony with the Swedish King
- 1971: Stansaab is created out of the computer part of SRT, (owners are the state, Saab and ITT)
- 1973: ITT leaves their ownership of Stansaab
- 1975: Stansaab get a big order regarding AOC in Moskva
- 1976: Philips Elektronikindustrier (merger with Philips Teleindustrier)
- 1978: Datasaab created from merger of Stansaab & Datasaab
- 1981: Ericsson buys Datasaab and keeps Alfaskop while SRA procures radar systems, later to be Ericsson Radio Systems
- 1982: Ericsson Information Systems (EIS) established
- 1982: SRA Communications AB is established
- 1983: Marconi leaves ownership of SRA to Ericsson Radio Systems
- 1988: Command & control and radar technology becomes Ericsson Radar Electronics (ERE)
- 1990: Bofors Electronics (BEAB) acquires Philips, Ericssons (ERE) military production
- 1991: BEAB joins Nobeltech
- 1993: Nobeltech changes name to Celsiustech
- 2000: Saab buys Celsiustech; new names are SaabTech Systems and SaabTech Electronics
- 2003: SaabTech created from Saab Avionics & SaabTech Systems
- 2005: Saab Systems created
- 2009: Saab Security and defence solutions

Command and control history within Saab 1966 a work group started (name SESAM) to work on the next generation combat management system. This led to the first drafts on what was later to become NIBS (Näckens InformationsBehandlingsSystem). The group came up with an entirely digital combined combat and fire control solution with two operator positions able to evaluate at least 10 targets. The three operator consoles where of Stansaab type. The order was later given to Stansaab; the software was delivered by Teleplan.

- 1988: SESUB (Strids- & Eldledning SUBmarin); contract awarded to Datasaab (modern NIBS)
- 1996: SESUB 940 entire solution awarded to CelsiusTech

== Awards and recognition ==
Saab wins Project of the Year Award in Australia, 2012: Saab, along with BAE Systems and CEA Technologies, has won the Major Company/DMO Project Team of the Year for the Anti-Ship Missile Defence project which implemented the most advanced model of the Saab 9LV combat management system.

== Bibliography ==
- Friedman, Norman (1997), The Naval Institute Guide to World Naval Weapons Systems, 1997–1998, Naval Institute Press, ISBN 978-1-55750268-1.
- Jönson, Malte (2012-02-04). "Den marina strids- och eldledningsmaterielens utveckling under 50 år i koncentrat" [Swedish naval fire control and combat management during 50 years] (PDF) (in Swedish). NU: Försvarets Historiska Telesamlingar Marinen.
