= RIM-162 ESSM =

RIM-162 Evolved SeaSparrow Missile (ESSM)
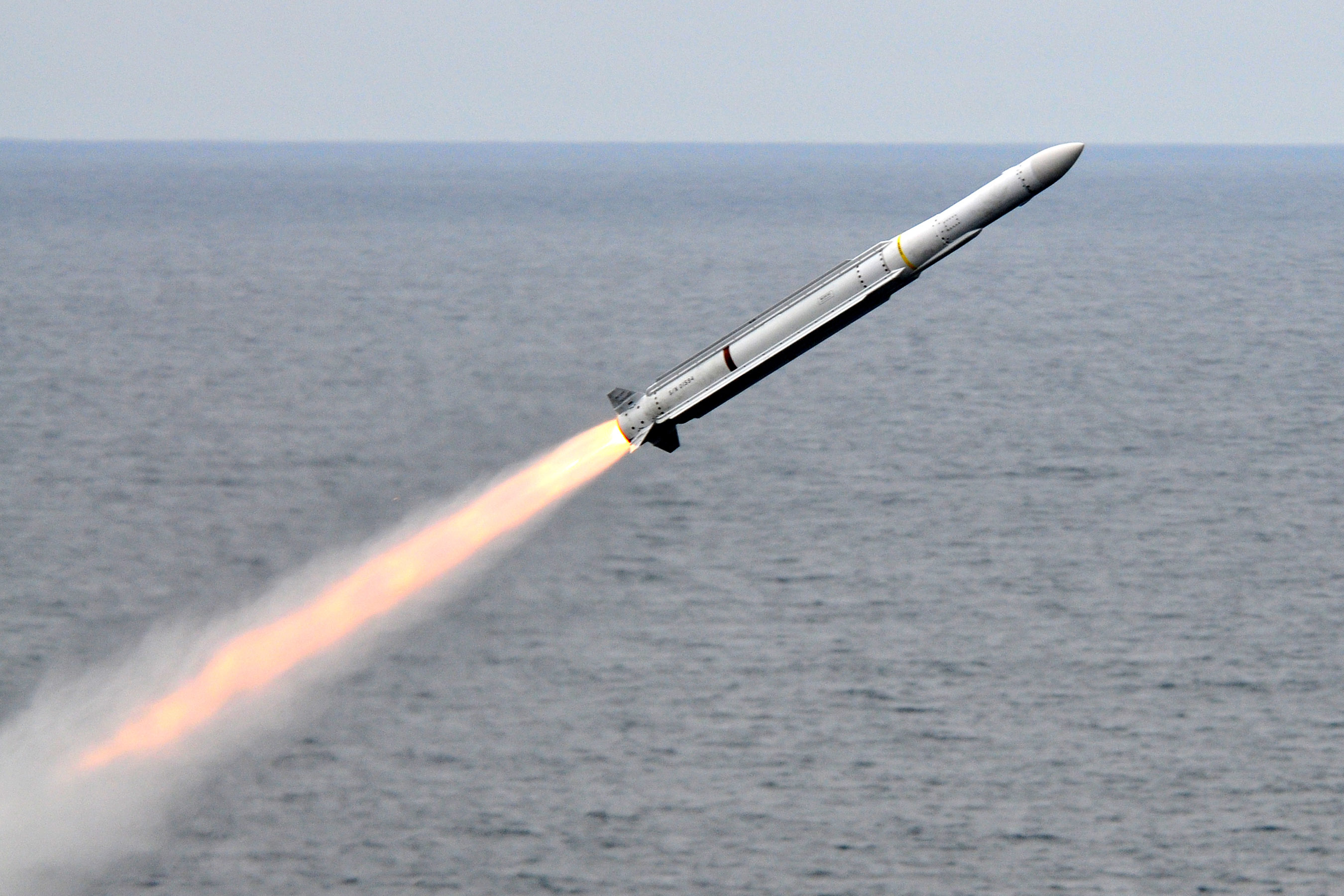
- Type: Medium-range surface-to-air missile Surface-to-surface missile
- Place of origin: United States

Service history
- In service: 2004
- Used by: Australia, Canada, Chile, Denmark, Finland, Germany, Greece, Japan, Mexico, the Netherlands, Norway, Spain, Thailand, Turkey, UAE and the US

Production history
- Manufacturer: Raytheon
- Unit cost: US$956,000 (FY2016); US$1,795,000 (FY2021) (average)
- Produced: September 1998
- No. built: 2000th missile delivered 2 August 2012

Specifications
- Mass: 620 lb (280 kg)
- Length: 12 ft (3.66 m)
- Diameter: 10 in (254 mm)
- Warhead: 86 lb (39 kg) blast-fragmentation
- Detonation mechanism: Proximity fuze
- Engine: Mk 134 Mod 0 solid fuel rocket
- Operational range: 27 nmi+ (50 km+)
- Maximum speed: Mach 4+
- Guidance system: Mid-course update datalink; Terminal semi-active radar homing for Block 1, dual semi-active/active radar homing for Block 2
- Launch platform: Mk 41 VLS (RIM-162A/B); Mk 48 VLS (RIM-162C); Mk 56 VLS; Mk 57 VLS (RIM-162F); Mk 29 box launcher (RIM-162D/G)

The RIM-162 Evolved SeaSparrow Missile (ESSM) is a development of the RIM-7 Sea Sparrow missile used to protect ships from attacking missiles and aircraft. ESSM is designed to counter supersonic maneuvering anti-ship missiles. ESSM also has the ability to be "quad-packed" in the Mark 41 Vertical Launch System, allowing up to four ESSMs to be carried in a single cell.

== Design ==
The original Sea Sparrow was an expedient design intended to provide short-range defensive fire in a system that could be deployed as rapidly as possible. The AIM-7 Sparrow was the simplest solution, as its radar guidance allowed it to be fired head-on at targets. The radar signal could be provided by mounting an aircraft radar on a trainable platform on a ship. In the years after its introduction, it was upgraded to follow improvements being made in the air-to-air Sparrow models used by the US Navy and US Air Force. The ultimate version in this line was the R model, which introduced a new dual-seeker homing system and many other upgrades. In the air-to-air role, however, this was passed over in favor of the AIM-120 AMRAAM, which offered much higher performance from a smaller and lighter missile. Development of the air-to-air Sparrow ended in the 1990s.

Only the Sea Sparrow, therefore, remained using the basic platform—with no need to be suitable for aircraft. Rather than using the existing P and R models, it was decided to dramatically upgrade the weapon. The Evolved Sea Sparrow (ESSM) emerged as a completely new weapon, sharing only the name with the original. All of the same support equipment was used, though, allowing it to be fitted to ships already mounting the older models. Compared to the Sea Sparrow, the ESSM has a larger, more powerful rocket motor—developed by Orbital ATK in cooperation with Nammo Raufoss—for increased range and agility, as well as upgraded aerodynamics using strakes and skid-to-turn. In addition, the ESSM takes advantage of the latest missile guidance technology, with different versions for Aegis/AN/SPY-1, Sewaco/Active Phased Array Radar (APAR), and traditional target illumination all-the-way.

In the 2000s, the NATO Seasparrow Project Office began planning an upgraded Block 2 version of the ESSM. In 2014, Canada pledged CA$200,000,000 to underwrite their share of the Block 2's development cost. ESSM Block 2 leverages the existing Block 1 rocket motor and features a dual-mode X band seeker, increased maneuverability, and other enhancements. Block 2 features enhanced communications systems that allow mid-course guidance correction, making the missiles easy to network into the Navy's emerging Cooperative Engagement Capability. Unlike Block 1, Block 2's active radar homing seeker supports terminal engagement without the launch ship's target illumination radars. The upgraded blast-fragmentation warhead was designed, developed and is being produced by Roketsan. The improved ESSM Block II will be fielded by the US Navy from 2020.

== Launchers ==
=== Mk 29 ===
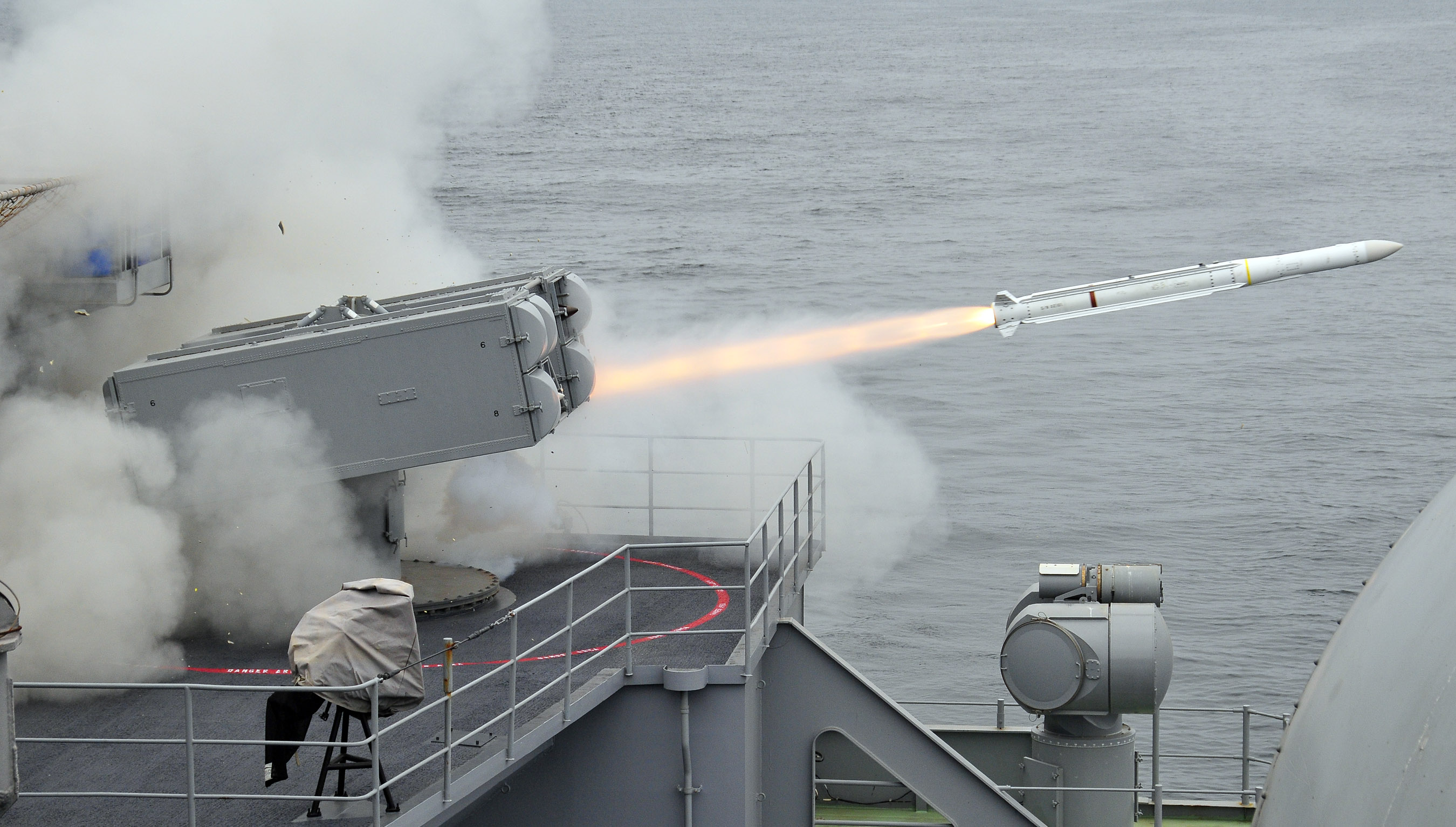
An ESSM is launched from a Mk 29 launcher aboard USS Carl Vinson

The original launcher is the Mark 29 Guided Missile Launching System Mod. 4 & 5 (Mk 29 GMLS Mod 4 & 5), which is developed from earlier models Mk 29 Mod 1/2/3 for Sea Sparrow. Mk 29 launchers provide on-mount stowage and launching capability for firing up to eight missiles in a self-contained environmentally controlled trainable launcher design.

=== Mk 41 ===
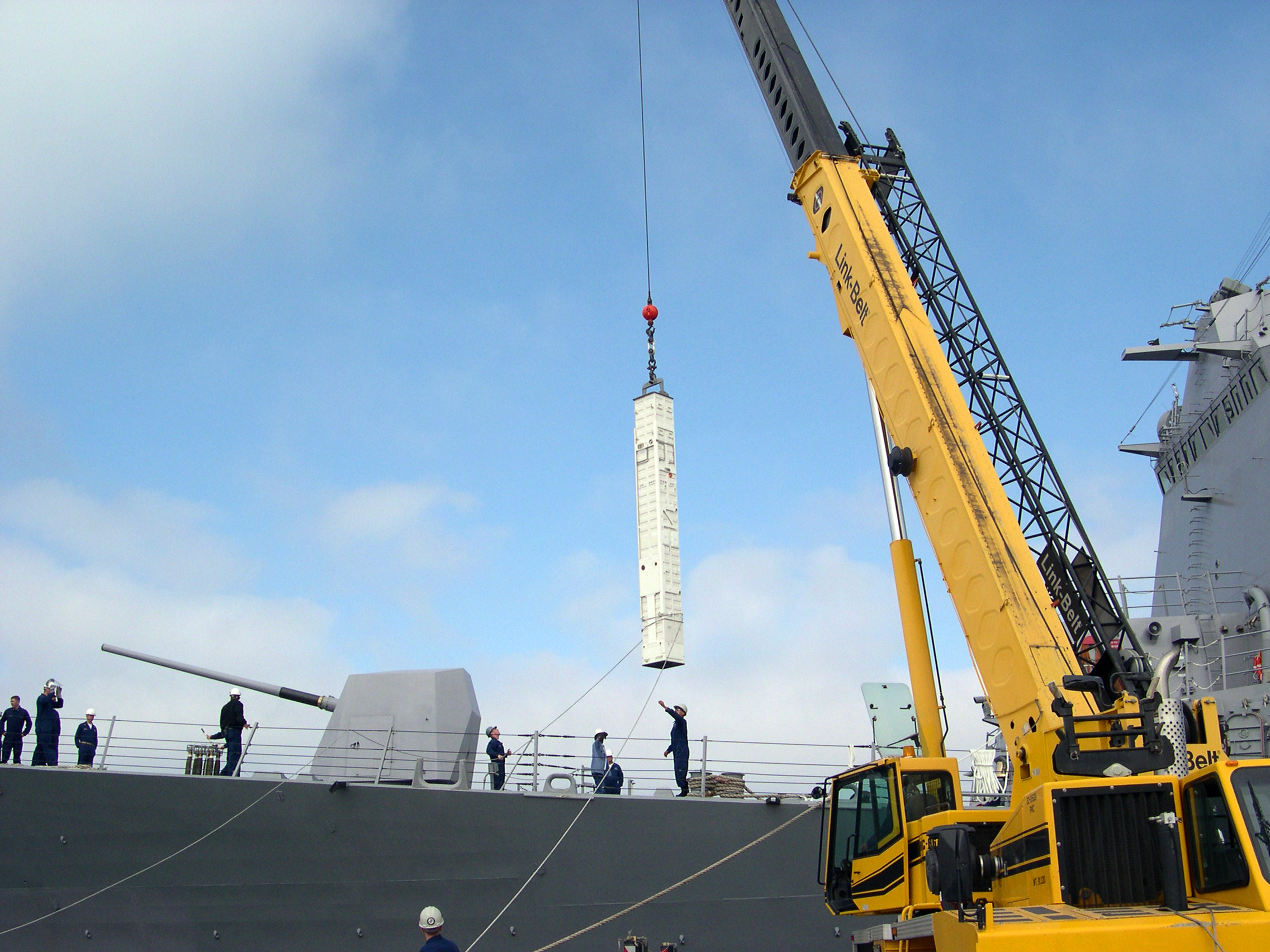
A crane lifts an ESSM quadpack into a Mk 41 launcher aboard the guided-missile destroyer USS McCampbell

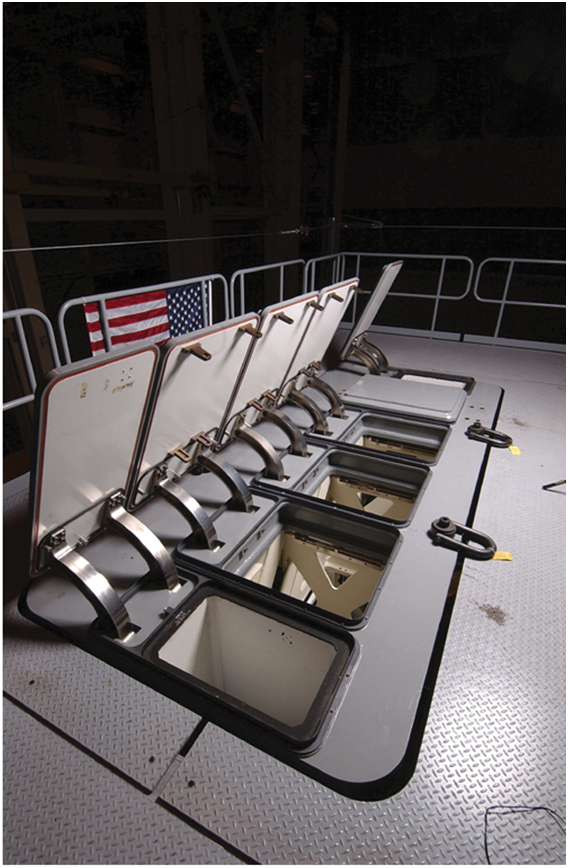
Mk 57 VLS

The Mark 41 Vertical Launching System is the primary launch system for the Evolved SeaSparrow Missile. The Mk 41 is deployed aboard destroyers and frigates, primarily of the United States and allied nations. The ESSM is quadpacked within a Mk 41 cell allowing a significantly increased missile load over SM-2.

=== Mk 48 ===
In addition to the Mk 29 GMLS and Mk 41 VLS, the other primary launcher is Mk 48 VLS. The 2-cell module of Mk 48 makes the system very versatile and enables it to be installed on board in spaces that otherwise cannot be used. The weight of a 2-cell module of Mk 48 is 660 kg (1,450 lb; including empty canisters), 330 kg (725 lb) for exhaust system, and 360 kg (800 lb) for ship installation interfaces. Each canister of the Mk 48 VLS houses a single RIM-7VL (Vertically Launched) Sea Sparrow cell or two RIM-162 ESSM cells, though, with modification, other missiles can also be launched. There are a total of four models in the Mk 48 family, with Mod 0 & 1 housing either 2 RIM-7VL or 4 RIM-162 cells, Mod 2 housing either 16 RIM-7VL or 32 RIM-162 cells. Mod 0/1/2 are usually grouped into either a 16-cell module for RIM-7VL or a 32-cell module for RIM-162. Mod 3 fits into the StanFlex modules on Royal Danish Navy ships and can house either 6 RIM-7VL or 12 RIM-162 cells; the Danes now use the latter.

Vertical Missile Launcher Mk 48 GMVLS
Above deck
Mod #	Width (cm)	Depth (cm)	Height (cm)	Weight (kg)			
Mod #	Width (cm)	Depth (cm)	Height (cm)	incl. 16 RIM-7VLs		incl. 32 RIM-162s	
Mod #	Width (cm)	Depth (cm)	Height (cm)	Above-deck	Below-deck	Above-deck	Below-deck
Mod 0	228	127	478	15,128	814	29,568	408
Mod 1	173	132	465	12,464	814	26,020	408
Mod 2	477	417	474	16,834	814	30,482	408
Mod 3	366	271	473	7,272	476	11,340	476
Below deck
Missile Launching System (1 per 16 cells, not required for Mod 3)	61	99	132	-	-	-	-
Electrical Interface Unit (1 per 4 cells, not required for Mod 3)	64	45	91	-	-	-	-
Launching Controller (1 per 8 cells, not required for Mod 3)	152	34	200	-	-	-	-
ESSM Launching Controller (1 per 16 cells, ESSM cells)	89	30	178	-	-	-	-

=== Mk 56 ===
The successor of the Mk 48 VLS is the Mark 56 Guided Missile Vertical Launching System (Mk 56 GMVLS) or simply Mk 56. In comparison to its predecessor, the Mk 56 uses a greater percentage of composite material, reducing the weight by more than 20%. The Mexican Navy will be one of the customers of the Mk 56, using an 8-cell launcher on their Sigma-class design frigates.

Specifications:

Vertical Missile Launcher Mk 56 GMVLS
# of missiles	4	12	32	Launch controller (1 per 16 missiles)
Width (cm)	173	366	477	94
Depth (cm)	132	271	417	34
Height (cm)	465	465	465	190
Weight (kg) w/ missiles	3,464	10,200	23,859	-
Weight (kg) w/ below deck launch controller	3,714	10,450	24,359	250

=== Mark 57 (Mk 57) ===
The Mk 57 Peripheral Vertical Launching System (PVLS), an evolution of Mk 41 VLS, is used on Zumwalt-class destroyers. It is designed to be installed on the ship periphery instead of centralized magazines. It comes in 4-cell launcher modules and provides backward compatibility with existing missiles, while allowing new missiles with significantly increased propulsion and payloads.

== AMRAAM-ER ==
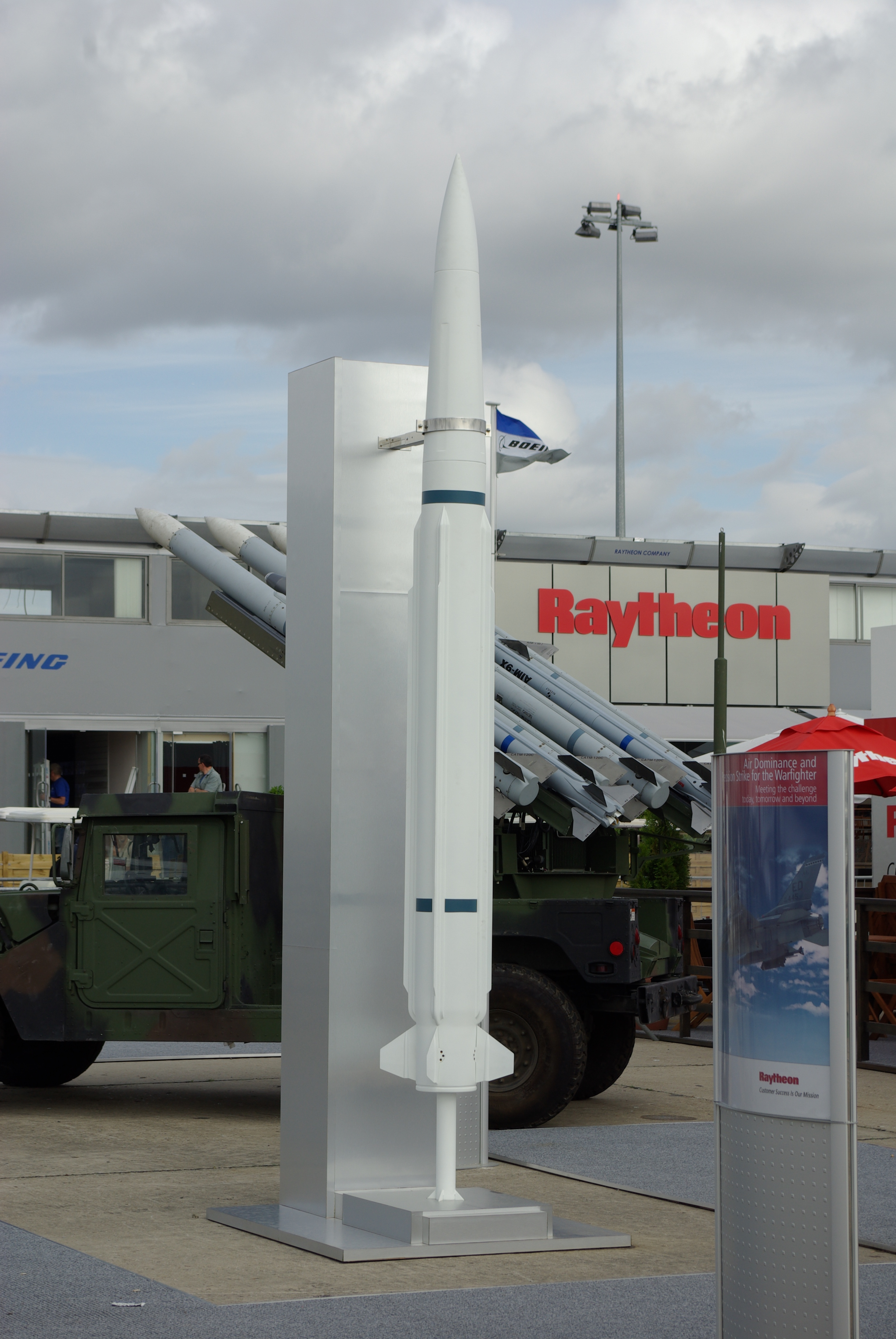
AMRAAM-ER

The AMRAAM-ER is an Extended Range upgrade to the AIM-120 AMRAAM missile for the NASAMS ground-based air defense system, which combines ESSM rocket motor with the AMRAAM two-stage seeker head.

== Operational history ==
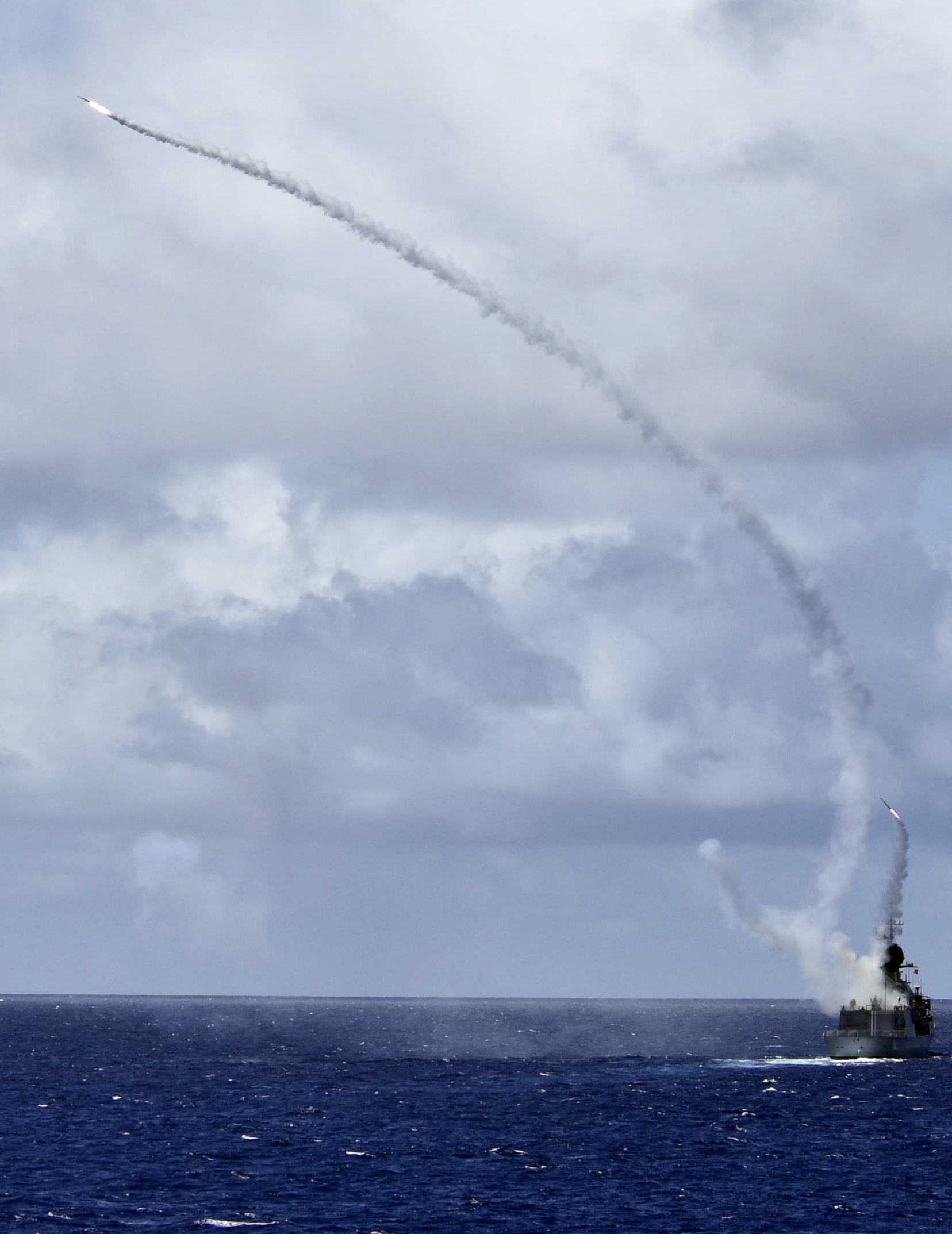
The Australian frigate HMAS Ballarat firing two ESSMs in 2016

US operational evaluation was conducted in July 2002 aboard USS Shoup. Initial operational capability did not occur until later.

In October 2003, at the USN Pacific Missile Range Facility near Hawaii, Australian frigate HMAS Warramunga conducted a successful firing of an ESSM. The firing was also the first operational use of the CEA Technologies CWI for guidance.

In November 2003, approximately 200 nautical miles (370 km) from the Azores, the Royal Netherlands Navy (RNLN) frigate HNLMS De Zeven Provinciën conducted a live fire test of a single ESSM. This firing was the first ever live firing involving a full-size ship-borne active electronically scanned array (i.e. the APAR radar) guiding a missile using the Interrupted Continuous Wave Illumination (ICWI) technique in an operational environment. As related by Jane's Navy International:

During the tracking and missile-firing tests, target profiles were provided by Greek-built EADS/3Sigma Iris PVK medium-range subsonic target drones. [...] According to the RNLN, ... "APAR immediately acquired the missile and maintained track until destruction". [...] These ground-breaking tests represented the world's first live verification of the ICWI technique.

In August 2004, a German Navy Sachsen-class frigate completed a series of live missile firings at the Point Mugu missile launch range off the coast of California that included a total of 11 ESSM missile firings. The tests included firings against target drones such as the Northrop BQM-74E Chukar III and Teledyne Ryan BQM-34S Firebee I, as well as against missile targets such as the Beech AQM-37C and air-launched Kormoran 1 anti-ship missiles.

Further live firings were performed by the RNLN frigate HNLMS De Zeven Provinciën in March 2005, again in the Atlantic Ocean approximately 180 nautical miles (330 km) west of the Azores. The tests involved three live-firing events (two of which involved the ESSM) including firing a single SM-2 Block IIIA at an Iris target drone at long range, a single ESSM at an Iris target drone, and a two-salvo launch (with one salvo comprising two SM-2 Block IIIAs and the other comprising two ESSMs) against two incoming Iris target drones.

All ESSM launches from De Zeven Provinciën and Sachsen-class frigates involved ESSMs quad-packed in a Mark 41 Vertical Launching System.

The first "kill" by the RIM-162D from a United States Navy carrier's Mk 29 launcher was achieved during a training exercise by USS John C. Stennis on 7 October 2008.

On 14 May 2013, the ESSM intercepted a high-diving supersonic test target, demonstrating the ability to hit high-G manoeuvering, low-velocity air threats, as well as surface targets. No software changes were needed to prove the ESSM's enhanced capability.

On 30 August 2015, during the annual 'Co-operation Afloat Readiness and Training' ('CARAT') exercise, the ESSM was fired from the Royal Thai Navy Naresuan-class guided-missile frigate HTMS Naresuan and achieved a direct hit on a BQM-74E drone missile launched from the USN amphibious dock landing ship USS Germantown.

On 9 October 2016, USS Mason fired one RIM-162 ESSM and two SM-2s to defend against two incoming Houthi anti-ship cruise missiles, potentially Chinese-built C-802 missiles. It is unknown if the RIM-162 was responsible for intercepting either of the missiles, but the incident marked the first time the ESSM was used in a combat situation.

In 2018, the ESSM Block 2 passed its first live fire test, successfully intercepting a BQM-74E target drone using its active guidance seeker-head.

== Operators ==
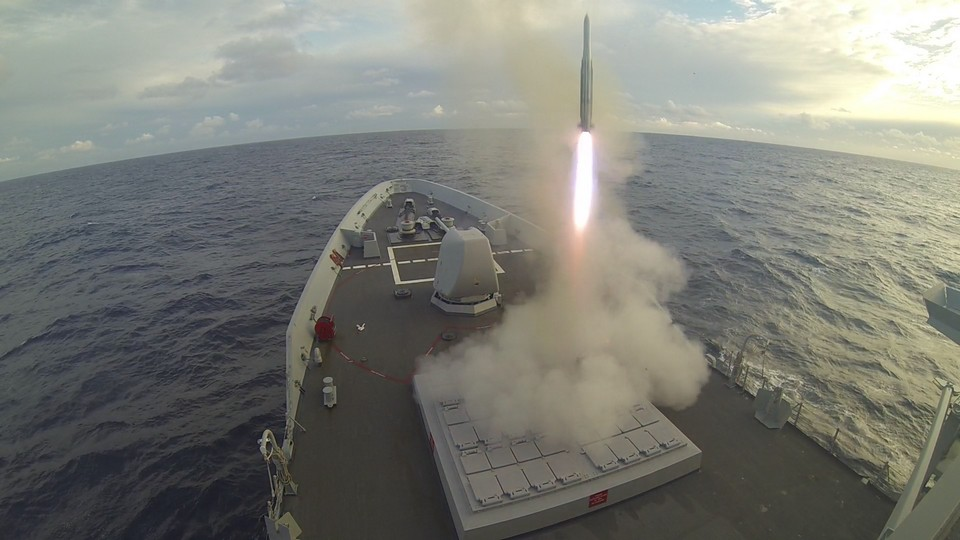
The Spanish frigate Álvaro de Bazán launches an ESSM to intercept a simulated enemy missile during exercise Formidable Shield 2017

Source: US Navy—Fact File: Evolved Seasparrow Missile

ESSM Consortium Members:

- Australia
- Canada
- Denmark
- Germany
- Greece
- Netherlands
- Norway
- Spain
- Turkey
- United States

Foreign Military Sales (FMS):

- Belgium
- Chile
- Finland
- Japan
- Mexico
- Portugal
- Thailand
- United Arab Emirates

== See also ==
=== Related development ===
- AIM-7 Sparrow
- RIM-7 Sea Sparrow

=== Similar missile systems ===
- MICA (missile) – (France)
- CAMM (missile family) – (United Kingdom, Italy)
- K-SAAM – (South Korea)
- HQ-16 – (China)
- Buk missile system – (Soviet Union)
- VL-SRSAM – (India)
- Sky Sword II#TC-2N – (Taiwan)
- List of missiles
