= German frigate Rheinland-Pfalz =

At least two warships of Germany have been named Rheinland-Pfalz:

- German frigate Rheinland-Pfalz (F209), a Bremen-class frigate launched in 1980 and sold for scrapping in 2017
- German frigate Rheinland-Pfalz (F225), a Baden-Württemberg-class frigate launched in 2017
