= German frigate Baden-Württemberg =

Baden-Württemberg-class frigate

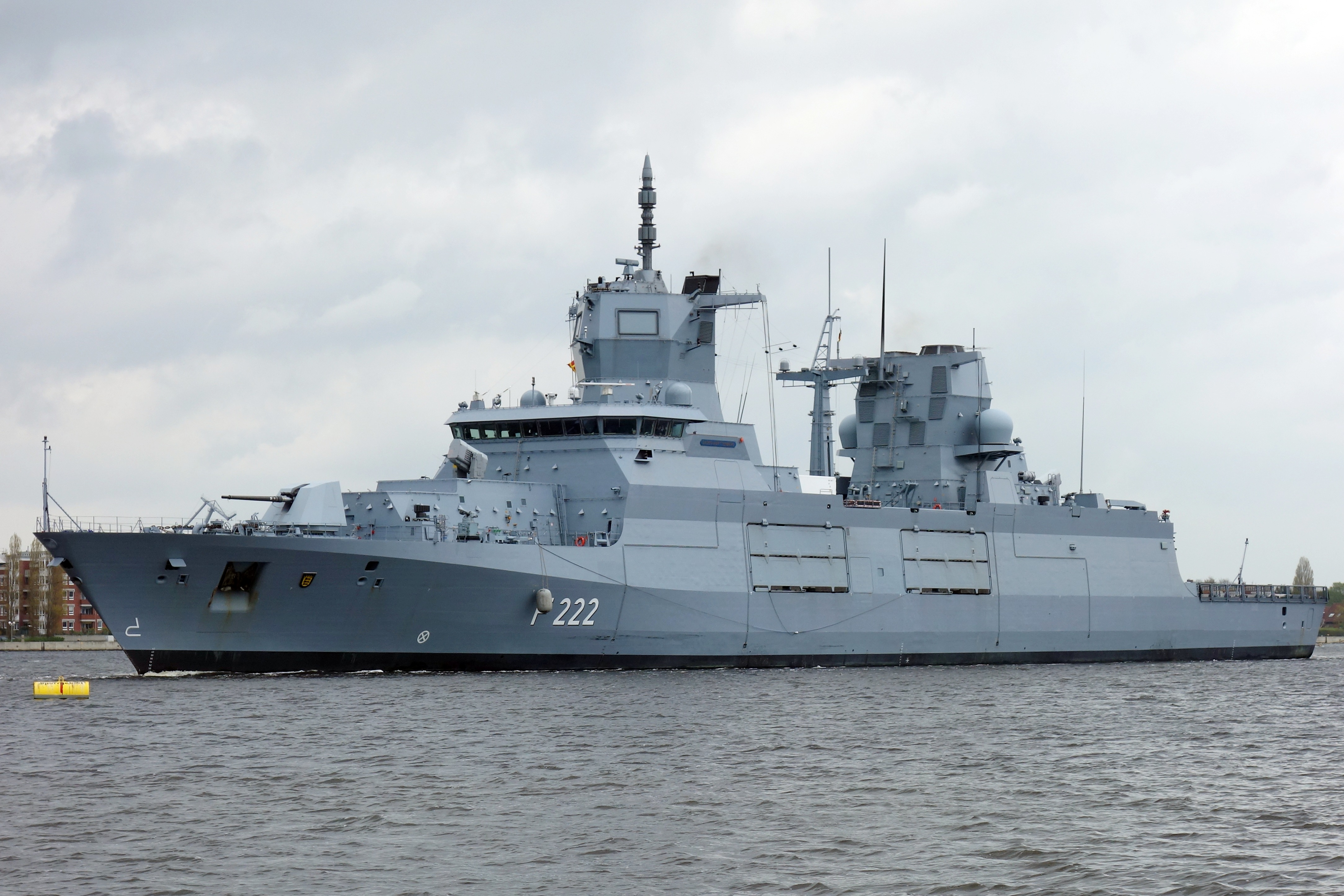
- Baden-Württemberg at the deperming range in Wilhelmshaven

History

Germany
- Name: Baden-Württemberg
- Namesake: Baden-Württemberg
- Port of registry: Hamburg, Germany
- Builder: Lürssen, Wolgast Blohm+Voss, Hamburg
- Laid down: 2 November 2011
- Launched: 12 December 2013
- Commissioned: 17 June 2019
- Identification: MMSI number: 211920000; Callsign: DRAD; Pennant number: F222
- Status: Active

General characteristics
- Class & type: Baden-Württemberg-class frigate
- Displacement: 7,200 tonnes
- Length: 149.52 m (490 ft 7 in)
- Beam: 18.80 m (61 ft 8 in)
- Draught: 5 m (16 ft 5 in)
- Propulsion: CODLAG; 1 × 20 MW gas turbine; 2 × 4.7 MW electric motors; 4 × 2.9 MW diesel generators; 3 × gearboxes: one for each shaft and one to crossconnect the gas turbine to them; 2 × shafts, driving controllable pitch propellers; 1 × 1 MW bow thruster
- Speed: 20 knots (37 km/h) on diesel only, 26 kn (48 km/h) max.
- Range: 4,000 nautical miles (7,400 km)
- Boats & landing craft carried: Submarine ROVs; 4 × 11 m (36 ft 1 in) RHIB, capable of more than 40 kn (74 km/h)
- Capacity: Space for two 6.1 m (20 ft 0 in) containers
- Complement: 190 (standard crew: 110)
- Sensors & processing systems: 1 × Cassidian TRS-4D AESA radar; 2(?) × navigation radars; IFF; diver and swimmer detection sonar (no anti-submarine sonar); Laser warning; KORA-18 Combined RADAR and COMMS ESM from GEDIS; Link 11, Link 16, Link 22 communications systems
- Electronic warfare & decoys: TKWA/MASS (Multi Ammunition Softkill System); ECM
- Armament: Naval guns: 1 × 127 mm lightweight Otobreda naval gun with guided VULCANO ammunition for land-attack missions (range: more than 100 km (62 mi)); 2 × 27 mm MLG 27 remote-controlled autocannons; 5 × 12.7 mm Hitrole-NT remote-controlled machine gun turrets; 2 × 12.7 mm heavy machine guns (manually controlled); Anti-air missiles: 2 × RAM Block II surface-to-air missile launcher/CIWS, 21 cells each; Anti-ship missiles: 8 × RGM-84 Harpoon anti-ship missiles (interim solution until joint sea/land attack missile RBS 15 MK4 becomes available); Non-Lethal: Water cannons
- Aircraft carried: 2 × NH-90 helicopters

Baden-Württemberg (F222) is the lead ship of the Baden-Württemberg-class frigates of the German Navy.

== Background ==
Baden-Württemberg was designed and constructed by ARGE F125, a joint-venture of Thyssen-Krupp and Lürssen. She is part of the Baden-Württemberg class, which has the highest displacement of any class of frigate worldwide and is used to replace the Bremen class.

== Construction and career ==
Baden-Württemberg was laid down on 2 November 2011 and launched on 12 December 2013 in Hamburg, Germany. She was commissioned on 17 June 2019. It was completed three years late after multiple issues including being overweight and developing 1.3 degree list during sea trials.

On 17 April 2020, Baden-Württemberg completed her extreme weather test in the South Atlantic after she left Brazil on 7 February to test hot weather near the Equator.

In January 2022, it was reported that full operational capability for Baden-Württemberg was still only expected in mid-2023. In 2024, Baden-Württemberg was selected to undertake an around the world deployment, accompanied by the support ship Frankfurt am Main. In September, the frigate sailed through the Taiwan Strait.

The frigate along with Frankfurt am Main participated in the Maritime Partnership Exercise (MPX) with the Indian Navy's INS Delhi from 21 to 23 October 2024 in the Bay of Bengal and the Indian Ocean. On its return journey, the frigate avoided passage through the Red Sea due to its inability to counter potential threats posed by Houthi rebels.

== Gallery ==
Baden-Württemberg gallery

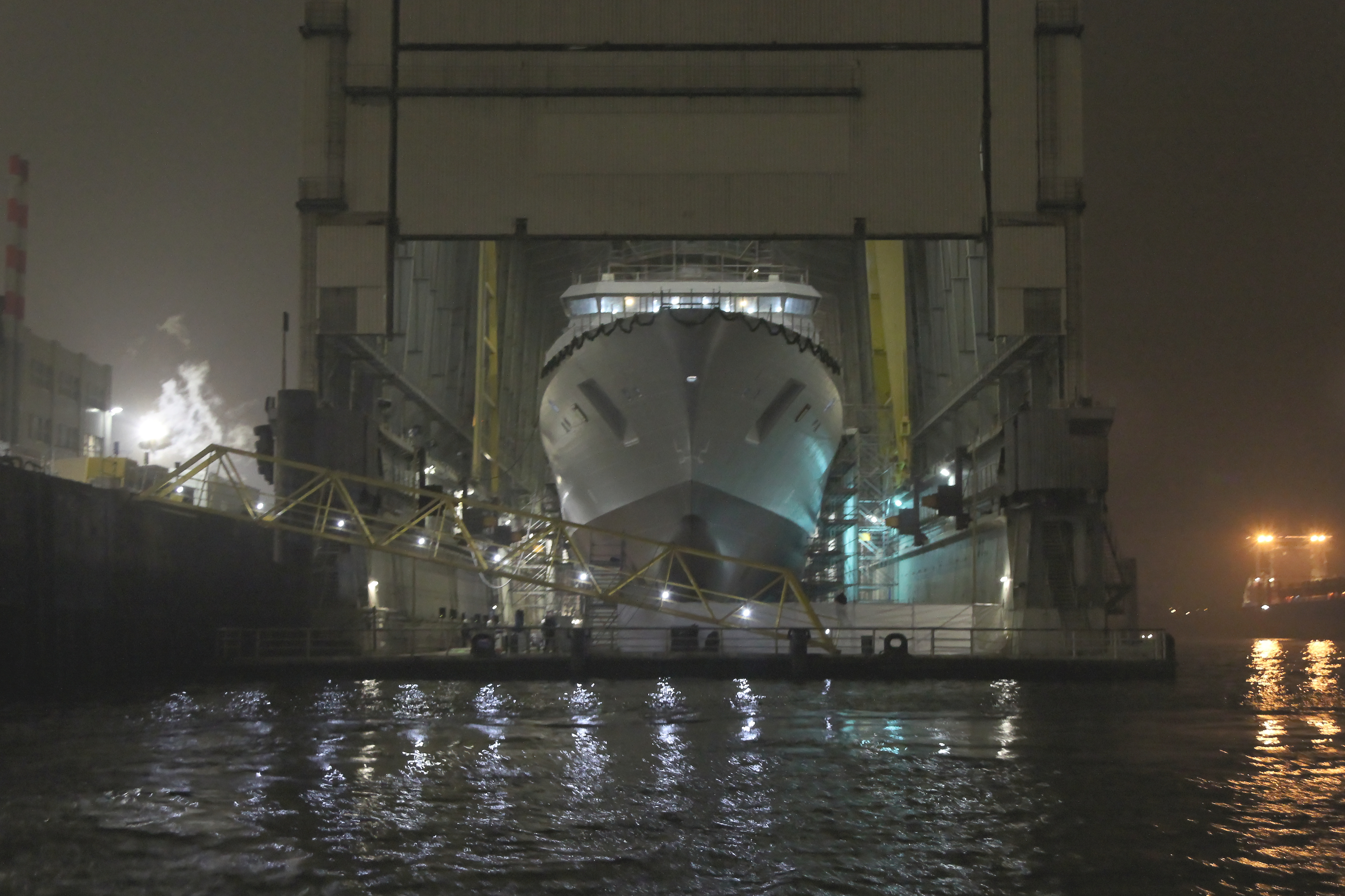
Baden-Württemberg under construction in Hamburg on 11 December 2013

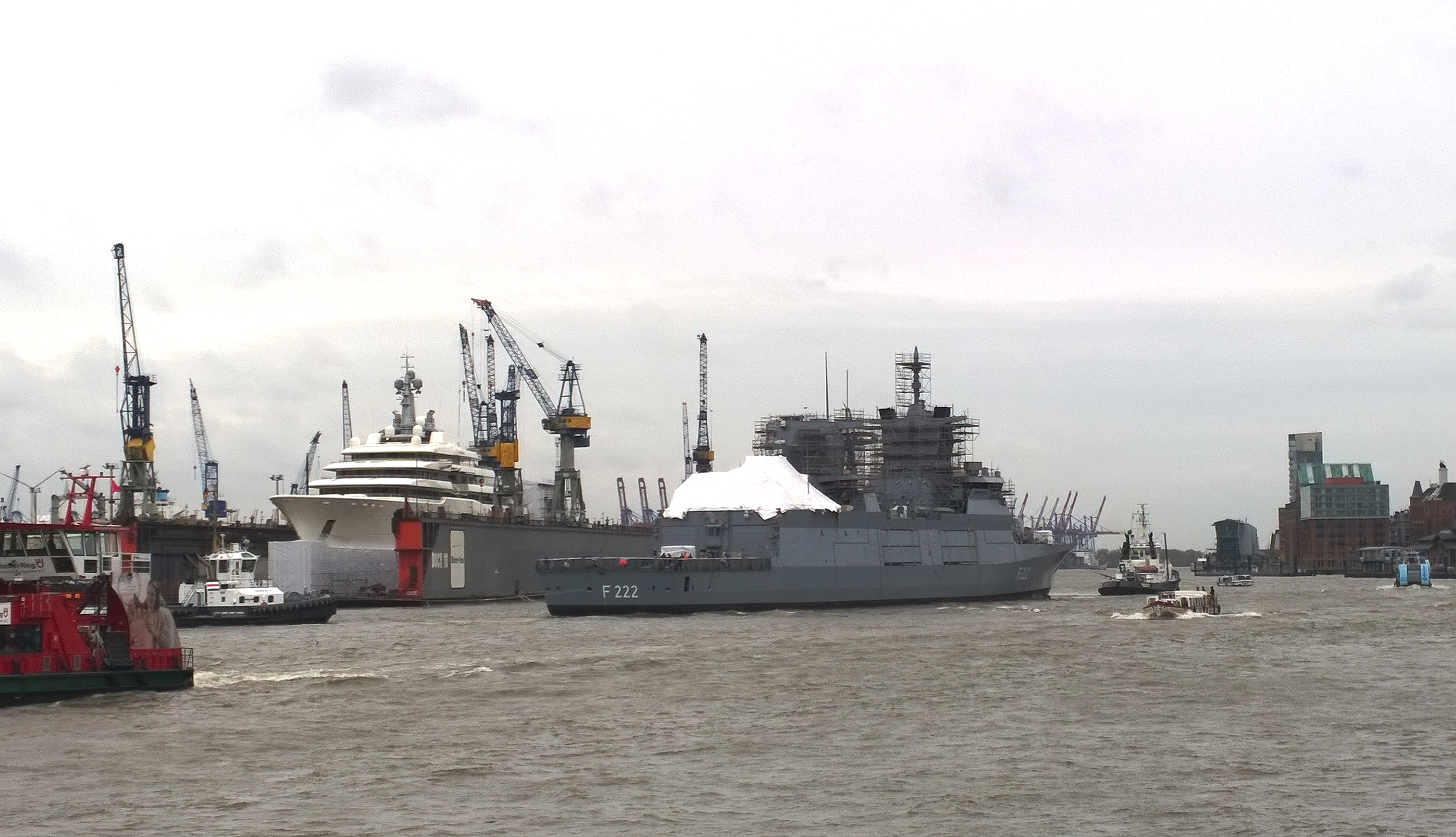
Unfinished Baden-Württemberg being towed on 10 November 2015

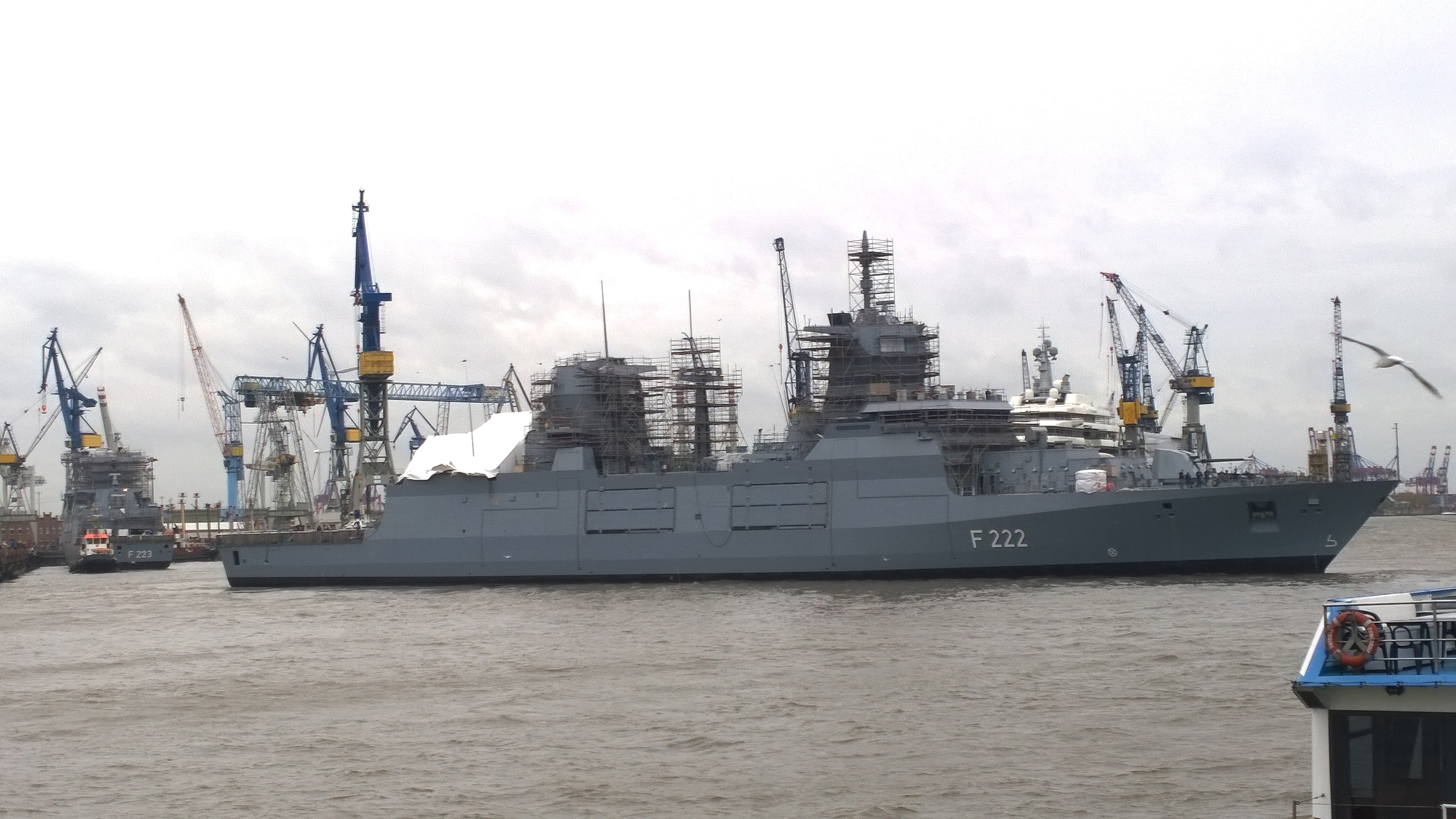
Unfinished Baden-Württemberg being towed on 10 November 2015

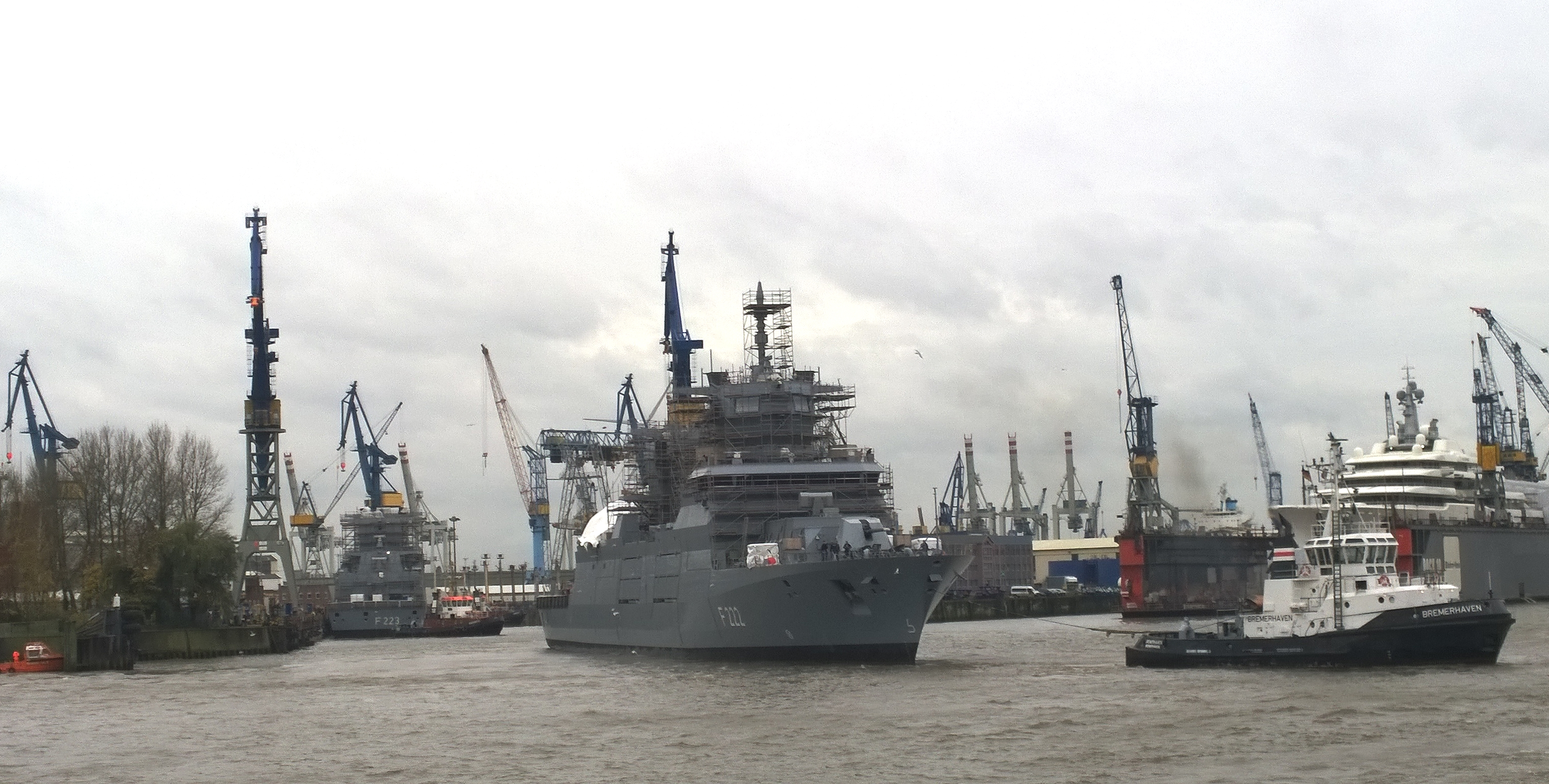
Unfinished Baden-Württemberg being towed on 10 November 2015

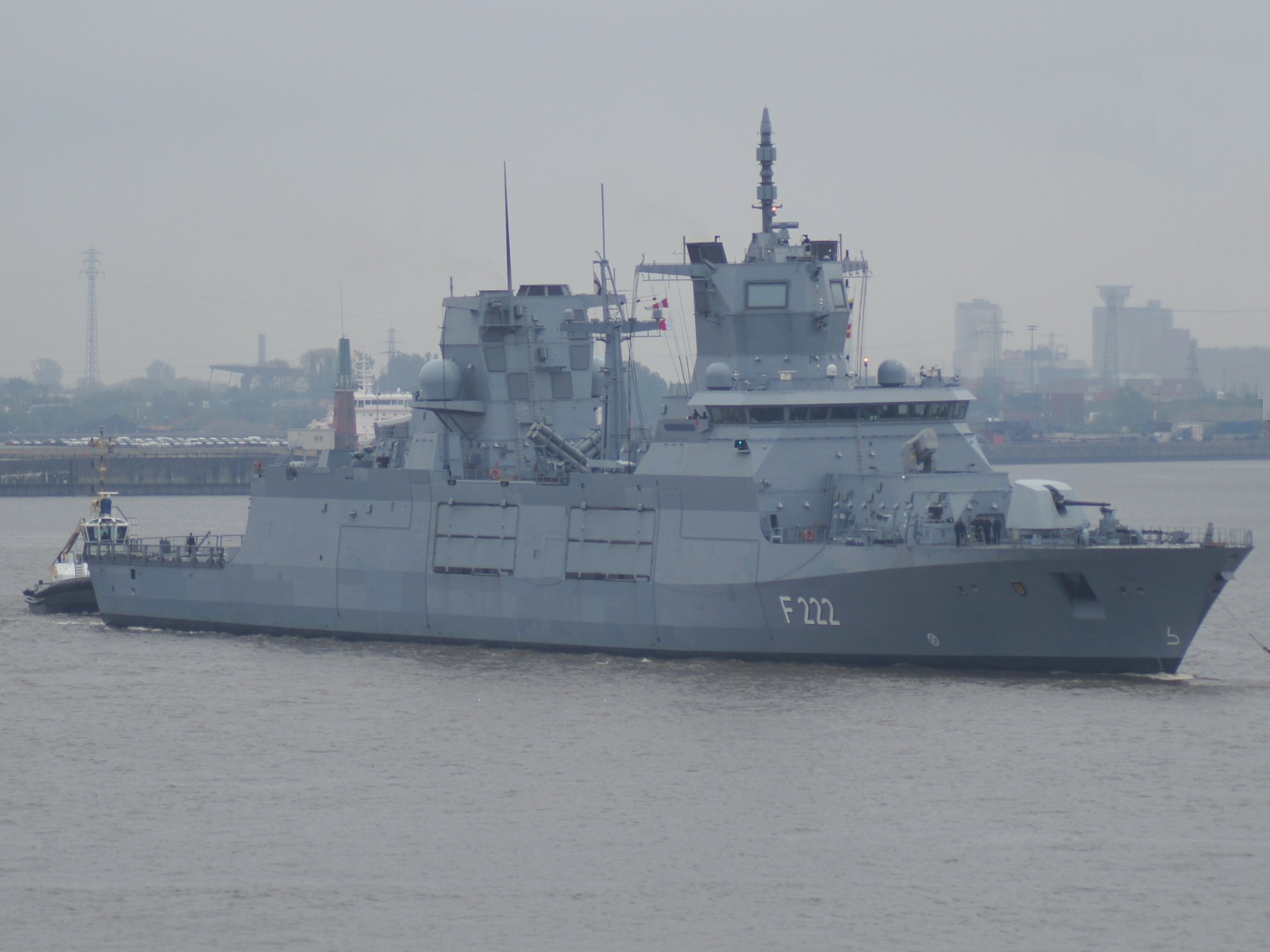
Baden-Württemberg underway in Hamburg on 29 April 2019
