= German frigate Nordrhein-Westfalen =

Baden-Württemberg-class Frigates of the German Navy

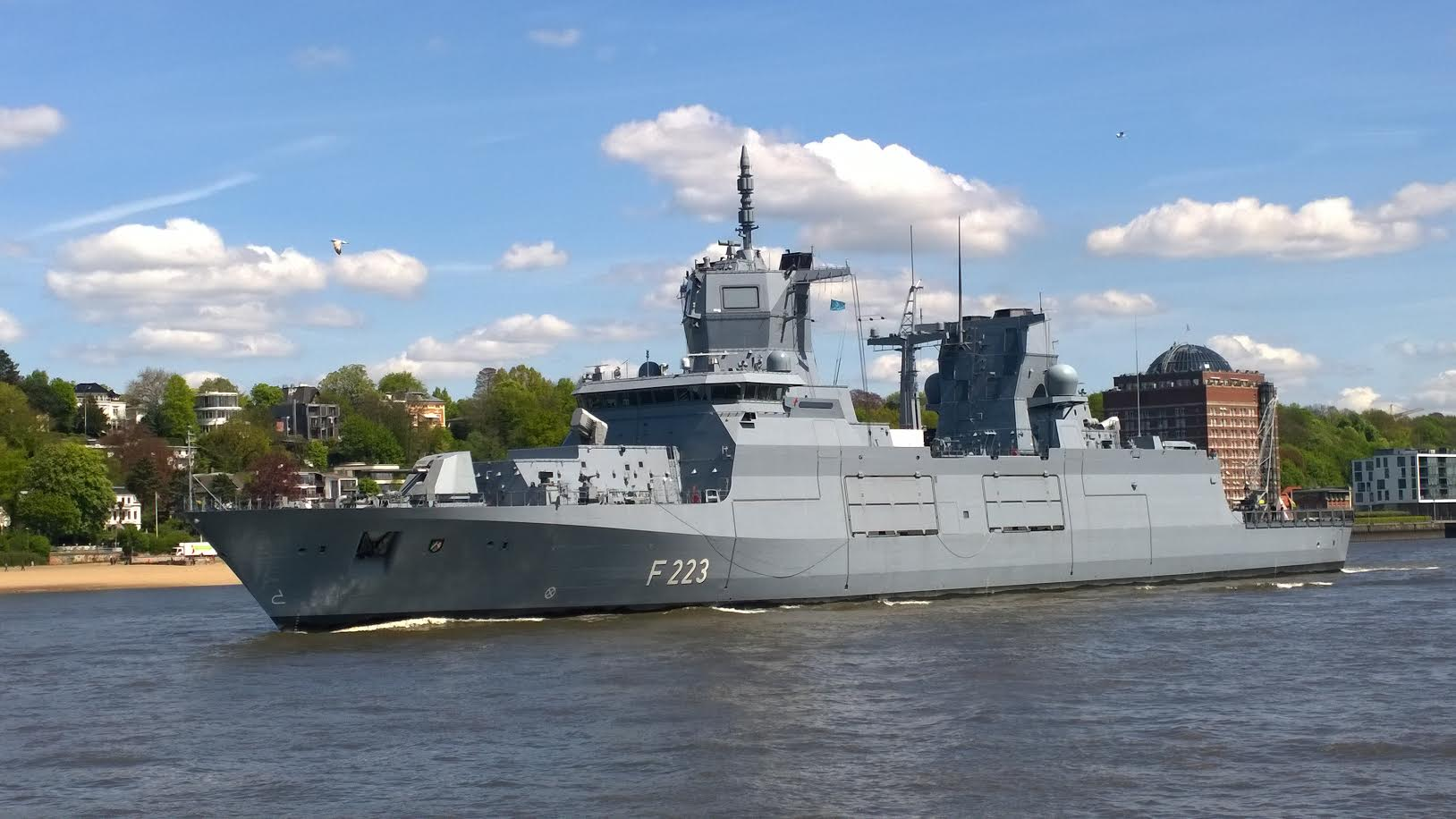
- Nordrhein-Westfalen on 9 May 2017.

History

Germany
- Name: Nordrhein-Westfalen
- Namesake: Nordrhein-Westfalen
- Port of registry: Hamburg, Germany
- Builder: Lürssen, Wolgast Blohm+Voss, Hamburg
- Laid down: 24 October 2012
- Launched: 16 April 2015
- Commissioned: 10 June 2020
- Identification: MMSI number: 211921000; Callsign: DRAE; Pennant number: F223
- Status: Active

General characteristics
- Class & type: Baden-Württemberg-class frigate
- Displacement: 7,200 tonnes
- Length: 149.52 m (490 ft 7 in)
- Beam: 18.80 m (61 ft 8 in)
- Draught: 5 m (16 ft 5 in)
- Propulsion: CODLAG; 1 × 20 MW gas turbine; 2 × 4.7 MW electric motors; 4 × 2.9 MW diesel generators; 3 × gearboxes: one for each shaft and one to crossconnect the gas turbine to them; 2 × shafts, driving controllable pitch propellers; 1 × 1 MW bow thruster
- Speed: 20 knots (37 km/h) on diesel only, 26 kn (48 km/h) max.
- Range: 4,000 nautical miles (7,400 km)
- Boats & landing craft carried: Submarine ROVs; 4 × 11 m (36 ft 1 in) RHIB, capable of more than 40 kn (74 km/h)
- Capacity: Space for two 6.1 m (20 ft 0 in) containers
- Complement: 190 (standard crew: 110)
- Sensors & processing systems: 1 × Cassidian TRS-4D AESA radar; 2(?) × navigation radars; IFF; diver and swimmer detection sonar (no anti-submarine sonar); Laser warning; KORA-18 Combined RADAR and COMMS ESM from GEDIS; Link 11, Link 16, Link 22 communications systems
- Electronic warfare & decoys: TKWA/MASS (Multi Ammunition Softkill System); ECM
- Armament: Naval guns: 1 × 127 mm lightweight Otobreda naval gun with guided VULCANO ammunition for land-attack missions (range: more than 100 km (62 mi)); 2 × 27 mm MLG 27 remote-controlled autocannons; 5 × 12.7 mm Hitrole-NT remote-controlled machine gun turrets; 2 × 12.7 mm heavy machine guns (manually controlled); Anti-air missiles: 2 × RAM Block II surface-to-air missile launcher/CIWS, 21 cells each; Anti-ship missiles: 8 × RGM-84 Harpoon anti-ship missiles (interim solution until joint sea/land attack missile RBS 15 MK4 becomes available); Non-Lethal: Water cannons
- Aircraft carried: 2 × NH-90 helicopters

Nordrhein-Westfalen (F223) is the second ship of the Baden-Württemberg-class frigates of the German Navy.

== Background ==
Nordrhein-Westfalen was designed and constructed by ARGE F125, a joint-venture of Thyssen-Krupp and Lürssen. She is part of the Baden-Württemberg class has the highest displacement of any class of frigate worldwide, and are used to replace the Bremen class.

== Construction and career ==
Nordrhein-Westfalen was laid down on 24 October, 2012 and launched on 16 April, 2015 in Hamburg. She was commissioned on 10 June, 2020.

In November, 2024, while patrolling the Baltic Sea near the port of Gdańsk, Poland, she encountered a Russian convoy consisting of an unnamed tanker and a corvette in the Baltic Sea, potentially breaking the international sanctions imposed on Russian oil. When a NH90 helicopter from Nordrhein-Westfalen was sent to inspect the Russian vessels more closely, the corvette responded with five red flares instead of routine radio communication. The incident became public when German foreign minister Annalena Baerbock mentioned the act of aggression at a NATO meeting a week later.

== Gallery ==
Nordrhein-Westfalen gallery

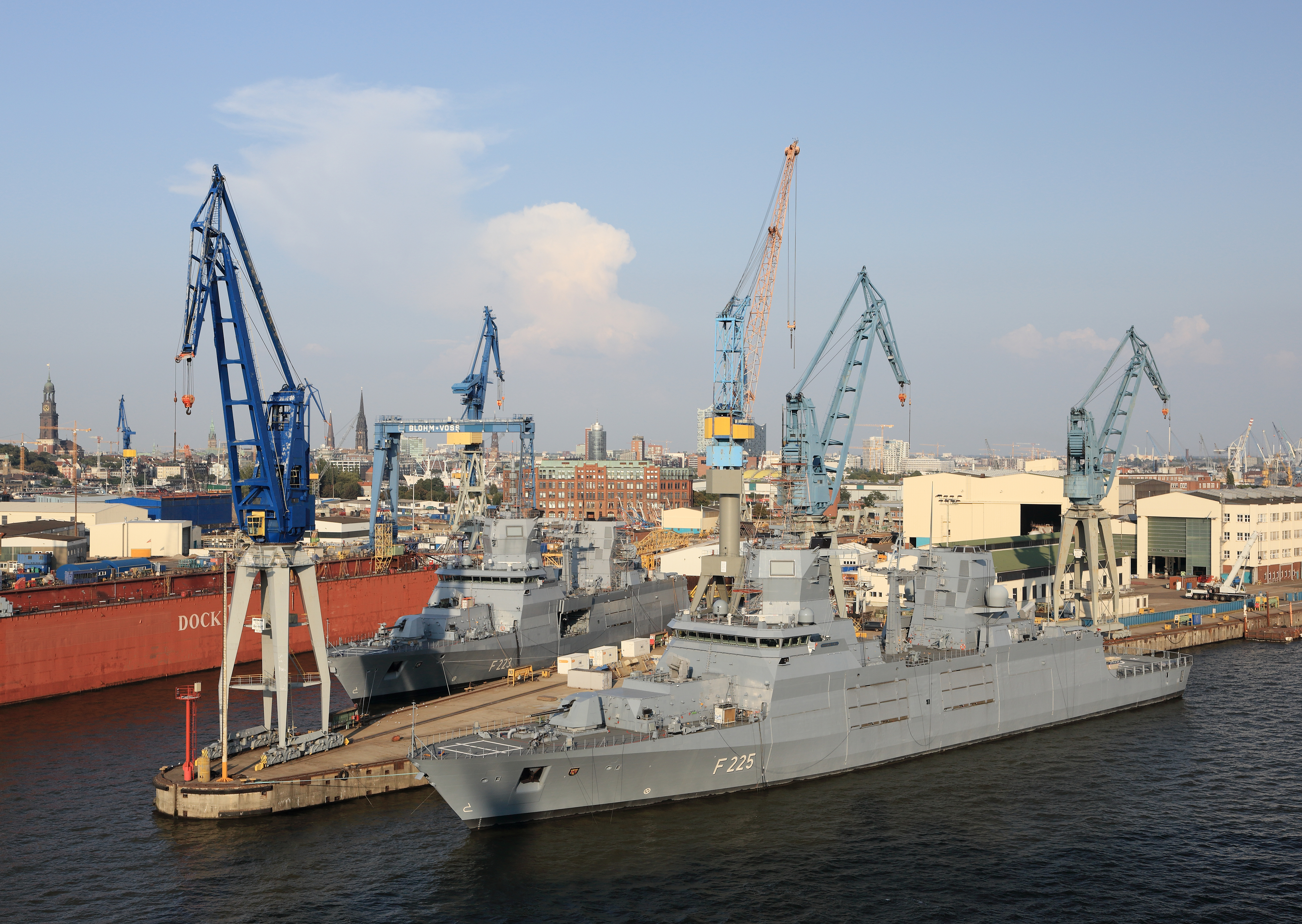
Nordrhein-Westfalen moored opposite Rheinland-Pfalz on 31 August 2019

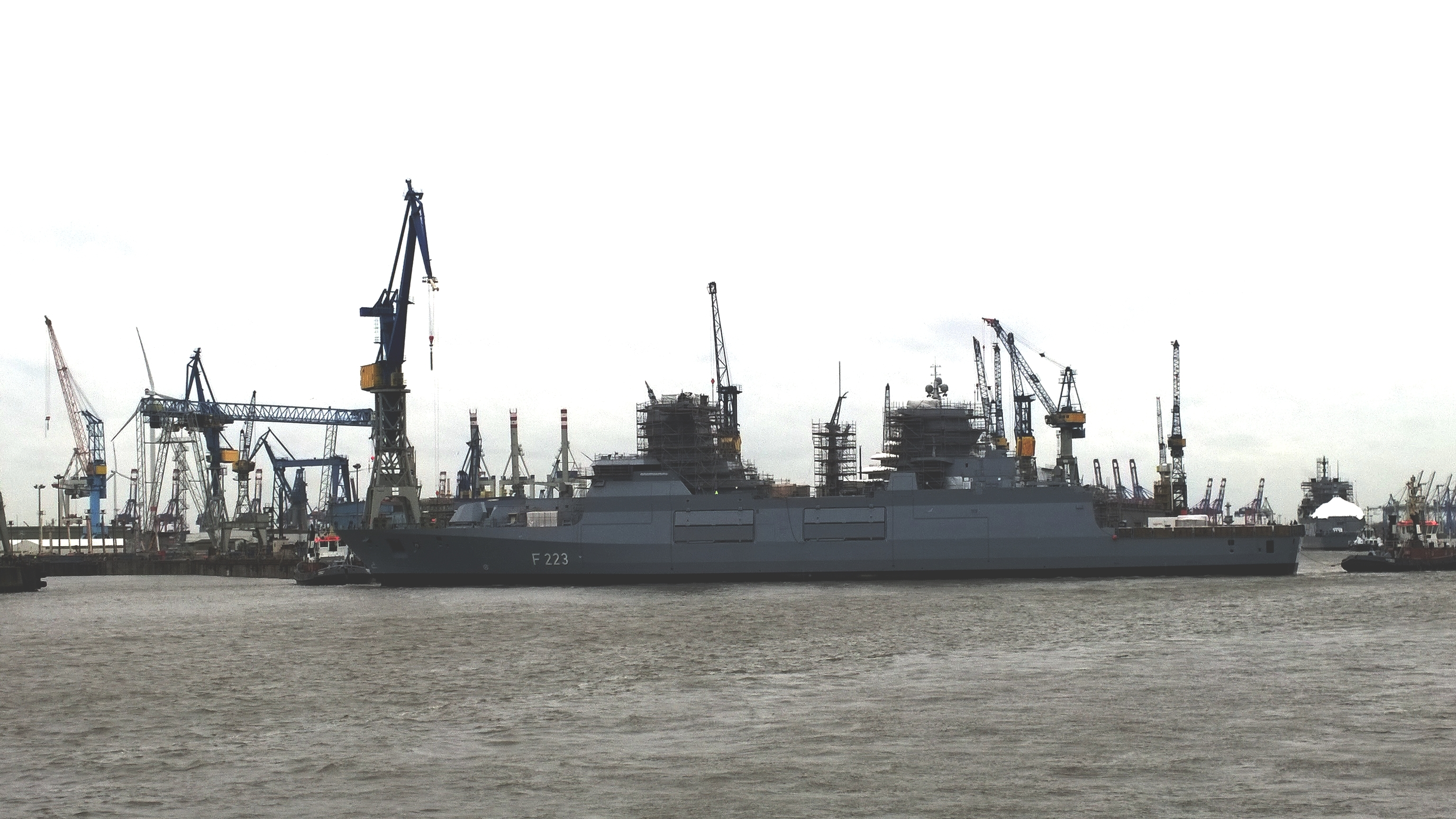
Nordrhein-Westfalen being towed into dock 17 of the Blohm and Voss (B&V) shipyard on 10 November 2015.

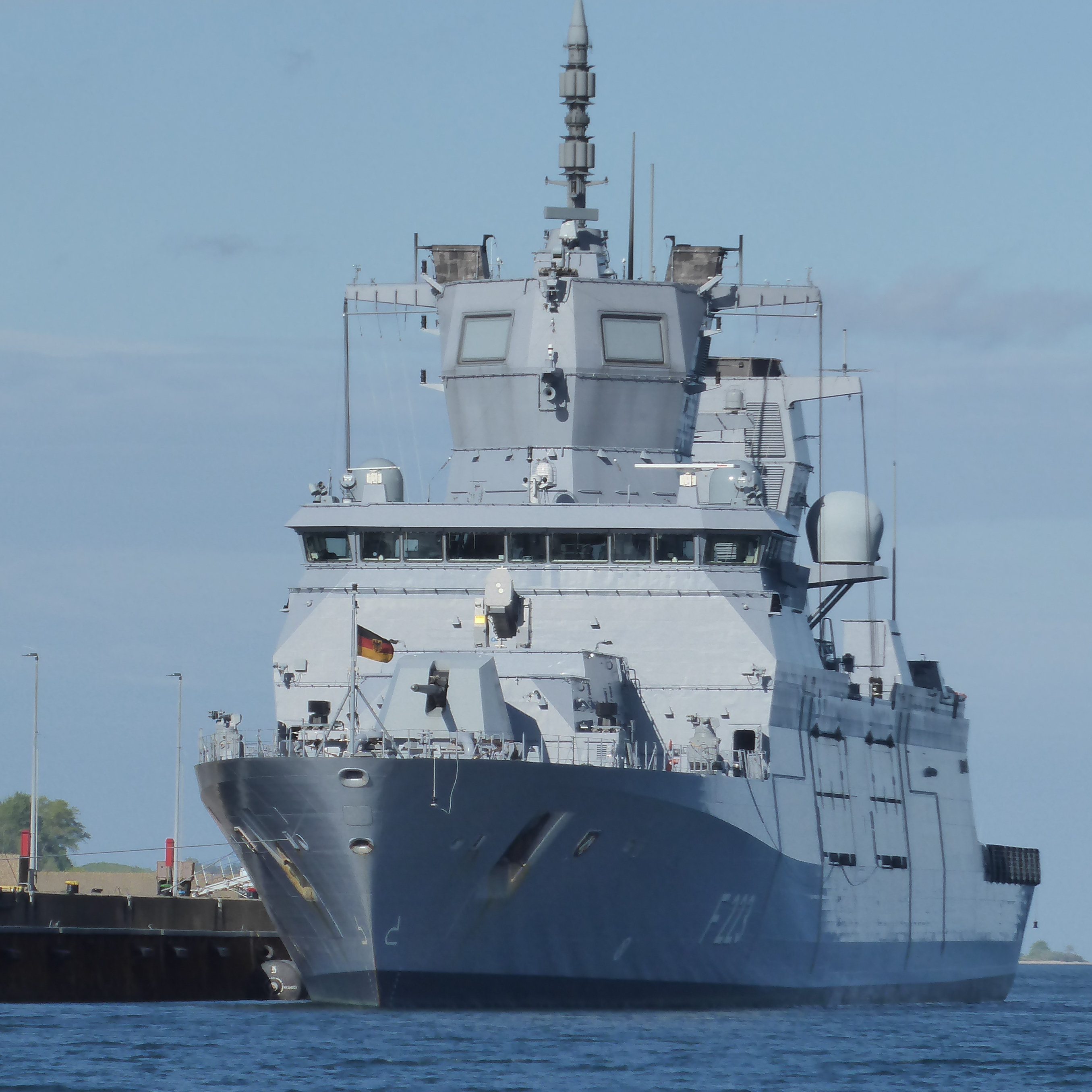
Nordrhein-Westfalen on 22 May 2019.
