= German ship Frankfurt am Main =

Berlin-class oiler

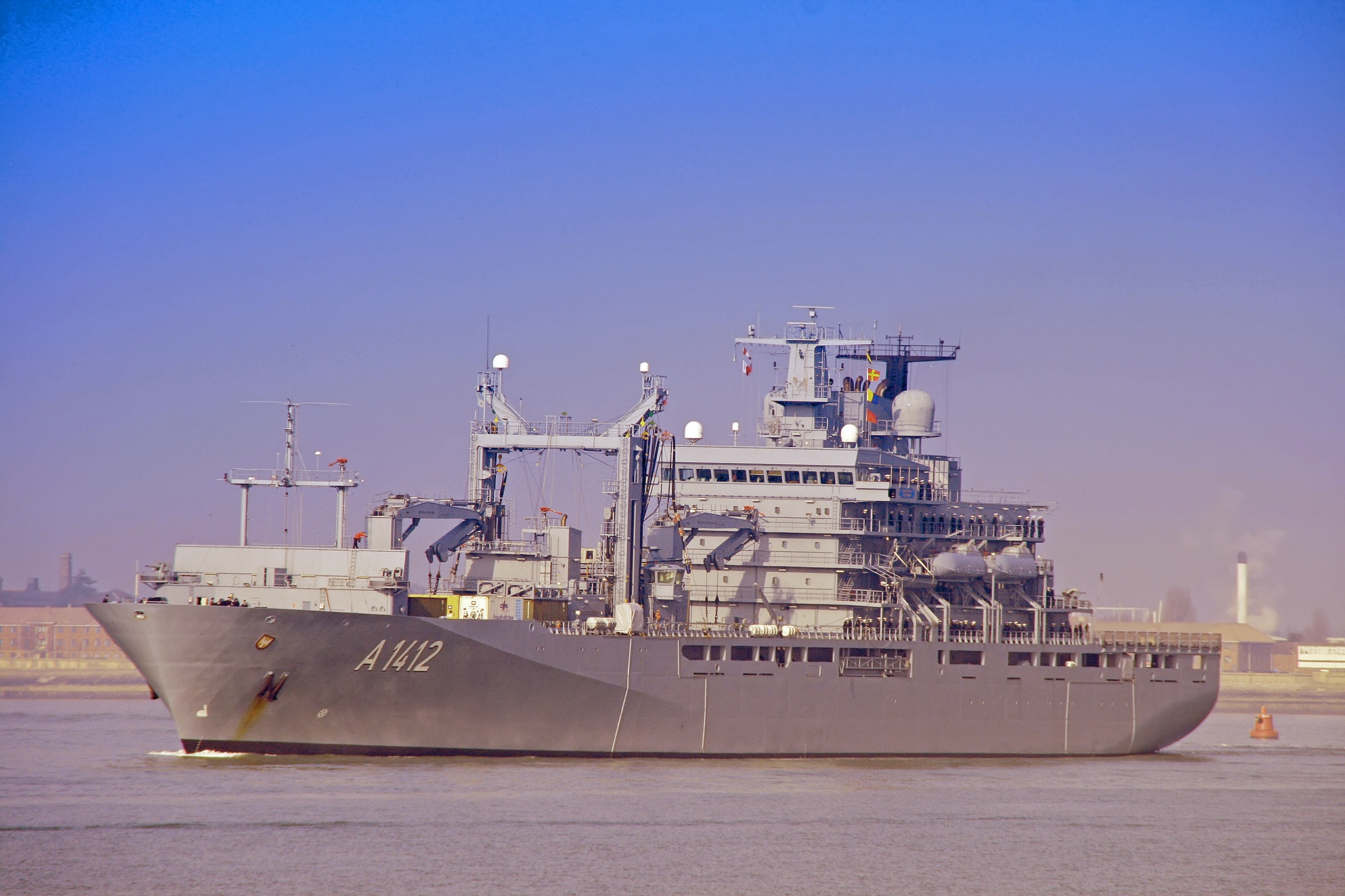
- Frankfurt am Main leaving Portsmouth, UK on 12 March 2012.

History

Germany
- Name: Frankfurt am Main
- Namesake: Frankfurt am Main
- Ordered: 22 August 1997
- Builder: Flensburger Schiffbau-Gesellschaft
- Launched: 5 January 2001
- Commissioned: 27 May 2002
- Home port: Wilhelmshaven, Germany
- Identification: MMSI number: 211211760; Callsign: DRKB; Pennant number: A1412
- Status: Active

General characteristics
- Type: Replenishment oiler
- Displacement: 20,240 t (19,920 long tons)
- Length: 173.7 m (569 ft 11 in)
- Beam: 24 m (78 ft 9 in)
- Draught: 7.4 m (24 ft 3 in)
- Propulsion: 2 × MAN Diesel 12V 32/40 diesel-engines, 10,555 kilowatts (14,154 bhp); 2 × reduction gears, 2 × controllable pitch five-bladed propellers; 1 × bow thruster; 4 × diesel generators
- Speed: 20 knots (37 km/h; 23 mph)
- Endurance: 45 days
- Armament: 4 × MLG 27 mm autocannons; Stinger surface-to-air missile (MANPADS)
- Aircraft carried: 2 × Sea King or NH90 helicopters
- Aviation facilities: Hangar and flight deck

Frankfurt am Main (A1412) is the second ship of the Berlin-class replenishment ships of the German Navy. Ordered in 1997, the vessel was constructed in Hamburg by Flensburger Schiffbau-Gesellschaft and was launched on 5 January 2001. Frankfurt am Main was commissioned on 27 May 2002 and is currently in service.

== Development and description ==
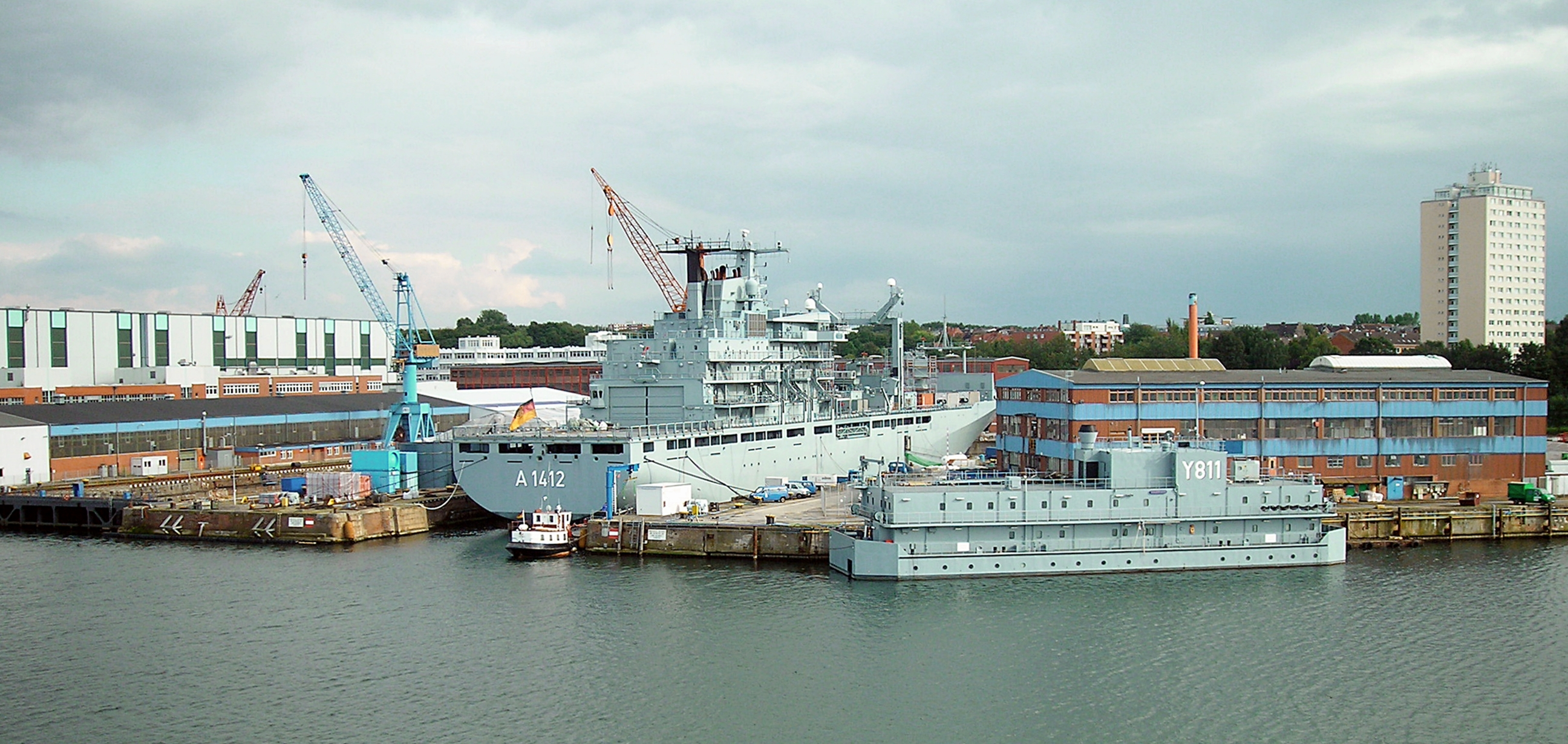
Frankfurt am Main at HDW shipyard in Kiel. Floating barracks Knurrhahn in the foreground on 17 August 2007

In German, this type of ship is called Einsatzgruppenversorger which can be translated as "task force supplier" though the official translation in English is "combat support ship". They are intended to support German naval units away from their home ports. The ships carry fuel, provisions, ammunition and other matériel and also provide medical services. The ships are named after German cities where German parliaments were placed.

The Berlin-class replenishment ships are the largest vessels of the German Navy. The Berlin-class replenishment ships are 173.7 metres (569 ft 11 in) long overall and 162 m (531 ft 6 in) between perpendiculars with a beam of 24 m (78 ft 9 in) and a draught of 7.4 m (24 ft 3 in). The vessels have a displacement of 10,115 tonnes (9,955 long tons) light and 20,243 t (19,923 long tons) at full load and measure 18,640 gross tonnage (GT). Constructed with a double hull, they have a pronounced bow bulb. The ships have capacity for 9,000 m^{3} (320,000 cu ft) or 7,600 t (7,500 long tons; 8,400 short tons) of marine diesel fuel, 600 m^{3} (21,000 cu ft) or 490 t (480 long tons; 540 short tons) of aviation fuel, 60 m^{3} (2,100 cu ft) or 126 t (124 long tons; 139 short tons) of lube oil, 100 t (98 long tons; 110 short tons) of spare parts, 230 t (230 long tons; 250 short tons) of provisions and 195 t (192 long tons; 215 short tons) of ammunition, or 71 t (70 long tons; 78 short tons) of fresh water, 100 t (98 long tons; 110 short tons) consumables, 1,075 t (1,058 long tons; 1,185 short tons) of supplies and 230 t of provisions. The vessels have two replenishment at sea stations, one to each per side of the ship and two electro-hydraulic container and cargo cranes. The Berlin class have capacity for 86 TEUs of shipping containers and can stack 26 TEUs in two layers on the upper deck. The ships have provision for a Marineeinsatzrettungzentrum (MERZ) unit which is a modular operations rescue centre aboard the ship. The MERZ is capable of holding 50 patients and providing them with emergency surgery, intensive care, internal medicine and dental services.

The first two vessels of the class, Berlin and Frankfurt am Main are powered by two MAN Diesel 12V 32/40 diesel-engines, creating 10,555 kilowatts (14,154 bhp) with two reduction gears turning two controllable pitch five-bladed propellers and powering one bow thruster. They have four Deutz-MWM diesel generators. The ships have a maximum speed of 20 knots (37 km/h; 23 mph) and have an endurance of 45 days. The Berlin-class ships have a helipad aft and a hangar and can support two helicopters, either the Sea King or NH90 models which can be used for vertical replenishment. The vessels are equipped with radar and mine avoidance sonar and one of the radars is situated aft for use during helicopter takeoff and landing.

The Berlin class are armed with four MLG 27 mm (1.1 in) autocannon for anti-aircraft defence and four 12.7 mm (0.50 in) machine guns. The MLG 27 replaced older Bofors 40 mm (1.6 in)/70 guns. The vessels are also fitted for but not with Stinger surface-to-air missile (MANPADS) for point defence. The vessels have a complement of 159 plus 74 embarked. (Note: The number of crew varies between sources, ranging from 139 plus 94 embarked to 233.)

== Construction and career ==
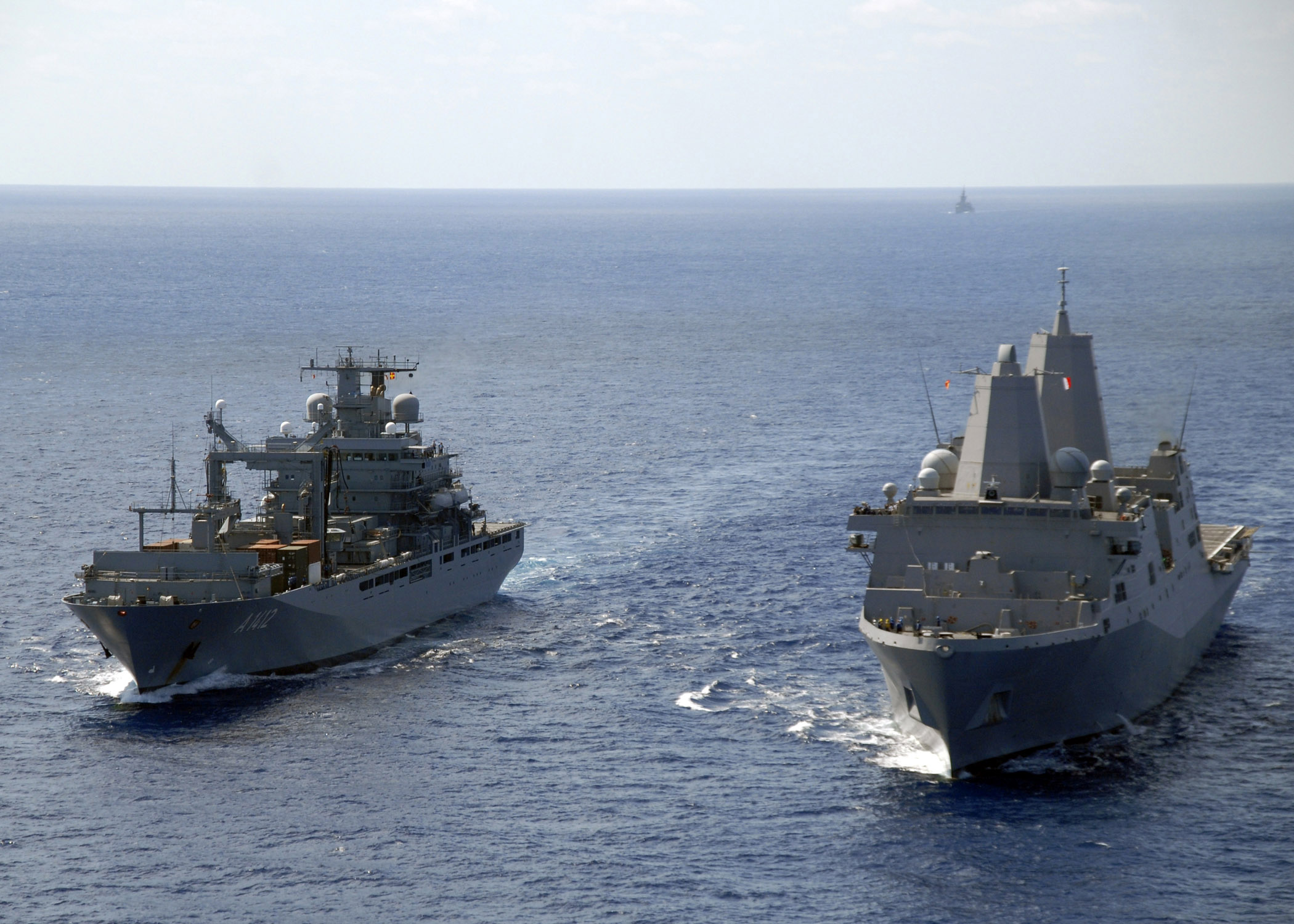
Frankfurt am Main (left) alongside USS Mesa Verde during UNITAS Gold on 26 April 2009

The initial plan for the Berlin class comprised four ships. However, in 1994, the number of ships to be ordered was cut back to just one. A second ship was authorized in the 1996 budget and Frankfurt am Main was ordered in June 1998. The ship was constructed by a consortium composed of Flensburger Schiffbau-Gesellschaft which constructed the hull, Lürssen the electrictal systems and Krügerwerft the superstructure, outfitting and sea trials. The ship was laid down on 28 August 2000 and launched on 5 January 2001 at Hamburg. The ship was christened by sponsor Petra Roth, the mayor of Frankfurt am Main. Frankfurt am Main then underwent sea trials beginning on 19 February 2002. She was commissioned on 27 May 2002.

Her first home port was Kiel, since 26 September 2012, she has been stationed at the Heppenser Groden naval base in Wilhelmshaven. Frankfurt am Main worked with USS Mesa Verde during mock underway replenishment in the 50th iteration of UNITAS Gold on 26 April 2009.

In 2012, the ship was sent to Canada ahead of that nation's procurement of future replenishment ships. This was an attempt to draw Canadian interest in acquiring ship's of a similar design. In 2013, the mission was successful, as the Canadians chose the Berlin class as the basis for their new auxiliary ships.

On 16 March 2017, she was damaged in the evening when entering homeport Wilhelmshaven. When reversing in the port, Frankfurt am Main's stern collided with the concrete porch of the lock island. The ship was repaired at Kiel from June to September. After returning to service, Frankfurt am Main sailed for the Aegean Sea to join Standing NATO Maritime Group 2, remaining with the unit until March 2018.

In 2015 the Marineeinsatzrettungszentrum (MERZ) (English: Marine Rescue Centre) burned down at the shipyard in Kiel. MERZ was a containerized-based mobile hospital consisting of 26 containers intended to be flexible to adapt to the navy's needs. After the mobile version's destruction, the navy chose to go with a built-in option, with flexibility diminishing in importance. They chose Frankfurt am Main to host the new integrierte Marineeinsatz-Rettungszentum (iMERZ) (English: Integrated Marine Rescue Centre). Beginning in February 2020, the ship began a refit to incorporate the iMERZ into the ship's citadel to allow for CBRN defence. The navy intended to construct the iMERZ separately and after opening part of Frankfurt am Main's hull, slide the iMERZ in. However, a manufacturing defect led the iMERZ to be too large for the spot in Frankfurt am Main's hull and had to be rebuilt, leading to delays in the ship's return to sea, which is not expected before 2022.

In 2024, Frankfurt am Main was selected to undertake an around the world deployment, accompanying the frigate Baden-Württemberg. The tanker along with Baden-Württemberg participated in the Maritime Partnership Exercise (MPX) with the Indian Navy's INS Delhi from 21 to 23 October 2024 in the Bay of Bengal and the Indian Ocean.
