= German frigate Sachsen-Anhalt =

Baden-Württemberg-class Frigates

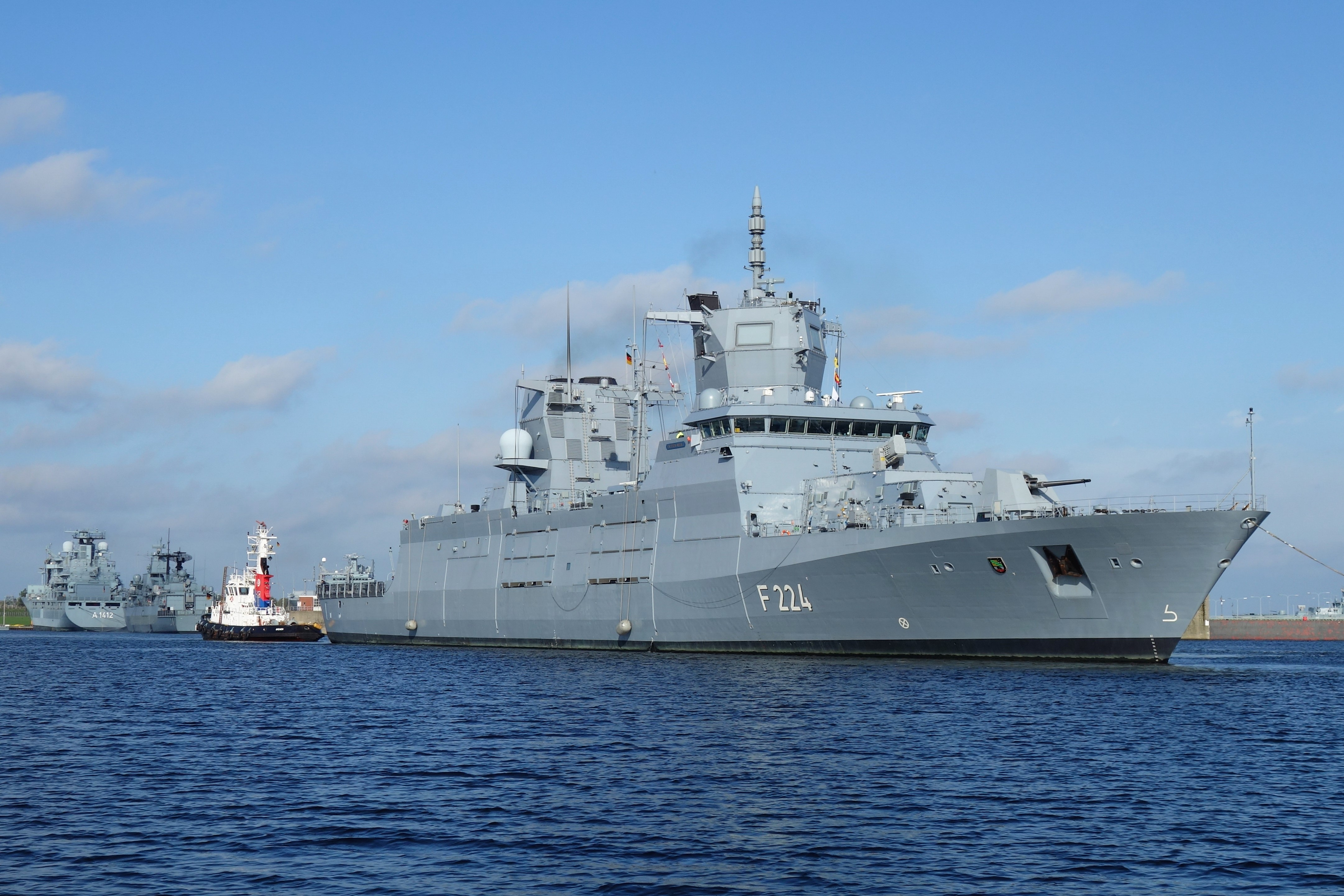
- Sachsen-Anhalt being towed on 16 October 2019.

History

Germany
- Name: Sachsen-Anhalt
- Namesake: Sachsen-Anhalt
- Port of registry: Hamburg, Germany
- Builder: Lürssen, Wolgast Blohm+Voss, Hamburg
- Laid down: 4 June 2014
- Launched: 4 March 2016
- Commissioned: 17 May 2021
- Identification: MMSI number: 211922000; Callsign: DRAF; Pennant number: F224
- Status: Active

General characteristics
- Class & type: Baden-Württemberg-class frigate
- Displacement: 7,200 tonnes
- Length: 149.52 m (490 ft 7 in)
- Beam: 18.80 m (61 ft 8 in)
- Draught: 5 m (16 ft 5 in)
- Propulsion: CODLAG; 1 × 20 MW gas turbine; 2 × 4.7 MW electric motors; 4 × 2.9 MW diesel generators; 3 × gearboxes: one for each shaft and one to crossconnect the gas turbine to them; 2 × shafts, driving controllable pitch propellers; 1 × 1 MW bow thruster
- Speed: 20 knots (37 km/h) on diesel only, 26 kn (48 km/h) max.
- Range: 4,000 nautical miles (7,400 km)
- Boats & landing craft carried: Submarine ROVs; 4 × 11 m (36 ft 1 in) RHIB, capable of more than 40 kn (74 km/h)
- Capacity: Space for two 6.1 m (20 ft 0 in) containers
- Complement: 190 (standard crew: 110)
- Sensors & processing systems: 1 × Cassidian TRS-4D AESA radar; 2(?) × navigation radars; IFF; diver and swimmer detection sonar (no anti-submarine sonar); Laser warning; KORA-18 Combined RADAR and COMMS ESM from GEDIS; Link 11, Link 16, Link 22 communications systems
- Electronic warfare & decoys: TKWA/MASS (Multi Ammunition Softkill System); ECM
- Armament: Naval guns: 1 × 127 mm lightweight Otobreda naval gun with guided VULCANO ammunition for land-attack missions (range: more than 100 km (62 mi)); 2 × 27 mm MLG 27 remote-controlled autocannons; 5 × 12.7 mm Hitrole-NT remote-controlled machine gun turrets; 2 × 12.7 mm heavy machine guns (manually controlled); Anti-air missiles: 2 × RAM Block II surface-to-air missile launcher/CIWS, 21 cells each; Anti-ship missiles: 8 × RGM-84 Harpoon anti-ship missiles (interim solution until joint sea/land attack missile RBS 15 MK4 becomes available); Non-Lethal: Water cannons
- Aircraft carried: 2 × NH-90 helicopters

Sachsen-Anhalt (F224) is the third ship of the Baden-Württemberg-class frigates of the German Navy.

== Background ==
Sachsen-Anhalt was designed and constructed by ARGE F125, a joint-venture of Thyssen-Krupp and Lürssen. She is part of the Baden-Württemberg class have the highest displacement of any class of frigate worldwide and are used to replace the Bremen class.

== Construction and career ==
Sachsen-Anhalt was laid down on 4 June 2014 and launched on 4 March 2016 at Hamburg, Germany. After considerable delay following her launch to repair defects identified during construction she was delivered to the Navy in March 2021. She was commissioned on 17 May 2021.

On 2 September 2026, the ship test-launched the LORA quasi-ballistic missile in two exercises in the North Atlantic, both of which successfully hit their targets. The navy used the tests to evaluate the missile system before deciding to adopt it. This was the first time the German Navy launched a ballistic missile at sea.

== Gallery ==
Sachsen-Anhalt gallery

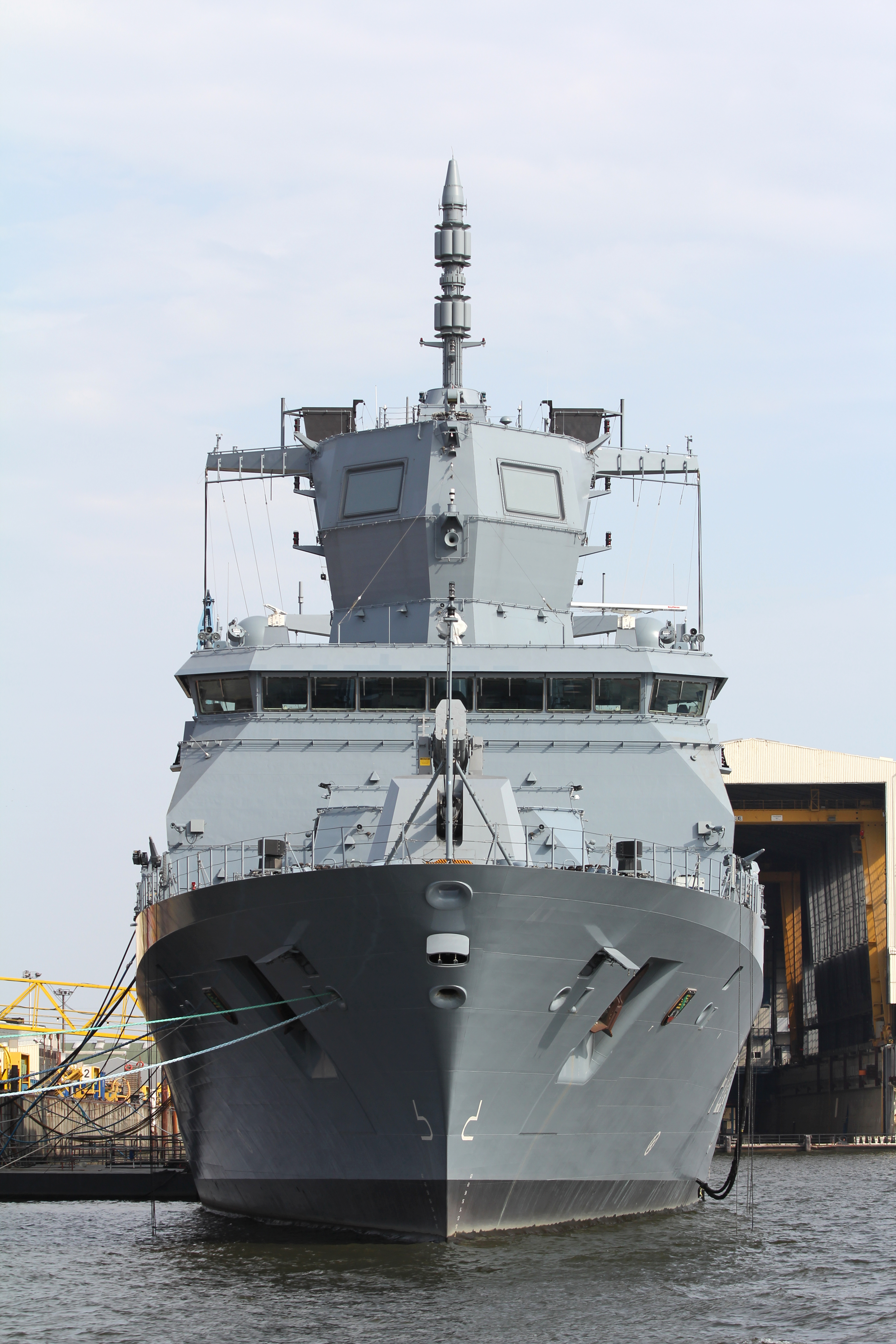
Sachsen-Anhalt on 9 August 2018.

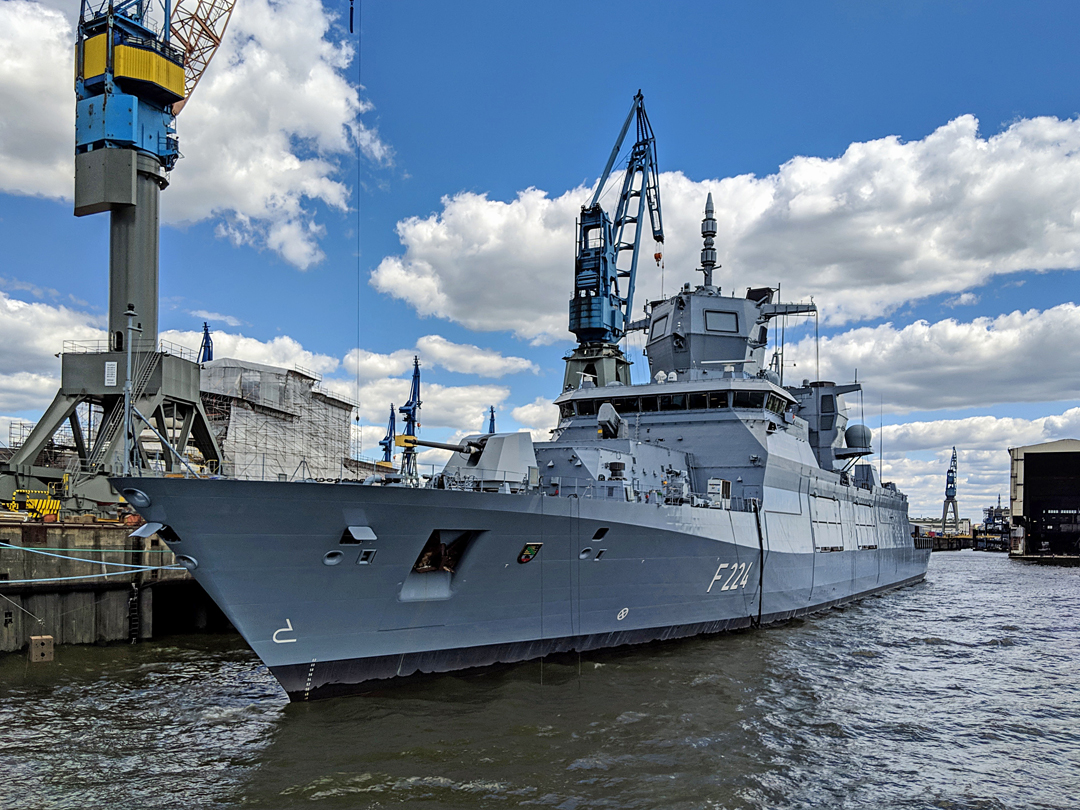
Sachsen-Anhalt on 30 June 2018.
