= Baden-Württemberg-class frigate =

Series of frigates of the German Navy

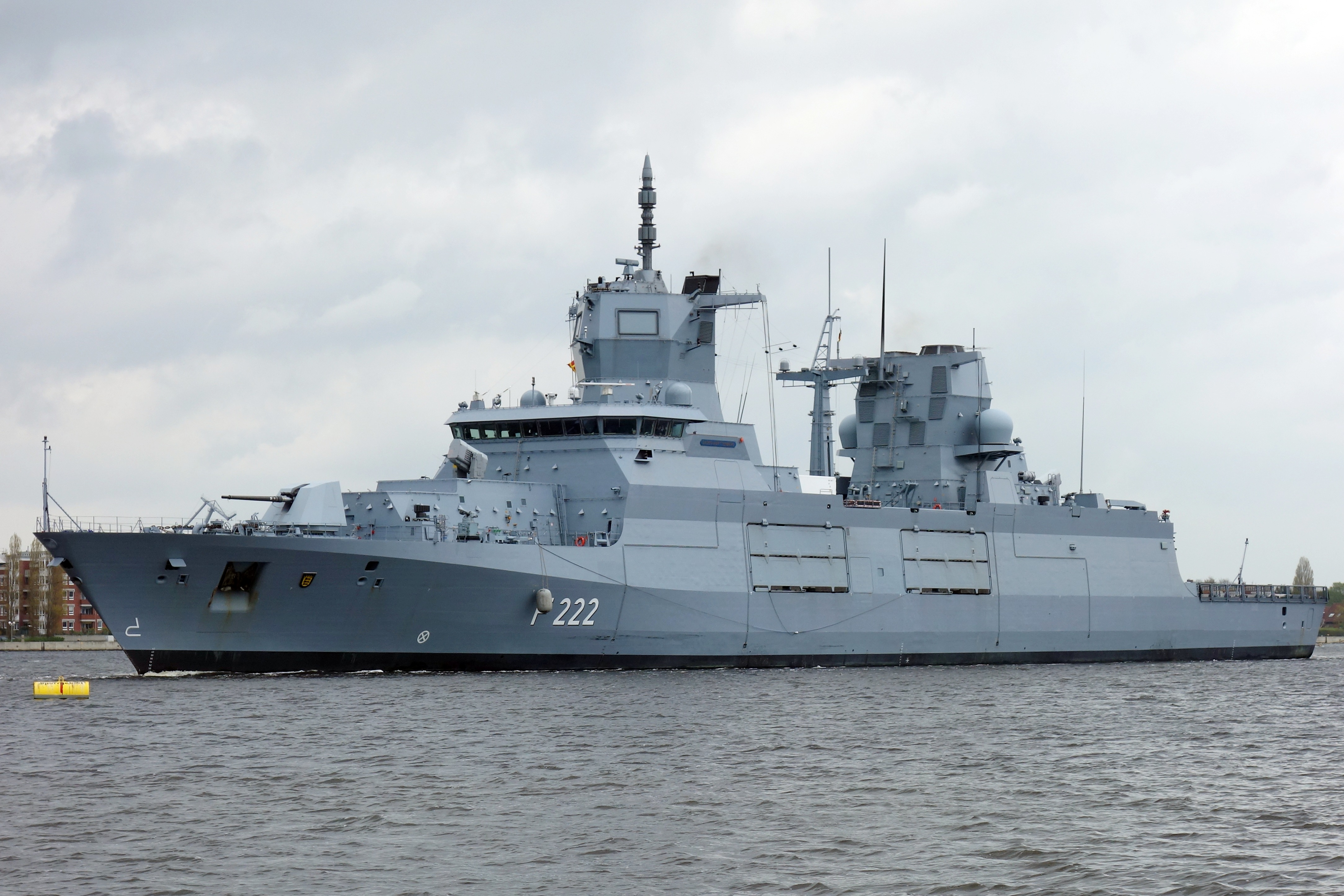
- German Navy frigate Baden-Württemberg in Wilhelmshaven, 2017

Class overview
- Builders: ThyssenKrupp Marine Systems/Lürssen; Peene-Werft, Wolgast
- Operators: German Navy
- Preceded by: Bremen class
- Cost: ca. €775 million (2007) (equivalent to €959.81 million in 2021) per ship
- Built: 2011–2022
- In commission: 2019–present
- Planned: 4
- Active: 4

General characteristics
- Type: Frigate
- Displacement: 7,200 t (7,100 long tons)
- Length: 149.52 m (490 ft 7 in)
- Beam: 18.80 m (61 ft 8 in)
- Draft: 5.40 m (17 ft 9 in)
- Installed power: 43,000 shp (32,000 kW)
- Propulsion: CODLAG: 1 × GE LM2500 gas turbine (20 MW (27,000 shp)); 4 × MTU 20V 4000 M53B diesel generators (3.015 MW (4,043 shp)); 2 × Siemens electric-drive motors (4.5 MW (6,000 shp)); 3 × Renk gearboxes: one for each shaft and one to cross-connect the gas turbine to them; 2 × Schottel shafts, driving controllable pitch propellers; 1 × Jastram bow thruster ((1 MW (1,300 shp))
- Speed: 20 knots (37 km/h; 23 mph) on diesel only, 28 knots (52 km/h; 32 mph) max.
- Range: 8,000 nmi (15,000 km; 9,200 mi)
- Boats & landing craft carried: Submarine ROVs; 4 × 11 m (36 ft) RHIB, capable of more than 40 knots (74 km/h; 46 mph)
- Capacity: Space for two 6.1 m (20 ft 0 in) containers
- Complement: 190 (standard crew: 110)
- Sensors & processing systems: 4 × Hensoldt TRS-4D AESA fixed planar arrays radars; 2 × navigation radars from Anschütz (X and S-band) and the INBS Synapsis; IFF; diver and swimmer detection sonar (no anti-submarine sonar); Laser warning; 1 × KORA-18 Combined RADAR and COMMS ESM from GEDIS; 2 × MSP 600 video and infrared target tracker; 1 × SIMONE 360 degree infrared monitoring; Link 11, Link 16, Link 22 communications systems
- Electronic warfare & decoys: TKWA/MASS (Multi Ammunition Softkill System) with 4 launchers; ECM
- Armament: Naval guns: 1 × 127 mm (5") lightweight Otobreda naval gun with guided Vulcano ammunition for land-attack missions (range: more than 100 km (62 mi)); 2 × 27 mm MLG 27 remote-controlled autocannons; 5 × 12.7 mm Hitrole-NT remote-controlled machine gun turrets; 2 × 12.7 mm heavy machine guns (manually controlled); Close-In Weapon System: 2 × RAM Block II launchers, 21 missiles each; Anti-ship missiles: 8 × RGM-84 Harpoon anti-ship missiles (interim solution until joint sea/land attack Naval Strike Missile becomes available); Non-Lethal: Water cannons
- Aircraft carried: 2 × NH-90 helicopters

The F125 Baden-Württemberg-class frigates are a series of frigates of the German Navy, which were designed and constructed by ARGE F125, a joint-venture of Thyssen-Krupp and Lürssen. The Baden-Württemberg class is the heaviest displacement of any class of frigates worldwide. They replaced the F122 Bremen class.

They are primarily designed for stabilization, crisis management, conflict prevention, and international intervention operations, asymmetric threat control at sea and support of special forces. Despite the ship's substantial size and weight, the ship carries no vertical launching system (VLS), medium or long-range surface-to-air missile, or anti-submarine torpedo.

Lack of firepower makes the ship class unsuitable for major naval battles. Therefore the German Navy currently is undergoing plans to increase the F125’s armament. This will include the installment of the IRIS-T SLM missile system.

== Design ==
=== Background ===
In contrast to the Bremen class, which were built with Cold War-era scenarios in mind, the Baden-Württemberg-class frigates will have much enhanced land-attack capabilities. This will better suit the frigates in possible future peacekeeping and peacemaking missions. For such reasons, the frigates will also mount non-lethal weapons.

=== General characteristics ===
Major design goals are reduced radar, infrared and acoustic signatures (stealth technology), something that was introduced to the German Navy with the Brandenburg-class frigates and was further developed with the Sachsen-class frigates and Braunschweig-class corvettes.

Other important requirements are long maintenance periods: It should be possible to deploy Baden-Württemberg-class frigates for up to two years away from homeports with an average sea operation time of more than 5,000 hours per year (nearly 60%) which includes operation under tropical conditions. For this reason, a combined diesel-electric and gas arrangement has been chosen for the machinery. This allows the substitution of large and powerful diesel engines for propulsion and sets of smaller diesel generators for electric power generation with a pool of med-sized diesel generators, reducing the number of different engines.

To enhance survivability of the frigates, important systems are laid out in the two island principle, i.e. present in at least two different places within the ship. This is visible in the superstructures, which are split in two larger pyramidal deckhouses. The aerials of the Cassidian TRS-4D active electronically scanned array radar will be distributed over the two pyramids. This will ensure that the ship remains operational in case of severe damage, such as accidents or enemy action. It will also allow the frigates to keep station if needed when something breaks down and no replacement is available.

In June 2007, an initial batch of four frigates was ordered by the German Navy. The initial batch of four ships costs around 2.2 billion euros. In April 2007, a contract with Finmeccanica was signed for delivery of Otobreda 127 mm (5 in) Vulcano main guns and remote-controlled light gun turrets for the Baden-Württemberg class. The initially considered 155 mm (6 in) MONARC gun, and the naval GMLRS rocket launcher, were dropped due to problems with the navalization of these land-based systems. The deal with Oto Melara had become opportune, because Germany still had countertrade obligations towards Italy, as Italy had purchased two German Type 212 submarines.

The Baden-Württemberg-class frigates are equipped with one 127mm main gun, two 27mm auto cannons and seven 12.7mm machine guns for defence against air and surface targets. The vessels also have non-lethal weapons, such as water cannons and searchlights for non-provocative deterrence and defence. Beyond capabilities that might be provided by the ship's helicopter(s), sensors for anti-submarine warfare have not been integrated into the platform. The ship's air defence capability is limited to relatively short-range point defence systems.

=== Problems ===
The lead ship – Baden-Württemberg – was initially delivered with several problems. These included a persistent 1.3° list to starboard and the fact that the ship was dramatically overweight which would limit its performance, increase its cost of operation, and most importantly, adversely affect the German Navy's ability to add future upgrades to the somewhat sparsely outfitted vessel. There were also problems with the frigate's operations room from where the highly automated ship will be controlled. As a result, the German defense procurement agency BAAINBw refused to commission the vessel, making it the first time in German naval history that the BAAINBw has refused to commission a ship and returned it to its builder.

Baden-Württemberg was eventually accepted by the BAAINBw on 30 April 2019 and commissioned in June 2019, over two years later than originally planned.

All vessels in the class were delivered by January 2022. Full operational capability for the first ship in the class, Baden-Württemberg, was expected in mid-2023. In 2024, Baden-Württemberg was selected to undertake an around the world deployment, accompanied by the support ship Frankfurt am Main.

== Upgrades ==
=== IRIS-T integration ===
In December 2024, a feasibility study to integrate the IRIS-T SLM system on the Baden-Württemberg class frigates was approved by the BAAINBw. The IRIS-T SLM is an air defence system that has a range of 40 kilometers and an altitude ceiling of 20 kilometers. If installed, it would enhance the frigates by increasing their ability to defend against a variety of aerial threats. In less than 10 months the navalized IRIS-T SLM system transitioned from concept into an actual demonstrator. During the German Navy’s Maritime Firing Exercise 2025 (MFE 2025) this demonstrator was successfully tested aboard the Baden-Württemberg.

In June 2026, Diehl announced the solution of two dedicated launchers with 16 IRIS-T SLM missiles each to be mounted on the upper deck, in a permanent vertical position, and under which a deflector plate would be installed to protect the deck from the heat. A prototype of the new launcher is estimated to be completed as early as 2027, while firing at sea might possibly occur later that year.

The budget for the integration of the IRIS-T SLM was approved in September 2026, and a contract for the development of the prototype and a testing phase was signed in October 2026.

=== Combat system ===
The budget to develop a new combat system for the German Navy was approved by the parliament in November 2025. The combat system is known in the German Navy as the FüWES-M (Standardisierung maritimer Führungs- und Waffeneinsatzsysteme). A total of €250 million is budgeted, with a first phase of €90 million expected. This contract is expected to extend until 2029.

The expected system is the Aegis International Fire Control Loop integrated the Lockheed Martin Canada's CMS330 tactical interface in a similar fashion to the Canadian River-class destroyers. The system is ITAR-free Rheinmetall is trying to compete against Lockheed Martin Canada. The system is designed to equip the F127 air-defence frigate, and will also be used with the F125.

== Ships in the class ==
| Pennant number | Name | Builder | Laid down | Launched | Commissioned | Status |
|---|---|---|---|---|---|---|
| F222 | Baden-Württemberg | ARGE F125 | 2 November 2011 | 12 December 2013 | 17 June 2019 | In active service |
| F223 | Nordrhein-Westfalen | ARGE F125 | 24 October 2012 | 16 April 2015 | 10 June 2020 | In active service |
| F224 | Sachsen-Anhalt | ARGE F125 | 4 June 2014 | 4 March 2016 | 17 May 2021 | In active service |
| F225 | Rheinland-Pfalz | ARGE F125 | 29 January 2015 | 24 May 2017 | 13 July 2022 | In active service |

== Gallery ==
Baden-Württemberg-class gallery

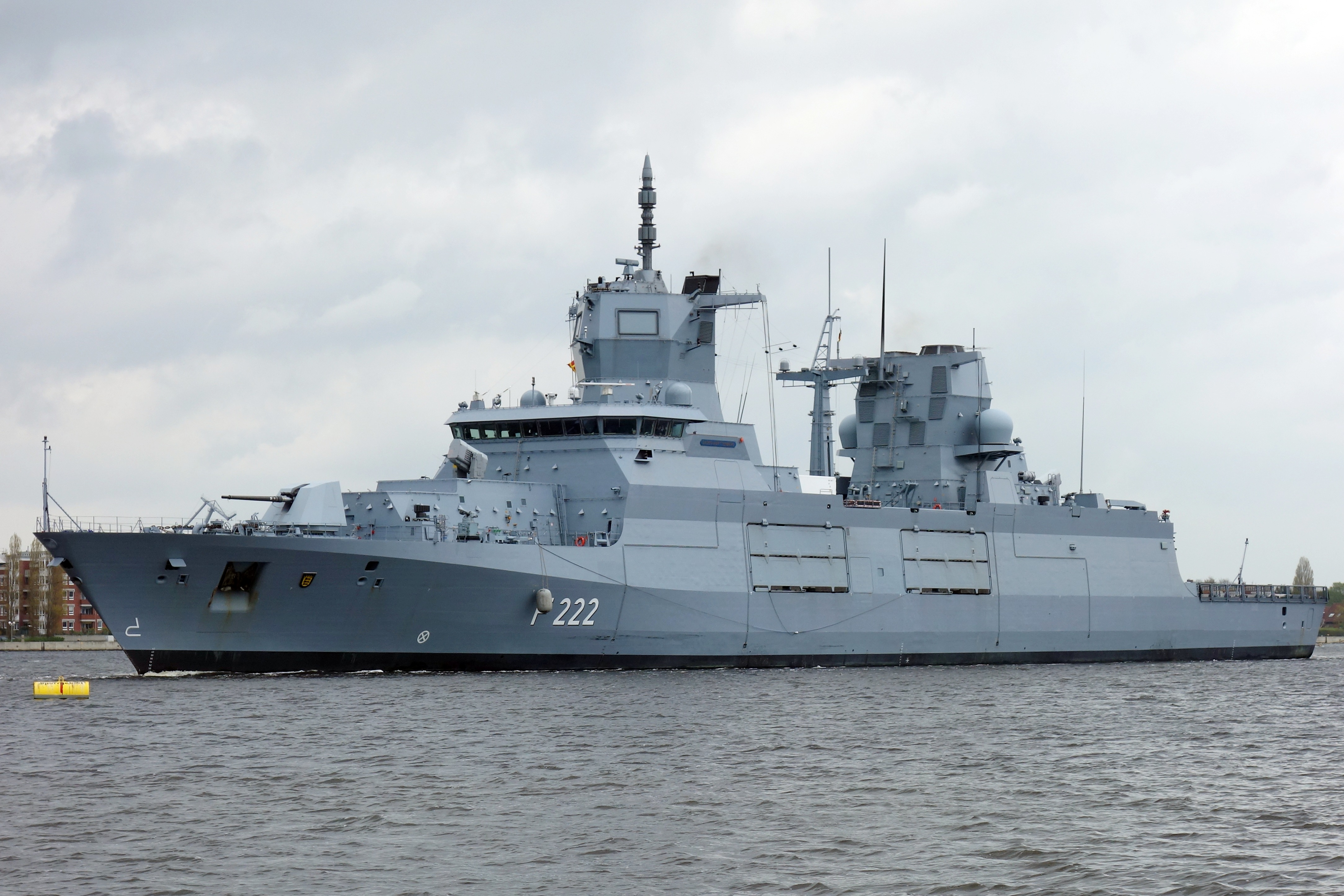
Baden-Württemberg at the deperming range in Wilhelmshaven

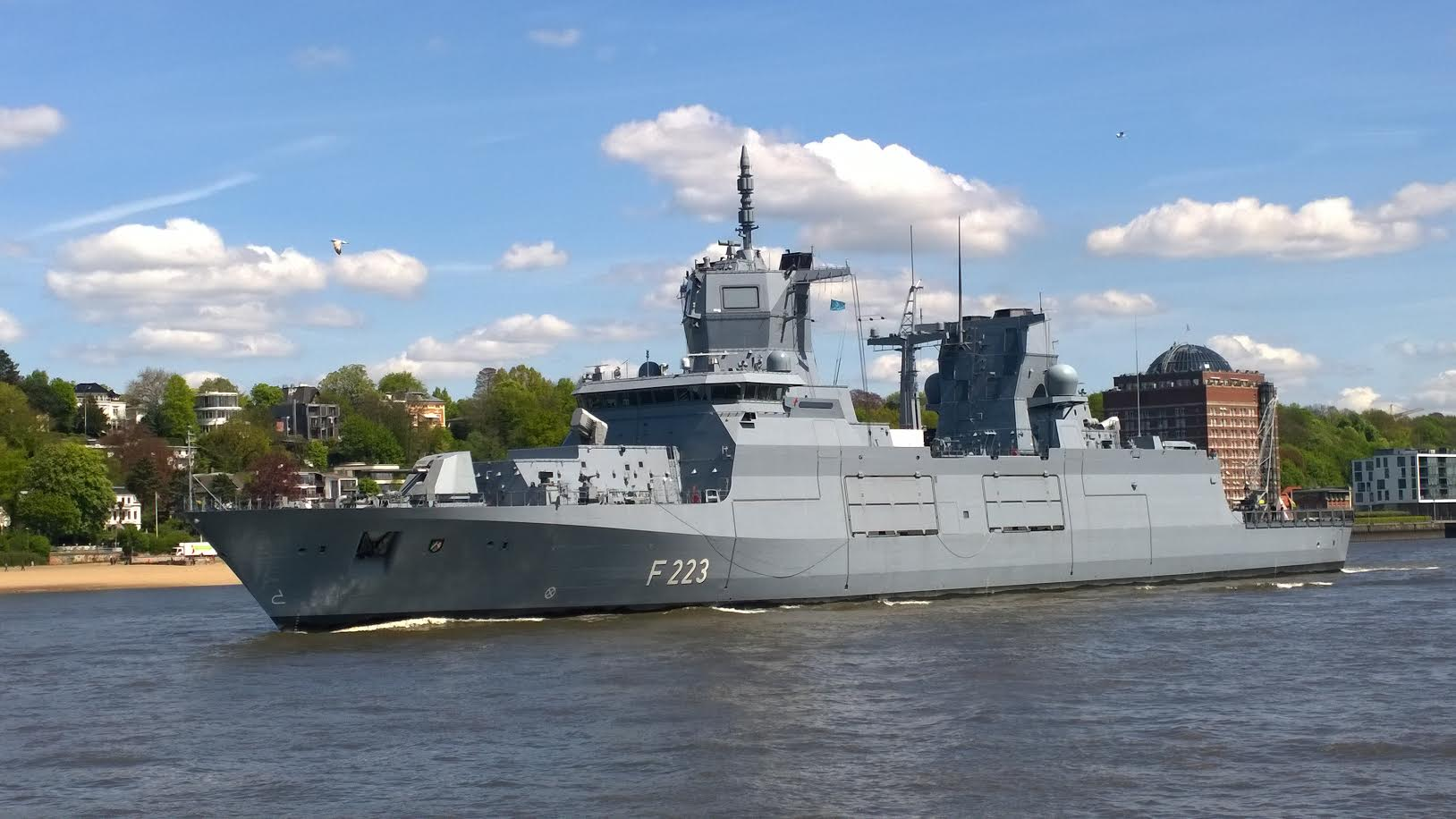
Nordrhein-Westfalen underway in May 2017

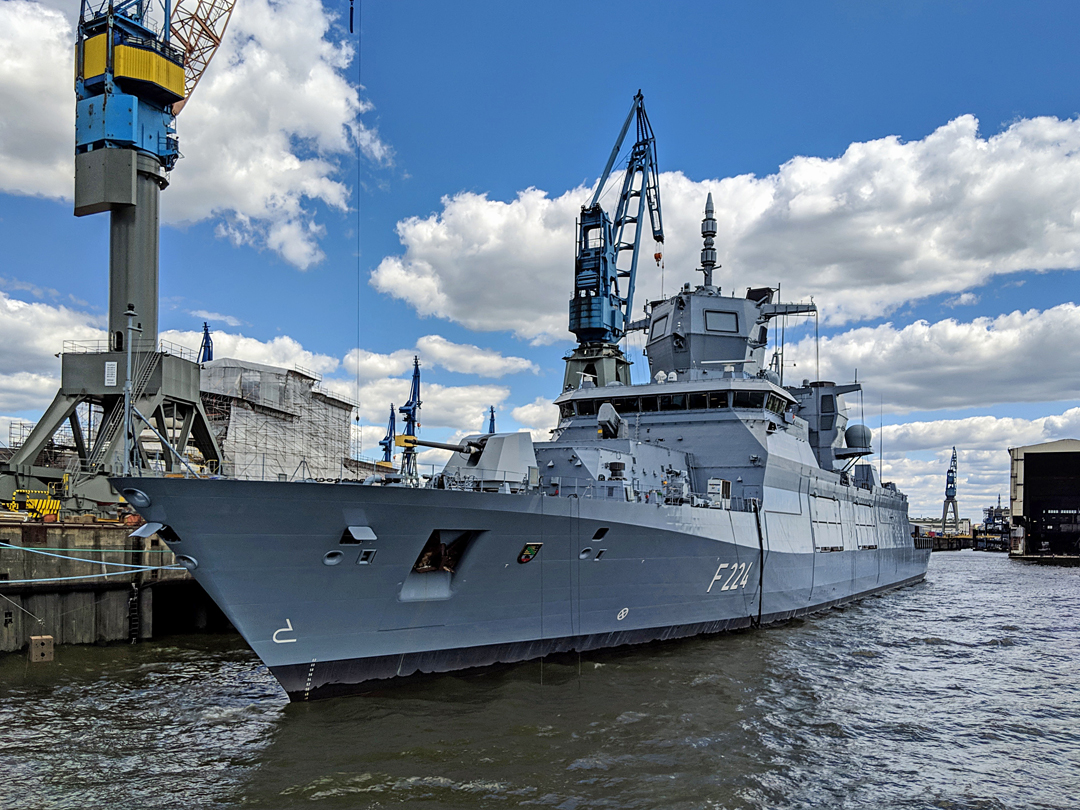
Sachsen-Anhalt in June 2018

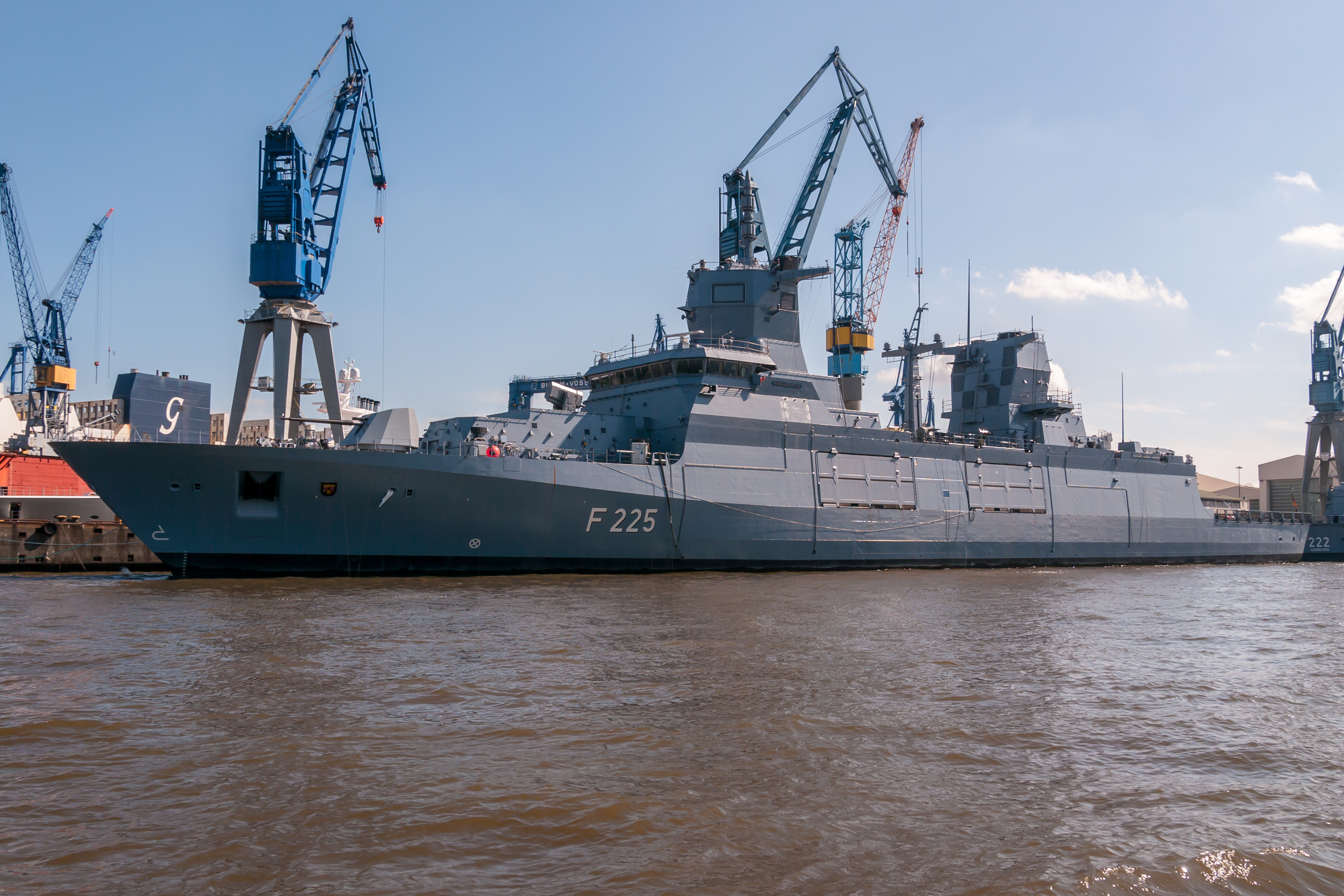
Rheinland-Pfalz in the port of Hamburg in 2019

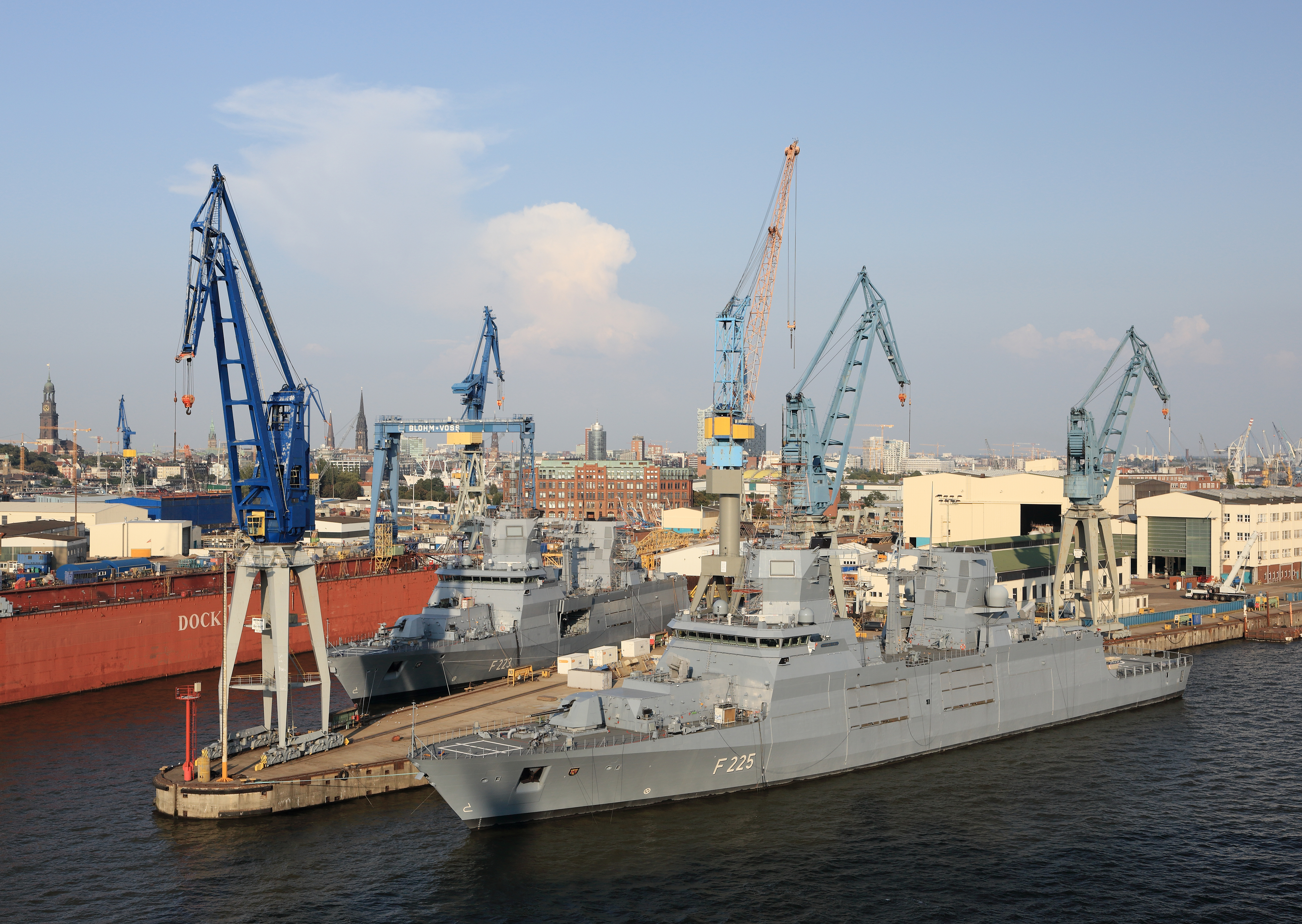
Nordrhein-Westfalen and Rheinland-Pfalz under construction in August 2019

== See also ==
- List of frigate classes in service

Equivalent frigates

- FF(X) (United States)
- La Fayette-class frigate (France)
- Type 053H3 frigate (China)
