= German frigate Rheinland-Pfalz (F225) =

Baden-Württemberg-class frigates

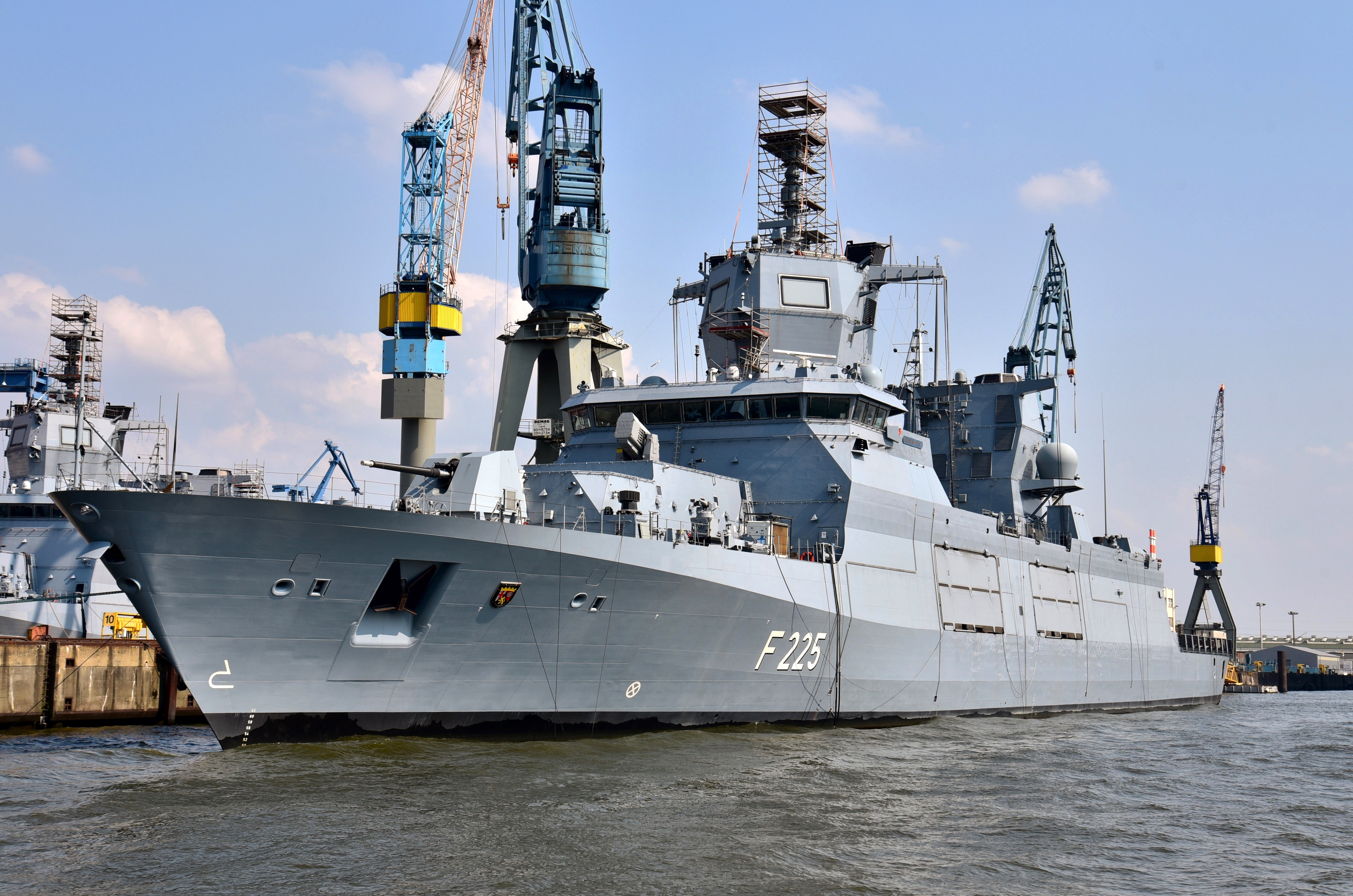
- Rheinland-Pfalz at the port of Hamburg in 2019.

History

Germany
- Name: Rheinland-Pfalz
- Namesake: Rheinland-Pfalz
- Port of registry: Hamburg, Germany
- Builder: Lürssen, Wolgast Blohm+Voss, Hamburg
- Laid down: 29 January 2015
- Launched: 24 May 2017
- Acquired: 28 January 2022
- Commissioned: 13 July 2022
- Identification: MMSI number: 211923000; Callsign: DRAG; Pennant number: F225
- Status: In active service

General characteristics
- Class & type: Baden-Württemberg-class frigate
- Displacement: 7,200 tonnes
- Length: 149.52 m (490 ft 7 in)
- Beam: 18.80 m (61 ft 8 in)
- Draught: 5 m (16 ft 5 in)
- Propulsion: CODLAG; 1 × 20 MW gas turbine; 2 × 4.7 MW electric motors; 4 × 2.9 MW diesel generators; 3 × gearboxes: one for each shaft and one to crossconnect the gas turbine to them; 2 × shafts, driving controllable pitch propellers; 1 × 1 MW bow thruster
- Speed: 20 knots (37 km/h) on diesel only, 26 kn (48 km/h) max.
- Range: 4,000 nautical miles (7,400 km)
- Boats & landing craft carried: Submarine ROVs; 4 × 11 m (36 ft 1 in) RHIB, capable of more than 40 kn (74 km/h)
- Capacity: Space for two 6.1 m (20 ft 0 in) containers
- Complement: 190 (standard crew: 110)
- Sensors & processing systems: 1 × Cassidian TRS-4D AESA radar; 2(?) × navigation radars; IFF; diver and swimmer detection sonar (no anti-submarine sonar); Laser warning; KORA-18 Combined RADAR and COMMS ESM from GEDIS; Link 11, Link 16, Link 22 communications systems
- Electronic warfare & decoys: TKWA/MASS (Multi Ammunition Softkill System); ECM
- Armament: Naval guns: 1 × 127 mm lightweight Otobreda naval gun with guided VULCANO ammunition for land-attack missions (range: more than 100 km (62 mi)); 2 × 27 mm MLG 27 remote-controlled autocannons; 5 × 12.7 mm Hitrole-NT remote-controlled machine gun turrets; 2 × 12.7 mm heavy machine guns (manually controlled); Anti-air missiles: 2 × RAM Block II surface-to-air missile launcher/CIWS, 21 cells each; Anti-ship missiles: 8 × RGM-84 Harpoon anti-ship missiles (interim solution until joint sea/land attack missile RBS 15 MK4 becomes available); Non-Lethal: Water cannons
- Aircraft carried: 2 × NH-90 helicopters

Rheinland-Pfalz (F225) is the fourth ship of the Baden-Württemberg-class frigates of the German Navy.

== Background ==
Rheinland-Pfalz was designed and constructed by ARGE F125, a joint-venture of Thyssen-Krupp and Lürssen. She is part of the Baden-Württemberg class have the highest displacement of any class of frigate worldwide and are used to replace the Bremen class.

== Construction and career ==
Rheinland-Pfalz was laid down on 29 January 2015 and launched on 24 May 2017 in Hamburg. She was delivered to the German Navy in January 2022 and commissioned into service on 13 July of that year.

== Gallery ==
Rheinland-Pfalz gallery

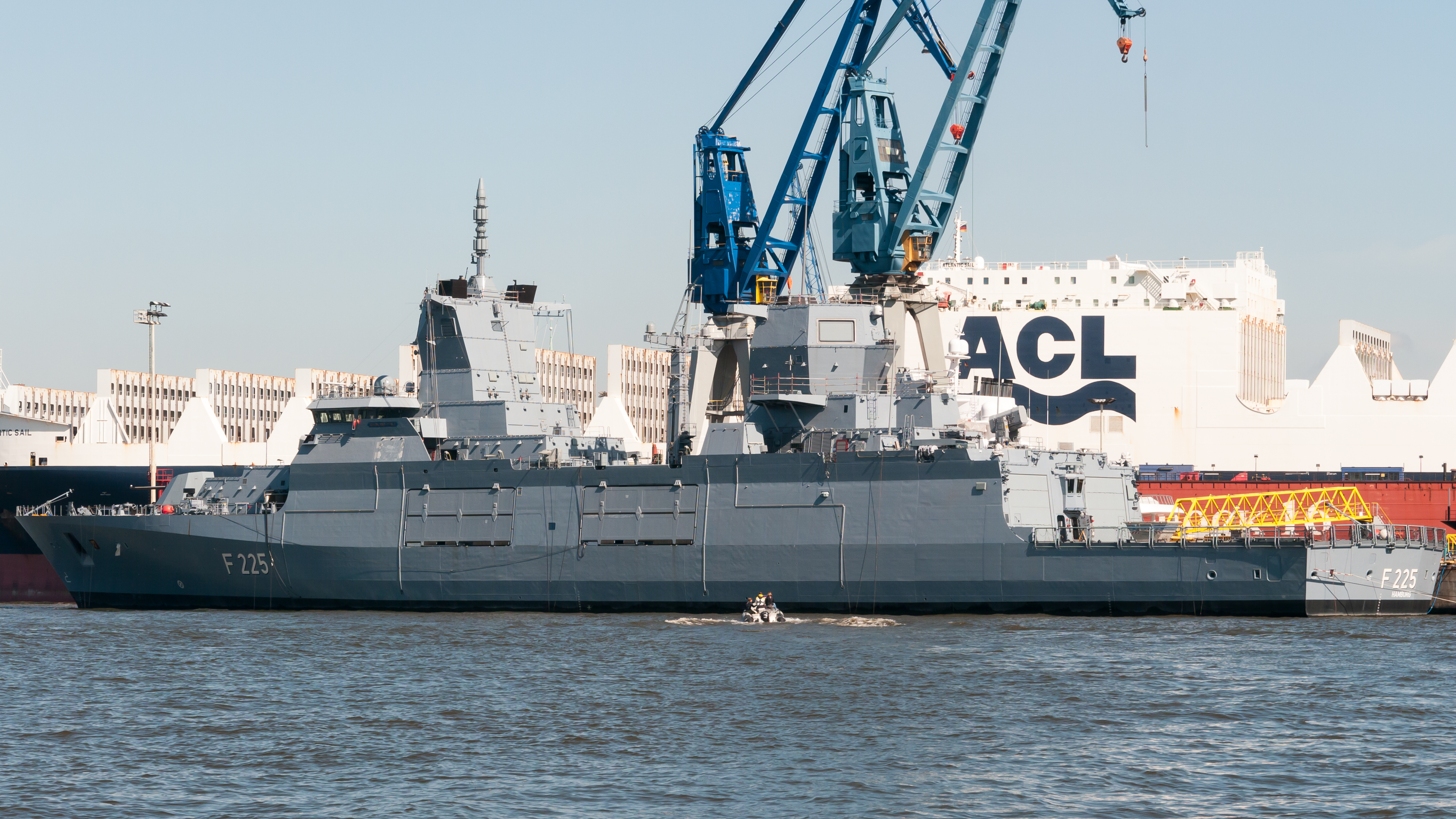
Rheinland-Pfalz at the port of Hamburg on 27 April 2019.

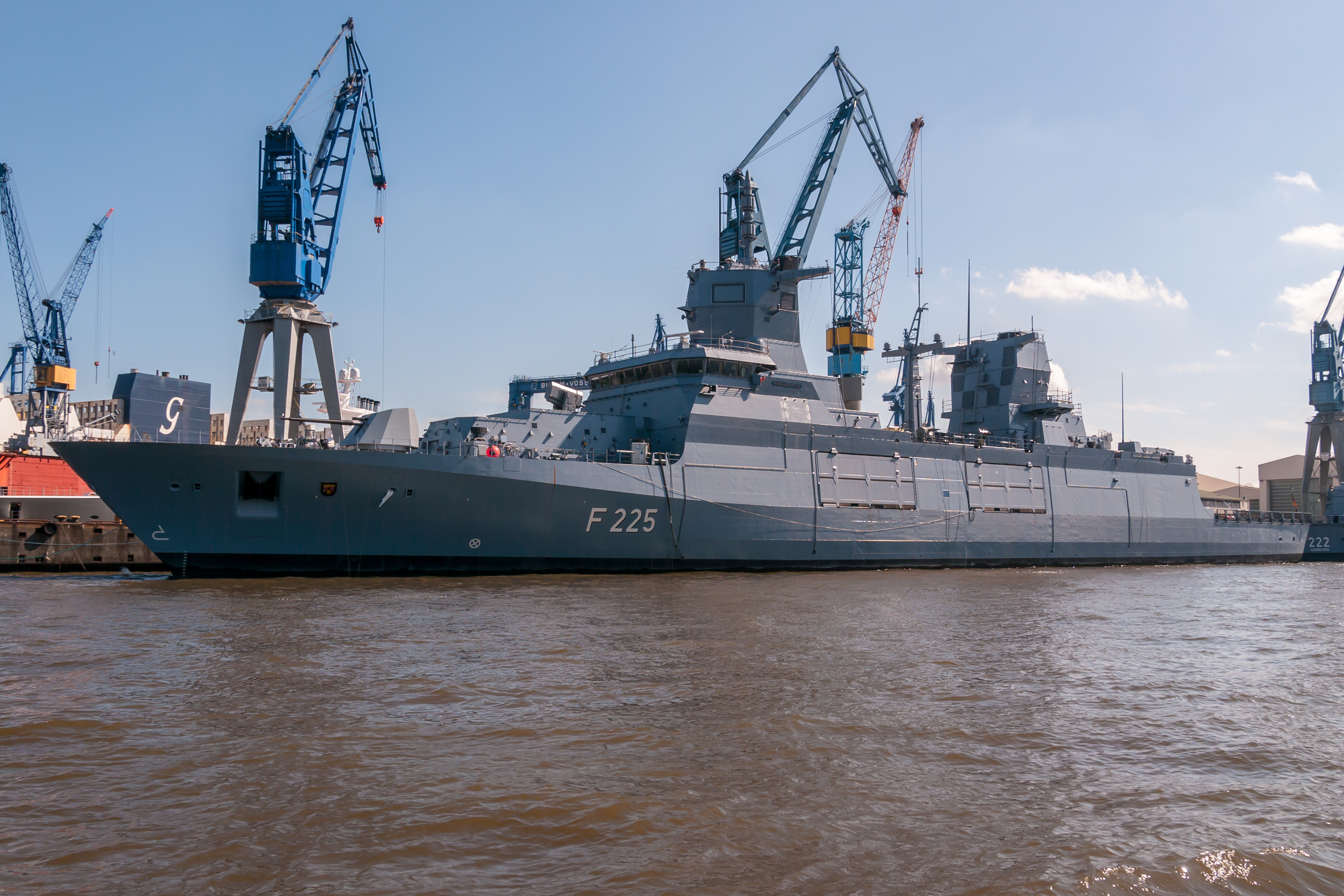
Rheinland-Pfalz at the port of Hamburg on 27 April 2019.
