= INS Delhi =

The following ships of the Indian Navy have been named Delhi:

- INS Delhi (C74) was formerly the Leander-class cruiser HMS Achilles acquired in 1948 from the Royal Navy and scrapped in 1978
- INS Delhi (D61) a Delhi-class destroyer launched in 1995
