= Mauser BK-27 =

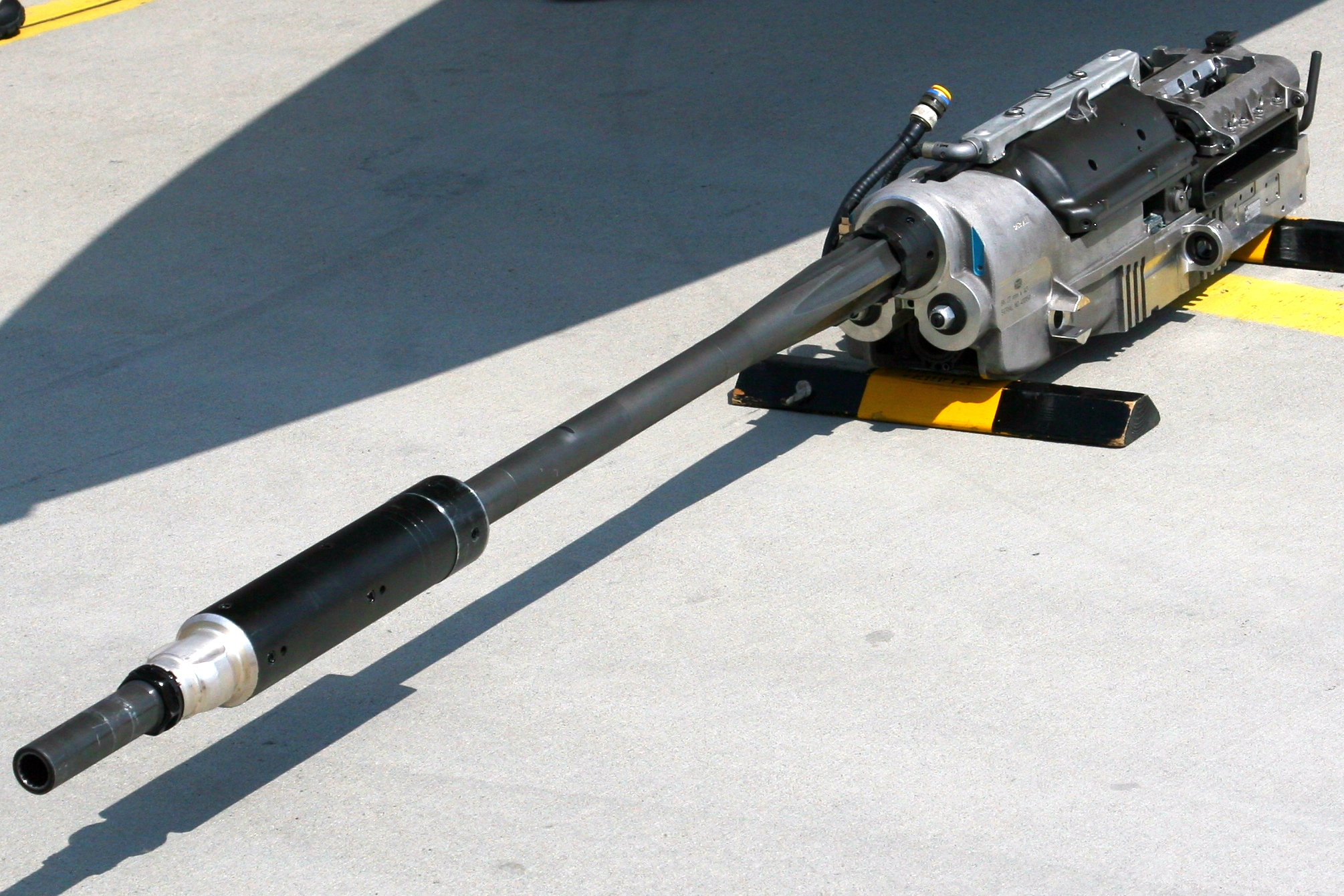
- The Mauser BK-27
- Type: Revolver cannon
- Place of origin: Germany

Service history
- Used by: See operators

Production history
- Designer: Mauser (now Rheinmetall)
- Designed: 1976
- Manufacturer: Mauser (now Rheinmetall)
- Produced: 1977–present
- No. built: 3,100~

Specifications
- Mass: 100 kg (220 lb 7 oz)
- Length: 2.31 m (7 ft 7 in)
- Barrel length: 1.73 m (5 ft 8 in)
- Shell: 27×145 mm
- Caliber: 27 mm (1.063 in) caliber
- Barrels: Single barrel
- Action: five-chamber revolver
- Rate of fire: 1,000–1,700 rpm (+/− 100 rpm), selectable
- Muzzle velocity: 1,100 m/s (3,600 ft/s)
- Maximum firing range: Air targets: 2,500 meters Surface targets: 4,000 meters High speed naval targets: 2,500 meters

The BK 27 (also BK27 or BK-27) (German abbreviation for Bordkanone, "on-board cannon") is a 27 mm (1.063 in) caliber revolver cannon manufactured by Mauser (now part of Rheinmetall) of Germany. It was developed in the late 1960s for the MRCA (Multi Role Combat Aircraft) program that ultimately became the Panavia Tornado.

The BK 27 is a gas-operated cannon firing a series of 27×145 mm cartridges with a typical projectile weight of 260 g (9.2 oz), and a total weight for the complete round of 516 g (1.14 lb). Most models use a linked feed system for the ammunition; however, the Eurofighter Typhoon makes use of a specially developed variant of the BK 27 that uses a linkless feed system instead, which is intended to improve reliability.

== Design ==
The Mauser BK 27 is used in the Panavia Tornado, the Alpha Jet, the JAS 39 Gripen, and the Eurofighter Typhoon. At one time Lockheed Martin was considering a licensed-built version for the F-35 Lightning II.

Rheinmetall has also developed remote-controlled naval versions, the MN 27 GS and the MLG 27 fully automatic naval guns, which are installed on many ships of the German Navy. Ninety-nine MLG 27s have been ordered by the German Navy so far. The cannon is a single-barrel, high-performance, breech-cylinder gun operated by a fully automatic, electrically fired, gas-operated system at a selective rate of 1000 or 1700 rounds per minute(+/− 100 rpm). The Mauser BK 27 utilizes pyrotechnic cocking charges to cycle the action.

The gun mainly fires mine shells as these have the best effect against aircraft. There are also several types of armor piercing shells like the frangible armour piercing shell named Fap 27 mm x 145 mm ammunition/peb327 (DM103).

=== Operational history ===
In his book Typhoon, former RAF pilot Mike Sutton reported his 27 mm cannon jamming during a strafing run in Syria while supporting Allied ground units against ISIS targets. According to his book, the Typhoon was to be built, originally, without an internal gun, like the F-4 Phantom and the Harrier. However, while a decision was made to install an internal gun, this led to "manufacturing issues". Sutton claimed that during his strafing run the gun jammed after "twenty-six rounds", the HUD showing "GUN FAIL". During the debrief this problem was well known to both the pilots and ground crews. One pilot told Sutton: "They said that issue had been fixed", to which Sutton replied "Exactly. We've been here before."

== Operators ==
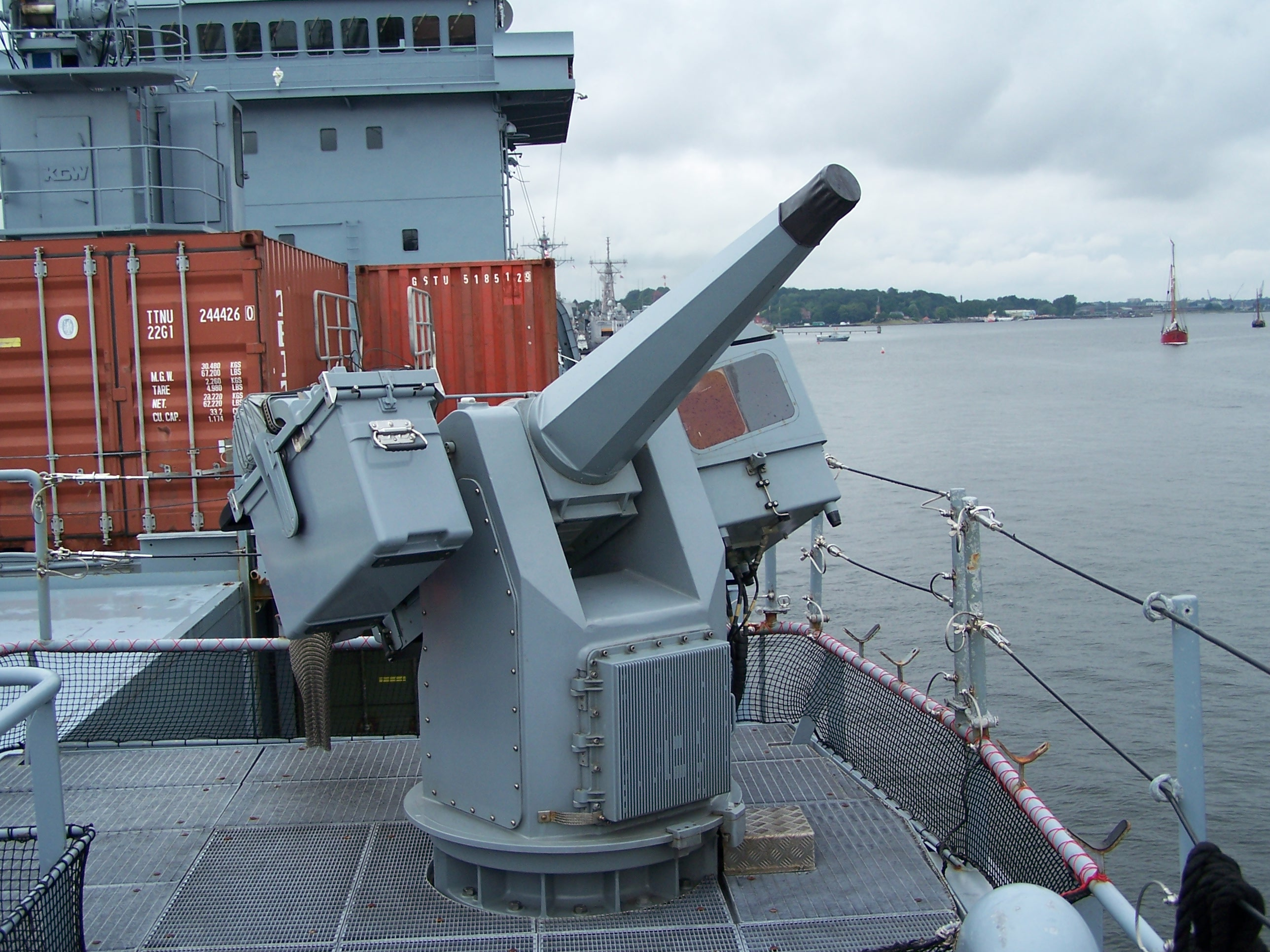
MLG 27 mounted on board an Elbe-class replenishment ship of the German Navy

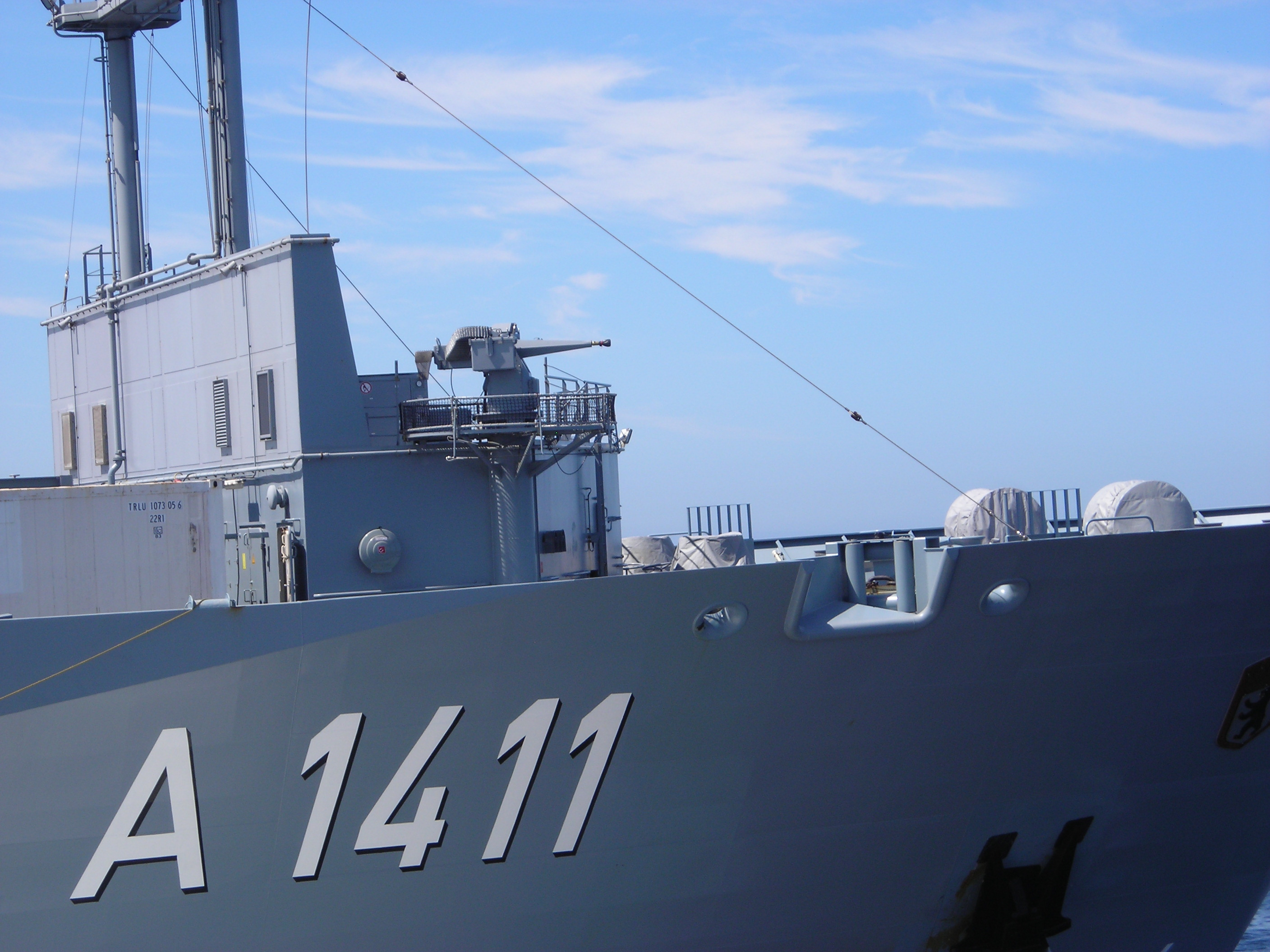
MLG 27 on board a Berlin-class replenishment ship of the German Navy

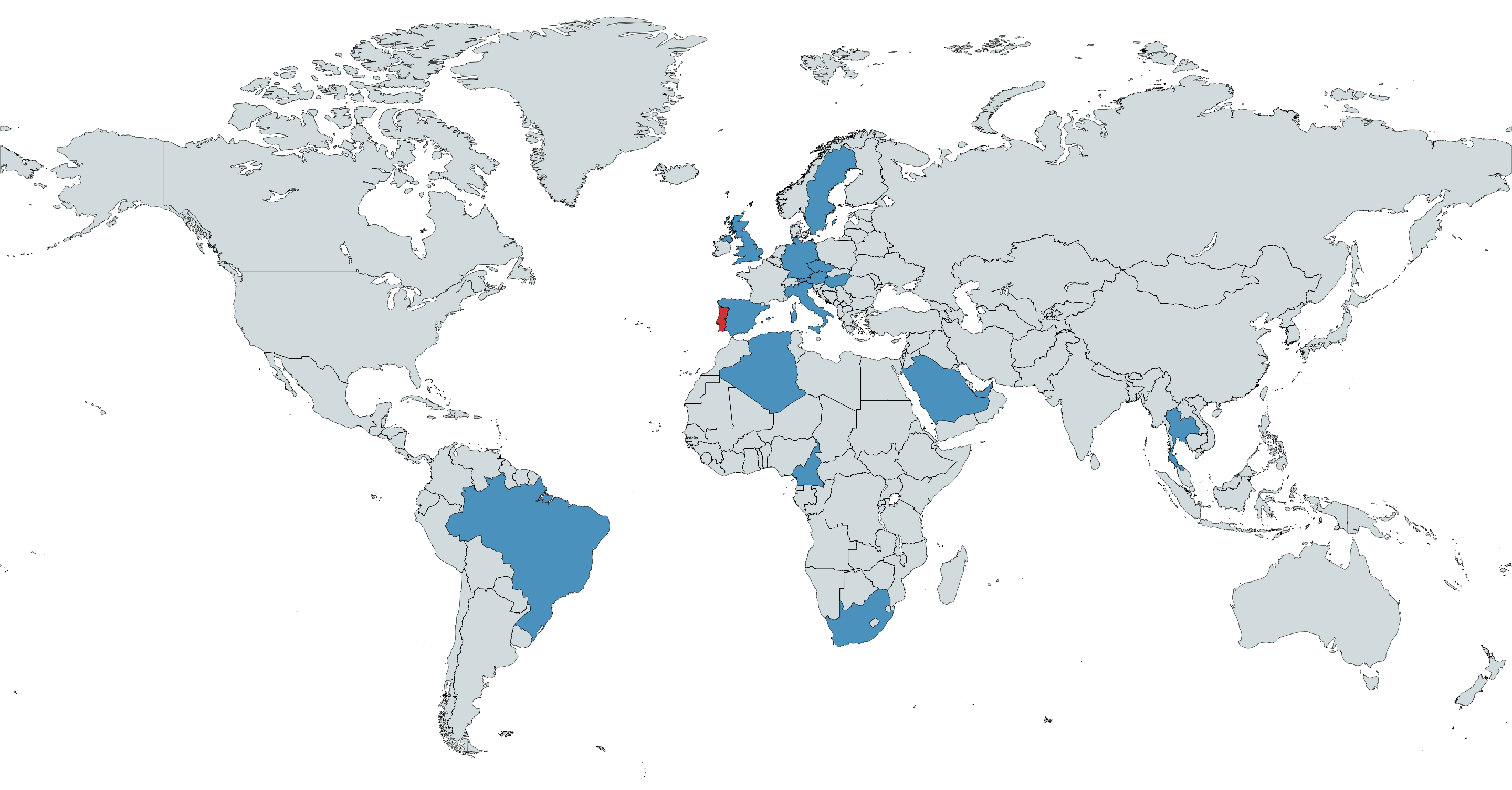
Map with operators of the BK-27 in blue and former operators in red

=== Current operators ===
Algeria
Algerian Navy
Austria
Austrian Air Force:
Brazil
Brazilian Air Force:
- Saab JAS 39 Gripen E/F
Brunei
Royal Brunei Navy
- 4 × Darussalam class with 1 × MLG27 each
- 4 × Ijtihad class with 1 × MLG27 each
Canada
Discovery Air Defence Services:
- Alpha Jet A (former Luftwaffe and QinetiQ Aircraft)
Czech Republic
Czech Air Force:
- Saab JAS 39 Gripen C/D
Germany
German Air force:
- Eurofighter Tranche 1
- Eurofighter Tranche 2
- Eurofighter Tranche 3
- Eurofighter Tranche 4
- Eurofighter ECR
- Panavia Tornado IDS
- Panavia Tornado ECR
German Navy:
- 4 × Brandenburg class (F123) with 2 × MLG27 each
- 3 × Sachsen class (F124) with 2 × MLG27 each
- 4 × Baden-Württemberg class (F125) with 2 × MLG27 each
- 10 × Braunschweig class (K130) with 2 × MLG27 each
- 2 × Ensdorf class (Type 352) to be upgraded with 2 × MLG27 each
- 8 × Frankenthal class (Type 322) to be upgraded with 1 × MLG27 each
- 3 × Berlin class with 4 × MLG27 each
- 2 × Elbe class (Type 404) to be upgraded with 2 × MLG27 each
Hungary
Hungarian Air Force:
- Saab JAS 39 Gripen C/D
Italy
Italian Air force:
- Eurofighter Tranche 1
- Eurofighter Tranche 2
- Eurofighter Tranche 3
- Eurofighter Tranche 4
- Panavia Tornado IDS
- Panavia Tornado ECR
Oman
Royal Air Force of Oman:
- Eurofighter Tranche 3
Qatar
Qatar Emiri Air Force:
- Eurofighter Tranche 3
Saudi Arabia
Royal Saudi Air Force:
- Eurofighter Tranche 2
- Eurofighter Tranche 3
- Panavia Tornado IDS
South Africa
South African Air Force:
- Saab JAS 39 Gripen C/D
Spain
Spanish Air Force:
- Eurofighter Tranche 1
- Eurofighter Tranche 2
- Eurofighter Tranche 3
- Eurofighter Tranche 4
Sweden
Swedish Air Force (under the designation 27 mm akan m/85 / 27 mm automatkanon m/85)
- Saab JAS 39 Gripen C/D and E/F
Thailand
Royal Thai Air Force:
- Alpha Jet A (former Luftwaffe aircraft)
- Saab JAS 39 Gripen C/D
United Arab Emirates
United Arab Emirates Navy:
- 6 × Baynunah class with 2 × MLG27 each
United Kingdom
Royal Air Force:
- Eurofighter Tranche 1
- Eurofighter Tranche 2
- Eurofighter Tranche 3

=== Systems retired ===
Australia
Royal Australian Air Force:
- Alpha Jet A (former Luftwaffe aircraft, retired)
Germany
German Air Force:
- Alpha Jet A (retired and sold second-hand)
Marineflieger:
- Panavia Tornado IDS (retired and transferred to Luftwaffe)
German Navy:
- 8 × Bremen class (F122) with 2 × MLG27 each
Portugal
Portuguese Air Force:
- Alpha Jet A (former Luftwaffe aircraft, retired in January 2018)
Saudi Arabia
Royal Saudi Air Force:
- Panavia Tornado ADV (retired in 2006)
Sweden
Swedish Air Force:
- Saab JAS 39 Gripen A/B
United Kingdom
Royal Air Force:
- Panavia Tornado IDS
- Panavia Tornado ADV
QinetiQ:
- Alpha Jet A (former Luftwaffe aircraft, retired in January 2018)

== Specifications ==
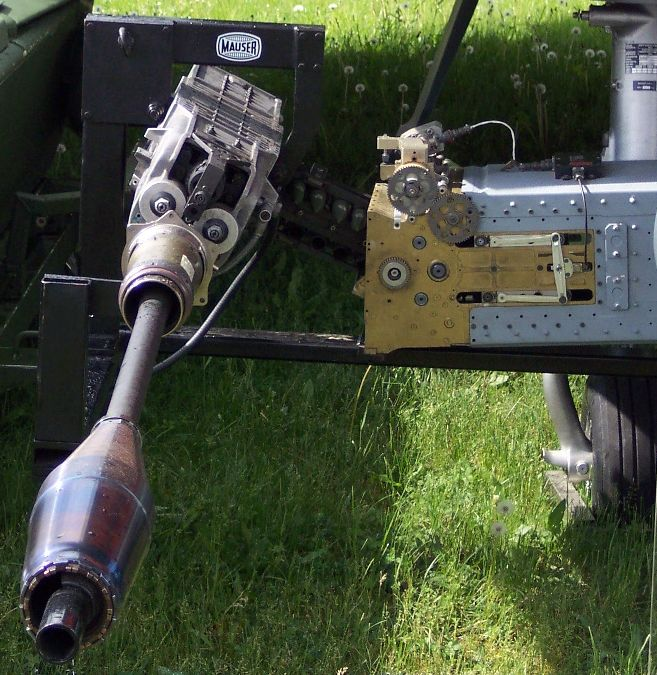
Helicopter-mounted Mauser BK-27

Data from Jane's Information Group

- Type: single-barrel, five chamber revolver cannon
- Caliber: 27 mm × 145 (1.063 in)
- Operation: revolver
- Length: 2.31 m (7 ft 7 in)
- Weight (complete): 100 kg (220 lb)
- Rate of fire: 1,000-1,700 rpm selectable (+/− 100 rpm)
- Muzzle velocity: 1,100 m/s (3,600 ft/s)
- Muzzle energy: ≈157,300 Joules
- Projectile weight: 260 g (9.2 oz)

== See also ==
- Oerlikon KCA - comparable Swiss design: 30×173mm NATO
- GIAT 30 - comparable French design: 30×150mm and 30×113mm
- VENOM LR 30 mm – comparable British design, 21st century 113mm-long derivative of ADEN
- DEFA cannon - comparable older French design: 30×113mm
- ADEN cannon – comparable older British design: 30×111mm
- R-23 cannon – comparable Russian design: 23mm×260mm (telescoped)
- M39 cannon – comparable US design: 20×102mm
