= Wiesel (weapons carrier) =

German air-transportable armoured weapons carrier

Wiesel 1
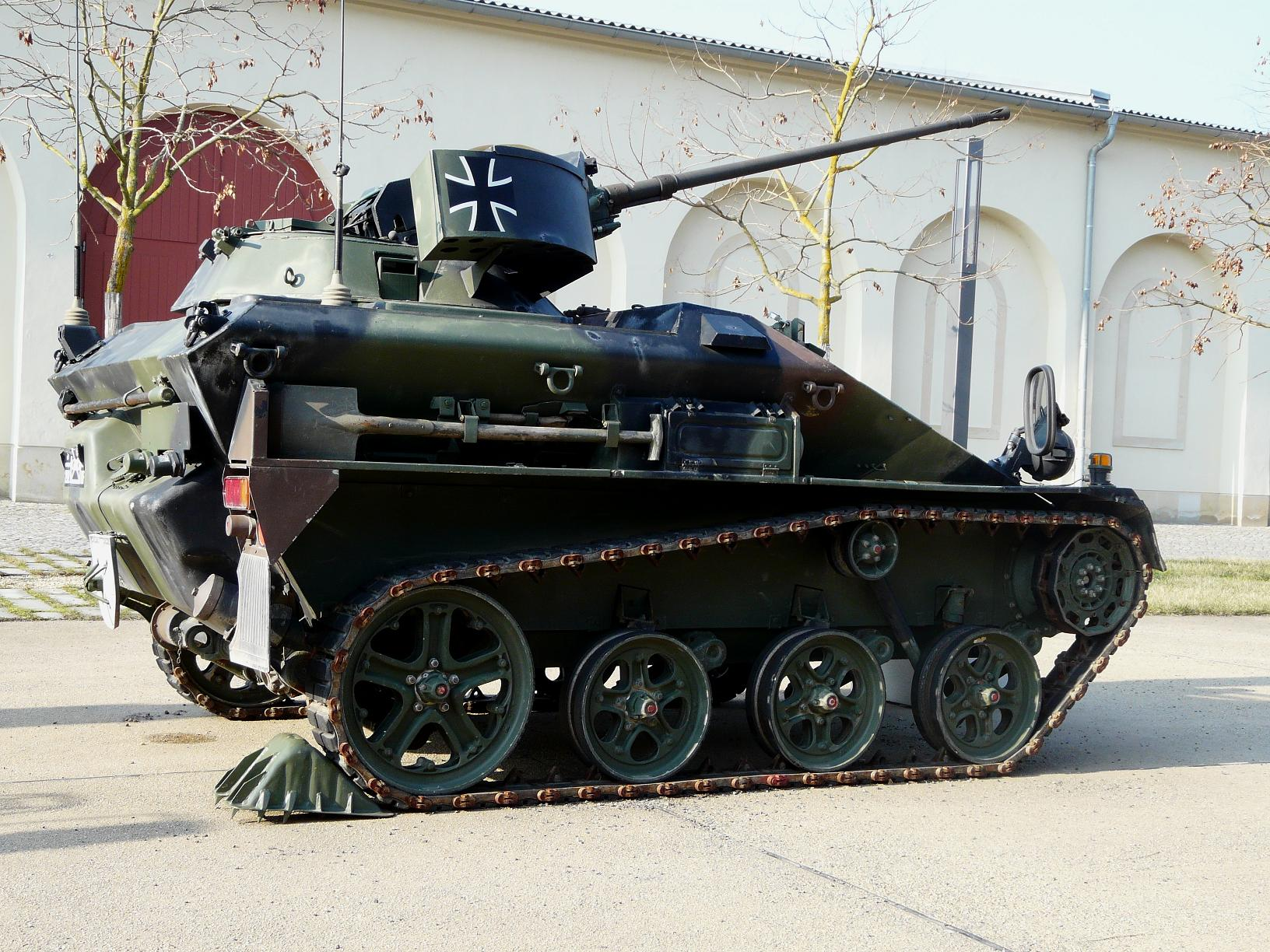
- A Wiesel 1
- Type: Tankette
- Place of origin: West Germany

Production history
- Manufacturer: Rheinmetall Landsysteme GmbH
- Produced: 1979–1993
- No. built: 343

Specifications
- Mass: 2.75 t to 4.78 t
- Length: 3.55 metres (11 ft 8 in)
- Width: 1.82 metres (6 ft 0 in)
- Height: 1.82 metres (6 ft 0 in)
- Crew: Driver, gunner/commander or driver, gunner and commander depending on variant.
- Engine: Audi 2.0 L 5-cylinder in-line turbo-diesel 64 kilowatts (86 hp)
- Suspension: torsion bar
- Operational range: 200 kilometres (120 mi)
- Maximum speed: 70 kilometres per hour (43 mph)

The Wiesel is a German light air-transportable armoured fighting vehicle or armoured weapons carrier (German: Waffenträger), produced by Rheinmetall.

The Wiesel has been used in several of the Bundeswehr's missions abroad (UNOSOM II, IFOR, SFOR, KFOR, TFH, ISAF).

== History ==
The Wiesel was developed for the West German army to meet a requirement for an air-transportable light armored vehicle for use by its airborne troops, as the infantry of the West German Bundeswehr, especially airborne infantry, were considered unprepared to successfully fight enemy main battle tanks (MBT) in the 1970s. The requirements were that the vehicle should fit in common NATO transport planes and could eventually be air-dropped. It should be able to fight infantry as well as enemy tanks or aircraft. Porsche produced some prototypes of the future fighting vehicle for the Bundeswehr in 1975, but the Bundeswehr stopped the project in 1978 due to lack of funds. Nevertheless, Porsche continued development, because of interest from other countries.

The Bundeswehr eventually ordered 343 of the vehicles in 1985. The Wiesel was introduced as a new weapon system for the Bundeswehr with deliveries beginning in the late 1980s. The vehicle was named Wiesel ("weasel") because of its small size and agility, which make it very difficult to detect on the battlefield. Production of the Wiesel 1 ended in 1993. Of 343 Wiesel 1 vehicles, 210 were armed with Raytheon TOW wire-guided anti-tank guided missile system and 133 have the one-man KUKA turret E6-II-A1 armed with the dual-feed Rheinmetall Mk 20 RH-202 20 mm autocannon. Germany deployed both types to Somalia in 1993 as part of the United Nations forces intervention in the Somali Civil War (UNISOM II).

The Wiesel 2 is an enlarged and extended version of the Wiesel 1 with five road wheels instead of four, and a more powerful engine. The Bundeswehr ordered 178 of the new vehicle in various types, including air defense, radar, and anti-aircraft missile launcher, 120 mm mortar carrier, command and fire control, and ambulance variants. The Wiesel 2 entered service in 2001.

The Wiesel 1 MELLS and MK variants were used by German troops of Luftlandebrigade 1 in April 2023 to secure an airfield near Khartoum in support of the German government's evacuation of German citizens from Sudan during the Sudanese Civil War.

== Configuration ==
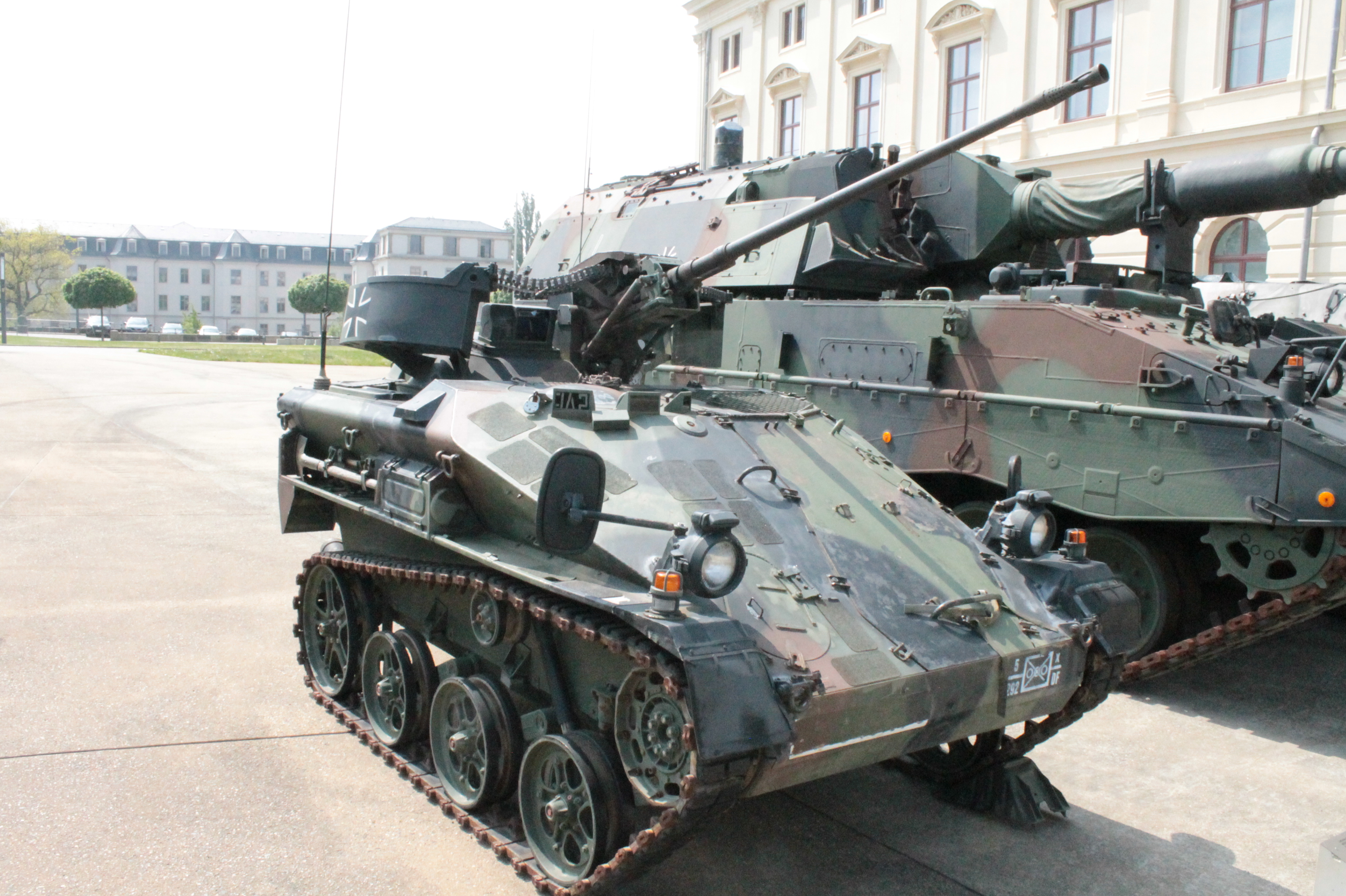
Wiesel 1 MK20 (1991) Bundeswehr Military History Museum, Dresden. The vehicle next to it is the Panzerhaubitze 2000.

Depending on the exact configuration, the Wiesel 1's length is about 3.55 metres (11.6 ft), height 1.82 metres (6.0 ft), and width 1.82 metres (6.0 ft). At only 2.75 metric tons (3.03 short tons), it weighs less than the armored variant of the U.S. Humvee military light truck. The engine is a 64 kW (86 hp) Audi 2.1-litre diesel engine giving a top speed of 70 km/h (45 mph). The Wiesel can ford 0.5 metres (1.6 ft) deep water and cross a 1.2 metres (3.9 ft) wide trench. It was manufactured by Rheinmetall AG.

The chassis is made of steel armour and can resist common 5.56 mm and 7.62 mm small arms ammunition and shell splinters. Air dropping the vehicle from a plane with parachutes was tested, but was not successful; four test-vehicles were destroyed. Nevertheless, the Wiesel can easily be flown in by transport helicopters, a single CH-53 Sea Stallion helicopter can fly in two at once, and common transport planes can carry four or more Wiesel vehicles.

The larger Wiesel 2 has almost twice as much internal volume as its predecessor, and is about 4.78 metres (15.7 ft) long, 2.17 metres (7.1 ft) high (depending on type), and 1.87 metres (6.1 ft) wide. Its weight is approximately 4.78 metric tons (5.27 short tons) in its heaviest configuration.

== Wiesel 1 ==
=== Variants in service ===
- Wiesel 1 Aufklärung: reconnaissance
- Wiesel 1 ATM TOW: anti-tank vehicle fitted with TOW missiles
  - Wiesel 1 TOW: Updated with BMS
  - Wiesel 1 MELLS: TOW replaced by Spike
- Wiesel 1 MK20: fire support version with a Rheinmetall MK 20 Rh202 20mm autocannon
  - Wiesel 1 MK20 Variant 1: updated with new sight
  - Wiesel 1 MK20 Variant 2: updated with BMS
- Remotely controlled Wiesel 1 equipped with ground-scanning radar as part of the Route Clearance System

=== Prototypes and studies ===
- Wiesel 1 ATM TOW Resupply: cargo carrier fitted with racks for TOW missiles
- Wiesel 1 BTM-208: fitted with a SAMM BTM-208 turret armed with .50-cal (12.7mm) M2HB and 7.62mm Rheinmetall MG 3 machine guns
- Wiesel 1 ATM HOT: anti-tank vehicle fitted with HOT missiles
- Wiesel 1 ATM HOT Variant 1: fitted with UTM-800 turret
- Wiesel 1 Radar: fitted with RATAC-S multi-purpose radar
- Wiesel 1 MK25: 25 mm armed version

== Wiesel 2 ==
Wiesel 2
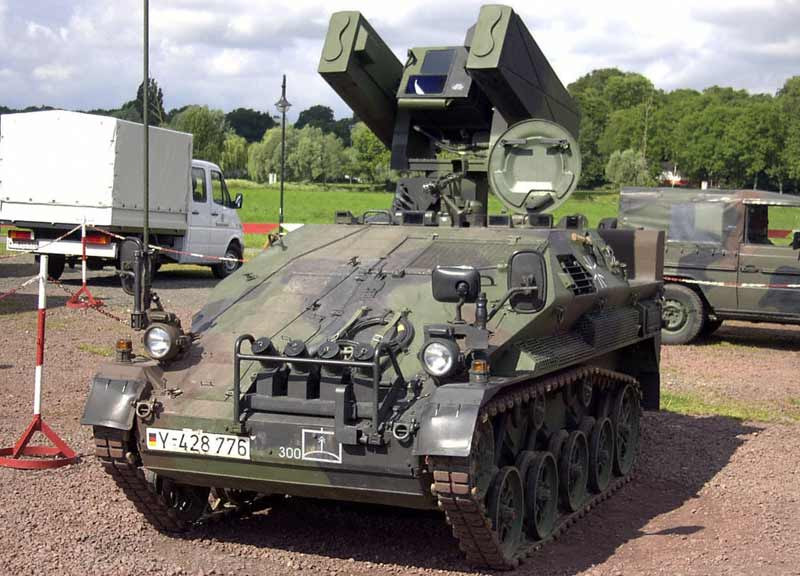
- Wiesel Ozelot Light Air Defence System (leichtes Flugabwehrsystem – LeFlaSys) Weapon Carrier
- Type: Tankette
- Place of origin: Germany

Production history
- Manufacturer: Rheinmetall Landsysteme GmbH
- No. built: 178

Specifications
- Mass: 2.75 t to 4.78 t
- Length: 4.78 metres (15 ft 8 in)
- Width: 1.87 metres (6 ft 2 in)
- Height: 2.17 metres (7 ft 1 in)
- Crew: 2 or 3
- Engine: Volkswagen 1.9 L Straight-4 turbo-diesel 81 kilowatts (109 hp)
- Suspension: torsion bar
- Operational range: 200 kilometres (120 mi)
- Maximum speed: 70 kilometres per hour (43 mph)

The Wiesel 2 is a stretched version of the Wiesel 1, with a fifth roadwheel. The engine was changed to a 1.9L Volkswagen in-line four-cylinder turbo diesel with direct injection and intercooler, giving 109 hp (81 kW) coupled to a ZF automatic transmission. The Wiesel 2 is generally bigger, faster and stronger than the Wiesel 1, with advanced features for the protection of the crew such as enhanced armour, an air conditioning system, and NBC protection.

=== Variants ===
- Wiesel 2 Light Air Defence System (leichtes Flugabwehrsystem – LeFlaSys)
  - Wiesel 2 Air Defence Command Post
  - Wiesel 2 Air Defence Reconnaissance and Fire Control Vehicle (RFCV): fitted with an air defence radar
  - Wiesel 2 Air Defence Weapon Carrier (Ozelot): fitted with air defence missile launchers (two box launchers containing four ready-to-fire FIM-92 Stingers, or, alternatively, a (currently unknown) number of vertical launch cells with LFK NG missiles)
- Wiesel 2 Ambulance
- Wiesel 2 Engineering Scout: combat engineer reconnaissance
- Wiesel 2 Command Post: battalion command post
- Wiesel 2 Advanced Mortar System
  - Wiesel 2 Company C2/ JFSCT: Command and control for combined and joint fire
  - Wiesel 2 Lightweight Armoured Mortar: 120 mm automatic laying weapon system
  - Wiesel 2 Joint Fire Support Team: Reconnaissance Vehicle

=== Prototypes and studies ===
- Wiesel 2 APC: 2 crew + 4 passengers armoured personnel carrier
- Wiesel 2 Argus: reconnaissance
- Wiesel 2 Carrier: ammunition resupply
- Wiesel 2 Primus: reconnaissance and fire control
- Wiesel 2 ATM HOT: anti-tank vehicle fitted with HOT missiles
- Wiesel 2 SYRANO: Robotic system for the French Army
- Wiesel 2 RMK 30: prototypes have been fitted with a Rheinmetall RMK30 recoilless autocannon

== Gallery ==
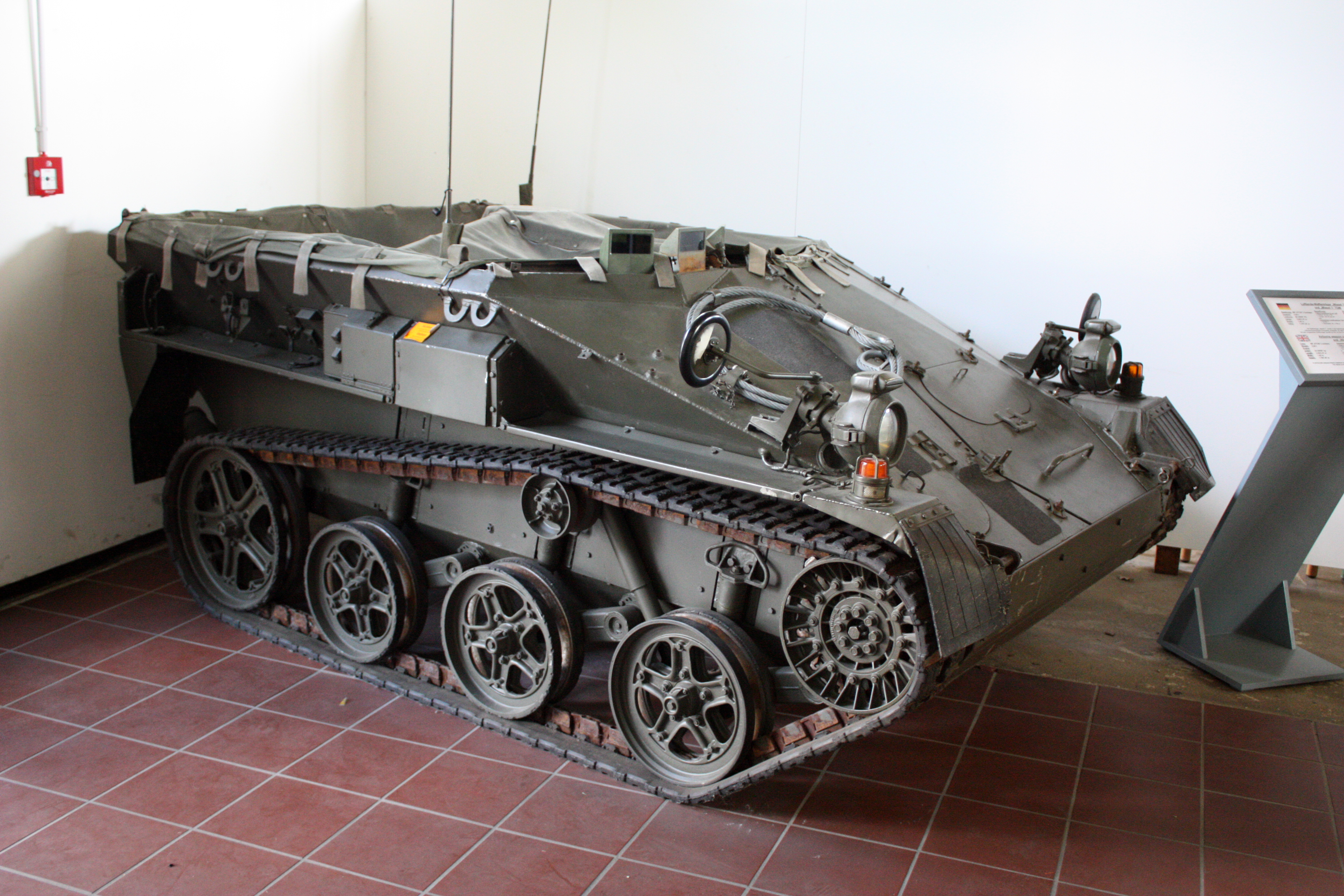
Wiesel 1 prototype

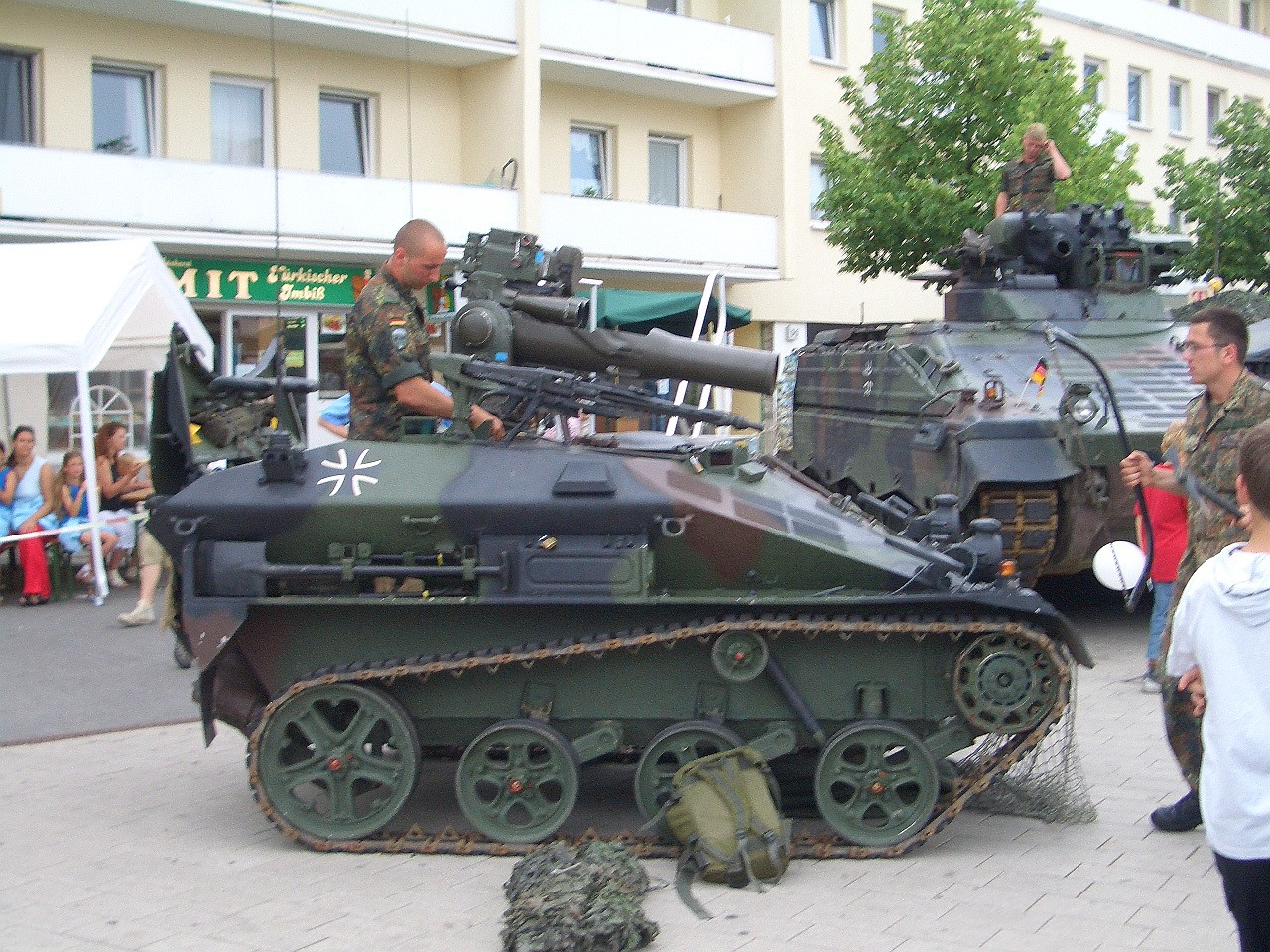
Wiesel 1 TOW

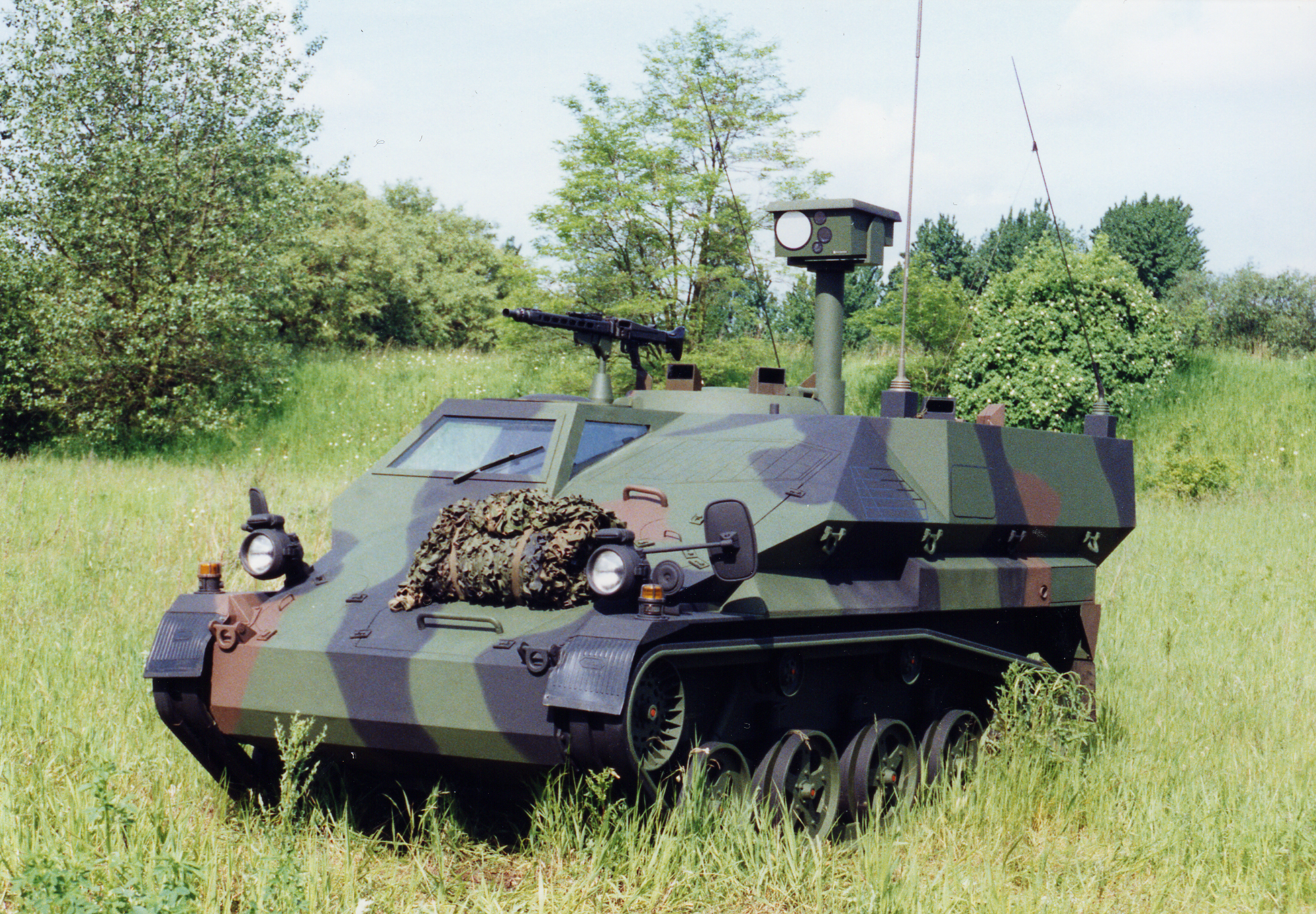
Wiesel 2 Argus scout vehicle

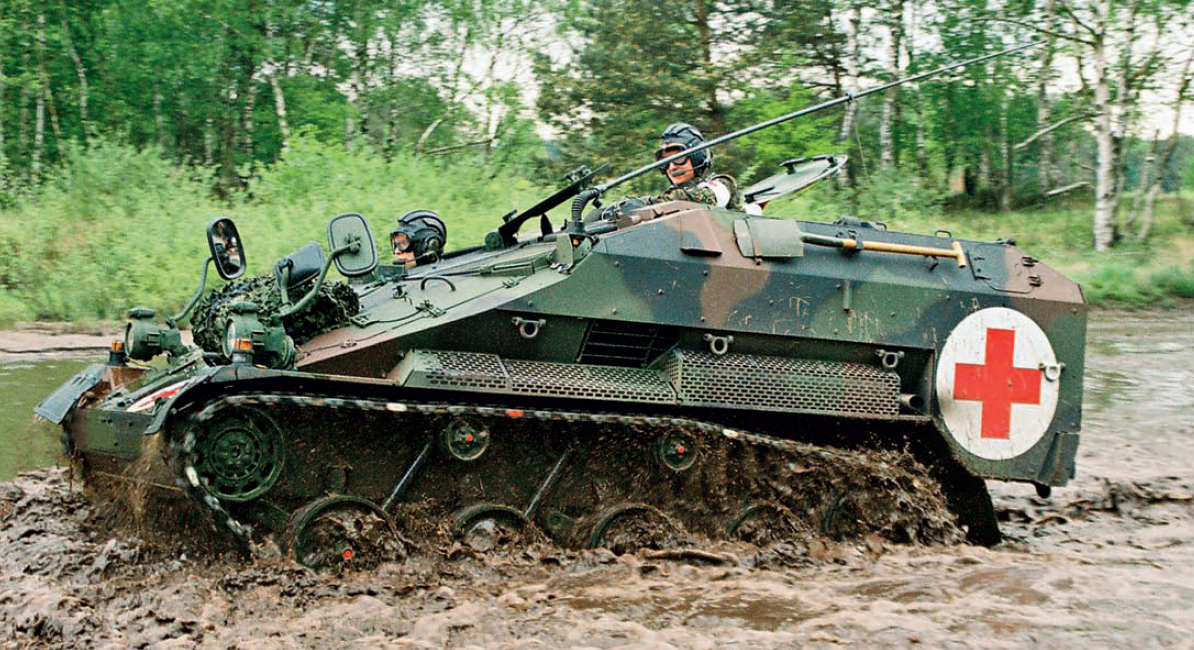
Wiesel 2 ambulance

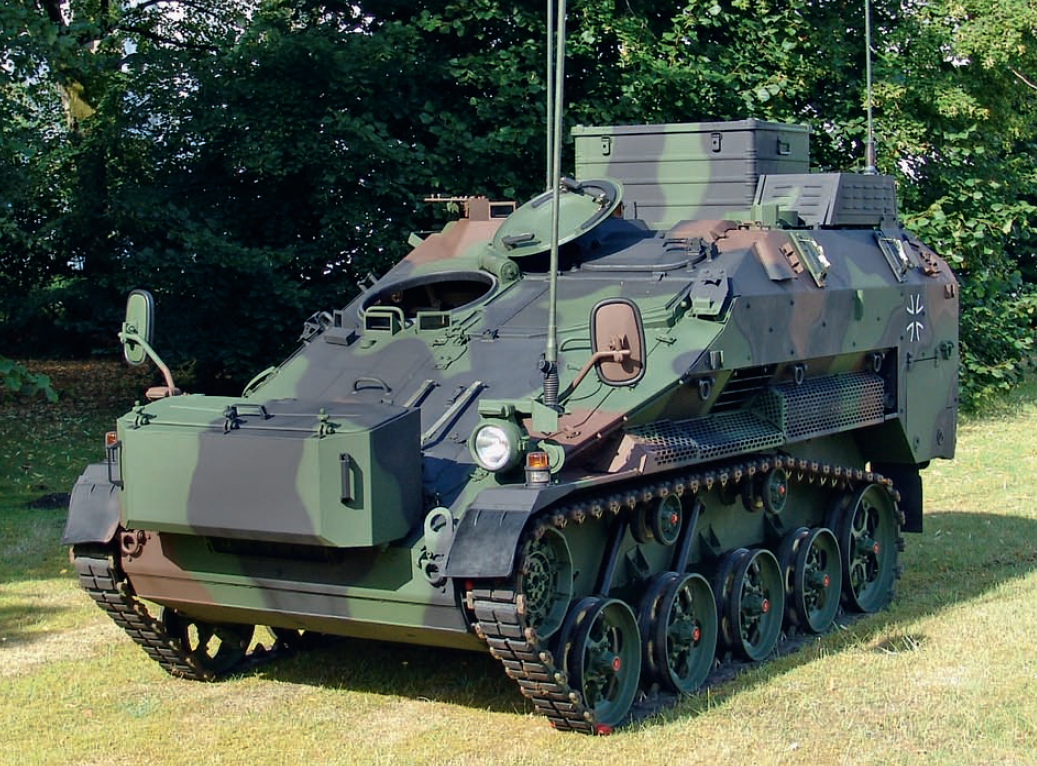
Wiesel 2 command post variant

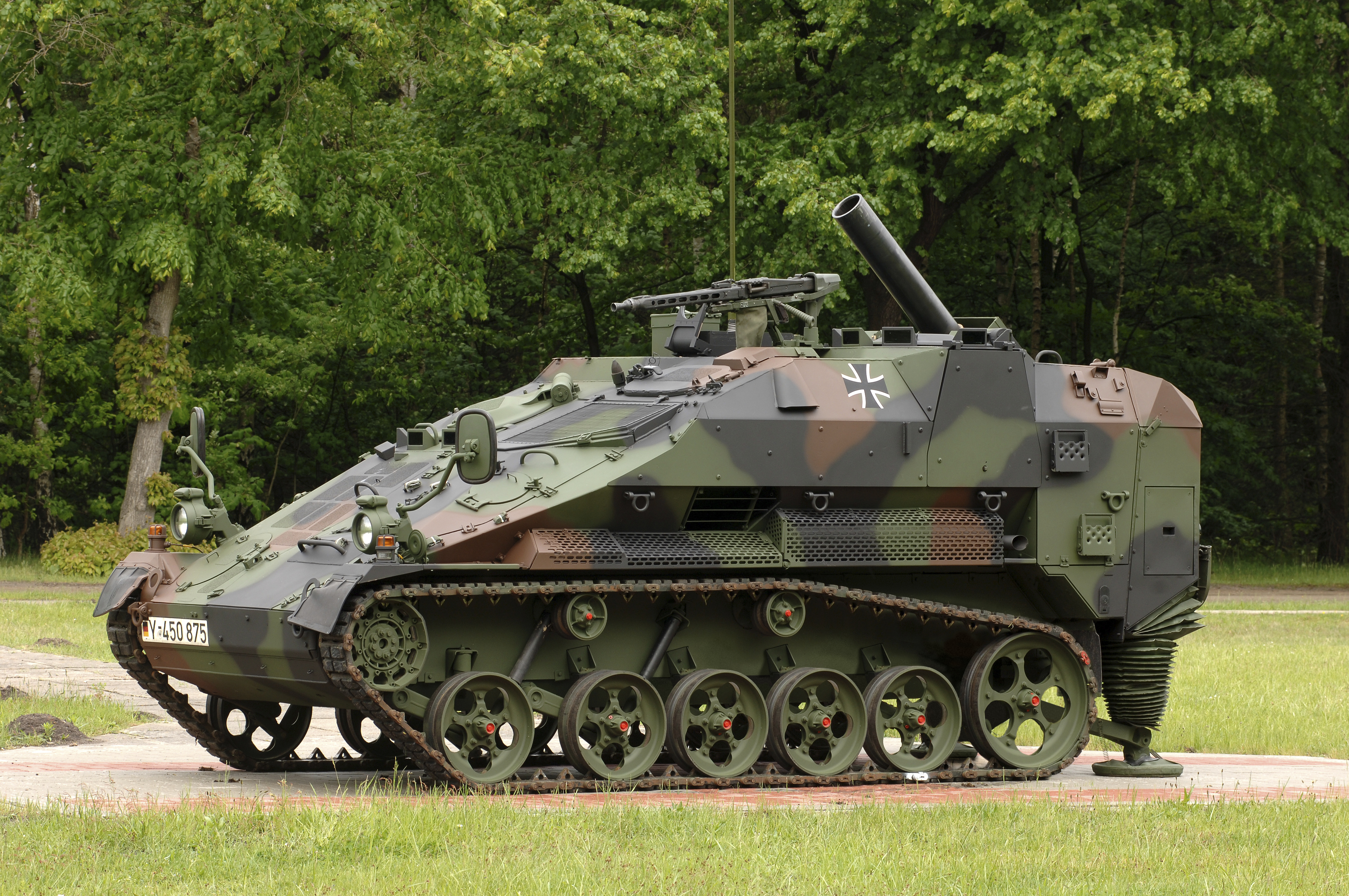
Wiesel 2 lightweight armoured mortar of the advanced mortar system

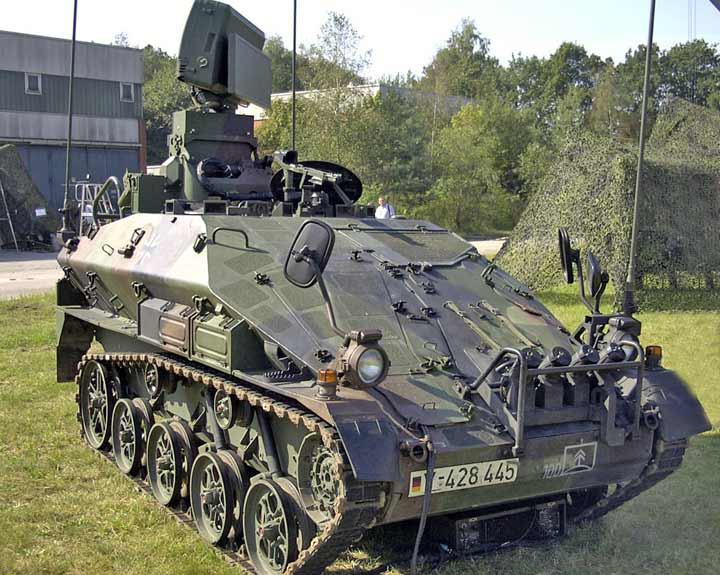
Wiesel 2 Light Air Defence System Reconnaissance and Fire Control Vehicle (RFCV)

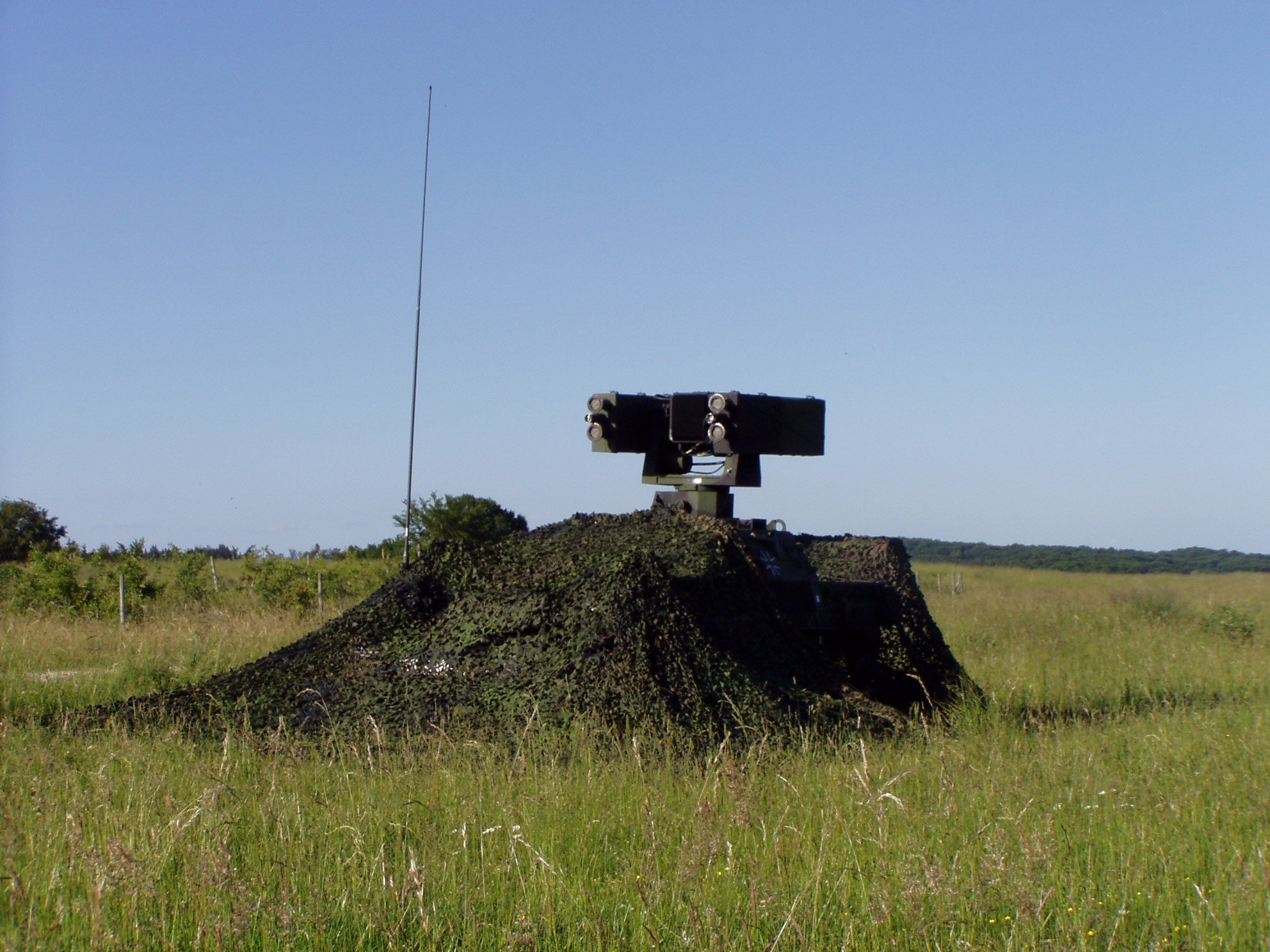
Ozelot air defence weapon carrier with camouflage in firing position

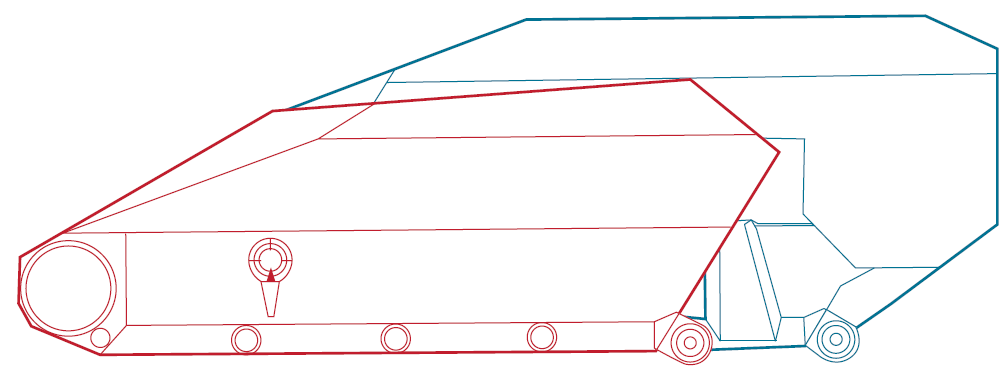
The silhouette of the Wiesel 1 (red) overlaid on that of the Wiesel 2 (blue)

== Operators ==
- Germany: Ordered 343 Wiesel 1s and 179 Wiesel 2s (148 delivered)

== See also ==
- Alvis Stormer
