= German ship Berlin =

Berlin-class oiler

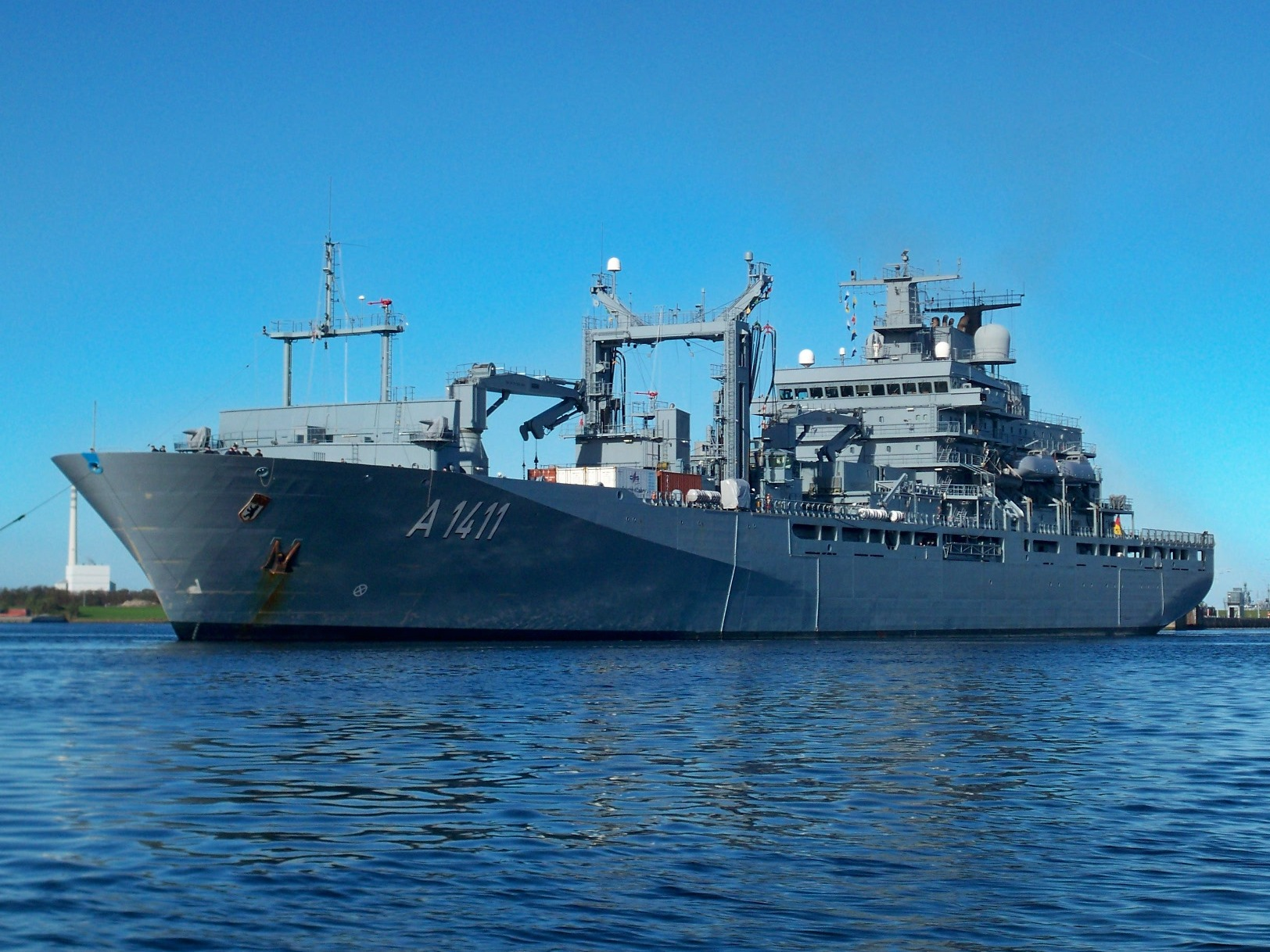
- Berlin approaching Naval Base Wilhelmshaven on 13 October 2011.

History

Germany
- Name: Berlin
- Namesake: Berlin
- Builder: Flensburger Schiffbau-Gesellschaft
- Launched: 30 April 1999
- Commissioned: 11 April 2001
- Home port: Wilhelmshaven, Germany
- Identification: MMSI number: 211211730; Callsign: DRKA; Pennant number: A1411
- Status: Active

General characteristics
- Type: Berlin-class replenishment ship
- Displacement: 20,240 tonnes
- Length: 173.7 m (569 ft 11 in)
- Beam: 24 m (78 ft 9 in)
- Height: 17.5 m (57 ft 5 in)
- Draft: 7.6 m (24 ft 11 in)
- Propulsion: 2 × MAN Diesel 12V 32/40 diesel engines, 5,340 kW (7,160 hp) each; 2 × reduction gears, 2 × controllable pitch four-bladed propellers; 1 × Brunvoll bow thruster; 4 × 1,200 kW (1,600 hp) diesel generators
- Speed: 20 knots (37 km/h; 23 mph)
- Range: 16,000 km (9,900 mi)+
- Endurance: 45 days
- Complement: 139 (+ 94)
- Armament: 4 × MLG 27 mm autocannons; Stinger surface-to-air missile (MANPADS)
- Aircraft carried: 2 × Sea King or NH90 helicopters
- Aviation facilities: Hangar and flight deck

Berlin (A1411) is the lead ship of the Berlin-class replenishment ships of the German Navy. The vessel was constructed by Flensburger Schiffbau-Gesellschaft in Hamburg, Germany and launched on 30 April 1999. Berlin was commissioned on 11 April 2001 and remains in service. The ship is primarily used to replenish stores and supplies of German overseas fleets.

== Development ==
The Berlin-class replenishment ships are the largest vessels of the German Navy. In German, this type of ship is called Einsatzgruppenversorger which can be translated as "task force supplier" though the official translation in English is "combat support ship".

They are intended to support German naval units away from their home ports. The ships carry fuel, provisions, ammunition and other matériel and also provide medical services. The ships are named after German cities where German parliaments were placed.

== Construction and career ==
Berlin was launched on 30 April 1999 in Hamburg, Germany. She was commissioned on 11 April 2001.

In 2016, an overloaded boat sank in the night of between 18 and 19 April, costing the lives of up to 800 migrants. The European Council decision and a parliamentary green light, the German Navy dispatched the frigate Hessen and Berlin to provide a presence north of Libyan territorial waters. Both ships were operating off the Horn of Africa to provide the German Navy with an operational reserve. Hessen and Berlin joined many other European Union vessels, which ranged from warships to auxiliary and coast guard ships to form EU NAVFOR MEDL.

The Spanish frigate Cristóbal Colón conducted a boarding exercise aboard Berlin during Baltic Operations (BALTOPS) 2019.

On 2 April 2020, Berlin set off to the Aegean Sea from Wilhelmshaven with Mecklenburg-Vorpommern to join Standing NATO Maritime Group 2 (SNMG 2).

== Gallery ==
Berlin gallery

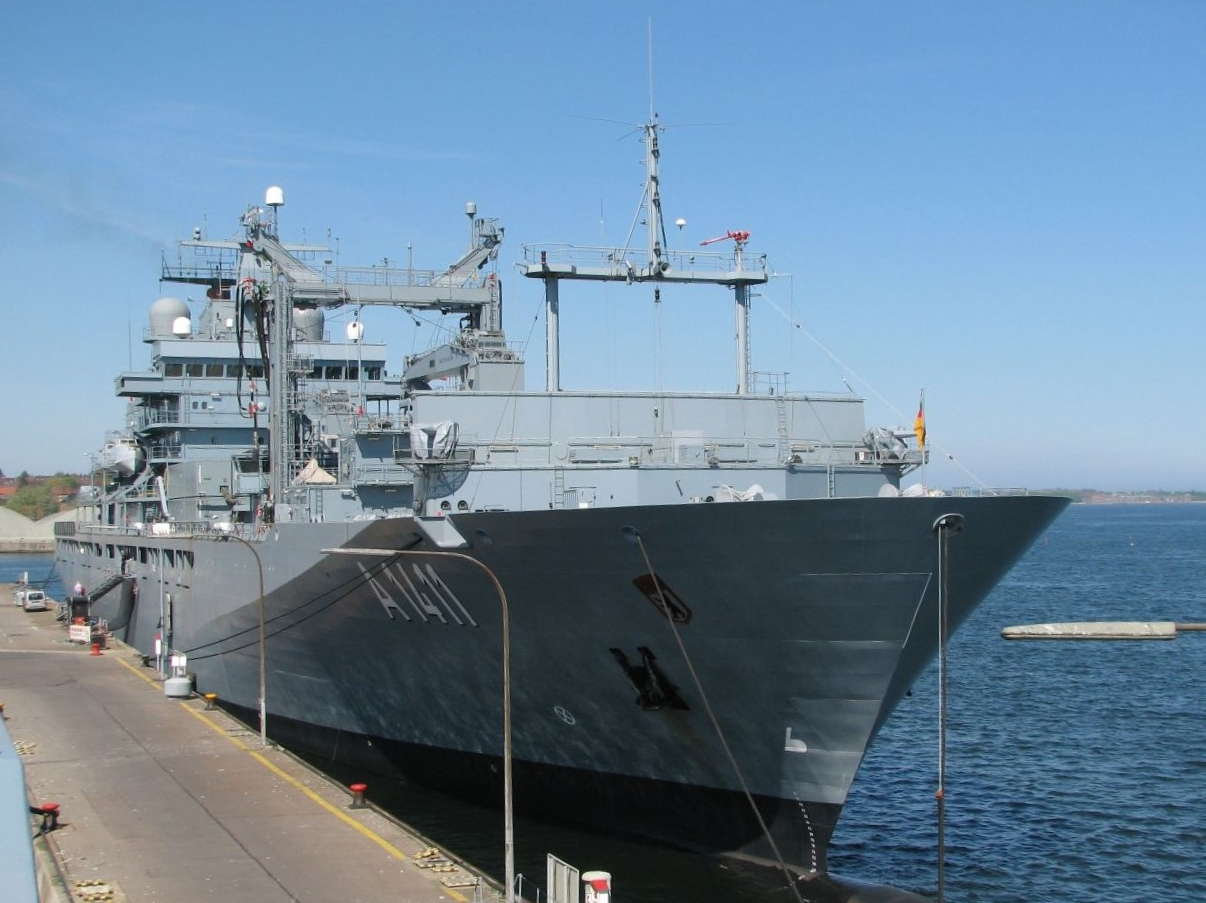
Berlin at a Wilhelmshaven in 2007.

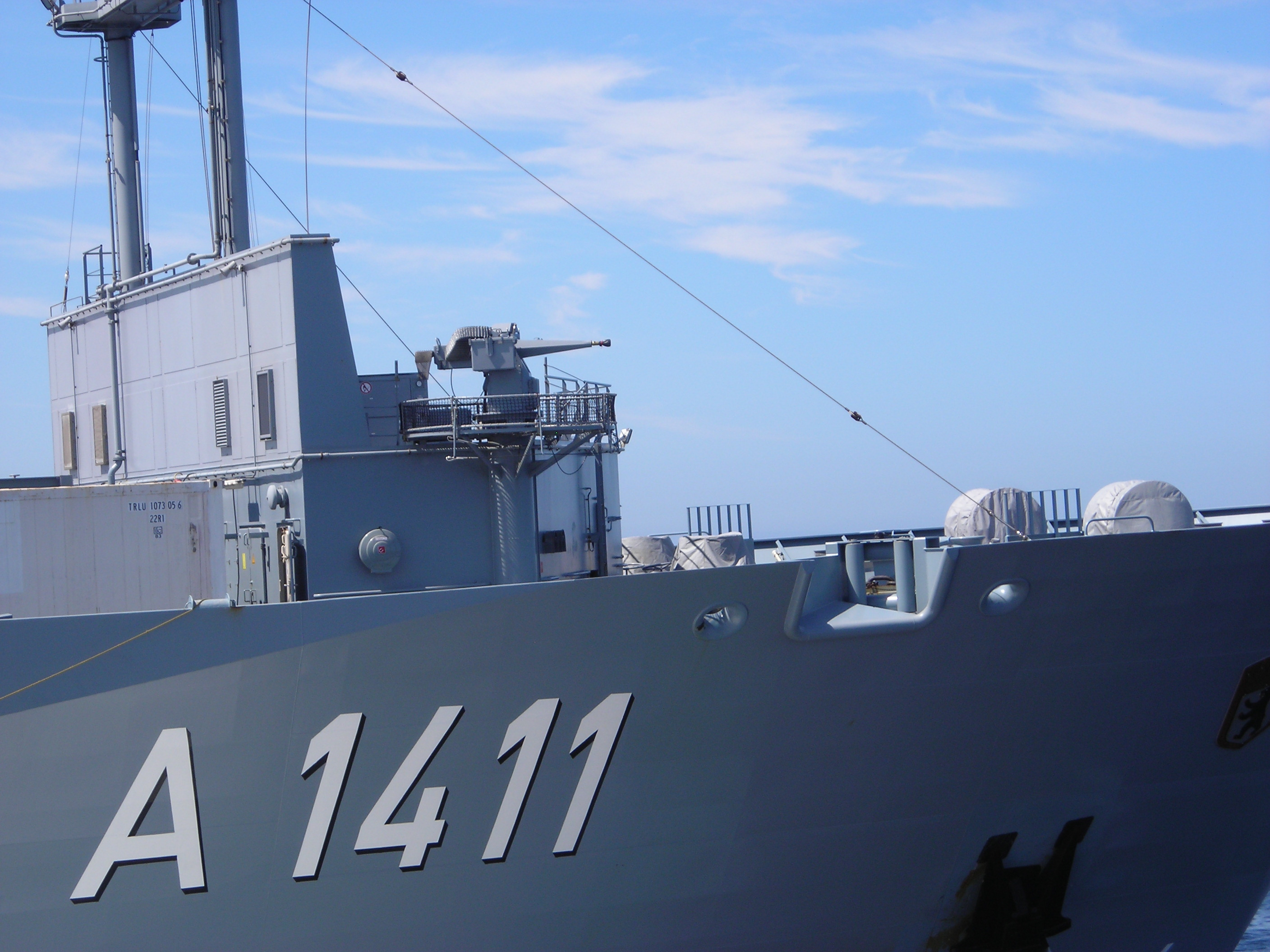
MLG-27 aboard Berlin on 3 March 2008.
