= Berlin-class replenishment ship =

German class of replenishment ships

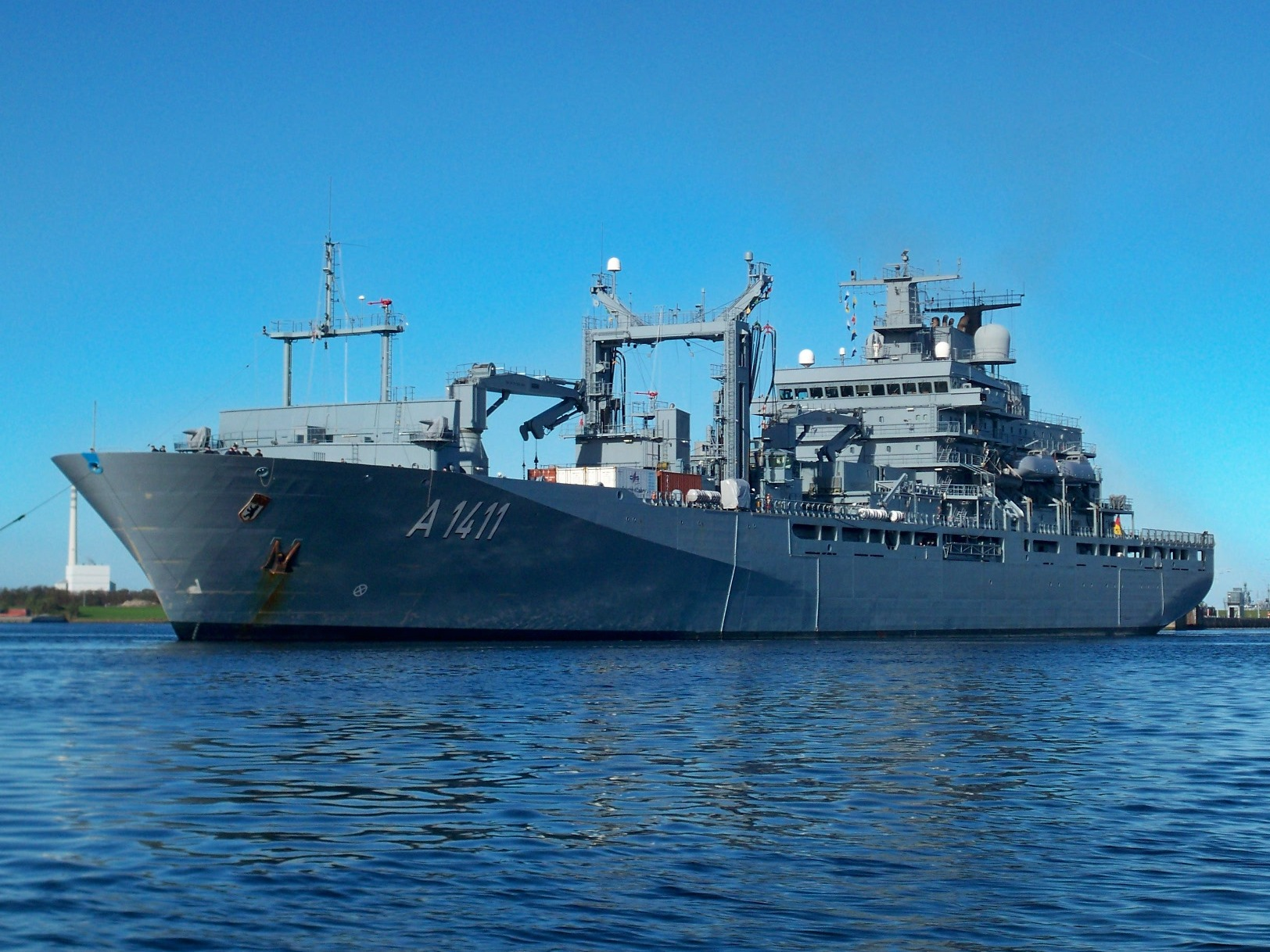
- Berlin

Class overview
- Builders: Flensburger Schiffbau-Gesellschaft; Peene-Werft; Seaspan Marine Corporation
- Operators: German Navy; Royal Canadian Navy (future)
- Preceded by: Protecteur class (Canada); Elbe class (Germany)
- In commission: 2001–present
- Planned: 6
- Building: 2 (RCN)
- Canceled: 1
- Active: 3

General characteristics
- Type: Replenishment oiler
- Displacement: 20,240 t (19,920 long tons)
- Length: 173.7 m (569 ft 11 in)
- Beam: 24 m (78 ft 9 in)
- Draught: 7.4 m (24 ft 3 in)
- Propulsion: 2 × MAN Diesel 12V 32/40 diesel-engines, 10,555 kilowatts (14,154 bhp); 2 × reduction gears, 2 × controllable pitch five-bladed propellers; 1 × bow thruster; 4 × diesel generators
- Speed: 20 knots (37 km/h; 23 mph)
- Endurance: 45 days
- Armament: 4 × MLG 27 mm autocannons; Stinger surface-to-air missile (MANPADS)
- Aircraft carried: 2 × Sea King or NH90 helicopters
- Aviation facilities: Hangar and flight deck

The Type 702 Berlin-class replenishment ship is a series of replenishment ships, originally designed and built for service in the German Navy (Deutsche Marine). Designed to support United Nations overseas missions, the Berlin class were initially to number four vessels. However, a hull was cut from the initial order. The lead ship, Berlin, began construction in 1999 and entered service in 2001. The second hull, Frankfurt am Main, was re-ordered in 1998, began construction in 2000 and entered service in 2002. The third hull, Bonn, was ordered in 2008 to a modified design, began construction in 2010 and entered service in 2013. All three ships are in service and are based at Wilhelmshaven.

The Berlin-class design was selected as the basis for the Royal Canadian Navy's (RCN) replacement for the two former Protecteur-class auxiliary oiler replenishment (AOR) vessels which were retired in 2014. Two Berlin-class variants, described as Joint Support Ships, were ordered by the RCN to be built in Canada. As of 2023, both vessels are under construction.

== General characteristics ==
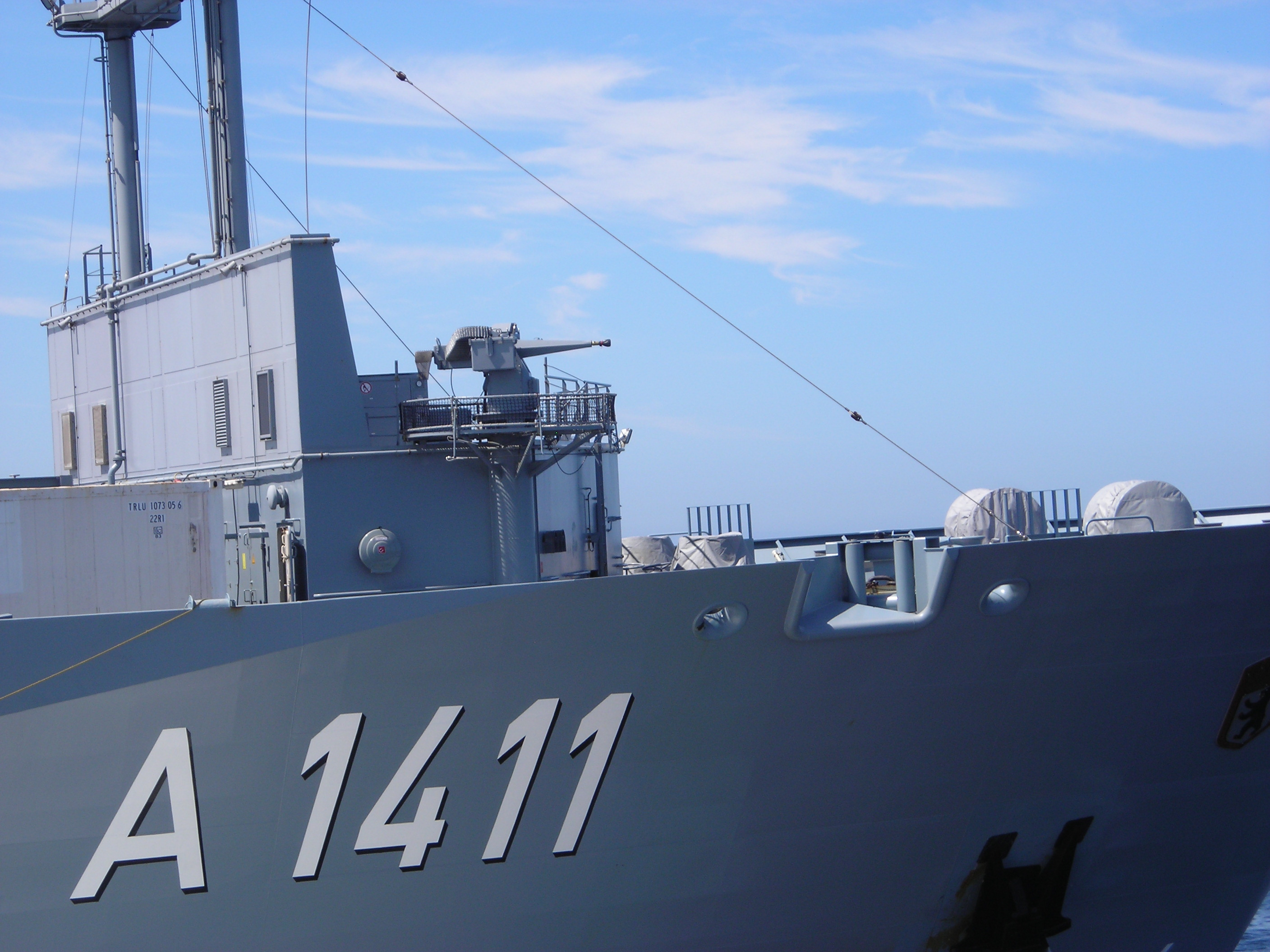
MLG 27 on board Berlin

The Berlin-class replenishment ships are the largest vessels of the German Navy. The Berlin-class replenishment ships are 173.7 metres (569 ft 11 in) long overall and 162 m (531 ft 6 in) between perpendiculars with a beam of 24 m (78 ft 9 in) and a draught of 7.4 m (24 ft 3 in). The vessels have a displacement of 10,115 tonnes (9,955 long tons) light and 20,243 t (19,923 long tons) at full load and measure 18,640 gross tonnage (GT). Constructed with a double hull, they have a pronounced bow bulb. The ships have capacity for 9,000 m^{3} (320,000 cu ft) or 7,600 t (7,500 long tons; 8,400 short tons) of marine diesel fuel, 600 m^{3} (21,000 cu ft) or 490 t (480 long tons; 540 short tons) of aviation fuel, 60 m^{3} (2,100 cu ft) or 126 t (124 long tons; 139 short tons) of lube oil, 100 t (98 long tons; 110 short tons) of spare parts, 230 t (230 long tons; 250 short tons) of provisions and 195 t (192 long tons; 215 short tons) of ammunition, or 71 t (70 long tons; 78 short tons) of fresh water, 100 t (98 long tons; 110 short tons) consumables, 1,075 t (1,058 long tons; 1,185 short tons) of supplies and 230 t of provisions. The vessels have two replenishment at sea stations, one to each per side of the ship and two electro-hydraulic container and cargo cranes. The Berlin class have capacity for 86 TEUs of shipping containers and can stack 26 TEUs in two layers on the upper deck. The ships have provision for a Marineeinsatzrettungzentrum (MERZ) unit which is a modular operations rescue centre aboard the ship. The MERZ is capable of holding 50 patients and providing them with emergency surgery, intensive care, internal medicine and dental services.

The first two vessels of the class, Berlin and Frankfurt am Main are powered by two MAN Diesel 12V 32/40 diesel engines, creating 10,555 kilowatts (14,154 bhp) with two reduction gears turning two controllable pitch five-bladed propellers and powering one bow thruster. Bonn creates 14,400 kW (19,300 hp). They have four Deutz-MWM diesel generators. The three ships have a maximum speed of 20 knots (37 km/h; 23 mph) and have an endurance of 45 days. The Berlin-class ships have a helipad aft and a hangar and can support two helicopters, either the Sea King or NH90 models which can be used for vertical replenishment. The vessels are equipped with radar and mine avoidance sonar and one of the radars is situated aft for use during helicopter takeoff and landing.

The Berlin class are armed with four MLG 27 mm (1.1 in) autocannon for anti-aircraft defence and four 12.7 mm (0.50 in) machine guns. The MLG 27 replaced older Bofors 40 mm (1.6 in)/70 guns. The vessels are also fitted for but not with Stinger surface-to-air missile (MANPADS) for point defence. The vessels have a complement of 159 plus 74 embarked. (Note: The number of crew varies between sources, ranging from 139 plus 94 embarked to 233.)

== List of ships ==
Berlin class construction data
Image	Pennant number	Name	Laid down	Launched	Commissioned	Homeport	Status
	A1411	Berlin	4 January 1999	30 April 1999	11 April 2001	Wilhelmshaven	In active service
	A1412	Frankfurt am Main	28 August 2000	5 January 2001	27 May 2002	Wilhelmshaven	In active service
	A1413	Bonn	16 September 2010	27 April 2011	13 September 2013	Wilhelmshaven	In active service

== Construction and career ==
In 1994, the German Navy sought to construct four replenishment vessels, built in two batches. The ships were designed to support United Nations operations overseas. However, the project was trimmed to one and the design was finalised in mid-1996. The first hull was ordered in October 1996. A second hull was authorized in June 1998. The hulls of the ships were built by Flensburger Schiffbau-Gesellschaft at their shipyard in Flensburg, Germany, with the electronic systems installed by Lürssen and the superstructure, final outfitting and sea trials done by Krögerwerft. The first ship, Berlin, completed construction in 2001 and was commissioned into the German Navy on 11 April 2001. The second vessel, Frankfurt am Main followed in 2002 and was commissioned on 27 May 2002. The third ship, Bonn, was ordered on 3 December 2008 with increased power and accommodations and was built at Peenewerft in Wolgast. On 13 September 2013, Bonn was commissioned into service at Wilhelmshaven.

In 2007, Frankfurt am Main performed trials with Finnish 14 m (46 ft) Jurmo-class landing craft. In 2020, Berlin operated with Standing NATO Maritime Group 2 (SNMG 2).

== Export ==
=== Royal Canadian Navy ===
Two ships will be procured to replace the two Protecteur-class vessels operated by the RCN until 2014 under the Joint Support Ship Project. The ships will be built by Seaspan Marine Corporation at the Vancouver Shipyards facility located in North Vancouver, British Columbia. The design was chosen over a design by BMT Technology. At the time, the option for a third was still possible. Canadian sailors previewed Bonn in order to make themselves familiar with the design.

The ships were originally to be named Queenston and Chateauguay, for battles from the War of 1812. This decision was reversed in September 2017, when it was announced that the ships would perpetuate the names Protecteur and Preserver. As of 2015 it was estimated that the two Canadian ships would cost C$2.6bn (~€1.75bn) to build, and a further C$4.5bn (~€3bn) to operate over 25 years. The keel of the first ship was laid down on 16 January 2020.
