= German ship Bonn =

Berlin-class oiler

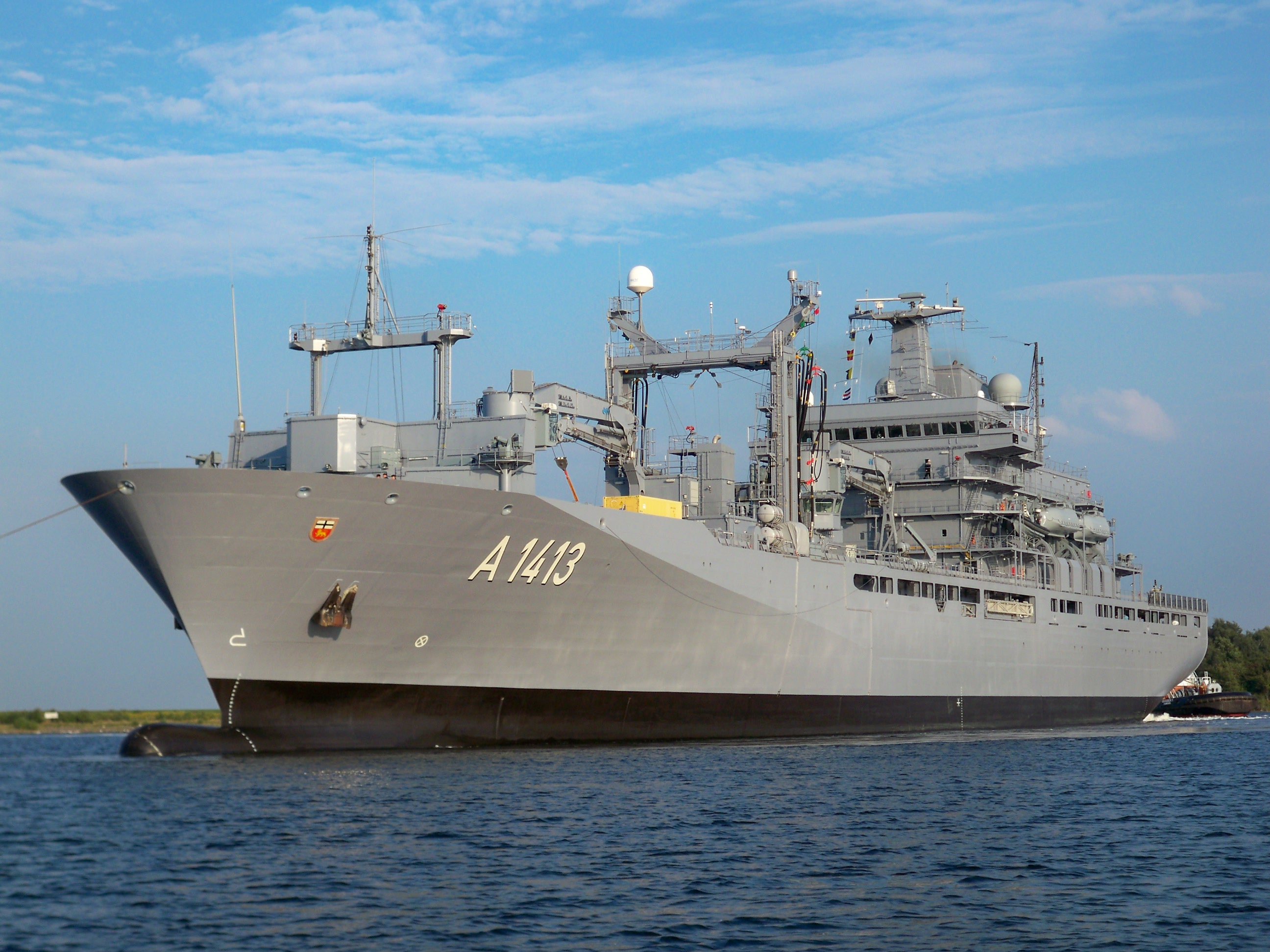
- Bonn returning from her sea trials on 29 August 2013.

History

Germany
- Name: Bonn
- Namesake: Bonn
- Builder: Peene-Werft
- Laid down: 16 September 2010
- Launched: 27 April 2011
- Commissioned: 13 September 2013
- Home port: Wilhelmshaven, Germany
- Identification: MMSI number: 211927000; Callsign: DRKC; Pennant number: A1413
- Status: Active

General characteristics
- Type: Berlin-class replenishment ship
- Displacement: 20,240 tonnes
- Length: 173.7 m (569 ft 11 in)
- Beam: 24 m (78 ft 9 in)
- Height: 17.5 m (57 ft 5 in)
- Draft: 7.6 m (24 ft 11 in)
- Propulsion: 2 × MAN Diesel 12V 32/40 diesel-engines, 5,340 kW (7,160 hp) each; 2 × reduction gears, 2 × controllable pitch four-bladed propellers; 1 × bow thruster; 4 × 1200 kW diesel generators
- Speed: 20 knots (37 km/h; 23 mph)
- Range: 16,000 km (8,600 nmi; 9,900 mi)
- Endurance: 45 days
- Complement: 139 (+ 94)
- Armament: 4 × MLG 27 mm autocannons; Stinger surface-to-air missile (MANPADS)
- Aircraft carried: 2 × Sea King or NH90 helicopters
- Aviation facilities: Hangar and flight deck

Bonn (A1413) is the third ship of the Berlin-class replenishment ships of the German Navy.

== Development ==
The Berlin-class replenishment ships are the largest vessels of the German Navy. In German, this type of ship is called Einsatzgruppenversorger which can be translated as "task force supplier" though the official translation in English is "combat support ship".

They are intended to support German naval units away from their home ports. The ships carry fuel, provisions, ammunition and other matériel and also provide medical services. The ships are named after German cities where German parliaments were placed.

== Construction and career ==
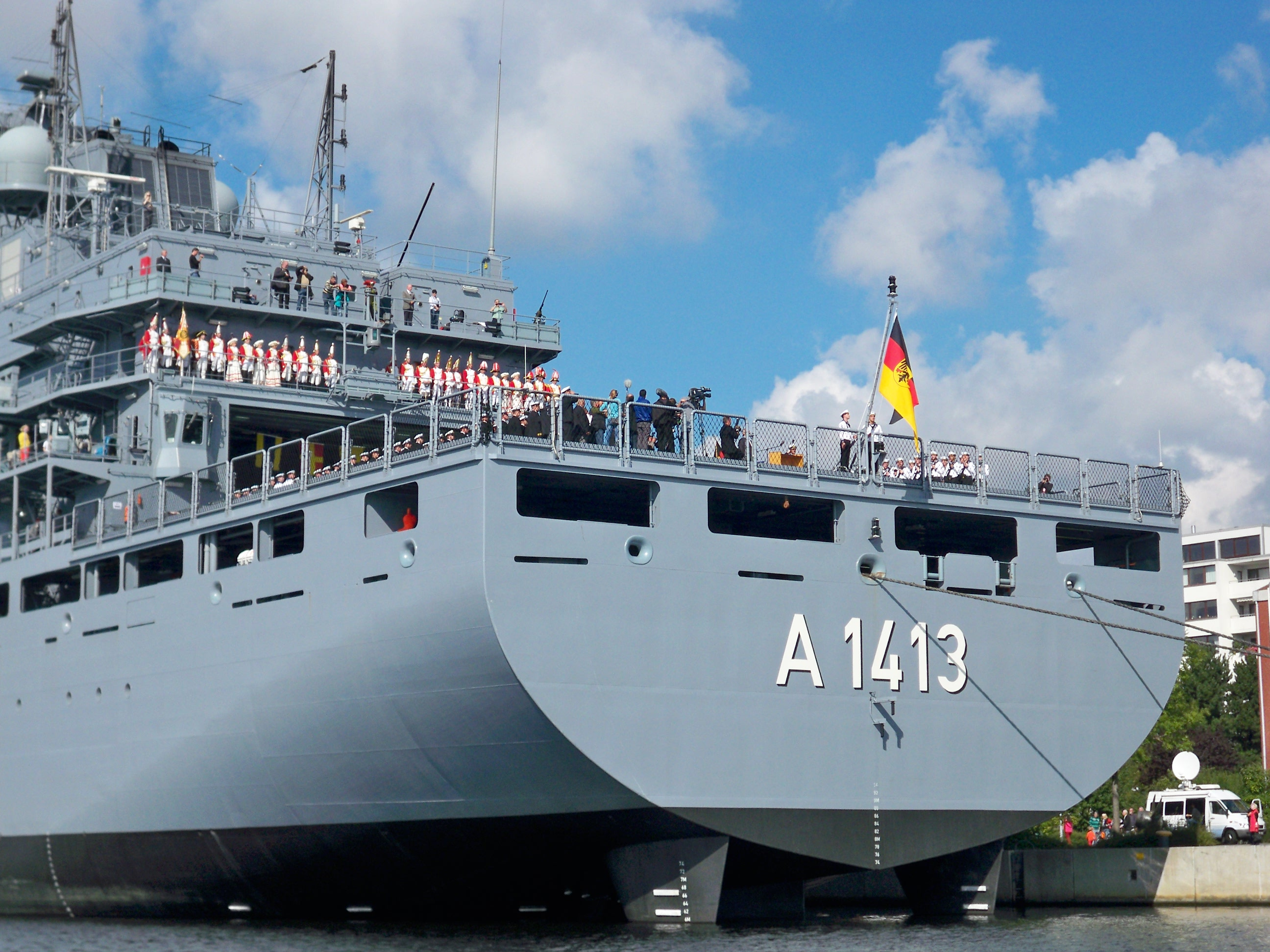
Bonn's aft on 13 September 2013.

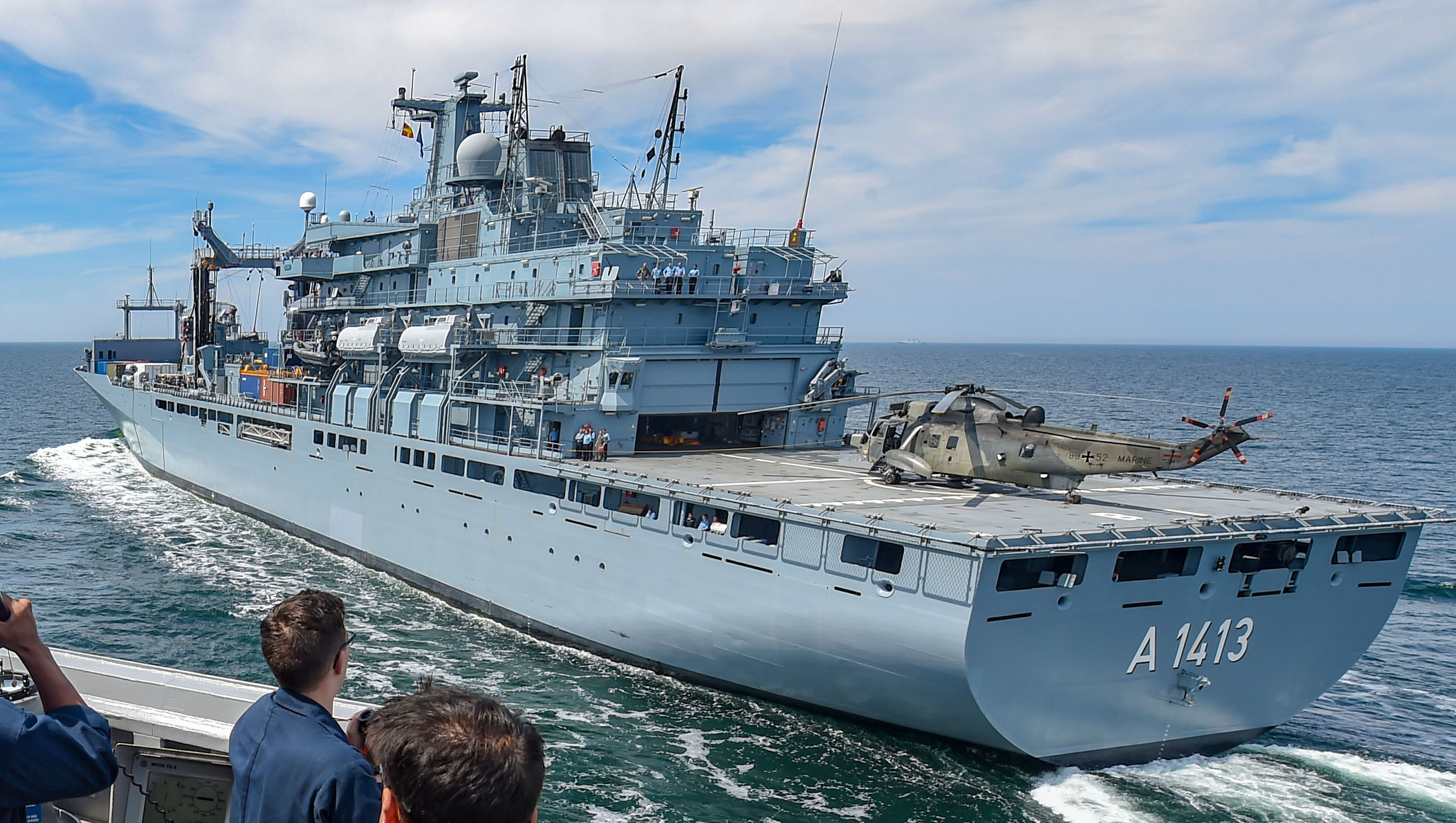
Bonn alongside USS Gravely during BALTOP 2019.

Bonn was laid down on 16 September 2010 and launched on 27 April 2011 at Hamburg, Germany. She was commissioned on 30 September 2013.

Bonn participated in BALTOPS 2019 and she came alongside to replenish USS Gravely during the exercise.

During her deployment with Operation Irini and following the outbreak of the Sudanese civil war, Bonn was briefly reassigned to the German evacuation effort Operation Raus aus Khartoum on 21 April 2023, where an additional sea-based rescue effort was planned from Port Sudan. However, after the successful air operation, she was not required and resumed her prior assignment until she returned to port on 6 July 2023.
