= SYRANO =

Battlefield robot of the French military

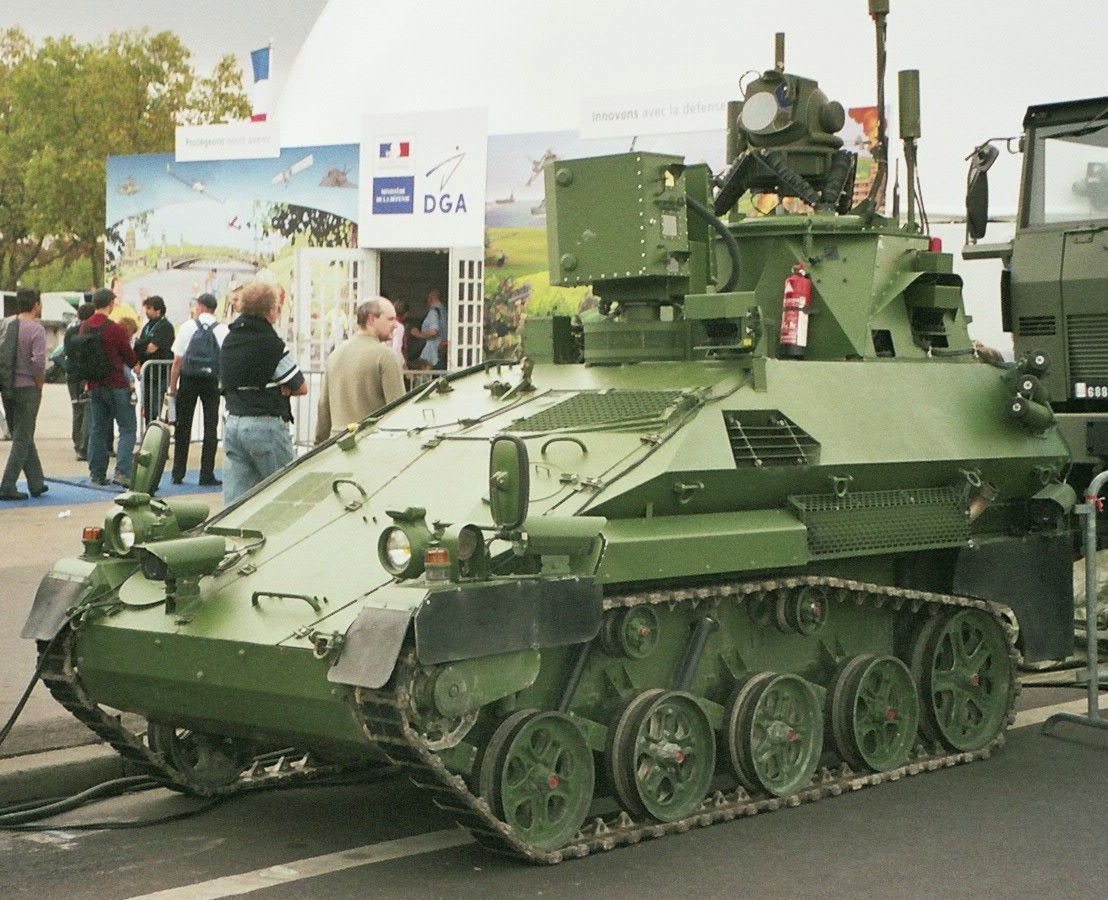

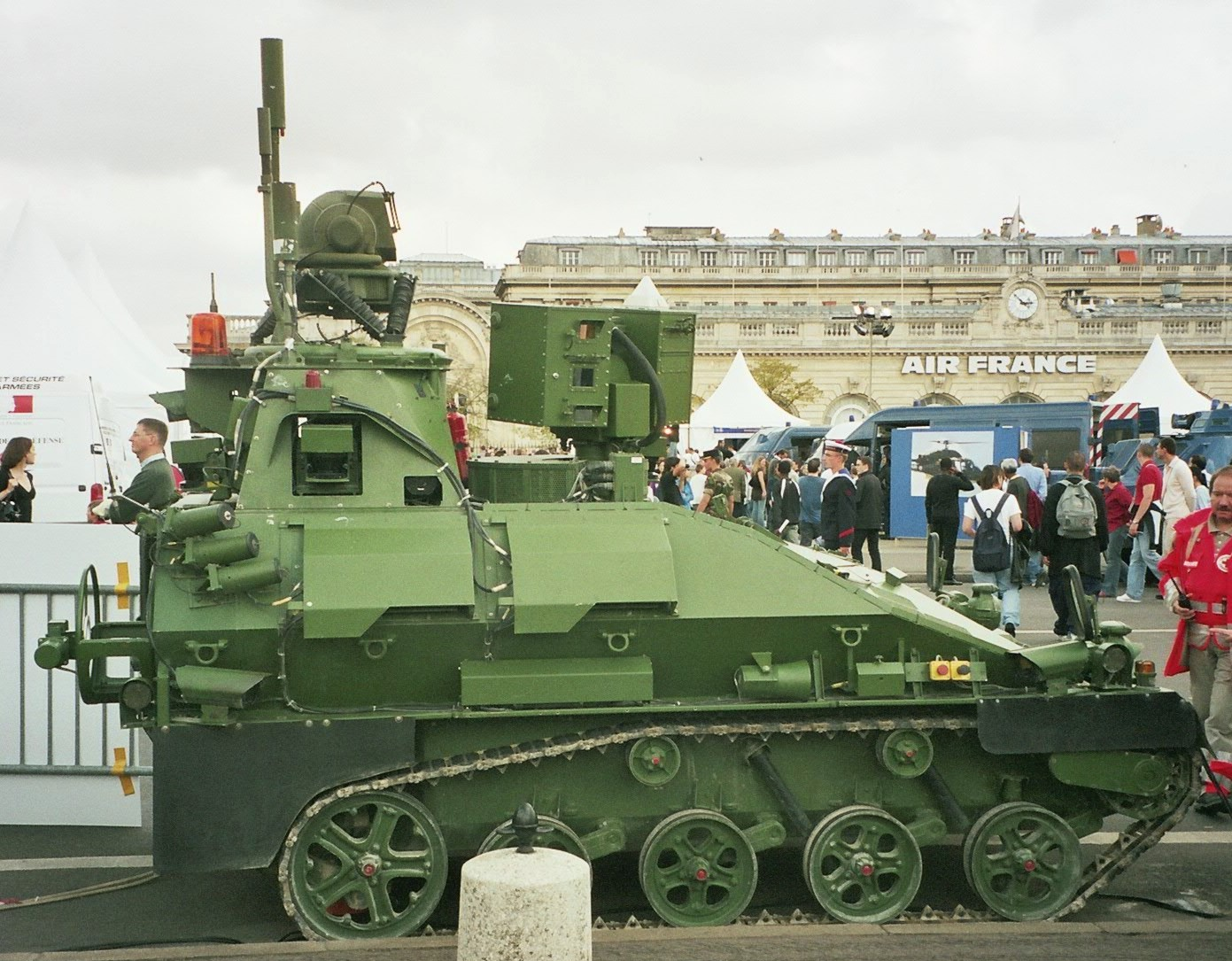

SYRANO (Système Robotisé d'Acquisition pour la Neutralisation d'Objectifs, "Robotic acquisition system for neutralization of targets") is the first operational battlefield robot of the French military.

SYRANO was designed by a consortium of CGEY, THALES, GIAT Industries and SAGEM to collect information in combat zones, especially, in urban combat conditions. It is based on the Wiesel AWC of the German Army.

SYRANO was developed for the collection of information, particularly from urban battlefields, such as on enemy units hidden from friendly forces. By 2005 it could be operated from a distance of 2 kilometres (1.2 mi), with ambitions to increase this to 10 kilometres (6.2 mi).
