= Operation Raus aus Khartum =

Evacuation operation during the 2023 Sudan war

- Part of the Battle of Khartoum and the 2023 Sudan conflict
- Operational scope: Humanitarian relief
- Type: Emergency evacuation
- Location: Sudan (mainly Khartoum and Port Sudan)
- Planned by: Bundeswehr, German Ministry of Defence and German Foreign Office
- Objective: Evacuation of German and other foreign nationals from Sudan
- Date: 23 April 2023 – 25 April 2023
- Executed by: Bundeswehr
- Outcome: 740 foreign nationals evacuated

Operation Raus aus Khartum (German: Operation [Get] Out of Khartoum) was an evacuation operation of German and other armed forces during the 2023 Sudan conflict. The operation lasted from April 23 to April 25, 2023. A total of 8 flights evacuated 740 people, including 200 Germans. The Bundeswehr flew out people from around 30 nations, including 90 Canadians and 40 Dutchmen as well as around 30 Jordanians. The operation went without incident. The Sudanese authorities had been informed in advance through diplomatic channels.

== History ==
After the fighting between the hostile groups surrounding the Sudanese army chief and head of state, General Abdel Fattah al-Burhan, and his deputy, General Mohamed Hamdan Dagalo, further plunged Sudan into chaos, various states organized the evacuation of their citizens from the country. The Bundeswehr had already deployed several Airbus A400Ms and around 1,000 Bundeswehr soldiers (including Luftlandebrigade 1 and KSK) in the Middle East and North Africa at the Muwaffaq Salti Air Base. From April 23, 2023, the Bundeswehr took over the management of the multinational flight coordination and people were flown out to Jordan from Wadi Sayyidna Airport in Sudan. The German ship Bonn was ordered to take in foreign citizens in addition to the air evacuations to Port Sudan on the Red Sea. The members of the Bundestag have on Wednesday, 26 April 2023, subsequently approved the evacuation operation of the Bundeswehr in Sudan.

== People flown out ==
A total of 740 people from 30 nations were flown out by the Bundeswehr:

Country	People
Germany	200
Canada	90
Netherlands	40
Jordan	30
unknown	380
